= Alvord cutthroat trout =

Conservation status
- Presumed Extinct (NatureServe)

Scientific classification
- Kingdom: Animalia
- Phylum: Chordata
- Class: Actinopterygii
- Order: Salmoniformes
- Family: Salmonidae
- Genus: Oncorhynchus
- Species: O. henshawi
- Subspecies: O. h. alvordensis

Trinomial name
- Oncorhynchus henshawi alvordensis (Gill & Jordan, 1878; Page et al., 2023; Trotter et al., 2018)

Subspecies of fish

The Alvord Cutthroat Trout, Oncorhynchus henshawi alvordensis, (formerly O. clarkii. alvordensis) was a subspecies of cutthroat trout. It was known only from Trout Creek in Oregon and Virgin Creek in Nevada, although it may have lived in several of the larger Alvord Basin streams during recent times. It was native to spring-fed creeks that ran down to Alvord Dry Lake in southeast Oregon, which was a large lake during the ice ages and an isolated drainage, part of the Great Basin today. This is one of the two cutthroat trout taxa considered extinct because all known populations are hybridized with rainbow trout which were introduced into streams in the Alvord basin in the 1920s, resulting in cutbows.

The subspecies name was given in 2002 by Robert Behnke (Trout and Salmon of North America); However, In 2023 the American Fisheries Society Common and Scientific Names of Fishes from the United States, Canada, and Mexico, 8th edition reclassified all Cutthroat Trout from one species (formerly, Oncorhynchus clarkii) into four distinct species: Coastal, Lahontan, Westslope, and Rocky Mountain Cutthroat Trout. The Alvord Cutthroat retained their trinomial designation as a subspecies (alvordensis), but as a subspecies of the Lahontan Cutthroat Trout (Oncorhynchus henshawi).

In the fall 2005 issue of Trout (Trout Unlimited's Journal of Coldwater Fisheries Conservation), in an article titled About Trout: Ivory-billed trout, Dr. Behnke notes a historical reference that the now "extinct" Alvord Cutthroat Trout had been transplanted into another basin adjacent to the Alvord Basin, and that this transplant occurred prior to the 1928 introduction of rainbows into Trout Creek. Dr. Behnke reflects on which stream these trout may have been introduced into.

In the winter 2007 issue of Trout, in an article titled Toward Definitiveness, Dr. Behnke relates a summer 2006 electrofishing (sampling) project with the Oregon Department of Fish and Wildlife (ODFW). He realized that the stream he'd referenced in 2005 was above the maximum Pleistocene lake level of any downstream flow-connected basins, and thus he doubts that redband trout ever made it to this elevated location.

In the late 1950s and through the 1960s the ODFW had introduced Lahontan cutthroat trout and rainbow trout into this stream, so Dr. Behnke expected to find a hybrid swarm during this sampling project. Yet, during this trip he was pleased to find that all of the trout examined seemed to be of the Lahontan strain; with some trout exhibiting the appearance (phenotype) of the "extinct" Alvord cutthroat trout. In a 2007 publication of the Oregon Chapter of the American Fisheries Society, entitled Redband Trout Resilience and Challenge in a Changing Landscape, Dr. Behnke comments that he believes there is a strong possibility that trout caught in this stream circa World War II (confirmed by local historian Mr. Bruce Gilinski, who had direct experience on the stream just after World War II) were derived from the early transplant of the now extinct Alvord cutthroat. He thus surmises that what remains of the Alvord subspecies is incorporated into the trout now found in this small stream adjacent to the Alvord Basin.

Dr. Behnke has urged the State of Oregon to create a population of trout phenotypically representative of the "extinct" alvordensis by transplanting specimens that most closely resemble alvordensis into presently fishless waters, where they can self-propagate and preserve the phenotype (if not genotype) of the Alvord cutthroat trout.

In April 2013, Shannon Hurn, ODFW Fisheries Biologist, Hines District (SE Oregon) has released a 2013 Management Proposal; which includes the plan to take spawning pairs of cutthroat trout that exhibit the phenotype of the extinct Alvord cutthroat trout, to relocate these pairs to the Klamath Hatchery in Oregon, and to propagate fry (offspring) from these pairs, to rear the trout at Klamath Hatchery, to look for uniformity among the sub-adult trout and to document the phenotype stages, and to ultimately transfer trout with the Alvord (alvordensis) phenotype to a suitable fishless host stream in SE Oregon (preferably in the Alvord Basin - the native realm of the extinct Alvord cutthroat trout).

Unfortunately, the plan for the project was not followed. Instead, based on visual inspection at the parr stage it was assumed by ODFW staff that the trout appeared to be cutthroat x rainbow trout hybrids (prior to the genetic results being completed) and the hatchery program was abandoned. This move proved premature and ill-timed, as once the results genetic study were available, it indicated that only ~3% of the genetics were from rainbow trout (Pritchard et al. 2015) Additionally, during the same period as that the hatchery program was initiated Southeastern Oregon was hit by several years of extreme drought. This resulted in an increase in fires along the stream and complete drying of some of the stream reaches. While the hatchery fish could have been returned to the stream to at least help buffer the drought conditions instead hatchery fish were released into Willow Valley Reservoir a body of water that is known for its warm water fisheries and is unlikely suitable for trout.
