= Humboldt cutthroat trout =

Scientific classification
- Kingdom: Animalia
- Phylum: Chordata
- Class: Actinopterygii
- Division: Teleostei
- Order: Salmoniformes
- Family: Salmonidae
- Genus: Oncorhynchus
- Species: O. henshawi
- Subspecies: O. h. humboldtensis

Trinomial name
- Oncorhynchus henshawi humboldtensis Trotter and Behnke, 2008

Subspecies of fish

The Humboldt cutthroat trout, Oncorhynchus henshawi humboldtensis, (formerly, Oncorhynchus clarkii humboldtensis) is a subspecies of Lahontan cutthroat trout, a North American fish in the family Salmonidae. It is one of the several subspecies of cutthroat trout. It was formally scientifically named in 2008 by Trotter and Behnke, who stated its distribution is in the basins of the upper Humboldt River of northern Nevada, the Upper Quinn River (Nevada and Oregon), as well as the Whitehorse (Coyote) basin (Oregon). The Nevada and Oregon Fish and Wildlife authorities still consider these populations belonging to the subspecies O. c. henshawi (the Lahontan cutthroat trout).

In 2023 the American Fisheries Society Common and Scientific Names of Fishes from the United States, Canada, and Mexico, 8th edition reclassified all Cutthroat Trout from one species (formerly, Oncorhynchus clarkii) into four distinct species: Coastal, Lahontan, Westslope, and Rocky Mountain Cutthroat Trout. The Humboldt cutthroat trout retained their trinomial designation as a subspecies (humboldtensis), but as a subspecies of the Lahontan Cutthroat Trout (Oncorhynchus henshawi).
