= Lahontan cutthroat trout =

Conservation status
- Vulnerable (NatureServe)

Scientific classification
- Kingdom: Animalia
- Phylum: Chordata
- Class: Actinopterygii
- Division: Teleostei
- Order: Salmoniformes
- Family: Salmonidae
- Genus: Oncorhynchus
- Species: O. henshawi

Binomial name
- Oncorhynchus henshawi (Gill & Jordan, 1878)
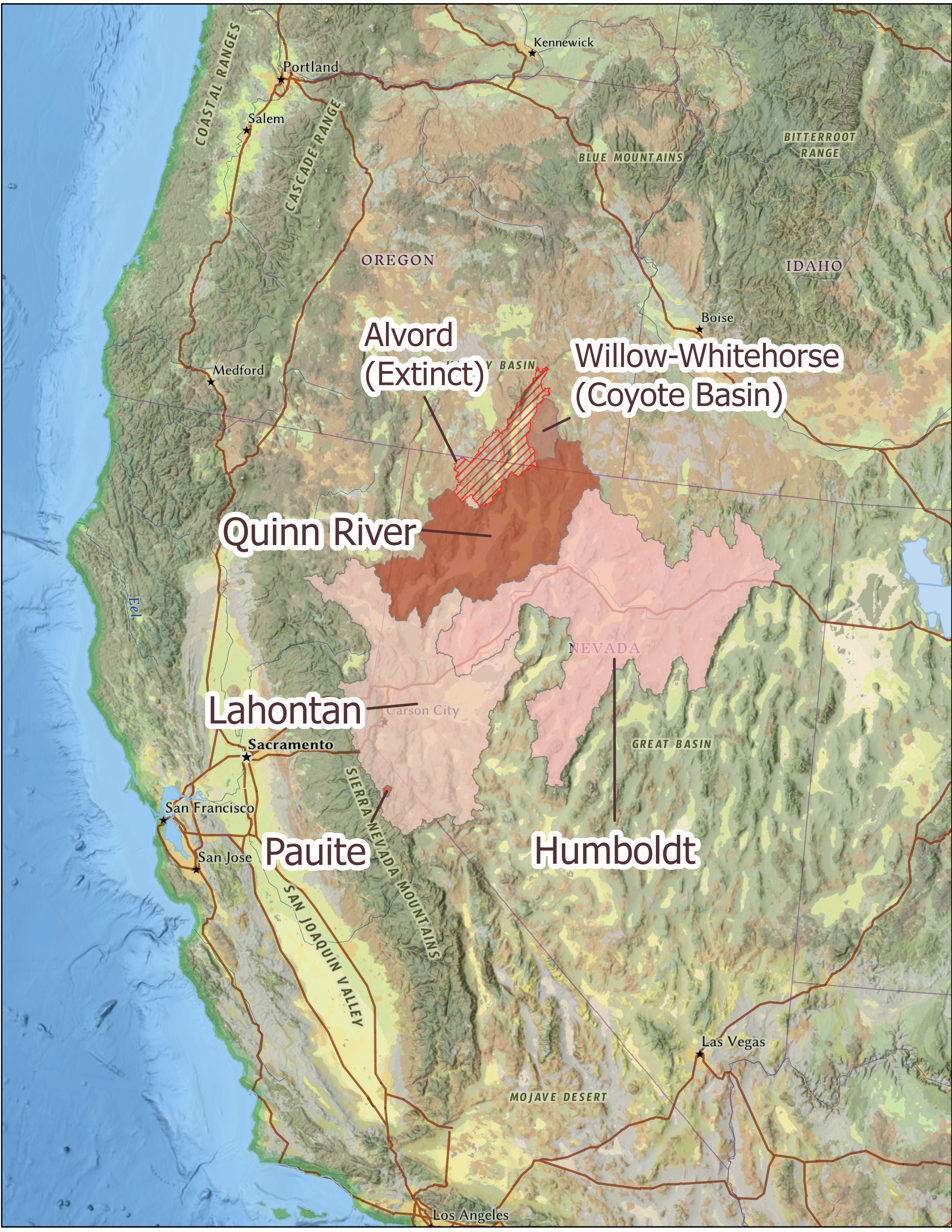

Subspecies of fish

Lahontan cutthroat trout, (Oncorhynchus henshawi), (formerly, O. clarkii henshawi) formerly all grouped together as the cutthroat trout under a single species Oncorhynchus clarkii with many subspecies, is a fish species of the family Salmonidae native to cold-water tributaries of the Basin and Range province of Nevada, as well as adjoining areas of southeast Oregon and northeastern California. As a member of the genus Oncorhynchus, it is a part of the Pacific trout group, which includes the widely distributed rainbow trout. Cutthroat trout are popular gamefish, especially among fly fishing anglers. The common name "cutthroat" refers to the distinctive red slash on the underside of the lower jaw. This species includes the type subspecies, the giant Lahontan cutthroat trout found in Pyramid Lake.

== Taxonomy ==
Historically, cutthroat trout were considered a single species (Oncorhynchus clarkii). However, a review of genetic, taxonomic, and geologic evidence lead biologists to the conclusion that cutthroat trout should be divided into four species, with each (except for the coastal cutthroat) having multiple unique populations corresponding to the evolutionary lineages found within major river basins. In 2023, the American Fisheries Society formally reclassified all cutthroat trout into the following four distinct species: Coastal, Lahontan, Westslope, and Rocky Mountain cutthroat trout.

=== Subspecies and uniquely identifiable evolutionary units ===
During the 2015 meeting of the American Fisheries Society (AFS), the Western Division of AFS (WDAFS) organized a special workshop with a panel of experts to evaluate the validity of the currently recognized subspecies, considering the available evidence both supporting and challenging the existing classification system. The panel found the long-held classification scientifically unsupportable, and proposed a revised classification and phylogenic tree that aligns with the preponderance of genetic, geologic, and fossil evidence.

To break the deadlock, the panel introduced the term "uniquely identifiable evolutionary unit" (UIEU) to describe subunits that have diverged from a species. These UIEUs represent distinct population groups that exhibit evolutionary independence but do not fully meet the criteria for classification as separate species. By adopting this terminology, the panel was able to recognize and discuss these units without becoming entangled in the debate over subspecies.

=== Origin ===
Cutthroat trout have a long history in the Lahontan Basin, supported by fossil records dating back at least 10 million years. Fossil evidence from the Nevadaplano suggests cutthroat trout originated in high-elevation areas more than 10 million years ago, predating the origins of Rainbow and Redband trout. Oncorhynchus cyniclope, a fossil trout from Nevada dated to around 9 million years ago, is described as an early member of the cutthroat trout clade with jawbones resembling modern O. h. henshawi. Fossil evidence, including O. cyniclope and Pliocene fossils, suggests that descendants of O. belli (another fossil form) persisted in western Nevada and are ancestral to the Lahontan cutthroat trout. The closure of the Lahontan Basin around 4 million years ago may have severed connections with Coastal cutthroat trout and initiated independent evolution. Molecular clock estimates place the divergence of the Lahontan lineage from the Snake River lineage at approximately 2 million years, and from the upper Columbia River lineage at about 2.8 million years.

=== Evolutionary lineages ===
Based on the sources, the Lahontan Basin evolutionary lineage is a distinct species of cutthroat trout. The diversification patterns and timing within the Lahontan Basin lineage have been significantly shaped by the dynamic hydrographic landscape, particularly the history of pluvial Lake Lahontan.

==== Relationship to other lineages ====
The Lahontan cutthroat trout group is considered sister to the Westslope cutthroat trout in many analyses. The Lahontan Basin evolutionary lineage is also recognized as the sister lineage to the Coastal cutthroat trout lineage. Some studies using mitochondrial DNA and Y chromosome markers suggest closer associations between the Westslope and Lahontan cutthroat trout lineages, with the Coastal cutthroat trout less closely related. Karyotype data suggests that the Yellowstone complex of cutthroat trout originated from a 64-chromosome ancestor of the Lahontan cutthroat trout lineage.

==== Uniquely identifiable ecological units ====
Common name	Scientific name*	Range	Image
Alvord cutthroat trout	O. henshawii alvordensis† Behnke, 2002	Was endemic to tributaries of Alvord Lake in southeastern Oregon, including populations native to the Virgin-Thousand and Trout Creek drainages. This form is considered extinct, having been lost due to introgression with rainbow trout by the mid-20th century. Its uniqueness as a UIEU is supported by molecular evidence.	
Quinn River cutthroat trout	O. henshawi ssp.	This unit encompasses cutthroat trout from the Quinn River drainage in Nevada and Oregon(Northwestern Basin). Classification of these trout has been historically ambiguous. While gill raker counts suggest a fluvial life history similar to Humboldt (Eastern Basin) trout, mtDNA analyses suggest a common origin with Western Lahontan Basin populations. Genetic evidence indicates they are genetically distinct.	Quinn River cutthroat trout
Humboldt cutthroat trout	O. h. humboldtensis Trotter and Behnke, 2008	Humboldt cutthroat trout from the Humboldt and Reese River drainages (Eastern Basin) have a fluvial life history and lack the lacustrine characteristics of western forms. Based on morphological differences, some researchers proposed these be recognized as a separate subspecies (O. h. humboldtensis), While a separate UIEU is supported, genetic data reveals a complex history with varying relationships to western and northwestern basin populations, influenced by geography and the changing connections of pluvial Lake Lahontan. Considered by the Nevada Division of Wildlife to be a population of O. c. henshawi.	Humboldt cutthroat trout
Lahontan cutthroat trout	O. h. henshawi (Gill and Jordan, 1878)	Native in eastern California and western Nevada, including populations from the Truckee, Walker, and Carson rivers, along with Summit Lake. These areas are defined by large lacustrine habitats, remnants of ancient Lake Lahontan (Western Basin). The large lacustrine forms from lakes like Pyramid, Walker, and Tahoe are part of this group and are distinguished by their size and characteristics adapted to lake life, such as spotting, many gill rakers for filter feeding, and many pyloric caeca for piscivory; it is designated as threatened (1975).	Lahontan cutthroat trout from Pyramid Lake with the tail of a Cui-ui lakesucker or Tui chub sticking out of its mouth
Willow-Whitehorse Basin cutthroat trout	O. h. ssp., considered a separate subspecies by Behnke (2002), but not by Trotter and Behnke (2008).	Native to southeastern Oregon's Coyote Lake basin. Considered a distinct population segment of the Lahontan cutthroat trout by the U.S. Fish and Wildlife Service, and of the Humboldt cutthroat trout by Trotter and Behnke (2008).	Willow-Whitehorse Basin cutthroat trout
Paiute cutthroat trout	O. h. seleniris (J. O. Snyder, 1933)	Found historically in the upper East Carson River drainage in California, representing the most restricted range of any cutthroat trout. They are characterized by a lack of spots but are otherwise similar to western Lahontan Basin LCT in physical counts. Multiple lines of genetic evidence indicate that Paiute cutthroat trout are sister to other members of the Lahontan lineage. Endemic to the eastern Sierra Nevada Mountains; it is designated as threatened (1975).	Paiute cutthroat trout
*as proposed by Love Stowell, et al. 2018.

== Description ==
Lahontan cutthroat trout are known for being distinct and diverse, reflecting a history of long isolation and evolution. Distinguishing characteristics include medium-sized, roundish spots distributed across the body, head, and often the abdomen; the highest number of gill rakers among cutthroat trout (21–28, averaging 23–26); and abundant pyloric caeca (40–75, typically more than 50). Typical vertebral counts are 61–63, and lateral line scales range from 150–180. They are also known for their potential to grow to large sizes, with records of 18.6 kg and reports of 28 kg specimens from Pyramid Lake. Lahontan cutthroat trout and its subspecies share a 64-chromosome karyotype. Genetic evidence, such as diagnostic allozyme loci and SNPs, also characterizes them. Phenotypically, they exhibit both large lacustrine and smaller fluvial forms.

== Lifecycle ==
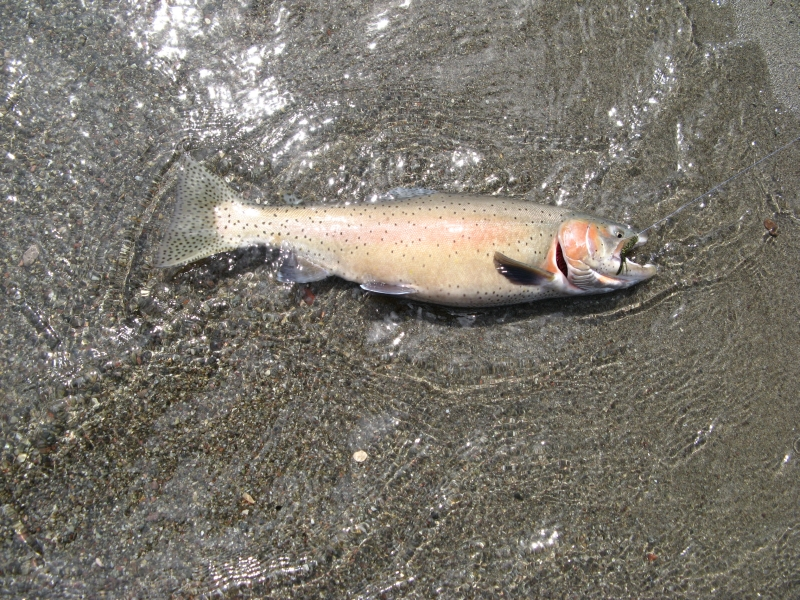
Lahontan cutthroat trout, lake form, from Pyramid Lake, Nevada

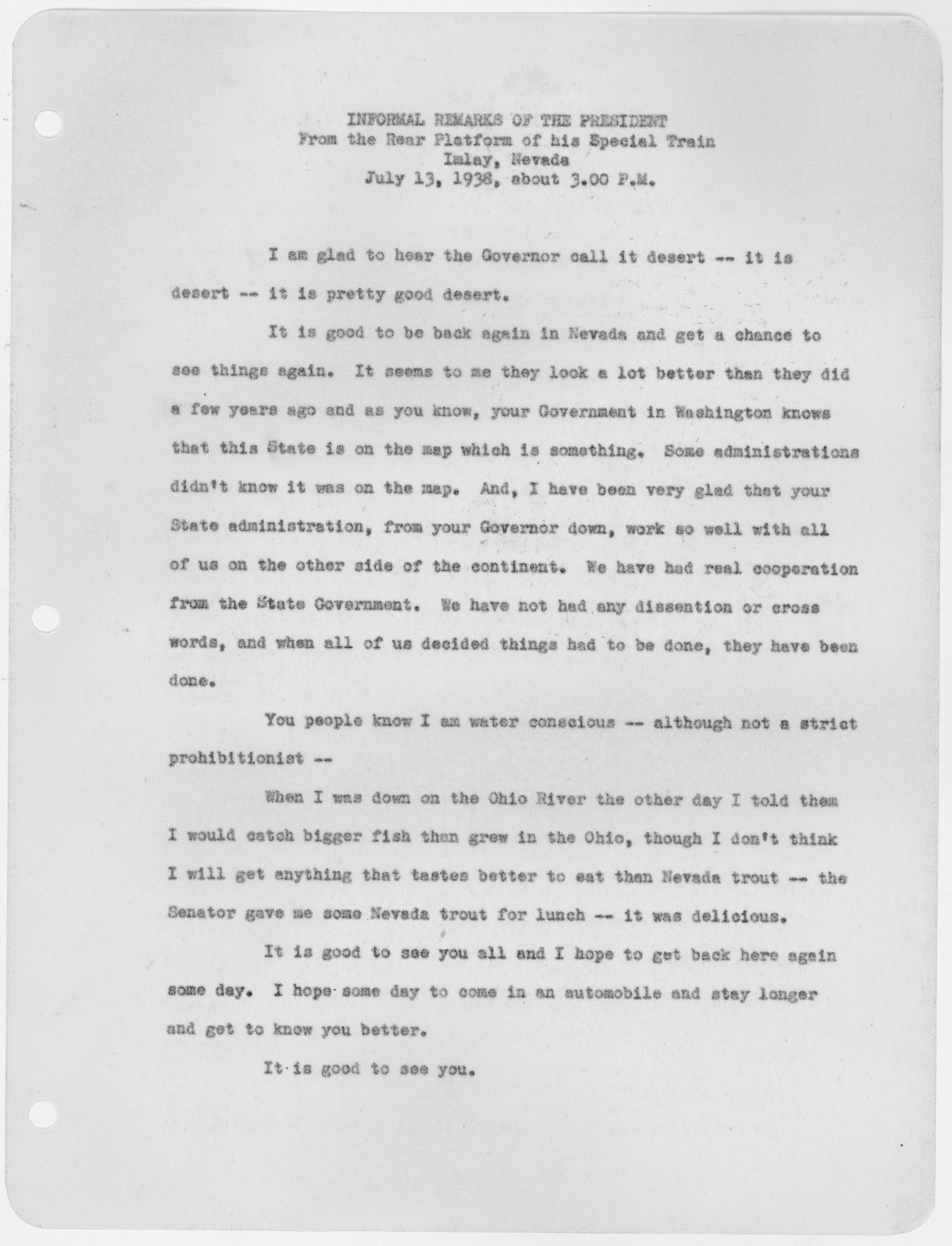
1938 remarks by Franklin Delano Roosevelt on the taste of Nevada trout

Most Lahontan cutthroat trout live a fluvial lifecycle. However, the broad diversity of environments, perhaps greater than any other cutthroat, influenced by factors such as elevation and stream characteristics, leads to a wide array of life history patterns and survival strategies. Likewise, the specific timing and duration of these stages can vary among different populations and subspecies. For example, populations at higher elevations may have shorter growing seasons and delayed maturity compared to those in lower-elevation streams. Additionally, factors such as stream flow, temperature, and food availability can significantly influence growth rates and survival throughout the lifecycle.

Populations that are born and raised in small streams tend to be less migratory and move short distances. Lacustrine populations tend to be the largest, with the Lahontan cutthroats residing in Pyramid Lake being the largest of any cutthroat trout. Historically, this population moved great distances to reach ideal spawning habitats prior to the damming of the Truckee River and other tributaries.

=== Large Lacustrine forms ===
These are a defining feature of Lahontan cutthroat trout, found in the western Lahontan Basin, including areas like the Truckee, Walker, and Carson River basins, along with Summit Lake. These lake-associated populations were historically known to grow to enormous sizes. These large lacustrine Lahontan Cutthroat Trout spawned in tributary habitats, reared in the river environment, and returned to the lake to mature.

Here, Lahontan cutthroats became a large (up to 1 m or 39 in) and moderately long-lived predator of chub suckers and other fish as long as 30 or 40 cm (16 in). The trout was able to remain a predator in the larger remnant lakes where prey fish continued to flourish.

The record-size cutthroat trout of any subspecies was a Lahontan caught in Pyramid Lake, weighing 41 lb (18.6 kg), although anecdotal and photographic evidence exists of even larger fish from this lake.

== Ecology ==
=== Range ===
The Lahontan cutthroat trout are concentrated within the Lahontan hydrographic basin. This basin covers most of northern Nevada and extends into northeastern California and southeastern Oregon. Within this large basin, the Lahontan cutthroat trout are found in several key regions, which are sometimes identified with uniquely identifiable evolutionary units or geographic management units. These include the western Lahontan Basin, encompassing the Truckee, Carson, and Walker River basins, along with important lake systems that are remnants of ancient Lake Lahontan, such as Pyramid and Walker lakes, and the Summit Lake drainage. The range also extends to the eastern Lahontan Basin, which includes the Humboldt and Reese River basins, and the northwestern Lahontan Basin, which includes the Quinn River, Coyote Lake, and Summit Lake basins. Specifically, the Willow and Whitehorse Creeks in the Coyote Lake basin represent the only historic habitat for Lahontan cutthroat trout in that part of southeastern Oregon.

=== Habitat ===
The Lahontan Basin itself contains a broad diversity of environments, which influences the array of life history patterns and survival strategies observed within the lineage. These environments range from large lacustrine habitats, remnants of ancient Lake Lahontan, to largely lower-elevation fluvial habitats, and smaller terminal lakes. This environmental diversity gives rise to different life history strategies within the Lahontan lineage. Lahontan cutthroats tend to have a higher tolerance for elevated stream temperatures and salinity content of terminal lakes than other cutthroat species.

Like other salmonids, Lahontan cutthroat trout thrive in cold, clean, and well-oxygenated waters. They are commonly found in smaller creeks, streams, and rivers with gravelly substrates, as well as large terminal lakes. Vegetation along stream banks plays a crucial role in providing shade and stabilizing the banks, reducing erosion and sediment accumulation—particularly silt—that could otherwise degrade habitat and spawning areas. Beaver ponds serve as important refuges during droughts and offer suitable overwintering conditions.

Similar to other cutthroat trout, Lahontan cutthroats exhibit an opportunistic feeding behavior with a varied diet that expands as they grow. Their primary forage, often mimicked by fly fishers, include macroinvertebrates such as caddisflies, stoneflies, mayflies and aquatic dipterans (including midges and craneflies) in adult, larval, and pupal stages. Other prey include adult terrestrial insects such as ants, beetles, spiders, grasshoppers and crickets, and aquatic items including crayfish, freshwater molluscs, fish eggs, shrimp and other crustaceans, and other fish. Their diet and feeding habits shift in response to factors like food availability, habitat conditions, age, and size.

In large endorheic lakes, Lahontan cutthroats essentially evolved in inland ocean-like conditions and became largely piscivorous, with a diet centered on the Cui-ui lakesucker, which is endemic to Pyramid Lake, the Tui chub. Here, Lahontan cutthroats became a large (up to 1 m or 39 in) and moderately long-lived predator where prey fish continued to flourish.

== Population threats ==
The extirpation of Lahontan cutthroat trout in Lake Tahoe and Pyramid Lake was primarily caused by a combination of human activities that disrupted their habitat and spawning cycles. Overfishing, habitat degradation from logging and erosion, the construction of dams and water diversions, and the introduction of non-native species all contributed to their decline. See also Pyramid Lake (Nevada)#Water quality. Lake Tahoe was historically one of several oligotrophic lakes in the Truckee River watershed that supported the large lacustrine forms of Lahontan cutthroat trout known for growing to enormous sizes. The sources indicate that these populations were extirpated from Lake Tahoe in the mid-20th century. This extirpation occurred due to the combined pressures of overharvest and the loss of access to the tributary habitats necessary for spawning. Historically, LCT in these large lakes would spawn in tributary habitat, with young rearing in the river environment before returning to the lake to mature. The disruption of this access was a critical factor. Analysis of historical museum specimens suggests that some gene flow occurred between the large lake populations of Tahoe and Pyramid, which are connected by the Truckee River, prior to their extirpation.

The discovery of the Comstock Lode in 1859 led to extensive deforestation in the Tahoe Basin, which resulted in sedimentation that covered the rocky riverbeds essential for spawning. Additionally, large-scale commercial fishing depleted their populations, with the trout being harvested and shipped to restaurants across the country. The construction of Derby Dam in the early 1900s further impacted their ability to migrate upstream to cooler waters for spawning.

As Lahontan cutthroat trout populations dwindled, non-native species such as kokanee salmon, rainbow trout, and lake trout were introduced, further outcompeting them for resources. By 1938, the last spawning of Lahontan cutthroat trout was observed below Derby Dam, marking their disappearance from Lake Tahoe.

=== Disease ===
Lahontan cutthroat trout are susceptible to a variety of diseases and parasites, which can be exacerbated by stress caused by other factors such as climate change, change in water flow regimes, habitat loss and hybridization. Whirling disease is especially damaging to native trout populations.

=== Climate change ===
Climate change poses significant threats to Lahontan cutthroat trout and related lineages. Climate change can alter habitats, leading to warming water temperatures, and changes in the timing and magnitude of stream flows, potentially resulting in more variability, droughts, and floods. Wildfire, which can also alter habitats and stream temperatures, is expected to be influenced by climatic changes. Temperature barriers are potentially a range-wide anthropogenic impact, which aligns directly with the threat of rising water temperatures due to climate warming. Climate change is noted to interact with and exacerbate existing threats. For cutthroat trout populations in general, climate change, along with wildfire, adds challenges for populations already threatened by fragmentation, disease, and nonnative species. The sources explicitly list habitat degradation and fragmentation and nonnative trout (which pose risks through hybridization, predation, and competition) as major rangewide anthropogenic impacts to Lahontan cutthroat trout. These interactions are critical, as climate change can make habitats less suitable, potentially concentrating native fish and making them more vulnerable to nonnative predators or competitors, or reducing the connectivity necessary for metapopulation persistence.

== Human history ==
The Lahontan cutthroats of Pyramid and Walker Lakes were of considerable importance to both the Paiute tribe and the Washoe tribe of Nevada and California. These trout, as well as cui-ui (Chasmistes cujus), a sucker now found only in Pyramid Lake, were dietary mainstays and were used by other tribes in the area.

When John C. Frémont and Kit Carson ascended the Truckee River on January 16, 1844, they called it the 'Salmon Trout River', after the huge Lahontan cutthroat trout that ran up the river from Pyramid Lake to spawn.

American settlements in the Great Basin nearly extirpated this species. During the 19th and early 20th centuries, Lahontan cutthroats were caught in tremendous numbers and shipped to towns and mining camps throughout the West; estimates have ranged as high as 1,000,000 lb (450,000 kg) annually between 1860 and 1920. A dam in Mason Valley blocked spawning runs from Walker Lake. By 1905, Derby Dam on the Truckee River below Reno interfered with Pyramid Lake's spawning runs. A poorly designed fish ladder washed away in 1907, and then badly timed water diversions to farms in the Fallon, Nevada, area stranded spawning fish and desiccated eggs below the dam. By 1943, Pyramid Lake's population was extinct. Lake Tahoe's population was extinct by 1930 from competition and inbreeding with introduced rainbow trout (creating cutbows), predation by introduced lake trout, and diseases introduced along with these exotic species.

Upstream populations have been isolated and decimated by poorly managed grazing and excessive water withdrawals for irrigation, as well as by hybridization, competition, and predation by non-native salmonids. This is important, as although Lahontan cutthroat trout can inhabit either lakes or streams, they are obligatory stream spawners.

== Pyramid Lake and Truckee River water quality ==
Pyramid Lake, the second-largest natural lake in the Western United States—prior to construction of the Derby Dam, which diverted water from the lake—has been the focus of several water quality investigations, the most detailed starting in the mid-1980s. Under the direction of the U.S. Environmental Protection Agency's comprehensive dynamic hydrology transport model, the Dynamic Stream Simulation and Assessment Model (DSSAM), was applied to analyze impacts of a variety of land use and wastewater management decisions throughout the 3,120-square-mile (8,100 km^{2}) Truckee River Basin. These analyses allowed more competent decisions to be made regarding the watersheds, as well as the management of treated effluent discharged to the Truckee River.

== Conservation ==
Lahontan cutthroat trout currently occupy a small fraction of their historic range. The primary obstacle to their recovery is non-native salmonid predation by brook trout (Salvelinus fontinalis) on fluvial cutthroat and lake trout (Salvelinus namaycush) on lacustrine cutthroat. Also, hybridization of cutthroat with non-native rainbow trout (Oncorhynchus mykiss) continues to threaten recovery of the pure Lahontan cutthroat. In the Truckee River and Lake Tahoe watersheds, only Independence Lake and Cascade Lake have continuously harbored the historic native lacustrine Lahontan cutthroat population. In Independence Lake, precariously low spawner numbers have recently increased along with five years of brook trout removal.

Pyramid and Walker Lakes have been restocked with fish captured in Summit Lake in Nevada and Lake Heenan in California, and those populations are maintained by fish hatcheries. Unfortunately, the Summit Lake strain does not live as long or grow as large as the original lacustrine strain of fish. However, in April 1977, fish believed to have been stocked almost a century ago from the Pyramid Lake strain were discovered by Kent Summers, a biologist for the Utah Division of Wildlife Resources, in a small unnamed stream above the western edge of the Bonneville Salt Flats and are a genetic match to the original strain. This Pilot Peak strain is now integral to the reintroduction and planting programs maintained by the U.S. Fish and Wildlife Service. Another strain of the subspecies from Independence Lake is available, and a broodstock is managed by the California Department of Fish and Wildlife at their hatchery on Hot Creek, though less is known about the suitability of Independence Lake fish to other systems.

Preservation of highly complementary habitats is crucial for the survival of the different age classes of cutthroat trout, with clean gravels needed for spawning, slow-moving side channel habitats used by juvenile fish, and deeper pool habitats such as beaver ponds for larger adult fish.

They were classified as endangered species between 1970 and 1975, then the classification was changed to threatened species in 1975, and reaffirmed as threatened in 2008.

Although Lahontan cutthroat trout stand little chance of surviving for long in Lake Tahoe, the Nevada Department of Wildlife (NDOW) planted them instead of rainbow trout on the lake's Nevada shore in summer 2011. The goal is to enable anglers to catch Lake Tahoe's native trout for the first time since 1939. The California state record was caught in Lake Tahoe in 1911 by William Pomin, weighing 31 lb 8 oz (14.3 kg).

Because it tolerates water too alkaline for other trout, Lahontan cutthroats are stocked in alkaline lakes outside its native range, including Lake Lenore (alternately Lenore Lake), Grimes Lake and Omak Lake in central Washington and Mann Lake in Oregon's Alvord Desert east of Steens Mountain.
