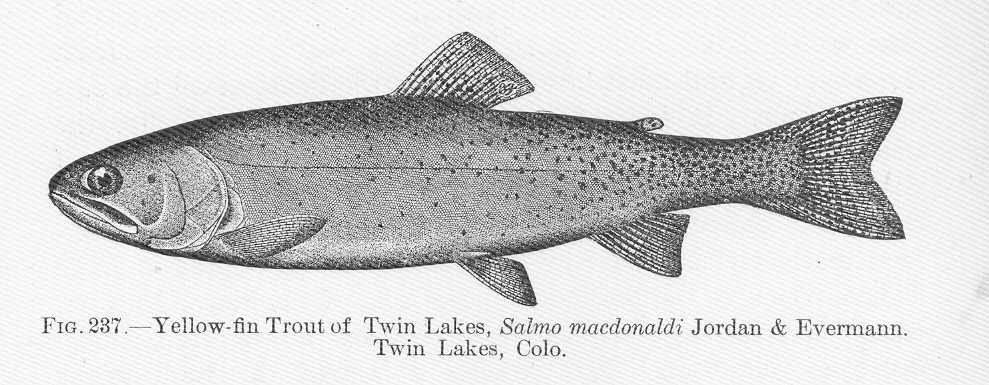
- A 1907 illustration by David Starr Jordan

Conservation status
- Presumed Extinct (NatureServe)

Scientific classification
- Kingdom: Animalia
- Phylum: Chordata
- Class: Actinopterygii
- Order: Salmoniformes
- Family: Salmonidae
- Genus: Oncorhynchus
- Species: O. clarkii
- Subspecies: O. c. macdonaldi

Trinomial name
- Oncorhynchus clarkii macdonaldi Jordan & Fisher, 1891

= Yellowfin cutthroat trout =

Extinct subspecies of fish

The yellowfin cutthroat trout (Oncorhynchus clarkii macdonaldi) is an extinct subspecies or variety of the cutthroat trout, a North American freshwater fish.

== Natural history ==
At the end of the last ice-age boulders and clay moraine blocked off a tributary of the headwaters of the Arkansas River in what is now the state of Colorado. The two lakes which formed were named the "Twin Lakes" by the area's settlers. Both lakes held small greenback cutthroat trout from the early days of the Wild West, but in the mid-1880s reports circulated of much larger trout, up to 10 pounds (5 kg) in weight, with bright yellow fins. Recent research has speculated that the yellowfin cutthroat may have been native to the entire Arkansas River basin, not just Twin Lakes.

== Discovery and naming ==
In July 1889, Professor David Starr Jordan and G. R. Fisher visited Twin Lakes and published their discoveries in the 1891 Bulletin of the United States Fish Commission. They found both the greenback and what they proclaimed to be a new species the "yellowfin cutthroat". In the species description, published in the 1890 edition of the Proceedings of the United States National Museum, Jordan and Evermann described the fish as follows:

Color, silvery olive; a broad lemon yellow shade along the sides, lower fins bright golden yellow in life, no red anywhere except the deep red dash on each side of the throat.

The subspecies was scientifically named macdonaldi after the US Fish Commissioner, Marshall McDonald.

Jordan's specimens were re-examined by the fisheries biologist Robert J. Behnke, who commented, "I have no doubt that Jordan was correct; the yellowfin trout and the greenback trout from Twin Lakes were two distinct groups of cutthroat trout".

== Extinction ==
Until about 1903, greenback and yellowfin cutthroats survived together in Twin Lakes, the populations remaining isolated as both breeders and feeders. The end for the yellowfin cutthroat came soon after the introduction of the rainbow trout to Twin Lakes. The greenback population interbred with the rainbows, resulting in cutbows, but the yellowfin disappeared completely. The yellowfin is now extinct.
