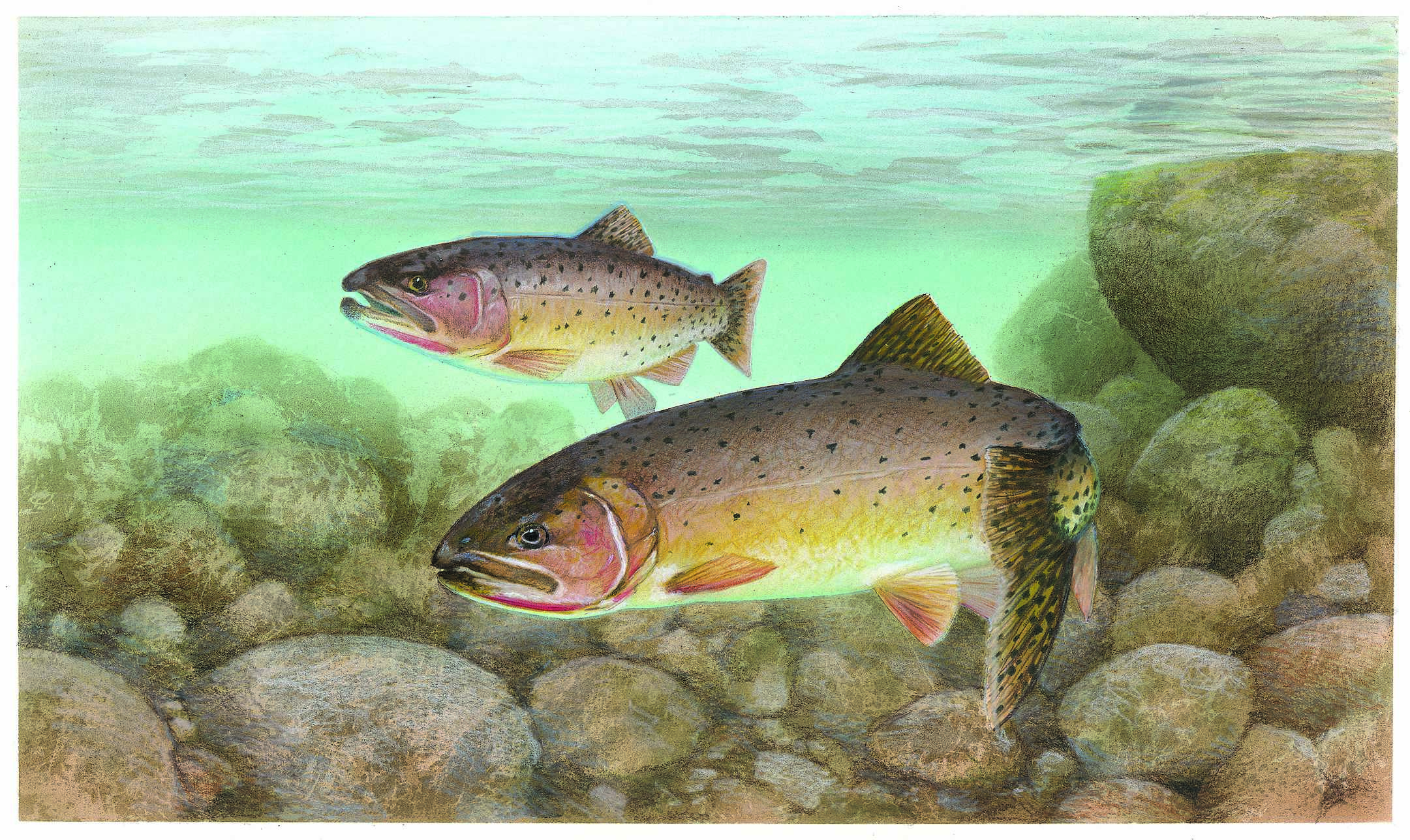
- Coastal cutthroat trout, Oncorhynchus clarkii clarkii, the type subspecies

Conservation status
- Secure (NatureServe)

Scientific classification
- Kingdom: Animalia
- Phylum: Chordata
- Class: Actinopterygii
- Division: Teleostei
- Order: Salmoniformes
- Family: Salmonidae
- Genus: Oncorhynchus
- Species: O. clarkii

Binomial name
- Oncorhynchus clarkii (Richardson, 1836)

Subspecies
- Subspecies: Oncorhynchus clarkii clarkii O. c. alvordensis† O. c. behnkei O. c. bouvierii O. c. henshawi (threatened) O. c. humboldtensis O. c. lewisi O. c. macdonaldi† O. c. pleuriticus O. c. seleniris (threatened) O. c. stomias (threatened) O. c. utah O. c. virginalis
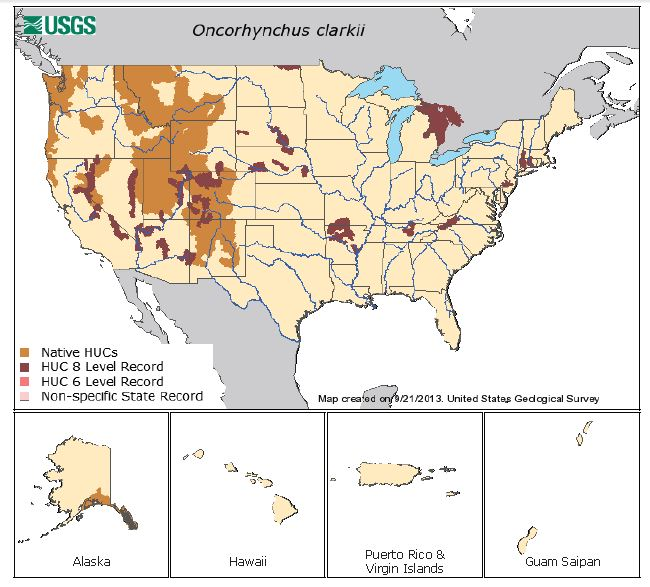
- Range map of Cutthroat trout (Onchorynchus clarkii)

Synonyms
- Other scientific names: Salmo clarkii (Richardson, 1836) Fario clarkii (Richardson, 1836) Parasalmo clarkii (Richardson, 1836) Salmo clarkii clarkii (Richardson, 1836) Salmo clarki (Richardson, 1836) Salmo clarki clarki (Richardson, 1836) Fario stellatus (Girard, 1856) Salmo stellatus (Girard, 1856) Salar lewisi (Girard, 1856) Salmo lewisi (Girard, 1856) Salmo clarki lewisi (Girard, 1856) Salmo clarkii lewisi (Girard, 1856) Salmo brevicauda (Suckley, 1861) Salmo pleuriticus (Cope, 1872) Salmo purpuratus bouvieri (Jordan & Gilbert, 1883) Salmo clarkii alpestris (Dymond, 1931) Salmo mykiss (non Walbaum, 1792) Salmo purpuratus (non Pallas, 1814)

= Cutthroat trout =

Species of fish

The cutthroat trout (Oncorhynchus clarkii clade) is a clade of four fish species of the family Salmonidae native to cold-water tributaries of the Pacific Ocean, Rocky Mountains, and Great Basin in North America. These four species are the Coastal (O. clarkii), Westslope (O. lewisi), Lahontan (O. henshawi), and the Rocky Mountain (O. virginalis). As a member of the genus Oncorhynchus, it is in the Pacific trout group, which includes the widely distributed rainbow trout. Cutthroat trout are popular gamefish, especially among anglers who enjoy fly fishing. The common name "cutthroat" refers to the distinctive red coloration on the underside of the lower jaw. The specific name clarkii was given to honor explorer William Clark, coleader of the Lewis and Clark Expedition.

Cutthroat trout usually inhabit and spawn in small to moderately large, clear, well-oxygenated, shallow rivers with gravel bottoms. They reproduce in clear, cold, moderately deep lakes. They are native to the alluvial or freestone streams that are typical tributaries of the rivers of the Pacific Basin, Great Basin and Rocky Mountains. Cutthroat trout spawn in the spring and may inadvertently but naturally hybridize with rainbow trout, producing fertile cutbows. Some populations of the coastal cutthroat trout (O. c. clarkii) are semi-anadromous.

Several subspecies of cutthroat trout are currently listed as threatened in their native ranges due to habitat loss and the introduction of non-native species. Two subspecies, O. henshawi alvordensis and O. virginalis macdonaldi, are considered extinct. Cutthroat trout are raised in hatcheries to restore populations in their native range, as well as stock non-native lake environments to support angling. The cutthroat trout type species and several subspecies are the official state fish of seven western U.S. states.

== Taxonomy ==
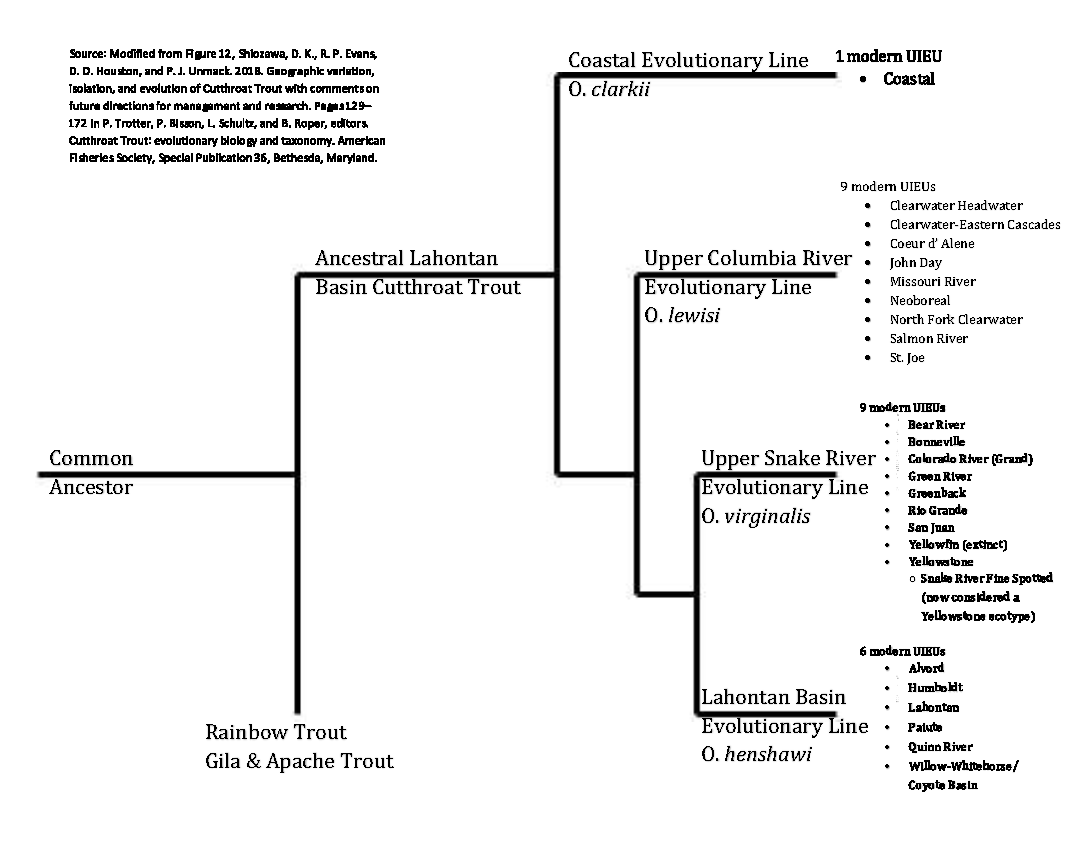
Phylogenetic map of Oncorhynchus sp.

Cutthroat trout were the first New World trout encountered by Europeans when in 1541, Spanish explorer Francisco de Coronado recorded seeing trout in the Pecos River near Santa Fe, New Mexico. These were most likely Rio Grande cutthroat trout (O. v. virginalis). The species was first described in the journals of explorer William Clark from specimens obtained during the Lewis and Clark Expedition from the Missouri River near Great Falls, Montana, and these were most likely the westslope cutthroat trout (O. l. lewisi). As one of Lewis and Clark's many missions was to describe the flora and fauna encountered during their expedition, cutthroat trout were given the name Salmo clarkii in honor of William Clark. In 1836, the type specimen of S. clarkii was described by naturalist John Richardson from a tributary of the lower Columbia River, identified as the "Katpootl", which was perhaps the Lewis River, as there was a Multnomah village of similar name at the confluence. This type specimen was most likely the coastal cutthroat trout subspecies O. c. clarkii. Until the 1960s, populations of westslope cutthroat trout and Yellowstone cutthroat trout were lumped into one subspecies; Salmo clarkii lewisii. Biologists later split the group into two subspecies, christening the name westslope cutthroat trout with the lewisii name which honors explorer Meriwether Lewis and renaming the Yellowstone cutthroat trout Salmo bouvierii, the first name given to the Yellowstone cutthroat trout by David Starr Jordan in 1883 honoring a U.S. Army Captain Bouvier.

In 1989, morphological and genetic studies indicated trout of the Pacific Basin were genetically closer to Pacific salmon (Oncorhynchus species) than to the Salmos–brown trout (S. trutta) or Atlantic salmon (S. salar) of the Atlantic Basin. Thus, in 1989, taxonomic authorities moved the rainbow, cutthroat and other Pacific Basin trout into the genus Oncorhynchus.

This single species (O. clarkii) classification is now changed. Genetic, taxonomic, and geologic studies have determined that cutthroat trout should be divided into four distinct species, with each having multiple subspecies corresponding to the evolutionary lineages found within major river basins, except for the Coastal cutthroat trout.

=== Subspecies and uniquely identifiable evolutionary units ===
Behnke in his salmon and trout handbook of 2002 recognized 14 subspecies of cutthroat trout that are each native to a separate geographic area. Not all of them were scientifically described, and different views on the taxonomic identities have been presented.

During the annual meeting of the American Fisheries Society (AFS) in 2015, the Western Division of AFS (WDAFS) hosted an expert-panel workshop to evaluate the validity of the currently recognized subspecies, using evidence both for and against. The panel found the Behnke classification scientifically indefensible, and proposed an updated phylogeny and classification that aligns with the corpus of evidence.

One specific detail the panelists were unable to resolve was how to discuss specific subsets of the population. One side favored subspecies as a valuable taxonomic rank, because they represent important information about their evolutionary and ecological history that should be recognized to preserve biodiversity. The other side disagreed, arguing that subspecies do not necessarily align with actual evolutionary units, and are simply designations of lineages within a species based on geography.

To facilitate further discussion without needing to resolve that detail, the panel used the term "uniquely identifiable evolutionary unit" (UIEU) to describe various evolutionary subunits within a species. In short, UIEUs are recognizable population groups that show independence in an evolutionary sense, but do not meet all the criteria to be considered full species.

The evolutionary history of the cutthroat trout is complex and not fully agreed upon by all scientists. What is known is that cutthroat trout were present in the then-forming Lahontan basin 10 million years ago. This, coupled with new information about drainage patterns in western rivers, suggests that the interior radiation and colonization pathways of the cutthroat trout may be substantially different than what was previously thought.

Previously, the first evolutionary theory, based on the work of David Starr Jordan and later Robert J. Behnke, proposed that an ancestral cutthroat trout from Asia entered North America and dispersed inland through the Columbia River basin. The formation of Shoshone Falls on the Snake River then isolated groups of trout, leading to the variety of subspecies seen today. Behnke later modified this theory, suggesting that the Colorado River system was invaded from the Yellowstone and not the upper Arkansas River.

More recently, an alternative theory demonstrates that cutthroat trout originated in the Bonneville Basin and then radiated outwards approximately 4 million years ago. This theory was based on their interpretation of the fossil record and DNA analysis. New evidence, particularly DNA analysis, is providing new insights into the origins and relationships of the different lineages. However, there is still much to be learned about this complex history. What is known is that repeated glacial and interglacial periods that would have caused repeated fracturing and isolation of cutthroat trout populations, eventually resulting in the different cutthroats found today.

Species	Common name	Scientific name*	Range	Image
Coastal	Coastal cutthroat trout. Also known as "sea-run" cutthroat trout.	O. clarkii (Richardson, 1836)	Native in coastal tributaries from northern California to Alaska. Lake Crescent cutthroat trout is no longer a recognized subspecies, but a unique population of the coastal cutthroat trout endemic to Lake Crescent, Washington.	O. c. clarkii Coastal cutthroat trout
Westslope	Missouri River cutthroat trout	O. l. lewisi	Native to the Missouri River drainage from the Judith River upstream to the headwaters. Captain Meriwether Lewis of the Lewis and Clark Expedition described trout caught near the Great Falls of the Missouri River in Montana on June 13, 1805.	
Westslope	Neoboreal cutthroat trout	O. l. ssp.	Largest native range of all Westslope Cutthroat, and are native to parts of the upper Columbia, Fraser and Saskatchewan watersheds in Washington, Idaho, Montana, British Columbia, and Alberta. Several disjunct populations in British Columbia that were initially classified as a distinct subspecies the Alpine Cutthroat, but based on taxonomic characteristics and genetics these populations clearly align with the Neoboreal Cutthroat.	Neoboreal Cutthroat Trout from the Middle Fork Flathead River
Westslope	Coeur d' Alene cutthroat trout	O. l. ssp.	Native to the Coeur d' Alene River drainage in Northern Idaho.	Coeur d' Alene cutthroat trout
Westslope	St. Joe cutthroat trout	O. l. ssp.	Native to the St. Joe watershed of the Idaho panhandle. Neoboreal subspecies inhabit the lower reaches of the Coeur d'Alene and St. Joe watersheds. It remains uncertain what factors distinguish them from the St. Joe Westslope Cutthroat or whether these Neoboreal fish are native to these watersheds.	St. Joe cutthroat trout
Westslope	North Fork Clearwater cutthroat trout	O. l. ssp.	Native to the North Fork Clearwater River and its tributaries including Kelly Creek in Idaho.	North Fork Clearwater cutthroat trout
Westslope	Clearwater Headwater cutthroat trout	O. l. ssp.	Restricted to the upper Selway River upstream of Selway Falls and the South Fork Clearwater approximately upstream of the Crooked River. The exact boundary is currently not known.	Clearwater Headwaters cutthroat trout
Westslope	Clearwater-Eastern Cascades cutthroat trout	O. l. ssp.	Native to the mainstem Clearwater River, Locsha, and lower Selway Rivers in Idaho, as well as the Eastern Cascade Mountains from the Methow River to the Yakima River in Washington State.	Clearwater-Eastern Cascade cutthroat trout
Westslope	Salmon River cutthroat trout	O. l. ssp.	Native to the Salmon River watershed in central Idaho.	Salmon River cutthroat trout
Westslope	John Day cutthroat trout	O. l. ssp.	Native to about 220 miles (355 km) of 41 tributaries to the John Day River watershed in Oregon. Has the smallest and southern-most range of all Westslope Cutthroat.	John Day cutthroat trout
Lahontan	Alvord cutthroat trout	O. henshawii alvordensis† Behnke, 2002	Was endemic to tributaries of Alvord Lake in southeastern Oregon; considered extinct.	
Lahontan	Quinn River cutthroat trout	O. h. ssp.	Native to the Quinn River drainage of northern Nevada and southeastern Oregon.	Quinn River cutthroat trout
Lahontan	Humboldt cutthroat trout	O. h. humboldtensis Trotter and Behnke, 2008	Upper Humboldt River. Considered by the Nevada Division of Wildlife to be a population of O. c. henshawi.	Humboldt cutthroat trout
Lahontan	Lahontan cutthroat trout	O. h. henshawi (Gill and Jordan, 1878)	Native in eastern California and western Nevada; it is designated as threatened (1975).	Lahontan cutthroat trout
Lahontan	Willow-Whitehorse Basin cutthroat trout	O. h. ssp., considered a separate subspecies by Behnke (2002), but not by Trotter and Behnke (2008).	Native to southeastern Oregon. Considered a distinct population segment of the Lahontan cutthroat trout by the U.S. Fish and Wildlife Service, and of the Humboldt cutthroat trout by Trotter and Behnke (2008).	Willow-Whitehorse Basin Cutthroat Trout
Lahontan	Paiute cutthroat trout	O. h. seleniris (J. O. Snyder, 1933)	Endemic to the eastern Sierra Nevada Mountains; it is designated as threatened (1975).	Paiute cutthroat trout
Rocky Mountain Cutthroat Trout	Rio Grande cutthroat trout	O. v. virginalis	The southernmost subspecies of cutthroat trout, native to the Rio Grande, Canadian and Pecos River drainages of New Mexico and Colorado. Despite the fact that the Canadian drainage is tributary to the Arkansas River and not the Rio Grande, genetic evidence shows they Canadian drainage from a headwater transfer from the Pecos drainage. Rio Grande cutthroat were likely native to the Davis Mountains of Texas as well.	Rio Grande cutthroat trout
Rocky Mountain Cutthroat Trout	Yellowstone cutthroat trout	O. v. bouvierii	Native to the Yellowstone and Upper Snake River drainages of Montana, Idaho, Wyoming and small areas of Utah and Nevada. The Snake River Finespotted cutthroat was once considered a distinct subspecies. However, recent genetic studies reveal that it is actually a uniquely spotted form of the Yellowstone cutthroat. Previously, the Yellowstone cutthroat was classified as a "major" subspecies of cutthroat trout, but more recent classifications now regard it as a subspecies of the Rocky Mountain cutthroat trout.	Yellowstone cutthroat trout
Rocky Mountain Cutthroat Trout	Bonneville cutthroat trout	O. v. utah	The Bonneville cutthroat evolved in ancient Lake Bonneville, which reached its peak during the last ice age, and overflowed into the Snake River. Today, most existing populations are found in small, isolated streams along the basin's edge. Additionally, there are remnant populations within the current native range of the Yellowstone cutthroat, located in a few small streams in the Raft and Portneuf River drainages in Idaho, from when ancient Lake Bonneville overflowed into the Snake River drainage during the last ice age.	Bonneville cutthroat trout
Rocky Mountain Cutthroat Trout	Bear River cutthroat trout	O. v. ssp.	Native to the Bear River watershed at the Idaho, Utah, and Wyoming border. The Bear River cutthroat were lumped with the Bonneville cutthroat as a single subspecies until recently. Genetic studies show they are actually more closely related to the Yellowstone cutthroat than to the Bonneville cutthroat. Geological evidence suggests that the Bear River flowed into the Snake River until about 500,000 years ago, when volcanic activity redirected the river south into its own basin and formed ancient Lake Thatcher. The connection to the Bonneville Basin likely occurred around 20,000 years ago when Lake Thatcher overflowed into ancient Lake Bonneville. Genetic evidence indicates a distinctiveness from Bonneville cutthroat, and is recognized as a distinct subspecies.	Bear River Cutthroat Trout
Rocky Mountain Cutthroat Trout	Yellowfin cutthroat trout	O. v. macdonaldi†	Native to the Twin Lakes of the Arkansas River drainage in Colorado. The Yellowfin cutthroat shared its habitat with the greenback cutthroat trout, but was distinguished by its morphology and life history. After the introduction of rainbow trout into Twin Lakes, the Yellowfin cutthroat trout went extinct. Recent research has speculated that the Yellowfin cutthroat may have been native to the entire Arkansas River basin, not just Twin Lakes. Efforts are underway with hopes of locating a lost population. A rare strain of cutthroat from Hayden Creek, tributary to the Arkansas River, was rescued from a fire in 2016, and used to reestablish populations around the basin. These are the only known fish to share genetics with Yellowfin cutthroat.	Yellowfin Cutthroat
Rocky Mountain Cutthroat Trout	Colorado River cutthroat trout	O. v. pleuriticus	Sometimes referred to as the "green lineage" in scientific literature. Native to the Dolores, Colorado, and Gunnison River Basins. Some small populations existed in Utah.	Colorado River cutthroat trout
Rocky Mountain Cutthroat Trout	Green River cutthroat trout	O. v. ssp.	Historically lumped into the Colorado River cutthroat, and native to the White, Yampa, and upper Green River watersheds, extending from northwest Colorado, southwest Wyoming, and into eastern and central Utah. Sometimes referred to as the "blue lineage" in scientific literature. Stocking programs using wild eggs collected from Trappers Lake in the early 1900s has resulted in pure, healthy populations - sometimes well outside its native range.	Green River cutthroat trout
Rocky Mountain Cutthroat Trout	San Juan cutthroat trout	O. v. ssp.	Also lumped in with the Colorado River cutthroat. Native to San Juan River and its tributaries across small portions of the Four Corners region. This trout was formally re-discovered in 2012, by analyzing the genetics of two museum specimens obtained from the basin in 1874. Between 2012 and mid-2018, it was presumed extinct, until a handful of populations were discovered near the San Juan National Forest. The 416 Fire prompted a hasty rescue of pure specimens from two remote creeks, and have been used to establish a brood stock and restore populations around the basin.	San Juan cutthroat trout
Rocky Mountain Cutthroat Trout	Greenback cutthroat trout	O. v. stomias (threatened)	Native to the South Platte River basin, though also considered native to the Arkansas basin at one time. It was considered extinct by the 1930s, until a population was discovered in Rocky Mountain National Park in 1957. This led to extensive progress towards reestablishing populations across Colorado. However, in 2012, genetic testing revealed that the trout used in the many-decade reintroduction program were Colorado River or Rio Grande cutthroats, and that the only remaining population of pure greenbacks were in a 4-mile (6.4 km) stretch of Bear Creek, a tributary of the Arkansas River. Several populations have since been established using this pure broodstock. Colorado Parks and Wildlife announced in 2022 that the wild spawning of greenbacks had been observed.	Greenback cutthroat trout
*as proposed by Love Stowell, et al. 2018.

== Description ==
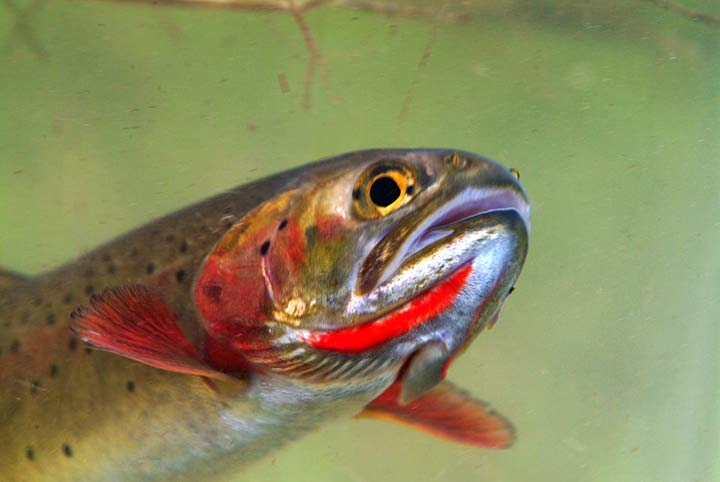
Head of Yellowstone cutthroat trout (O. c. bouvierii), showing the characteristic red bands under the gill covers and mandibles

Throughout their native and introduced ranges, cutthroat trout vary widely in size, coloration and habitat selection. Their coloration can range from golden to gray to green on the back. Cutthroat trout can generally be distinguished from rainbow trout by the presence of basibranchial teeth at the base of tongue and a maxillary that extends beyond the posterior edge of the eye. Depending on subspecies, strain and habitat, most have distinctive red, pink, or orange linear marks along the underside of their mandibles in the lower folds of the gill plates. These markings are responsible for the common name "cutthroat", first given to the trout by outdoor writer Charles Hallock in an 1884 article in The American Angler. These markings are not unique to the species. Some coastal rainbow trout (Oncorhynchus mykiss irideus) and Columbia River redband trout (O. m. gairdneri) populations also display reddish or pink throat markings.

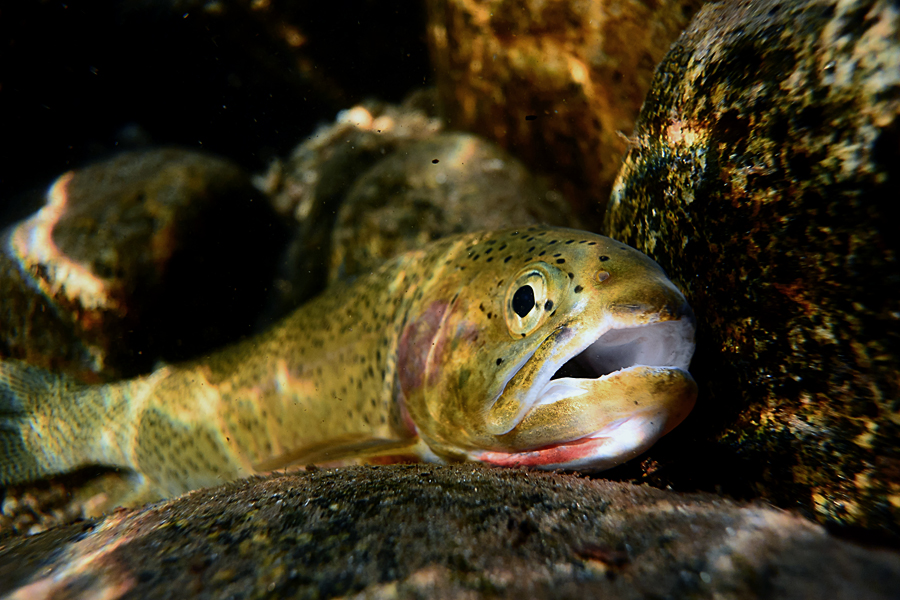

At maturity, different populations and subspecies of cutthroat trout can range from 6 to 40 inches (15 to 102 cm) in length, depending on habitat and food availability. Sea-run forms of coastal cutthroat trout average 2 to 5 pounds (0.9 to 2.3 kg). The length and weights of mature inland forms vary widely depending on their particular environment and availability of food. Stream-resident fish are much smaller, 0.4 to 3.2 ounces (11 to 91 g), while lacustrine populations have attained weights ranging from 12 to 17 lb (5.4 to 7.7 kg) in ideal conditions. The largest cutthroat trout subspecies is the Lahontan cutthroat trout (O. h. henshawi). These fish average 8 to 9 in (20 to 23 cm) in small streams and 8 to 22 in (20 to 56 cm) in larger rivers and lakes. In ideal environments, the Lahontan cutthroat trout attains typical weights of 0.25 to 8 lb (0.11 to 3.63 kg). The world record cutthroat trout is a Lahontan at 39 in (99 cm) and 41 lb (19 kg).

=== Lifecycle ===
Cutthroat trout usually inhabit and spawn in small to moderately large, clear, well-oxygenated, shallow rivers with gravel bottoms. They are native to the alluvial or freestone streams typical of tributaries of the Pacific Basin, Great Basin and Rocky Mountains. They spawn in the spring, as early as February in coastal rivers and as late as July in high mountain lakes and streams. Spawning begins when water temperatures reach 43 to 46 °F (6 to 8 °C). Cutthroat trout construct a redd in the stream gravel to lay eggs. The female selects the site for and excavates the redd. Females, depending on size, lay between 200 and 4,400 eggs. Eggs are fertilized with milt (sperm) by an attending male. Eggs hatch into alevins or sac fry in about a month and spend two weeks in the gravel while they absorb their yolk sack before emerging. After emergence, fry begin feeding on zooplankton. Juvenile cutthroat trout typically mature in three to five years. Lake-resident cutthroat trout are usually found in moderately deep, cool lakes with adequate shallows and vegetation for good food production. Lake populations generally require access to gravel-bottomed streams to be self-sustaining, but occasionally spawn on shallow gravel beds with good water circulation.

Cutthroat trout naturally interbreed with the closely related rainbow trout, producing fertile hybrids commonly called "cutbows". This hybrid generally bears similar coloration and overall appearance to the cutthroat trout, usually retaining the characteristic orange-red slash. Cutbow hybrids often pose a taxonomic difficulty when trying to distinguish any given specimen as a rainbow or cutthroat trout. In addition, cutthroat trout may hybridize with O. gilae, the Gila trout and O. apache, the Apache trout in regions where their ranges overlap.

== Ecology ==
=== Range ===
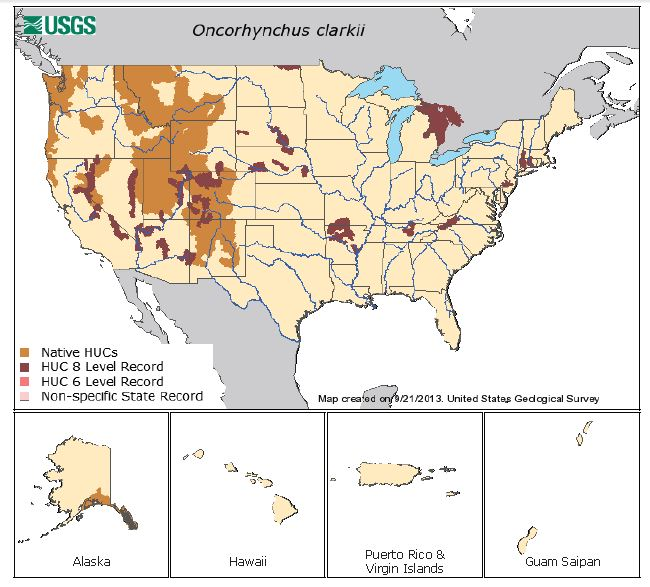
Native and non-native U.S. range for O. clarkii, cutthroat trout

Cutthroat trout are native to western North America and have evolved through geographic isolation into at least 25 genetically-recognizable lineages, each native to a different major drainage basin. Native cutthroat trout species are found along the Pacific Northwest coast from Alaska through British Columbia into northern California, in the Cascade Range, the Great Basin and throughout the Rocky Mountains including southern Alberta. Some coastal populations of the coastal cutthroat trout (O. c. clarkii) are semi-anadromous, spending a few months in marine environments to feed as adults and returning to fresh water from fall through early spring to feed on insects and spawn. Cutthroat trout have the second-largest historic native range of North American trout; the lake trout (Salvelinus namaycush) having the largest. Ranges of some subspecies, particularly the westslope cutthroat trout (O. l. lewisi), have been reduced to less than 10 percent of their historic range due to habitat loss and introduction of non-native species.

Although members of Oncorhynchus, the Pacific trout/salmon species, multiple lineages evolved populations east of the Continental Divide in the upper Missouri River basin, upper Arkansas and Platte River basins and upper Yellowstone River basin, each which drain into the Atlantic basin via the Mississippi River (in 2005, researchers published a report stating that a natural distribution of (O. mykiss), the Conchos trout, is also located in an Atlantic basin drainage). Scientists believe that the climatic and geologic conditions 3–5 million years ago allowed cutthroat trout from the Snake River to migrate over the divide into the Yellowstone plateau via Two Ocean Pass. There is also evidence that Yellowstone Lake once drained south into the Snake River drainage. Evidence suggests that the westslope cutthroat trout was able to establish populations east of the divide via Summit Lake at Marias Pass which at one time connected the Flathead River drainage with the upper Missouri River drainage. Scientists speculate that there are several mountain passes associated with the headwaters of the Colorado River drainage and Arkansas/Platte River drainages that would have allowed migration of cutthroat trout east of the divide.

Cutthroat trout have been introduced into non-native waters outside their historic native range, but not to the extent of the rainbow trout (O. mykiss). Within the native range of the Yellowstone cutthroat trout, U.S. Fisheries Bureau and National Park Service authorities introduced Yellowstone cutthroat trout into many fishless lakes in Yellowstone National Park. Cutthroat trout were introduced into Lake Michigan tributaries in the 1890s and sporadically in the early 20th century, but never established wild populations. A population of Yellowstone cutthroat trout purportedly has been established in Lake Huron. Cutthroat are routinely introduced by the Arizona Game and Fish Department into high mountain lakes in the White Mountains in the northeastern region of that state.

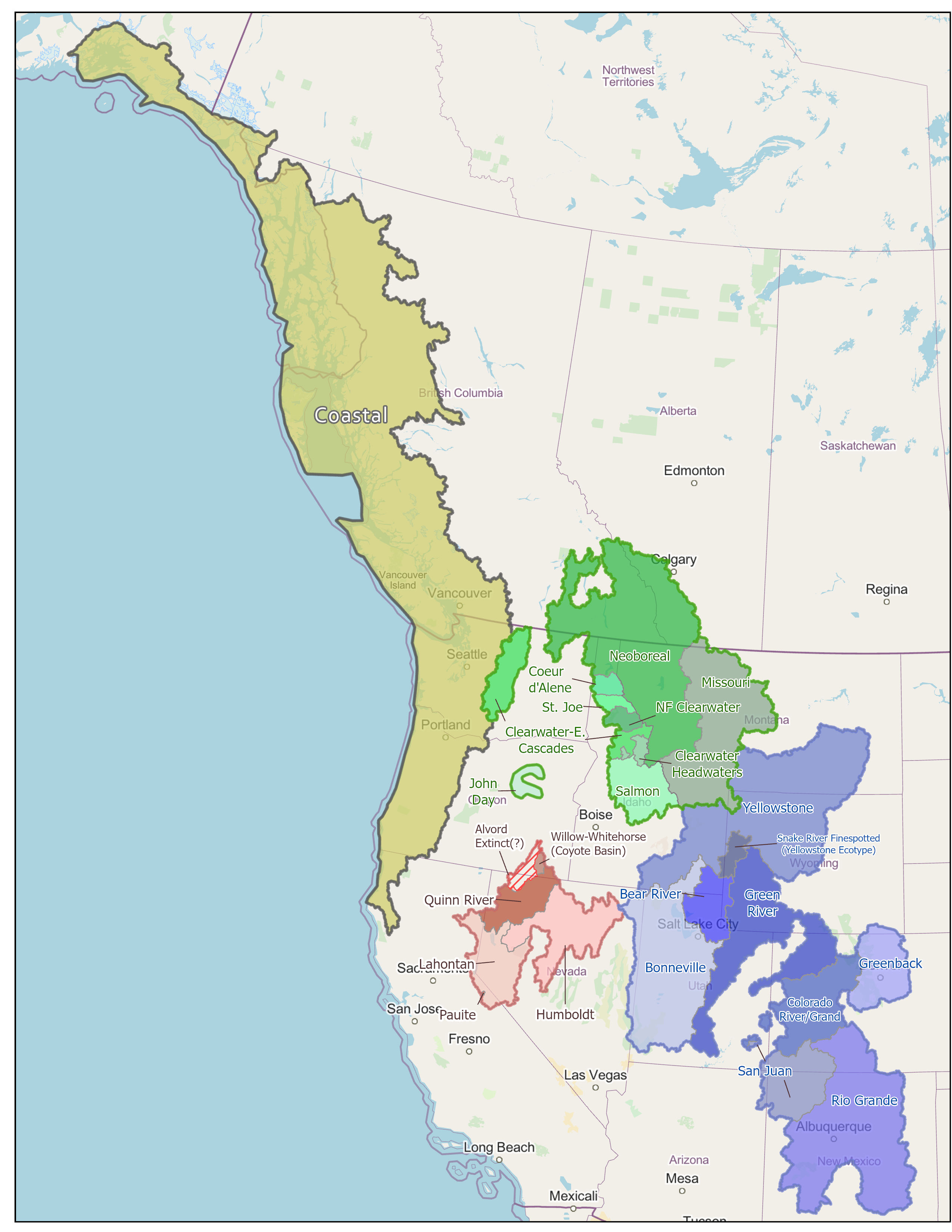
Distribution of Cutthroat Trout Evolutionary Units

=== Habitat ===
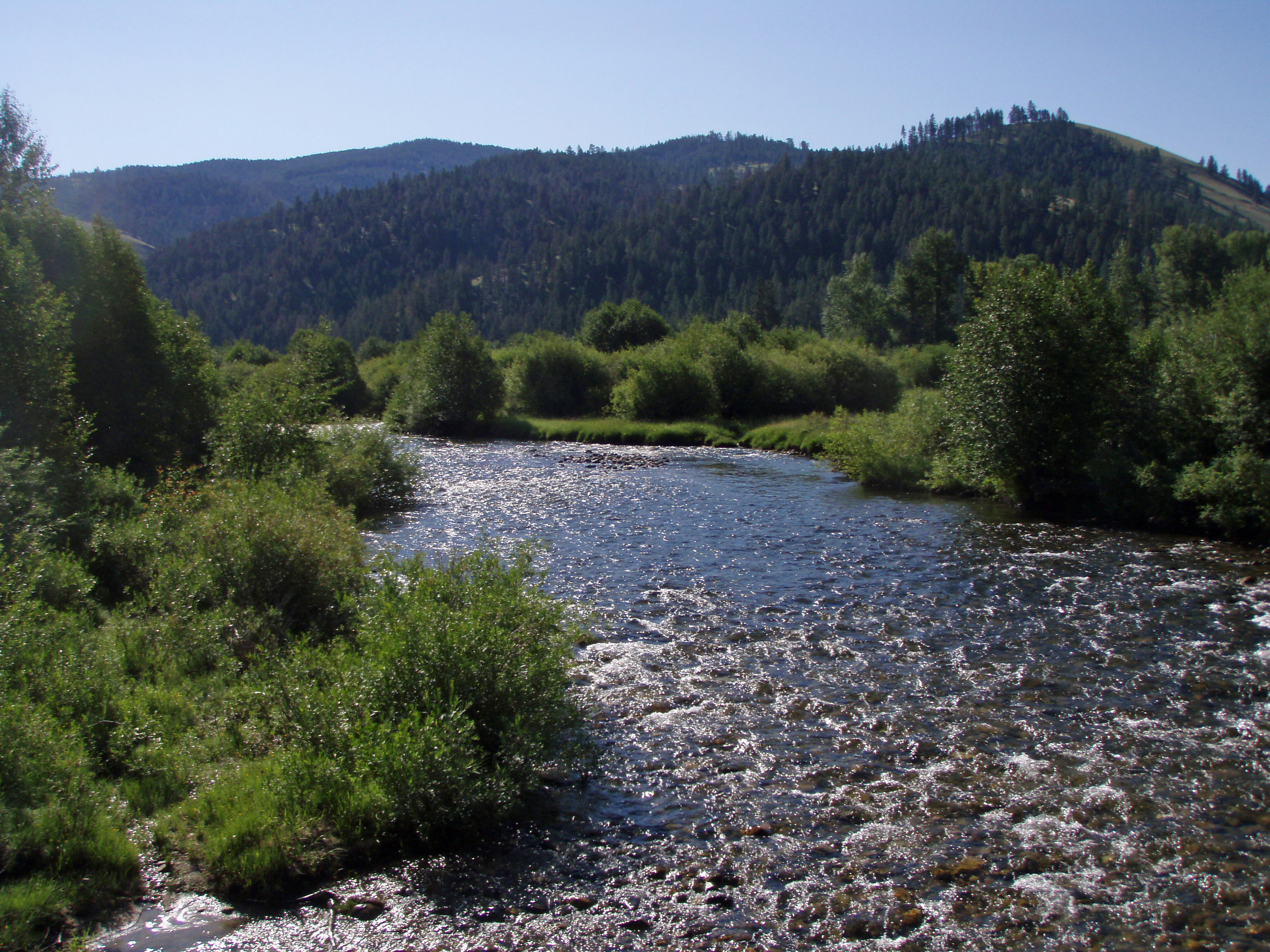
Typical cutthroat trout habitat in the East Fork of the Bitterroot River, Sula, Montana

Cutthroat trout require cold, clear, well-oxygenated, shallow rivers with gravel bottoms or cold, moderately deep lakes. Healthy stream-side vegetation that reduces siltation is typical of healthy cutthroat trout habitat and beaver ponds may provide refuge during periods of drought and over winter. Most populations stay in fresh water throughout their lives and are known as nonmigratory, stream-resident or riverine populations. The coastal cutthroat trout (O. clarkii) is the only cutthroat trout subspecies to coevolve through its entire range with the coastal rainbow trout (O. m. irideus). Portions of the Westslope cutthroat trout's (O. lewisi) range overlap with the Columbia River redband trout (O. m. gairdneri), but the majority of its native range is in headwater tributary streams above major waterfalls and other barriers to upstream migration. At least three subspecies are confined to isolated basins in the Great Basin and can tolerate saline or alkaline water.

Cutthroat trout are opportunistic feeders. Stream-resident cutthroat trout primarily feed on larval, pupal and adult forms of aquatic insects (typically caddisflies, stoneflies, mayflies and aquatic dipterans), and adult forms of terrestrial insects (typically ants, beetles, grasshoppers and crickets) that fall into the water, fish eggs, small fish, along with crayfish, shrimp and other crustaceans. As they grow the proportion of fish consumed increases in most populations. In saltwater estuaries and along beaches, Coastal cutthroat trout feed on small fish such as sculpins, sand lance, salmon fry and herring. They also consume shrimp, small squid and krill. In fresh water, they consume the same diet as stream resident trout—aquatic insects and crustaceans, amphibians, earthworms, small fish and fish eggs. Within the range of the bull trout (Salvelinus confluentus) the cutthroat trout is a forage fish for the piscivorous bull trout.

=== Artificial propagation ===
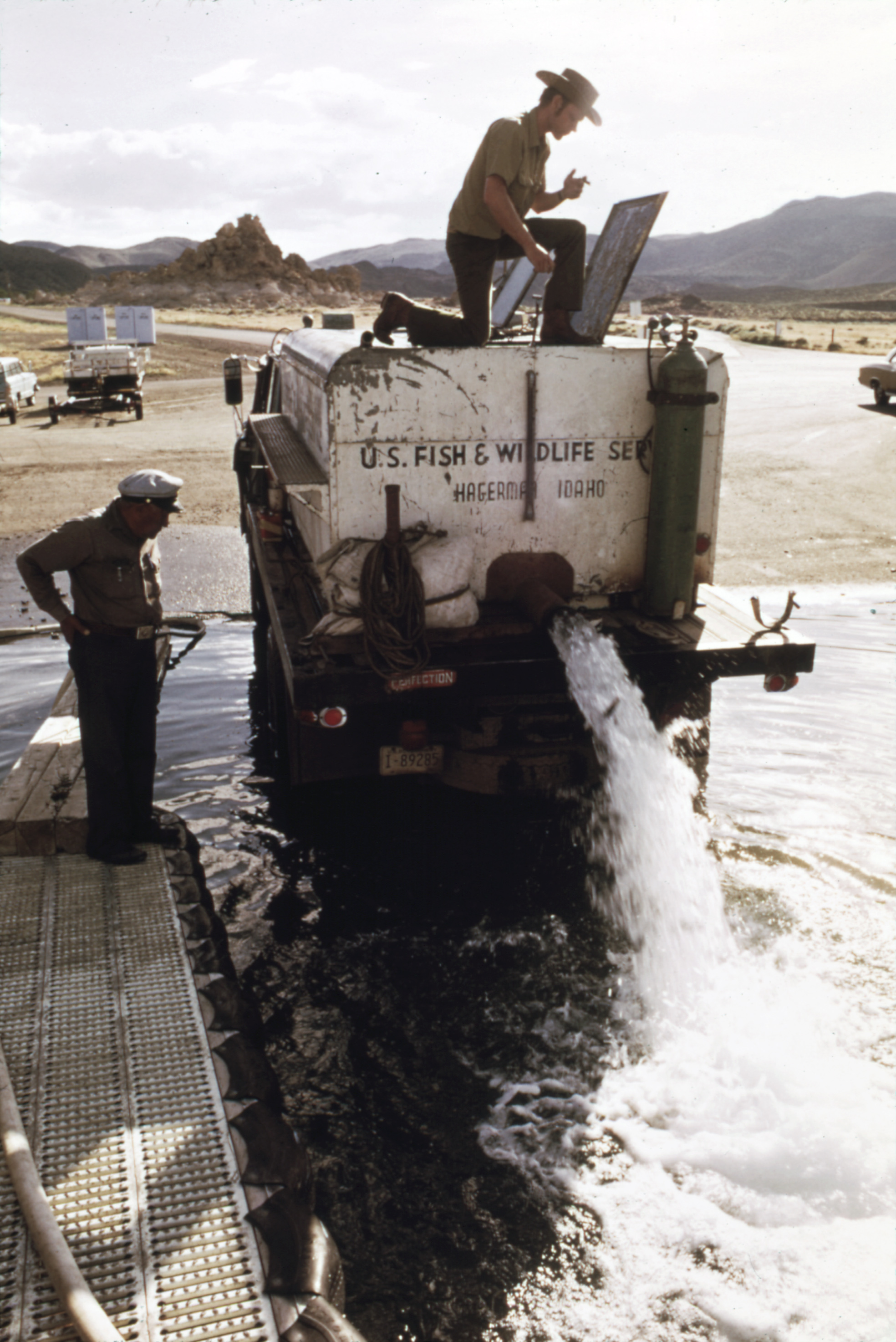
Stocking cutthroat trout at Pyramid Lake in Nevada in 1973

Various subspecies of cutthroat trout are raised in commercial, state and federal hatcheries for introduction into suitable native and non-native riverine and lacustrine environments. In the early 20th century, several hatcheries were established in Yellowstone National Park by the U.S. Bureau of Fisheries. These hatcheries not only produced stocks of the Yellowstone cutthroat trout (O. v. bouvierii) for the park, but also took advantage of the great spawning stock of cutthroat trout to supply eggs to hatcheries around the U.S. Between the years 1901 and 1953 a total of 818 million trout eggs were exported from the park to hatcheries throughout the U.S. The Lahontan National Fish Hatchery operated by the U.S. Fish and Wildlife Service exists to restore populations of the Lahontan cutthroat trout (O. h. henshawi) in Pyramid, Walker, Fallen Leaf, June, Marlette, and Gull Lakes and the Truckee River in California and Nevada. The hatchery produces about 300,000–400,000 Lahontan cutthroat trout fry annually. The Jackson National Fish Hatchery produces around 400,000 Snake River fine-spotted cutthroat trout (which is now known as an ecotype of the Yellowstone cutthroat) annually to support fisheries in Idaho and Wyoming. The Leadville National Fish Hatchery produces 125,000–200,000 Snake River fine-spotted, greenback cutthroat and rainbow trout annually to support fishing in the Fryingpan and Arkansas River drainages and other Colorado waters. The Bozeman Fish Technology Center, formerly a cutthroat trout fish hatchery in Bozeman, Montana, plays a major role in the restoration of the greenback (O. v. stomias) and Westslope cutthroat trout (O. lewisi).

== Population threats ==
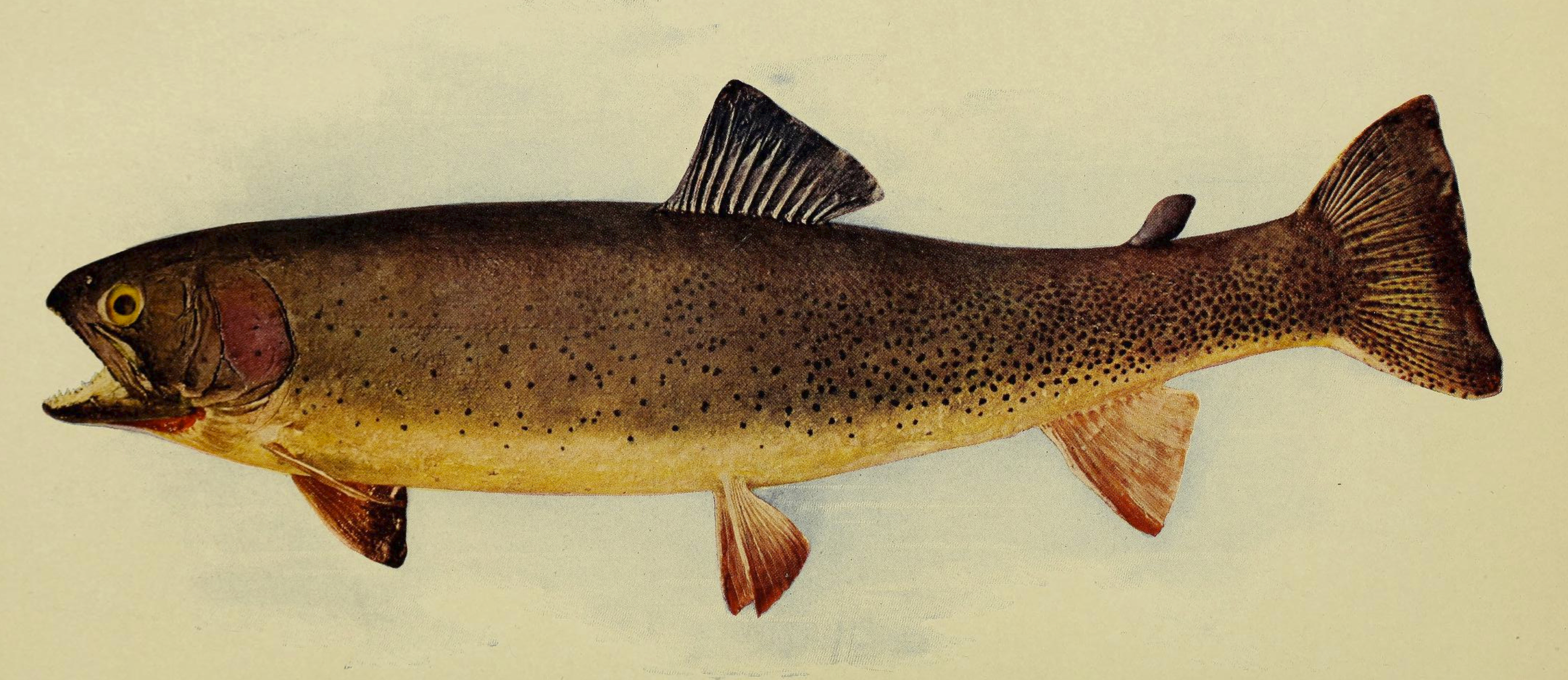
Yellowstone cutthroat trout from Birds and Nature, 1904

The historic native range of cutthroat trout has been reduced by overfishing, urbanization and habitat loss due to mining, livestock grazing and logging. Population densities have been reduced and in some cases populations have disappeared though competition with non-native brook, brown, lake and rainbow trout, kokanee salmon, lake whitefish and mysis shrimp which were introduced in the late 19th and early 20th centuries. Scientists believe the westslope cutthroat trout will eventually be extirpated from the large lakes in Western Montana due to the trophic cascades resulting from lake trout and mysis shrimp introductions, and a majority of Rio Grande Cutthroat Trout populations are thought to have a low chance of surviving into the 2080s. The most serious current threats to several subspecies are interspecific breeding with introduced rainbow trout, creating hybrid cutbows, and intraspecific breeding with other introduced cutthroat trout subspecies. In the Greater Yellowstone Ecosystem, the presence of lake trout (Salvelinus namaycush) in Yellowstone Lake in Yellowstone National Park has caused a serious decline in Yellowstone cutthroat trout (O. v. bouvierii). Outbreaks of whirling disease in major spawning tributaries within the native ranges have also caused declines. Most subspecies of cutthroat trout are highly susceptible to whirling disease, although the Snake River fine-spotted cutthroat trout appears to be resistant to the parasite.

=== Interspecific and intraspecific breeding ===
The most serious impact on the genetic purity of most cutthroat trout subspecies results from interspecific and intraspecific breeding resulting in hybrids that carry the genes of both parents. In inland populations, the introduction of rainbow trout from hatchery stocks have resulted in cutbow hybrids that continue to diminish the genetic purity of many cutthroat trout subspecies. The introduction of hatchery-raised Yellowstone cutthroat trout into native ranges of other cutthroat trout subspecies, particularly the westslope cutthroat trout, has resulted in intraspecific breeding and diminished genetic purity of the westslope subspecies. As such, populations of genetically pure westslope cutthroat trout are very rare and localized in streams above barriers to upstream migrations by introduced species. Fisheries biologist Robert J. Behnke attributes the extinction of the yellowfin cutthroat trout (O. v. macdonaldi) and Alvord cutthroat trout (O. h. alvordensis) subspecies to the introduction of non-native rainbow trout.

=== Decline of the Yellowstone subspecies ===
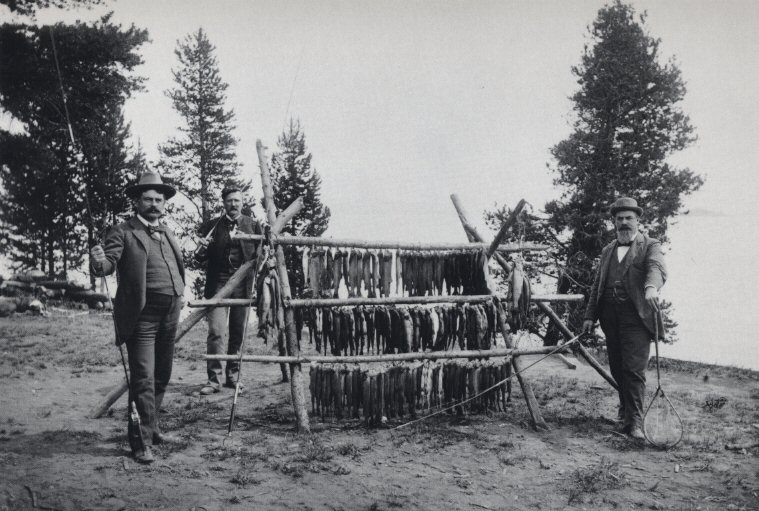
Anglers at West Thumb, 1897, with a harvest of Yellowstone cutthroat trout

The population at the core of the Yellowstone cutthroat trout's native range, in Yellowstone Lake, declined significantly in the 1960s due to overharvest of mature cutthroat trout by anglers, as well as overharvesting of eggs by hatcheries in the early 20th century. Managers implemented catch and release, which required anglers to return their catches to the lake, and they terminated hatchery operations in the park, which allowed the cutthroat trout to recover. Then, in 1994, park officials discovered lake trout (Salvelinus namaycush) in Yellowstone Lake. Although lake trout were established in Shoshone, Lewis and Heart Lakes in the Snake River drainage from U.S. government stocking operations in 1890, they were never officially introduced into the Yellowstone River drainage and their presence there is probably the result of accidental or illegal introductions. By 2000, the cutthroat trout population had declined to less than 10 percent of its early 20th century abundance.

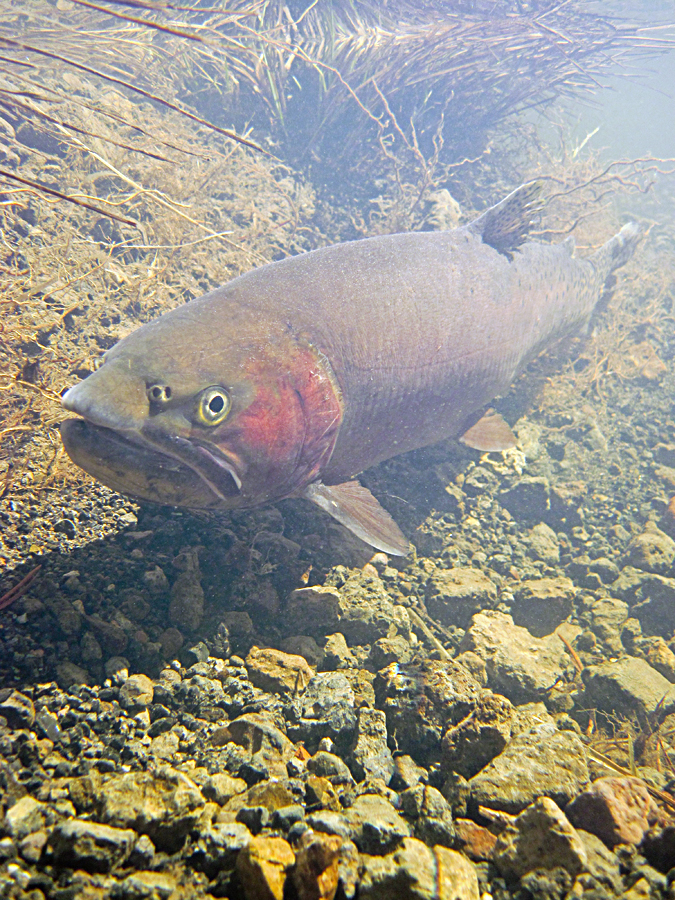
Yellowstone Lake cutthroat trout

However, aggressive lake trout eradication programs have killed over 1 million lake trout since 1996, and the hope is that this will lead to a restoration of cutthroat numbers. Cutthroat trout co-exist with lake trout in Heart Lake, an isolated back-country lake at the head of the Heart River that gets little angling pressure.

=== Habitat Risks ===
Cutthroat trout also face potential risks from habitat disturbances such as stream drying, increasing water temperatures, and wildfire. However, the present effect of many of these risks is mitigated because cutthroat trout, which prefer colder temperatures than rainbow trout, have often been forced into colder, higher streams. For example, Rio Grande Cutthroat trout, which occupied 12% of their original range as of 2019, are largely limited to cold, high-elevation headwaters. As a result, projected warming by 2080 does not result in any current reaches becoming entirely unsuitable, with factors related to invasive species as the major predictors of persistence.

== Angling ==
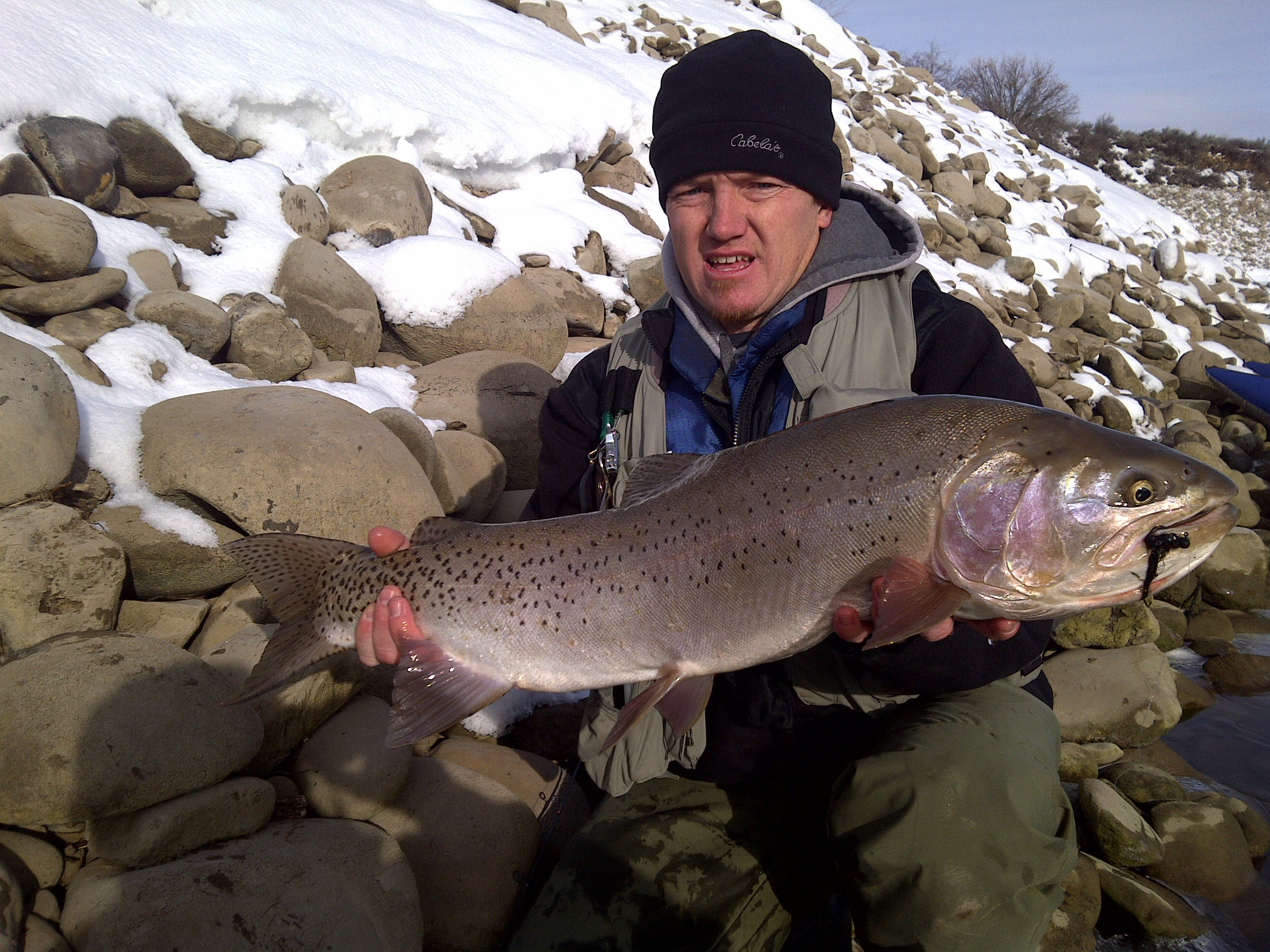
This 31.5-inch (80 cm) cutthroat trout set a new Utah state record. As of March 26, 2011, it was the largest cutthroat trout ever caught and released in Utah.

Cutthroat trout are prized as a gamefish, particularly by fly anglers. They are regulated as a gamefish in every state and province they occur in. From the Yellowstone cutthroat trout fishery in Yellowstone National Park, the unique Lahontan cutthroat trout fishery in Pyramid Lake in Nevada, and the small stream fisheries of the westslope cutthroat trout to saltwater angling for sea-run cutthroat trout on the Pacific coast, cutthroat trout are a popular quarry for trout anglers throughout their ranges. The all-tackle world record is 41 lb (19 kg) caught in Pyramid Lake in December 1925. Their propensity to feed on aquatic and terrestrial insects make them an ideal quarry for the fly angler.

=== Sea-run fishing along the Pacific Coast ===
From Alaska to Northern California, coastal cutthroat trout in sea-run, resident stream and lacustrine forms are sought by anglers. Puget Sound in Washington is a stronghold of sea-run cutthroat trout fishing with its many tributaries and protected saltwater inlets and beaches. Fly anglers search for sea-run cutthroat trout along beaches, river mouths and estuaries year round. In the lower reaches of larger rivers, anglers in drift boats float the rivers searching for trout along the wooded shorelines. In addition to a cutthroat trout sport fishery managed by the Alaska Department of Fish and Game, the Federal Subsistence Management Program manages coastal cutthroat trout subsistence fisheries in Southeast Alaska.

=== Yellowstone fishery ===
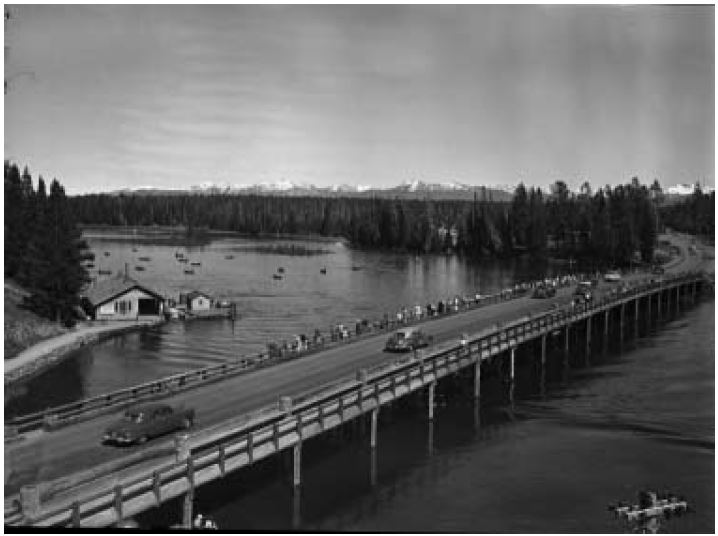
Fishing Bridge ca. 1951 in Yellowstone National Park

Yellowstone National Park was established in 1872. By the 1890s, the Yellowstone cutthroat trout fishery in the Yellowstone River and Yellowstone Lake were well known and being promoted in national guidebooks.

Fishing Grounds.—In the river at the lake outlet are the fishing grounds, about a mile from the hotel, while at many places between the lake and canyon excellent fishing is had from shore. The best results in the outlet are had from row boats; they can be rented from the steamboat company who have a supply, as well as competent and experienced oarsmen. Not more than two can successfully fish from one boat. When the grounds are reached, have the oarsman occupy the "stern," as from this position he can manipulate the landing net to a better advantage, the anchor is attached to the "bow." During the trout season (July to September), no better fishing can be found. They average about one and one-half pounds each and are of the salmon myhiss [sic] variety—a catch of 100, three or four hours before sundown, is not unfrequent.

— A. B. Guptill, Haynes Guide to Yellowstone Park (1896)

In 1902, anticipating the completion of the east entrance road from Cody, Wyoming, Captain Hiram M. Chittenden supervised the construction of the first "Fishing Bridge" across the outlet of Yellowstone Lake. Fishing Bridge was rebuilt in 1919, and reconstructed in 1937, primarily to accommodate vehicle traffic. Between 1916 and 1931, a large development of campgrounds, cabins, stores and service facilities were built just east of the bridge to support anglers. This area is now known as the Fishing Bridge Historic District. The 1937 bridge boasted pedestrian walkways on either side of the roadway to give more room to anglers. Angling in the river, at Fishing Bridge and in the lake, boomed during the 1950s and 1960s and over harvest caused a significant decline in the fishery. Consequently, in 1973, fishing was no longer permitted from Fishing Bridge.

=== Pyramid Lake Lahontan subspecies fishery ===
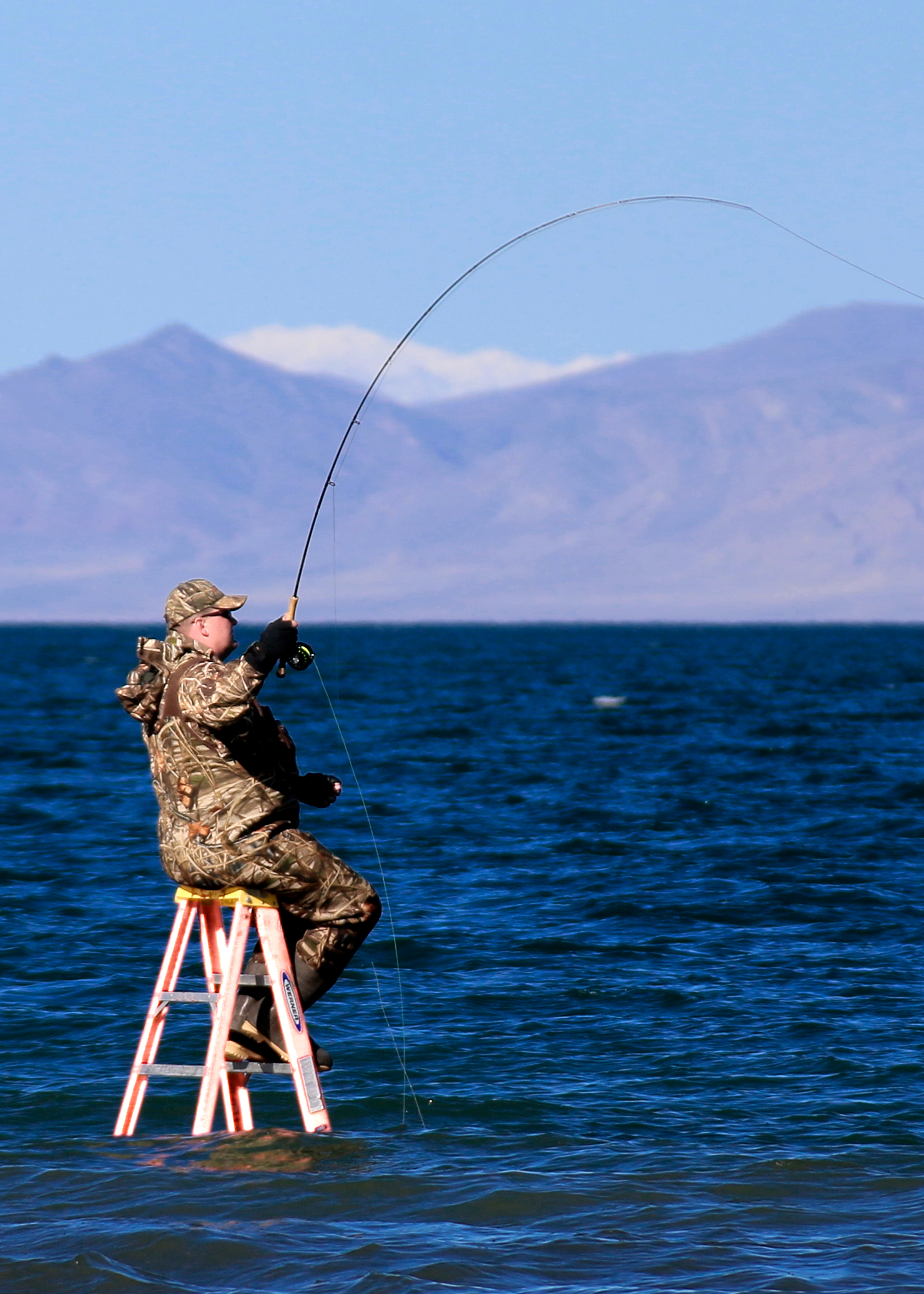
Angler fishing for Lahontan cutthroat trout in Pyramid Lake

The Pyramid Lake strain of the Lahontan cutthroat trout, source of the 41-pound (19 kg) world record and native to Pyramid Lake, Lake Tahoe and the Truckee River, was brought to near-extinction in the two decades between the 1920s-40s from overharvest, introduced species and loss of spawning habitat. In the 1970s, Pyramid Lake was stocked with Lahontan cutthroat trout strains still surviving in some nearby lakes, but they were not the large Pyramid Lake strain. Although the Pyramid Lake Paiute Tribe had been successful in re-establishing a cutthroat trout fishery on the reservation in Pyramid Lake, the cutthroat trout were not the large fish of the late 19th and early 20th century. In the late 1970, biologists discovered a surviving population of a pure Pyramid Lake strain in a small headwaters stream on the Nevada-Utah border that had at some point around 1900 been introduced into the stream. In 1995, the U.S. Fish and Wildlife Service began rearing these fish in the Lahontan National Fish Hatchery in Gardnerville, Nevada. In 2006, the Pyramid Lake strain of Lahontan cutthroat trout were reintroduced into the lake. As Pyramid Lake has a very shallow shoreline, anglers use ladders to stand comfortably in 3 to 4 feet (0.9 to 1.2 m) of water and cast to trout cruising along shoreline breaks. Considered a "world-class" fishery, anglers routinely catch cutthroat trout exceeding 10 lb (4.5 kg).

== As a symbol ==
The cutthroat trout is the state fish of Idaho, Montana and Wyoming, while particular subspecies of cutthroat are the state fish of Colorado, Nevada, New Mexico and Utah.

- Idaho Montana and Wyoming–Cutthroat trout (O. clarki)
- Colorado–Greenback cutthroat trout (O. v. stomias)
- Nevada–Lahontan cutthroat trout (O. h. henshawi)
- New Mexico–Rio Grande cutthroat trout (O. v. virginalis)
- Utah–Bonneville cutthroat trout (O. v. utah)
