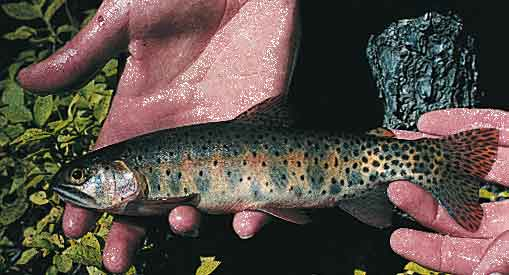

Conservation status
- Critically Imperiled (NatureServe)

- Threatened (ESA)

Scientific classification
- Kingdom: Animalia
- Phylum: Chordata
- Class: Actinopterygii
- Division: Teleostei
- Order: Salmoniformes
- Family: Salmonidae
- Genus: Oncorhynchus
- Species: O. virginalis
- Subspecies: O. v. stomias

Trinomial name
- Oncorhynchus virginalis stomias (Cope, 1871)

= Greenback cutthroat trout =

Subspecies of fish

The greenback cutthroat trout (Oncorhynchus clarkii stomias) is the easternmost subspecies of cutthroat trout. The greenback cutthroat, once widespread in the Arkansas and South Platte River drainages of Eastern Colorado and Southeast Wyoming, today occupies less than 1% of its historical range. It is currently listed as threatened under the Endangered Species Act. It was adopted as the state fish of Colorado on March 15, 1994, replacing the unofficial rainbow trout.

== Description ==
The greenback cutthroat's maximum size is 18 inches (46 cm). It has the largest spots of all cutthroats and is reported to have the most brilliant spawning coloration. Like all cutthroats, it has red coloration in the area of the lower jaw and throat. Historically, it has been reported to grow as large as 4.5 kilograms (9.9 lb).

== Natural history ==
The cutthroat trout is thought to have evolved over the past two million years from other Oncorhynchus species which migrated up the Columbia and Snake river basins to the Green and Yellowstone river basins. Within the past 20,000 years, a population which crossed the Continental Divide during the most recent ice age gave rise to the greenback cutthroat.

There is some controversy about the native range of the greenback cutthroat trout. It has long been thought that the greenback cutthroat was native to the South Platte and Arkansas River basins, likely due to the fact that the only surviving genetically pure population was found in a small creek in the Arkansas River basin. However, recent research has speculated that the greenback cutthroat was only native to the South Platte River basin, while the yellowfin cutthroat trout was native to the Arkansas River basin. Although it was common in the late 19th century, it began to decline when settlers arrived in the area. Mining in its native river basins led to sediment and toxic runoff in the water. These factors, along with water diversion for agriculture and overfishing, led to the decline of many greenback cutthroat trout populations.

The introduction of non-native species such as brook trout (Salvelinus fontinalis), brown trout (Salmo trutta), and rainbow trout (O. mykiss) was also detrimental to the greenback cutthroat. The former two species competed with greenback cutthroats while the latter hybridized with it, creating cutbows. Other subspecies of cutthroat were introduced to greenback habitat, further damaging populations due to hybridization.

== Conservation ==
The species was originally thought to have been recorded in 1857 by William A. Hammond, an Army surgeon accompanying troops west during the early Indian Wars in 1857. As a corresponding member of the Academy of Natural Sciences at Drexel University in Philadelphia, he sent back crates of specimens that he collected back there for eventual identification and study. The crates with the trout specimens were labeled as having come from "the South Platte River at Fort Riley, Kansas". This caused some confusion when the specimens were first examined in the 1870s by Edward Drinker Cope, who first identified them as greenbacks, since the river does not flow through anywhere in Kansas. Two decades later, David Starr Jordan, one of the leading ichthyologists of his day, resolved the apparent impossibility by deciding that Hammond must have collected them on a trip to Fort Bridger, in the Green River basin in southwestern Wyoming, which would have likely taken him along the South Platte.

Although the greenback cutthroat was considered extinct by the 1930s, in 1957 a population was discovered in Rocky Mountain National Park in the Big Thompson River, a tributary of the South Platte. Additional populations were found in 1965 and 1970, making possible the 1978 reclassification of the subspecies as threatened under the 1973 Endangered Species Act. (Note: Oncorhynchus clarki stomias had originally been listed as endangered under the 1966 Endangered Species Prevention Act.) Recovery efforts for the greenback cutthroat by the U.S. Fish and Wildlife Service, assisted by Trout Unlimited, are ongoing. However, it was recently determined that due to insufficient study of the original stock most if not all animals in the reintroduction program were actually the similar Colorado River cutthroat trout. Catch and release fishing of the greenback cutthroat is currently permitted in parts of both the South Platte and Arkansas River basins. The Bozeman National Fish Hatchery was a key player in the recovery of the greenback cutthroat trout.

In 2012, a genetic study that compared DNA samples both from modern populations and historical samples dating back to the 19th century revealed that the only remaining population of pure greenback cutthroat trout is found in a 4-mile (6.4 km) stretch of Bear Creek, a tributary of the Arkansas River. Many of the populations previously identified as greenback cutthroat were actually of the similar Colorado River and Rio Grande cutthroat subspecies.

The study also cleared up the confusion Hammond's labeling had created. His samples were tested and found to have been Rio Grandes rather than greenbacks, likely collected in New Mexico. All the sample crates he shipped had been labeled as being from Fort Riley, where his unit was based, and the South Platte regardless of where the samples within actually originated.

In 2022, Colorado Parks and Wildlife announced that the greenback cutthroat trout was discovered to be naturally reproducing having been reintroduced in Herman Gulch.

== See also ==
- Ecology of the Rocky Mountains
- Yellowfin cutthroat trout
