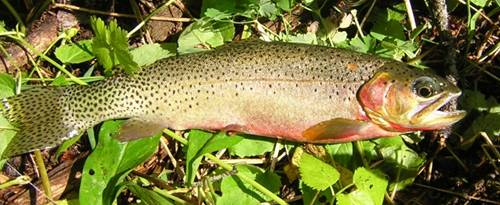

Conservation status
- Apparently Secure (NatureServe)

Scientific classification
- Kingdom: Animalia
- Phylum: Chordata
- Class: Actinopterygii
- Division: Teleostei
- Order: Salmoniformes
- Family: Salmonidae
- Genus: Oncorhynchus
- Species: O. lewisi
- Subspecies: O. l. lewisi

Trinomial name
- Oncorhynchus lewisi lewisi (G. Suckley, 1856)
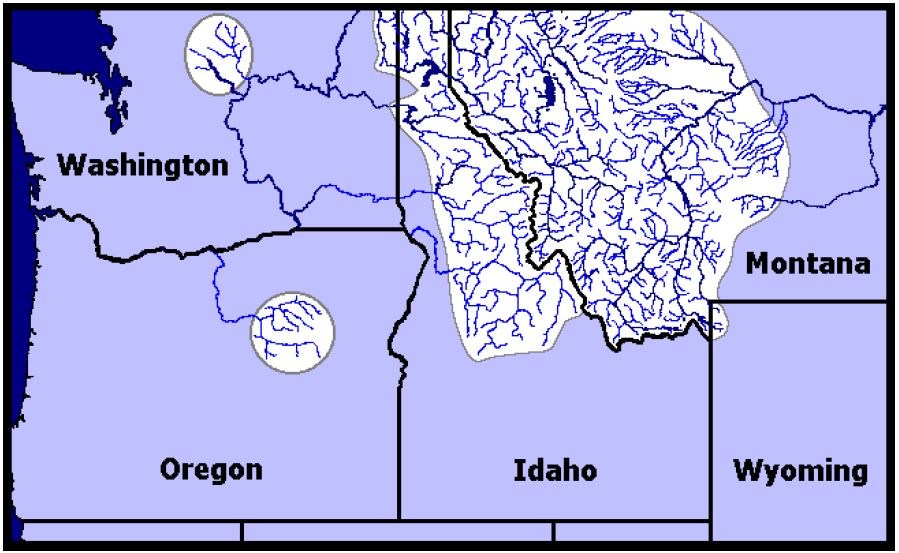
- The historic distribution of westslope cutthroat trout in the United States (modified from Behnke 1992). The large region consists primarily of the upper Columbia River and upper Missouri River basins; some waters in the eastern part of this region may not have been occupied historically (MTFWP, in litt. 1998). Also shown are the Lake Chelan and Methow River drainages in Washington and the John Day River drainage in Oregon.

Synonyms
- Salmo mykiss lewisi (Jordan and Evermann, 1896); Salmo clarkii lewisi (Jordan and Evermann, 1898); Salar lewisi (Suckley, 1856); Salmo clarkii alpestris (Drymond, 1931)

= Westslope cutthroat trout =

Species and nominate of fish

The Westslope cutthroat trout (Oncorhynchus lewisi) is a freshwater salmonid in the cutthroat trout complex. The nominate subspecies, also known as the Missouri River cutthroat trout, is Oncorhynchus lewisi lewisi. The Westslope cutthroat trout is the Montana state fish. The Westslope cutthroat trout is a species of concern in Montana and British Columbia ranges and is considered threatened in its native range in Alberta.

== Taxonomy ==
The scientific name of the Westslope cutthroat trout is Oncorhynchus lewisi, as it was first described in the journals of explorer William Clark from specimens obtained during the Lewis and Clark Expedition from the Missouri River near Great Falls, Montana. Cutthroat trout were given the name Salmo clarki in honor of William Clark, who co-led the expedition of 1804–1806. One of Lewis and Clark's missions was to describe the flora and fauna encountered during the expedition. The type specimen of S. clarki was described by naturalist John Richardson in 1836 from a tributary of the lower Columbia River, identified as the "Katpootl", which was perhaps the Lewis River as there was a Multnomah village of similar name at the confluence. This type specimen was most likely the coastal cutthroat subspecies. In 1853, naturalist George Suckley while working for the Pacific Railroad Survey led by Isaac Stevens collected specimens of Westslope cutthroat trout by fly fishing below the Great Falls on the Missouri River. In 1856, he described the trout as Salar lewisi to honor explorer Meriwether Lewis. In David Starr Jordan and Barton Warren Evermann's A Check-list of the Fishes and Fishlike Vertebrates of North and Middle America (1896), the name Salmo mykiss lewisi was given to Yellowstone trout or cut-throat trout and included a reference to specimens collected from the Missouri River by George Suckley. In 1898, Jordan and Evermann changed the name of cutthroat trout to Salmo clarki. Salmo clarki lewisi persisted as the subspecies name for both the Yellowstone cutthroat and Westslope cutthroat trout until 1971 when fisheries biologist Robert J. Behnke gave the name Salmo clarki bouvieri to the Yellowstone cutthroat with Salmo clarki lewisi reserved for the Westslope cutthroat trout.

In 1989, morphological and genetic studies indicated trout of the Pacific basin were genetically closer to Pacific salmon (Oncorhynchus species) than to the Salmos–brown trout (S. trutta) or Atlantic salmon (S. salar) of the Atlantic basin. Thus, in 1989, taxonomic authorities moved the rainbow, cutthroat and other Pacific basin trout into the genus Oncorhynchus.

This single species (O. clarkii) classification is now changed. Genetic, taxonomic, and geologic studies have determined that cutthroat trout should be divided into four distinct species, with each having multiple subspecies corresponding to the evolutionary lineages found within major river basins, except for the Coastal cutthroat trout.

== Subspecies ==
Common name	Scientific name	Range	Image
Missouri River cutthroat trout	O. lewisi lewisi	Native to the Missouri River drainage from the Judith River upstream to the headwaters. Captain Meriwether Lewis of the Lewis and Clark Expedition described trout caught near the Great Falls of the Missouri River in Montana on June 13th, 1805.	Missouri River cutthroat trout
Neoboreal cutthroat trout	O. lewisi ssp.	Largest native range of all Westslope Cutthroat, and are native to parts of the upper Columbia, Fraser and Saskatchewan watersheds in Washington, Idaho, Montana, British Columbia, and Alberta. Several disjunct populations in British Columbia that were initially classified as a distinct subspecies the Alpine Cutthroat, but based on taxonomic characteristics and genetics these populations clearly align with the Neoboreal Cutthroat.	Neoboreal Cutthroat Trout from the Middle Fork Flathead River
Coeur d’ Alene cutthroat trout	O. lewisi ssp.	Native to the Coeur d’ Alene River drainage in Northern Idaho.	Coeur d’ Alene cutthroat trout
St. Joe cutthroat trout	O. lewisi ssp.	Native the St. Joe watershed of the Idaho panhandle. Neoboreal subspecies inhabit the lower reaches of the Coeur d’Alene and St. Joe watersheds. It remains uncertain what factors distinguish them from the St. Joe Westslope Cutthroat or whether these Neoboreal fish are native to these watersheds.	St. Joe Cutthroat
North Fork Clearwater cutthroat trout	O. lewisi ssp.	Native to the North Fork Clearwater River and its tributaries including Kelly Creek in Idaho.	North Fork Clearwater cutthroat trout
Clearwater Headwater cutthroat trout	O. lewisi ssp.	Restricted to the upper Selway River upstream of Selway Falls and the South Fork Clearwater approximately upstream of the Crooked River. The exact boundary is currently not known.	Clearwater Headwater cutthroat trout
Clearwater-Eastern Cascades cutthroat trout	O. lewisi ssp.	Native to the mainstem Clearwater River, Locsha, and lower Selway Rivers in Idaho, as well as the Eastern Cascade Mountains from the Methow River to the Yakima River in Washington State.	Clearwater-Eastern Cascades cutthroat trout
Salmon River cutthroat trout	O. lewisi ssp.	Native to the Salmon River watershed in central Idaho.	Clearwater-Eastern Cascades cutthroat trout
John Day cutthroat trout	O. lewisi ssp.	Native to about 220 miles (355 km) of 41 tributaries to the John Day River watershed in Oregon. Has the smallest and southern-most range of all Westslope Cutthroat.	John Day cutthroat trout

== Description ==
The fish has teeth under its tongue, on the roof of the mouth, and in the front of the mouth. Westslope cutthroat are common in both headwaters lake and stream environments. Like most other cutthroat trout, they are opportunistic feeders with diverse diets, and as their size increases, so does their food. Some of their primary forage, frequently imitated by fly fishers, include macroinvertebrates such as caddisflies, stoneflies, mayflies and aquatic dipterans (including midges and craneflies) in adult, larval, and pupal stages. They will also prey on ants, beetles, spiders, grasshoppers and crickets, and aquatic items including crayfish, freshwater molluscs, fish eggs, shrimp and other crustaceans, and other fish. Generally, they adjust their diet and feeding behavior due to factors such as food availability, habitat, age, and size. The average length of the fish is about 12–15 inches (300-400 mm) and rarely exceeds 18 inches (46 cm). The skin has small dark freckle-like spots clustered towards the tail, and is mostly orange-hued. They can be distinguished from rainbow trout by the red, pink, or orange marking beneath the jaw (hence the name "cutthroat").

== Range ==
A rangemap of Westslope cutthroat subspecies.

Westslope cutthroat trout are native in northern Idaho's and British Columbia's upper Columbia River system and northern tributaries of the Snake River, but not the Snake River's main stem to the south. East of the Continental Divide in Alberta and Montana, Westslope cutthroat trout are native to the upper Missouri, Milk and North Saskatchewan rivers, but not the Yellowstone River to the south. In Montana, the historic range extended east to the mouth of the Judith River and south into the Madison, Gallatin and Jefferson river systems. Isolated populations of Westslope cutthroat trout exist in upper tributaries of the John Day River in the Strawberry Mountains of Oregon and Columbia River tributaries along the eastern side of the Cascade Range in Washington. Isolated populations exist in the Fraser River basin in British Columbia. Existing populations of genetically pure Westslope cutthroat trout exist in less than three percent of its historic range.

== Life cycle ==
Westslope cutthroat trout reflect three life strategies—adfluvial, fluvial, or stream resident. Adfluvial fish live in the large lakes in the upper Columbia River drainage and spawn in lake tributaries. Fluvial fish live in medium to large rivers but migrate to tributaries for spawning. Most adults return to the river or lake after spawning. Stream resident fish complete their entire life in tributaries. All three forms occur in most basins.

== Conservation ==
Genetically pure Westslope cutthroat trout have been extirpated throughout most of their historic range due to habitat loss and introduction of non-native species. Remaining populations survive in isolated populations, mostly in headwater streams above natural downstream barriers. The introduction of rainbow and brown trout into Missouri River tributaries eliminated the Westslope cutthroat trout from most of its eastern range in Montana. Introductions of non-native kokanee salmon (Oncorhynchus nerka), lake trout (Salvelinus namaycush) and lake whitefish (Coregonus clupeaformis) into Flathead Lake and the Flathead River system caused drastic declines in Westslope cutthroat trout populations. Existing populations are in imminent danger from land-use activities and hybridization with introduced rainbow trout (resulting in cutbows) and Yellowstone cutthroat trout. Even the strongest populations in Glacier National Park and the Flathead Basin of Montana are in serious decline. Reasons for the critical condition of the subspecies include habitat destruction from logging, road building, grazing, mining, urban development, agriculture and dams, introduction of non-native hatchery strains, competition and hybridization from introduced non-native fish species.
