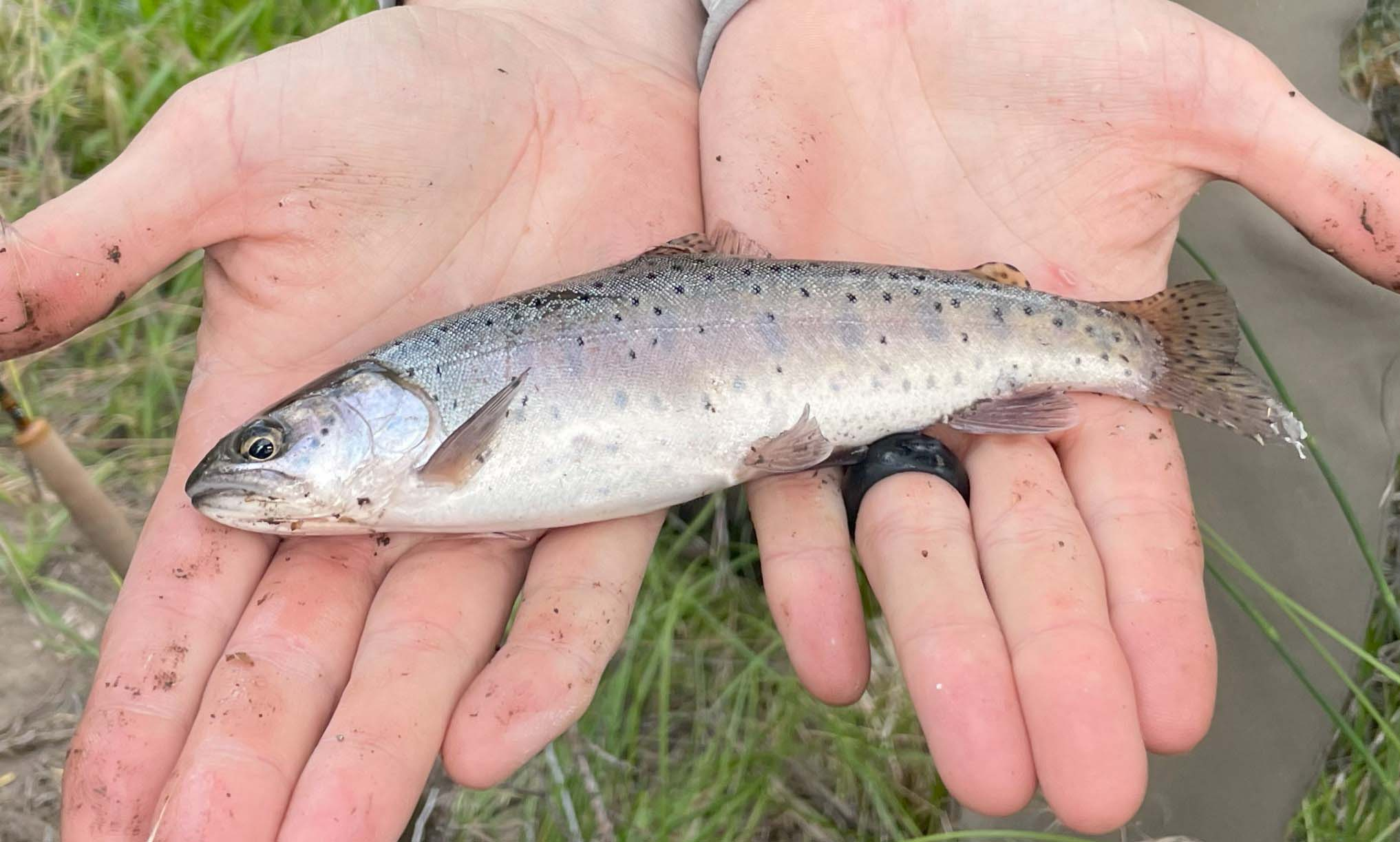

Scientific classification
- Kingdom: Animalia
- Phylum: Chordata
- Class: Actinopterygii
- Division: Teleostei
- Order: Salmoniformes
- Family: Salmonidae
- Genus: Oncorhynchus
- Species: O. clarkii
- Population: Willow-Whitehorse Basin cutthroat trout

= Whitehorse Basin cutthroat trout =

Willow-Whitehorse Basin cutthroat trout

Subspecies of fish

The Willow-Whitehorse Basin cutthroat trout refers to a population segment of the cutthroat trout complex, specifically the Lahontan cutthroat trout (Oncorhynchus henshawii), from the streams of the Whitehorse Basin (or the Coyote Basin), southeastern Oregon. These fish have adapted to live under extreme conditions, and can withstand water temperatures as high as 85 °F for short periods of time.
