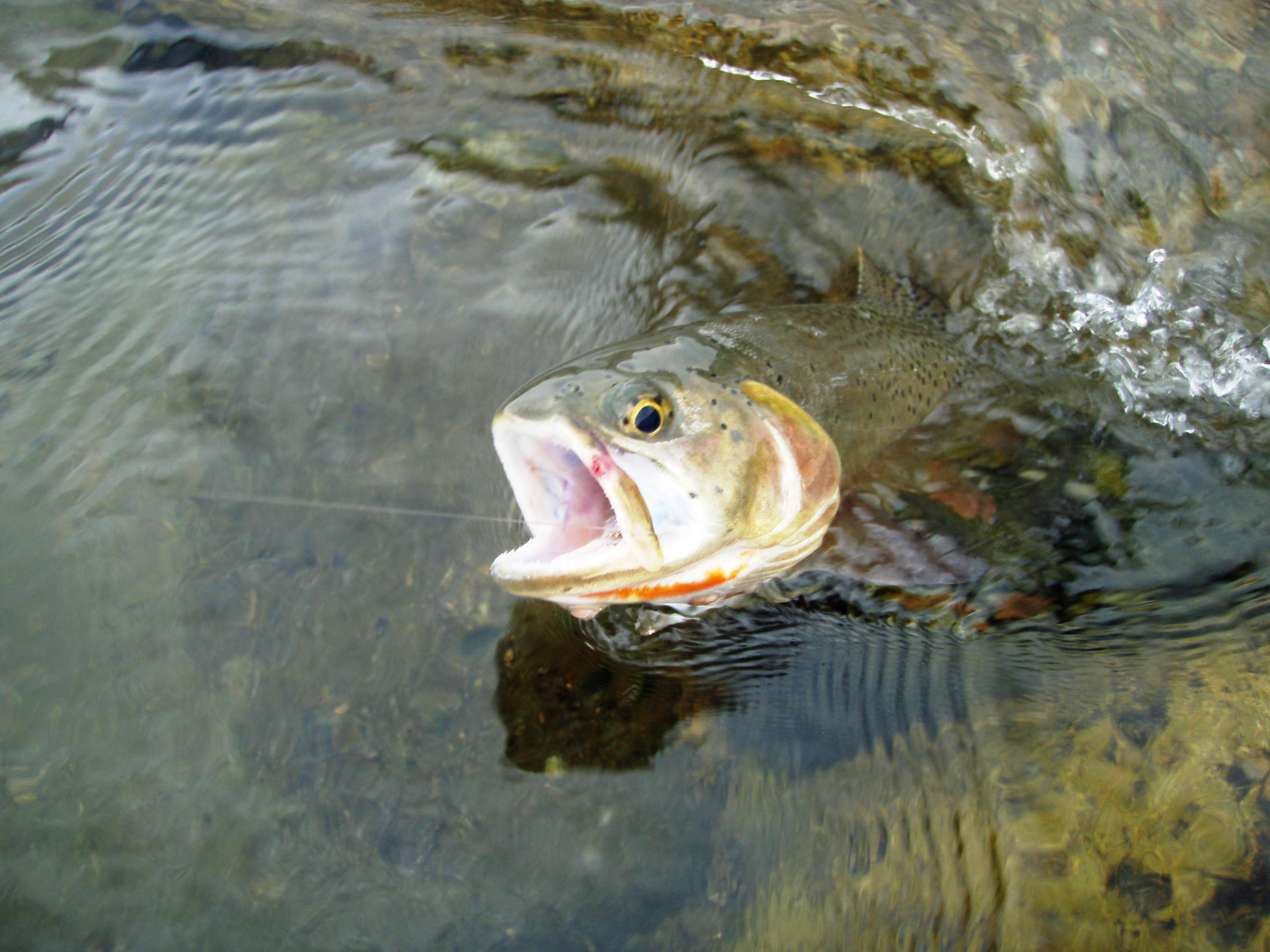

Scientific classification
- Kingdom: Animalia
- Phylum: Chordata
- Class: Actinopterygii
- Order: Salmoniformes
- Family: Salmonidae
- Subfamily: Salmoninae
- Genus: Oncorhynchus
- Species: O. mykiss × O. clarkii

= Cutbow =

Hybrid fish

The cutbow (Oncorhynchus sp. × mykiss) is an interspecific fertile hybrid between rainbow trout (Oncorhynchus mykiss) and cutthroat trout (Oncorhynchus sp.). Based on currently accepted taxonomy, four species-specific hybrid names are recognized for cutbow:

- Coastal cutthroat trout × rainbow trout (Oncorhynchus clarkii × mykiss), or coastal cutbow
- Westslope cutthroat trout × rainbow trout (Oncorhynchus lewisi × mykiss), or westlope cutbow
- Lahontan cutthroat trout × rainbow trout (Oncorhynchus henshawii × mykiss), or Lahontan cutbow
- Rocky Mountain cutthroat trout × rainbow trout (Oncorhynchus virginalis × mykiss), or Rocky Mountain cutbow

Of these four species-specific hybrids, only coastal and westslope cutbow have natural range overlap; Lahontan and Rocky Mountain cutbow are the result of rainbow trout stocking and invasion. Due to these introductions, many populations of cutthroat trout are at risk of genetic pollution. Significant management intervention at state and federal levels has occurred to preserve native populations of cutthroat trout.

== History ==
Cutbow can occur naturally where the native ranges of both parent species overlap, such as between coastal rainbow trout (O. mykiss irideus) and coastal cutthroat trout (O. clarkii) and between Columbia River redband trout (O. mykiss gardineri) and westslope cutthroat trout (O. lewisi). However, stocking of nonnative rainbow trout in watersheds that contained cutthroat trout throughout the 19th and 20th centuries increased the occurrence of cutbow in North America. Increased hybridization imperiled or extirpated many populations of cutthroat trout, and hybridization was recognized as problematic by early North American ichthyologists and fishery scientists.

== Description ==
Like most fish hybrids, cutbow are difficult to identify based on external characteristics alone. This is further complicated by phenotypic variation of cutthroat trout across their range. Subsequently, many anglers confuse cutbow with rainbow or cutthroat trout. Cutbow generally have a reddish or orange slash under the jaw like cutthroat trout, but the slash is usually fainter than would be expected in a pure cutthroat trout. In some populations such as Yellowstone cutthroat trout (Oncorhynchus virginalis bouvierii), a white leading edge on the anal or dorsal fin suggests hybridization with rainbow trout. In crosses between coastal cutthroat trout and rainbow trout, the presence of hyoid teeth and jaw slash intensity can be useful external traits to identify potential hybridization.

== Reproduction ==
In a hatchery setting, cutbow are created when the female cutthroat trout's eggs are fertilized by a male rainbow trout. Spawning cutthroat trout may experience prolonged spatial and temporal overlap with spawning rainbow trout, thus increasing the likelihood for hybridization.

== Management ==
In many instances, wild (non-stocked) cutbow trout are considered a threat to the persistence of wild cutthroat trout and are managed similarly to invasive fishes. For example, some programs focus on targeted removal of cutbow. In other locations where introgression with wild cutthroat trout not an immediate threat, cutbow are stocked to establish a fishery.
