= Robert J. Behnke =

American fisheries biologist

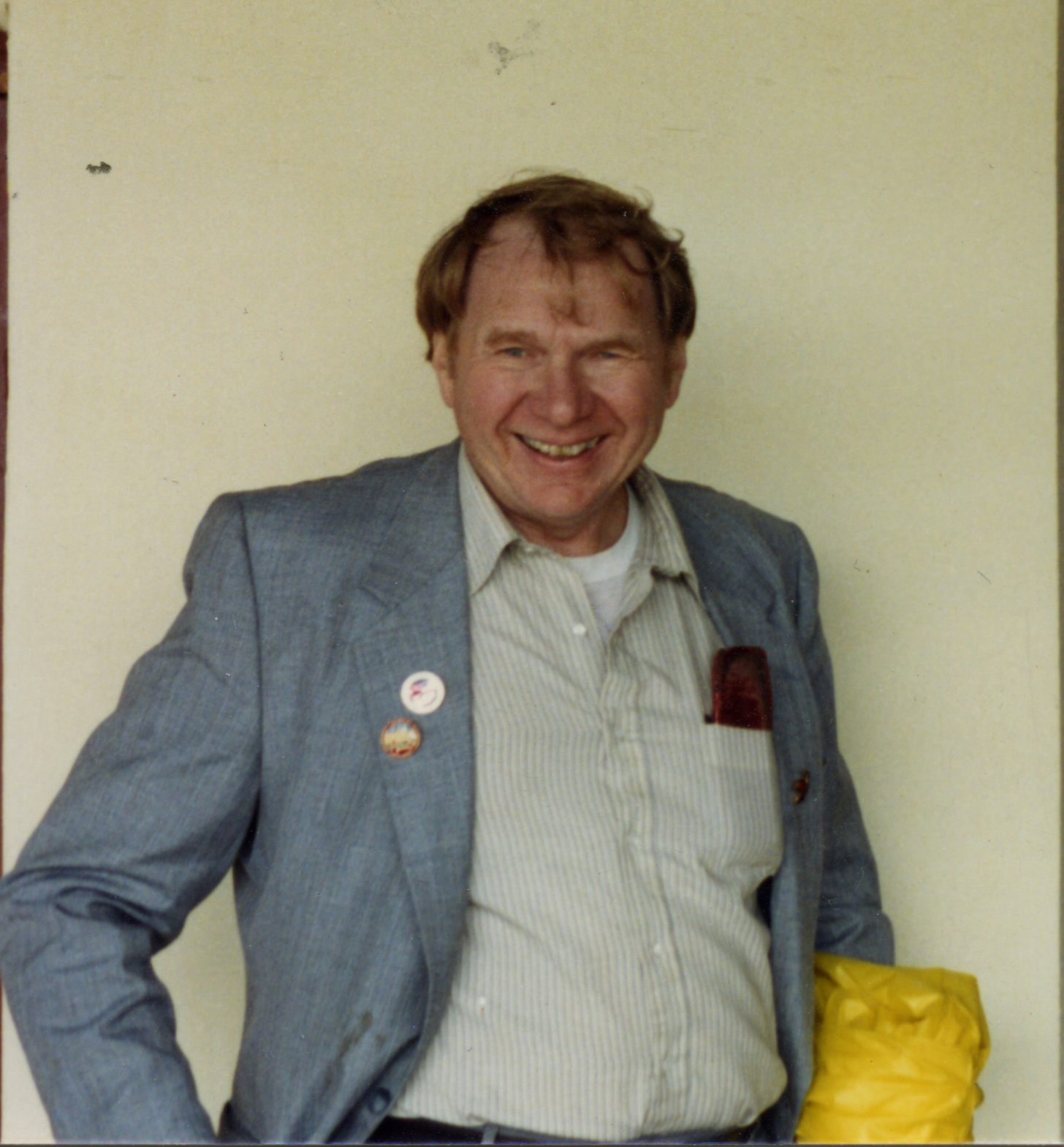
- Born: December 30, 1929; Stamford, Connecticut
- Died: September 13, 2013 (aged 83); Fort Collins, Colorado
- Other names: Dr. Trout, The Trout Doctor
- Education: University of Connecticut, University of California, Berkeley
- Spouse: Sally Martin
- Scientific career
- Fields: Fisheries Biologist, Conservationist
- Workplaces: U.S. Fish and Wildlife Service, Colorado State University
- Doctoral advisor: A. Starker Leopold
- Other academic advisors: Paul R. Needham

Dr. Robert J. Behnke (December 30, 1929 – September 13, 2013) was an American fisheries biologist and conservationist who was recognized as a world authority on the classification of salmonid fishes. He was popularly known as "Dr. Trout" or "The Trout Doctor". His seminal work, Trout and Salmon of North America, was published in 2002. He wrote a regular column for Trout Magazine, the quarterly publication of Trout Unlimited. He was a fisheries biologist with the U.S. Fish and Wildlife Service in the Colorado Cooperative Fish and Wildlife Research Unit and a professor at Colorado State University in the 1970s. He became a Professor Emeritus at the Department of Fishery and Wildlife Biology at Colorado State University.

== Early life ==
Robert J. Behnke was born in Stamford, Connecticut, on December 30, 1929. He lived in Connecticut until 1952 when he was drafted into the U.S. Army, serving in the Korean War in both Korea and Japan. Upon leaving the military in 1954, Behnke attended the University of Connecticut and earned a Bachelor's degree in zoology, graduating with honors in 1957. He earned Master’s and Doctorate degrees in ichthyology from the University of California Berkeley, where he studied under noted conservationist Starker Leopold. He married Sally Martin in 1963 and moved to Fort Collins, Colorado, in 1966 to work for the U.S. Fish and Wildlife Service in the Colorado Cooperative Fish and Wildlife Research Unit.

== Major contributions ==
Behnke was considered a classic taxonomist but also an avid angler, fisheries historian and conservationist. During his career he authored more than 100 articles and papers regarding fish and fisheries. He is credited with helping re-discover two native trout subspecies previously believed extinct—the Pyramid Lake strain of the Lahontan cutthroat trout and the Greenback cutthroat trout, the state fish of Colorado.

Dr. Behnke was an advocate of native trout restoration throughout western North America, and inspired anglers conservationists to value the uniqueness of native trout through his columns for Trout Unlimited. In 2002, Colorado Trout Unlimited recognized him with its 2002 Trout Communications Award for years of work in translating the intricacies of fisheries science for a mass audience.

Dr. Behnke is also widely credited with influencing generations of fish biologists and conservationists while serving on faculty at Colorado State University.

== Legacy ==
In 2006, Dr. Behnke donated over 60 boxes of personal papers and project research to the Bud Lilly Trout and Salmonid Collection at the Merrill G. Burlingame Special Collections Library of Montana State University Library in Bozeman, Montana. His personal collection of preserved specimens was donated to Brigham Young University. In 2011, Colorado State University created the Robert J. Behnke Endowed Chair In Coldwater Conservation to honor Dr. Behnke for his 30 years of service to the university. In January 2003, Fly, Rod and Reel magazine, named Dr. Behnke "Angler of the Year". In 2007, Dr. Behnke along with others endowed the "Robert J. Behnke – Rocky Mountain Flycasters Research Fellowship" to provide opportunities for Colorado State University graduate students to study fisheries related to the restoration of native greenback cutthroat trout in Colorado. In 1995, a new sub-species of cutthroat trout, the Snake River fine-spotted cutthroat trout (Oncorhynchus clarkii behnkei), was named to honor Dr. Behnke's fisheries work.

== Significant publications ==
Dr. Behnke's seminal work, Trout and Salmon of North America, was published in 2002. Behnke contributed a regular column to Trout Magazine, the journal of Trout Unlimited for over 25 years. A significant number of those columns are contained in The Best of Robert J. Behnke from Trout Magazine. He also published hundreds of scientific articles in journals related to fisheries biology and conservation.

- Behnke, Robert J. "The 2005 Coastal Cutthroat Trout Symposium-Key Note Abstract-Some Food for Thought Concerning Coastal Cutthroat Trout" (PDF). Oregon Chapter American Fisheries Society. p. 157.
- Robert J. Behnke (2007). About Trout: The Best of Robert J. Behnke from Trout Magazine. Lyons Press. ISBN 9781599212036.
- Behnke, Robert J.; Tomelleri, Joseph (2002). Trout and Salmon of North America. Free Press. ISBN 0743222202.
- Behnke, R. J. (1997). J.D.Hall; P.A. Bisson; R.E. Gresswell (eds.). "Evolution, systematics, and structure of Oncorhynchus clarki clarki. Pages 3–7". Sea-run Cutthroat Trout: Biology, Management, and Future Conservation. Corvallis, Oregon: Oregon Chapter, American Fisheries Society.
- Behnke, R. J. (1992). "Native trout of western North America". American Fisheries Society Monograph. 6. Bethesda, Maryland: American Fisheries Society.
