= American Fisheries Society =

The American Fisheries Society (established 1870 in New York City), is the "world’s oldest and largest organization dedicated to strengthening the fisheries profession, advancing fisheries science, and conserving fisheries resources." It is a member-driven 501(c)(3) nonprofit organization governed by an executive director, a governing board, and officers who are guided by the AFS's organizational documents, a constitution, and a set of rules. Their stated mission is "to improve the conservation and sustainability of fishery resources and aquatic ecosystems by advancing fisheries and aquatic science and promoting the development of fisheries professionals." AFS publishes five peer-reviewed fish journals, books, and the magazine Fisheries, organizes seminars and workshops that promote scientific research and fisheries management, and encourages fisheries education through 58 university-based student subunits. AFS has 48 chapters comprising four geographic regions in North America — North Central, Northeastern, Southern, and Western — and includes two "bi-national" chapters (the Atlantic International and Washington-British Columbia chapters) and a Mexico chapter.

== Publications ==
=== Journals ===
AFS publishes five peer-reviewed journals, as well as Fisheries Magazine. The journals have previously been published with Wiley, but are now published by Oxford University Press. The journals include:

- Transactions of the American Fisheries Society - features papers on basic fisheries science;
- North American Journal of Fisheries Management - covers research, experiences and recommendations regarding fisheries management;
- North American Journal of Aquaculture - coverage of breeding and raising aquatic animals;
- Journal of Aquatic Animal Health - coverage relating to fisheries health maintenance and the treatment of diseases;
- Marine and Coastal Fisheries - covers marine, coastal, and estuarine fisheries.
- Fisheries - the monthly magazine of the American Fisheries Society. Covers a blend of peer‑reviewed technical articles and magazine content that highlights new ideas, emerging issues, and the people and practices shaping aquatic resource science and management.

=== Books ===
By the end of 2023, AFS had published 185 books. A limited selection of titles follows:

- Neil Fisher, Patrice LeBlanc, C. Alwyn Rose, and Barry Sadler, editors (June 2015). "Managing the Impacts of Human Activities on Fish Habitat: The Governance, Practices, and Science". American Fisheries Society, pages=264. ISBN 978-1-934874-41-7
- Michael C. Quist, Daniel A. Isermann, editors (November 2017). "Age and Growth of Fishes: Principles and Techniques". American Fisheries Society, pages=359. ISBN 978-1-934874-48-6
- Lawrence M. Page, Héctor Espinosa-Pérez, Lloyd T. Findley, Carter R. Gilbert, Robert N. Lea, Nicholas E. Mandrak, Richard L. Mayden, and Joseph S. Nelson (April 2013) Common and Scientific Names of Fishes from the United States, Canada, and Mexico, 7th edition. American Fisheries Society, pages=243. ISBN 978-1-934874-31-8
