= Schnabel =

Schnabel is a German surname meaning "beak". Notable people with the surname include:

- Arthur Schnabel (1948–2018), German judoka
- Artur Schnabel (1882–1951), Polish-Austrian classical pianist and composer, husband of Therese Schnabel
- Charles Schnabel (1895–1974), American agricultural chemist
- Enrico Schnabel (born 1974), German rower
- Ernst Schnabel (1913–1986), German writer
- Isabel Schnabel (born 1971), German economist, board member of the European Central Bank
- Johann Gottfried Schnabel (1692–1751/8), German author
- Julian Schnabel (born 1951), American painter and filmmaker
  - Stella Schnabel (born 1983), daughter of Julian, American actress and producer
  - Vito Schnabel (born 1986), son of Julian, American art dealer, actor, writer and producer
  - Lola Schnabel, daughter of Julian, American artist
- Karl Ulrich Schnabel (1909–2001), German classical pianist, son of Artur and Therese Schnabel
- Parker Schnabel (born c. 1994), American gold miner and cast member of the Discovery Channel series Gold Rush
- Paul Schnabel (born 1948), Dutch sociologist
- Robert Schnabel (ice hockey) (born 1978), Czech-born professional ice hockey defenseman
- Robert B. Schnabel (born 1950), American computer scientist
- Rockwell A. Schnabel (born 1936), American businessman and diplomat
- Stefan Schnabel (1912–1999), German actor, son of Artur and Therese Schnabel
- Therese Schnabel (1876–1959), German contralto, spouse of Artur Schnabel

== See also ==
- Schnabel car, a specialized type of railroad freight car
- Plague doctor, "Doktor Schnabel von Rom"
- O. P. Schnabel Park, a City Park in San Antonio, Texas
- Schnabl (surname)
