= Pine–oak forest =

Forest ecosystems of oak and pine trees

Pine–oak forest, pine–oak woodland, or oak–pine forest is a group of similar of ecosystems, primarily found in North and Central America. These areas are dominated by pine and oak trees. Under the Forest-Range Environmental Study Ecosystems classification these are denoted as FRES 14. FRES14 includes the Kuchler system forest types of cedar–hemlock–Douglas-fir forest (K-2), Douglas-fir forest (K-11), California mixed evergreen forest (K-25), and Mosaic of cedar-hemlock-douglas-fir forest and Oregon oakwoods (K-24).

A pine–oak forest can be a stage in ecological succession between pine forests and oak forests. It can also be a long-term stable stage.

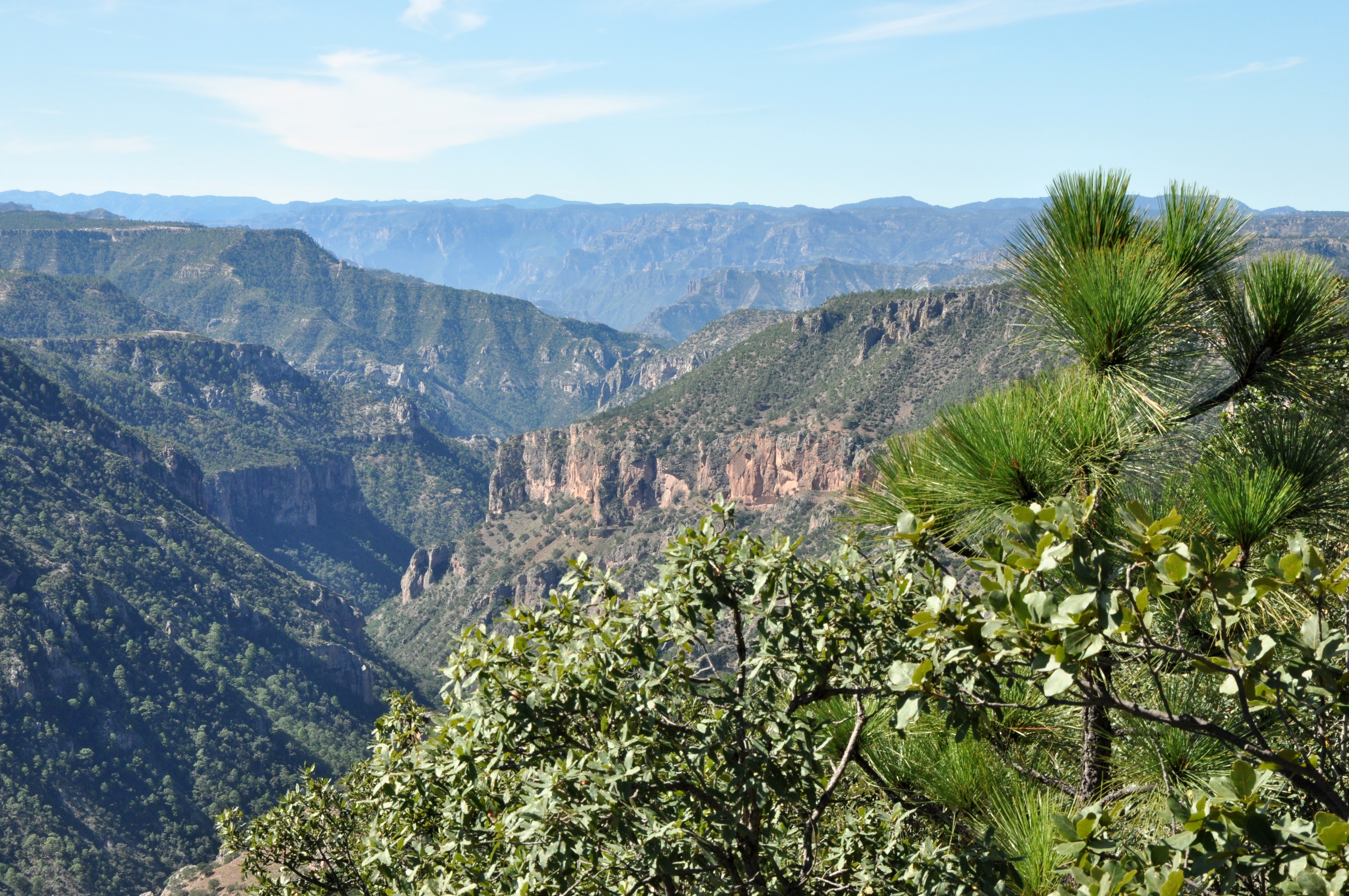
Sierra Madre Occidental pine–oak forest in Mexico, looking across Río San Ignacio from near the village of Guajurana.

Examples include:

- Central American pine–oak forests
- Central Appalachian dry oak–pine forest
- Central Appalachian pine–oak rocky woodland
- Madrean pine–oak woodlands
- Mesoamerican pine–oak forests
- Pine-oak Forests, Puebla
- Sierra Juárez and San Pedro Mártir pine–oak forests
- Sierra Madre Occidental pine–oak forests
- Sierra Madre Oriental pine–oak forests
- Sierra Madre de Oaxaca pine–oak forests
- Sierra Madre del Sur pine–oak forests
- Sierra de la Laguna pine–oak forests
- Trans-Mexican Volcanic Belt pine–oak forests

== See also ==
- Pine-oak plantations, a botanical natural monument in Kyiv Oblast, Ukraine
- Cronartium quercuum, the pine-oak gall rust
- Rhadinaea taeniata, the pine-oak snake
- Rhadinella lachrymans, the tearful pine-oak snake
- Clay Pit Ponds State Park Preserve, formerly called Pine Oak Woods
  - Protectors of Pine Oak Woods, the organization protecting the above preserve
- SW 6th & Pine and SW 5th & Oak stations
