= Naoco Wowsugi =

Japanese-Korean artist

- Born: Japan
- Education: Virginia Commonwealth University
- Website: wowsugi.com

Naoco Wowsugi is a Japanese-born Korean conceptual artist based in the United States whose work has included photography, installation art, and performance art. Much of her art involves interactive elements, and explores themes of community and human connection to food, plants, and fungi.

== Early life and education ==
Wowsugi was born in Japan. Her Korean great-grandparents were brought to Japan as laborers; her grandparents and parents continued to live in Japan, but were not able to become citizens.

In 2001, Wowsugi emigrated to the United States and began attending the Kansas City Art Institute. She then pursued a masters degree in photography at Virginia Commonwealth University, graduating in 2011.

== Career ==
Wowsugi has taught at Virginia Commonwealth University and American University. In 2024, she received American University's Green Teacher of the Year Award.

Since 2012, Wowsugi has been undertaking the performance piece "None of Your Business", in which she makes surreptitious improvements to community spaces she visits. Such improvements included slowly installing artwork at a local bakery, leaving small cowbells at businesses without someone at the counter, and bringing a mug to a coffee shop to act as a straw holder.

In 2015, Wowsugi exhibited at Hamiltonian Gallery in Washington, D.C.; the exhibit comprised pieces created by her students to wish her a happy birthday.

Since 2018, Wowsugi has hosted the Very Sad Lab with Valerie Wiseman at Halcyon Arts Lab. The project explores "healing between plants and their owners". As part of the project, Wowsugi and Wiseman established a pollinator garden on the rooftop of the Eaton Hotel.

In 2019, Wowsugi became a Humanities Truck Fellow, awarded by American University. The fellowship allows artists to use a truck to create a piece or project. Wowsugi originally wanted to use her fellowship to undertake a group portrait project in D.C., but shifted gears after the COVID-19 pandemic placed restrictions on in-person gatherings. Instead, she used the truck as a way to deliver food, first "to communities around the city" and then to Black Lives Matter protests later in 2020.

=== Group portraits ===
Wowsugi's first group portraits took place in 2010 and 2011 in Richmond, Virginia. She took photos of groups of people who were connected in some way, such as a shared employer, subculture, or religious community. The first portrait was of people in the Virginia Commonwealth University Graduate Photography and Film Department, where Wowsugi was studying.

Since 2011, Wowsugi has taken attendance for the classes she teaches by taking a group photo of her students.

In 2015, Wowsugi created Group Portrait Journey in Rockville, Maryland, a photography exhibit showcasing the relationships of individuals who support the VisArts center in Rockville, Maryland.

=== Thank You for Teaching Me English ===
In 2013, Wowsugi began her photography project, Thank You for Teaching Me English. The project includes 30 portraits, each depicting a person from Wowsugi's life who helped her acclimate to life in the United States, as they speak a word they taught her. The exhibit was first shown in late 2013 at the American University Museum. In 2014, the exhibit was shown at Hamiltonian Gallery.

In 2016, the exhibition was a finalist in the National Portrait Gallery's The Outwin contest.

=== "Permacounterculture" ===
In 2016, Wowsugi first presented the installation piece Permacounterculture at Hamiltonian Gallery in Washington, D.C. The piece comprised a white cube-shaped structure, which functioned as both a greenhouse and a music venue. Over the course of the gallery run, wheatgrass was grown in the cube, as recordings of punk music played or as local hardcore musicians performed live at the gallery. Staffers then processed the wheatgrass into shots for gallery attendees and the performers.

=== Fungus Among Us ===
In 2019, Wowsugi worked with Enough Pie, a non-profit in Charleston, South Carolina, to organize the "Fungus Among Us" exhibition at Redux Contemporary Art Center. The exhibition included pieces made by local artists and community members, including students, and interactive elements, such as a map of polaroid photos which visitors could contribute to.

== Personal life ==
After moving to the U.S., Wowsugi has sometimes gone by the name Amber Wolf, after hearing her Japanese name be "butchered". She moved to Washington, D.C., in 2013.
