= Forest-Range Environmental Study Ecosystems =

Ecosystem classification system

Forest-Range Environmental Study Ecosystems, known as FRES, is a system for the classification of ecosystems developed by the United States Forest Service as a management tool for the entire lower 48. Thirty four ecosystems were defined for grasslands, forests, and woodlands.

== Forest and woodland classification ==
- FRES 10 White pine – red pine – jack pine
- FRES 11 Spruce – fir
- FRES 12 Longleaf – slash pine
- FRES 13 Loblolly – shortleaf pine
- FRES 14 Oak pine
- FRES 15 Oak – hickory
- FRES 16 Oak – gum – cypress
- FRES 17 Elm – ash – cottonwood
- FRES 18 Maple – beech – birch
- FRES 19 Aspen – birch
- FRES 20 Douglas-fir
- FRES 21 Ponderosa pine
- FRES 22 Western white pine
- FRES 23 Fir – spruce
- FRES 24 Hemlock – Sitka spruce
- FRES 25 Larch
- FRES 26 Lodgepole pine
- FRES 27 Redwood
- FRES 28 Western hardwoods
- FRES 29 Sagebrush
- FRES 30 Desert shrub
- FRES 31 Shinnery
- FRES 32 Texas savanna
- FRES 33 Southwestern shrubsteppe
- FRES 34 Chaparral – mountain shrub
- FRES 35 Pinyon – juniper

== Grassland classification ==
- FRES 36 Mountain grasslands
- FRES 37 Mountain meadows
- FRES 38 Plains grasslands
- FRES 39 Prairie
- FRES 40 Desert grasslands
- FRES 41 Wet grasslands
- FRES 42 Annual grasslands

== Alpine classification ==
- FRES 44 Alpine meadows and barren
