= Schnabl =

Schnabl, a German family name, can refer to:

- Ana Schnabl (born 1985), Slovenian journalist
- Johann Andreas Schnabl (1838–1912), Polish-German entomologist
- Johann Nepomuk Schnabl (1853–1899), German schoolteacher and mycologist
- Karl Schnabl (born 1954), Austrian ski jumper
- Katja Sturm-Schnabl (born 1936), Austrian literary scholar, cultural historian, linguist and slavicist
- Siegfried Schnabl (1927–2015), German sexologist

== See also ==
- Schnabel (surname)
