= Cedar hemlock douglas-fir forest =

Forest type

Geography
- Location: California, United States

Ecology
- Ecosystem: Temperate coniferous forest
- EPA Classification: FRES20 (Forest-Range Environmental Study Ecosystems)
- CEC Classification: K-2 (Kuchler system)
- Dominant tree species: Incense cedar, Western Hemlock, Douglas fir
- Lesser flora: Toyon, Western poison oak

Cedar hemlock douglas-fir forest is a vegetation association in California, United States. This is one of the Kuchler system forest types used to classify California plant communities. As the name implies, dominant tree types are Incense cedar, Western Hemlock and Douglas fir. The forest type is classified as part of FRES20 in the Forest-Range Environmental Study Ecosystems classification, and K-2 Kuchler system. Understory flora associates include Toyon and Western poison oak.

== See also ==
- California oak woodland
- Mixed conifer forest
