= Ecology of the Rocky Mountains =

Ecology of the Rocky Mountain range in North America

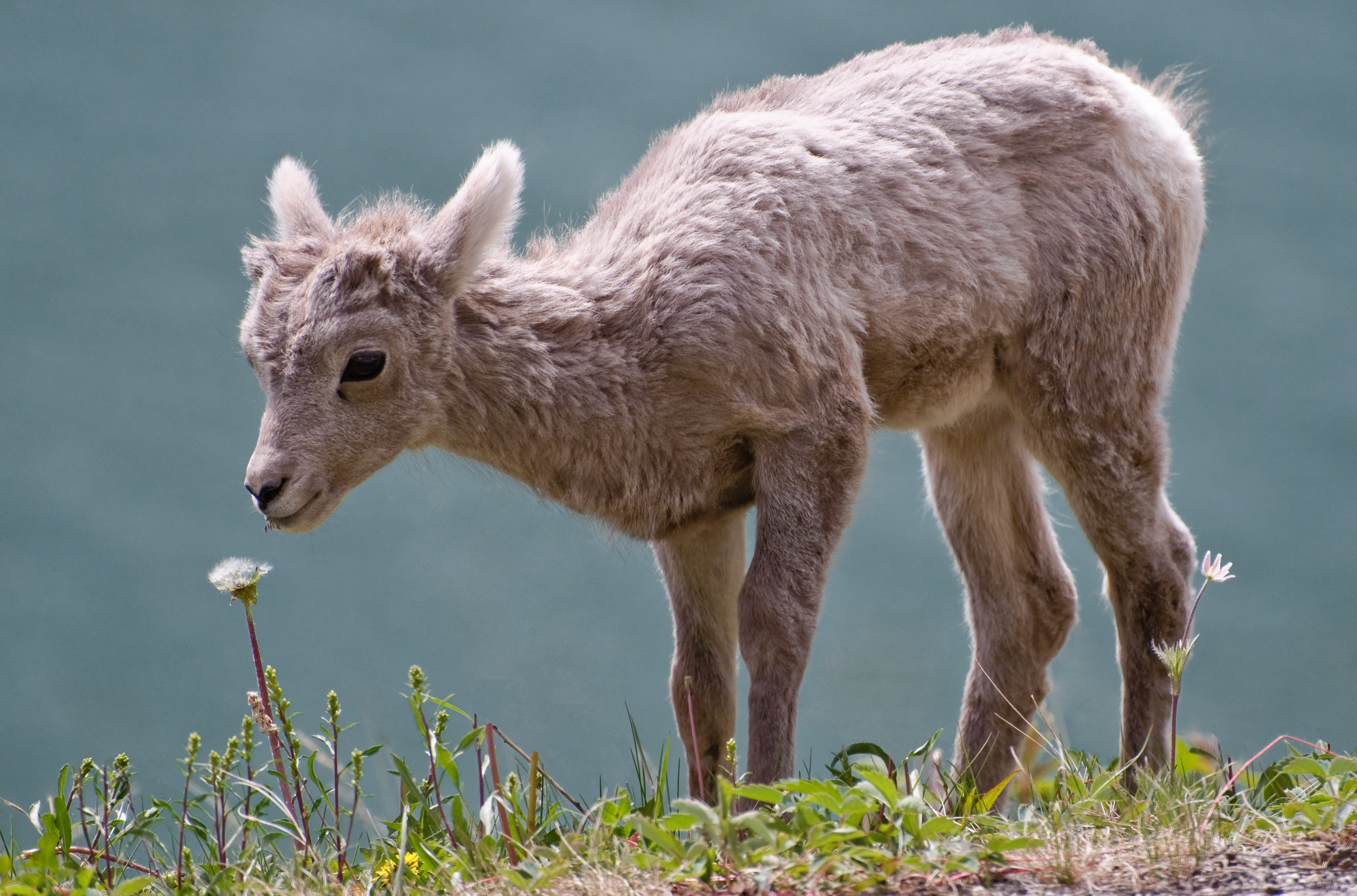
Bighorn sheep (such as this lamb) have declined dramatically since European-American settlement of the Rocky Mountains.

The ecology of the Rocky Mountains is diverse due to the effects of a variety of environmental factors. The Rocky Mountains are the major mountain range in western North America, running from the far north of British Columbia in Canada to New Mexico in the southwestern United States, climbing from the Great Plains at or below 1,800 feet (550 m) to peaks of over 14,000 feet (4,300 m). Temperature and rainfall varies greatly also and thus the Rockies are home to a mixture of habitats including the alpine, subalpine and boreal habitats of the Northern Rocky Mountains in British Columbia and Alberta, the coniferous forests of Montana and Idaho, the wetlands and prairie where the Rockies meet the plains, a different mix of conifers on the Yellowstone Plateau in Wyoming, the montane forests of Utah, and in the high Rockies of Colorado and New Mexico, and finally the alpine tundra of the highest elevations.

These habitats are home to a great deal of wildlife from herbivores, such as elk, moose, mule deer, mountain goat and bighorn sheep, to predators like cougar, Canada lynx, bobcat, black bear, grizzly bear, gray wolf, coyote, fox, and wolverine, along with a great variety of small mammals, fish, reptiles and amphibians, numerous bird species, and tens of thousands of species of terrestrial and aquatic invertebrates and soil organisms.

Permanent human settlement of the Rocky Mountains has caused numerous species to decline in population, including species of trout, birds, and sheep. Gray wolves and grizzly bears were almost eliminated from the United States portion of the range, but are returning due to conservation measures.

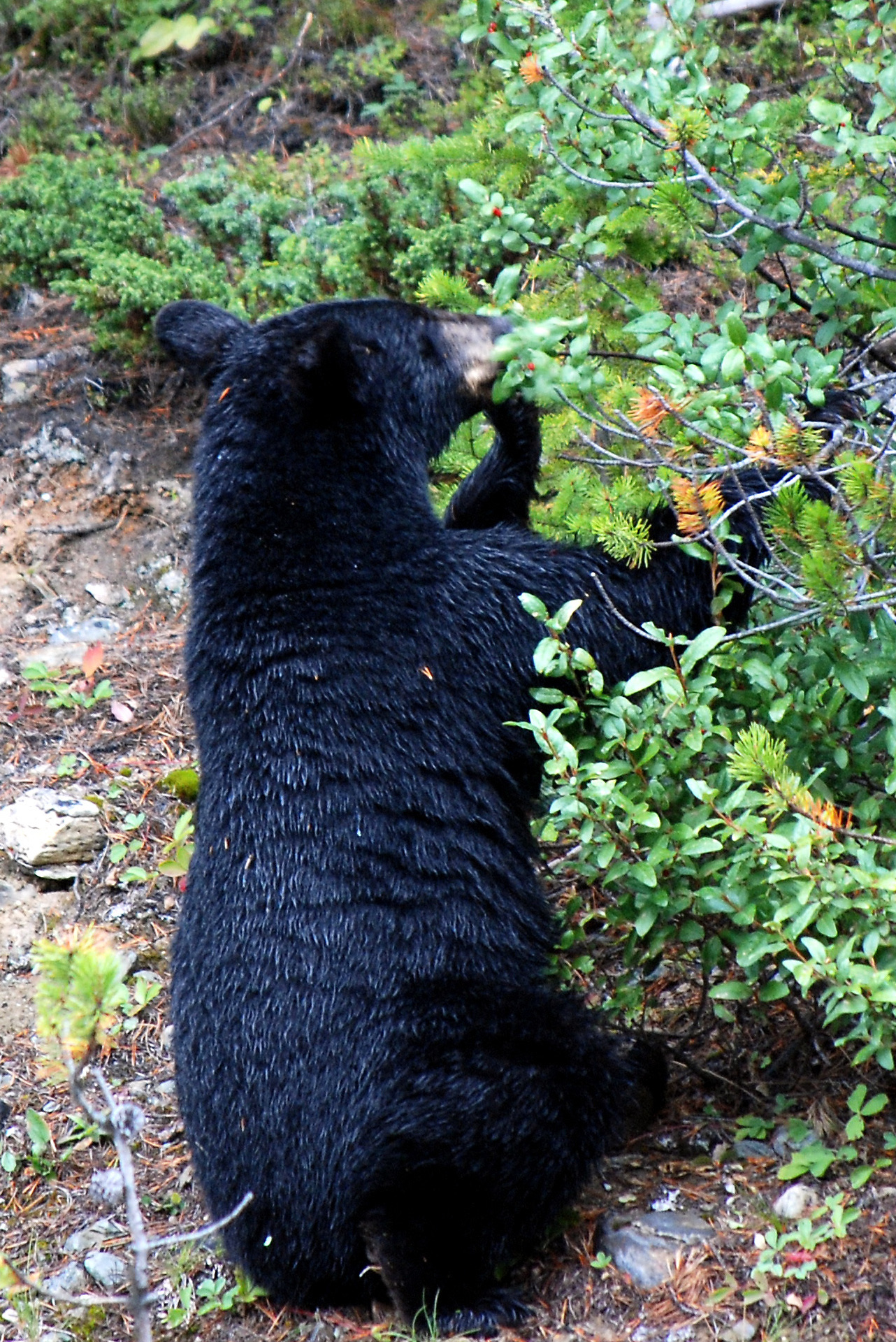
The population of black bears in the Rocky Mountains is neither dramatically increasing nor decreasing.

== Setting ==
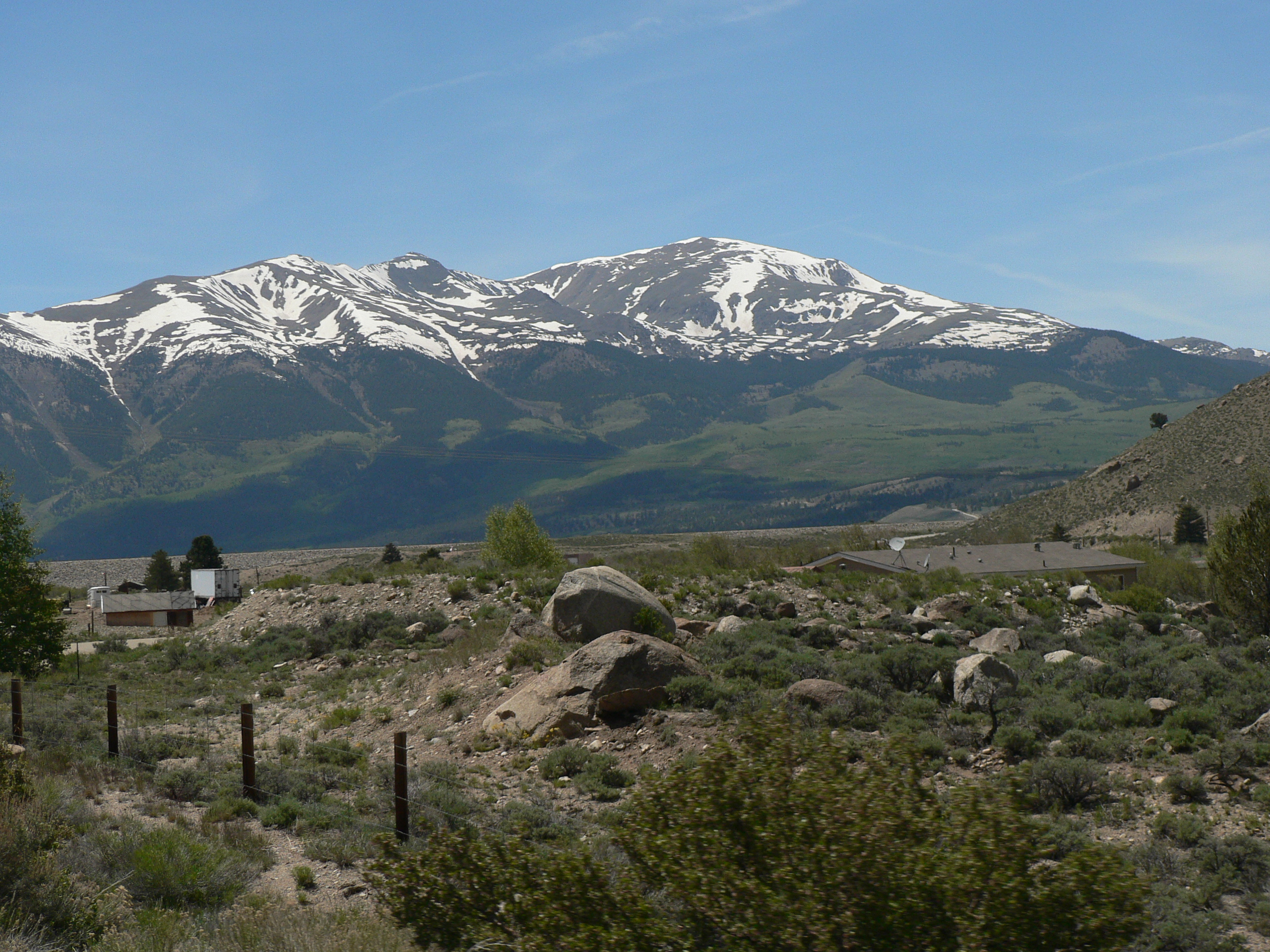
Mount Elbert rises through multiple biotic zones, with alpine tundra at its peak.

The Rocky Mountains range in latitude between the Liard River in British Columbia (at 59° N) and the Rio Grande in New Mexico (at 35° N), and in height up to the highest peak, Mount Elbert at 14,440 feet (4,400 m), taking in great valleys such as the Rocky Mountain Trench and San Luis Valley. Precipitation ranges from 10 inches (250 mm) per year in the southern valleys to 60 inches (1,500 mm) per year locally in the northern peaks. Average January temperatures can range from 20 °F (−7 °C) in Prince George, British Columbia to 43 °F (6 °C) in Trinidad, Colorado.

== Biotic zones ==
Ecologists divide the Rocky Mountain into a number of biotic zones, defined by whether they can support trees, and the presence of one or more indicator species. Areas of the Rockies that do not support or have few trees include the prairie of the eastern foothills and the Alpine tundra. The foothill prairie grassland lies to the east of the Rockies where the mountains fall to meet the Great Plains at the Rocky Mountain Front (below roughly 1,800 feet (550 m)). Alpine tundra meanwhile occurs in regions above the treeline, which varies from 12,000 feet (3,700 m) in New Mexico to 2,500 feet (760 m) at the northern end (near the Yukon).

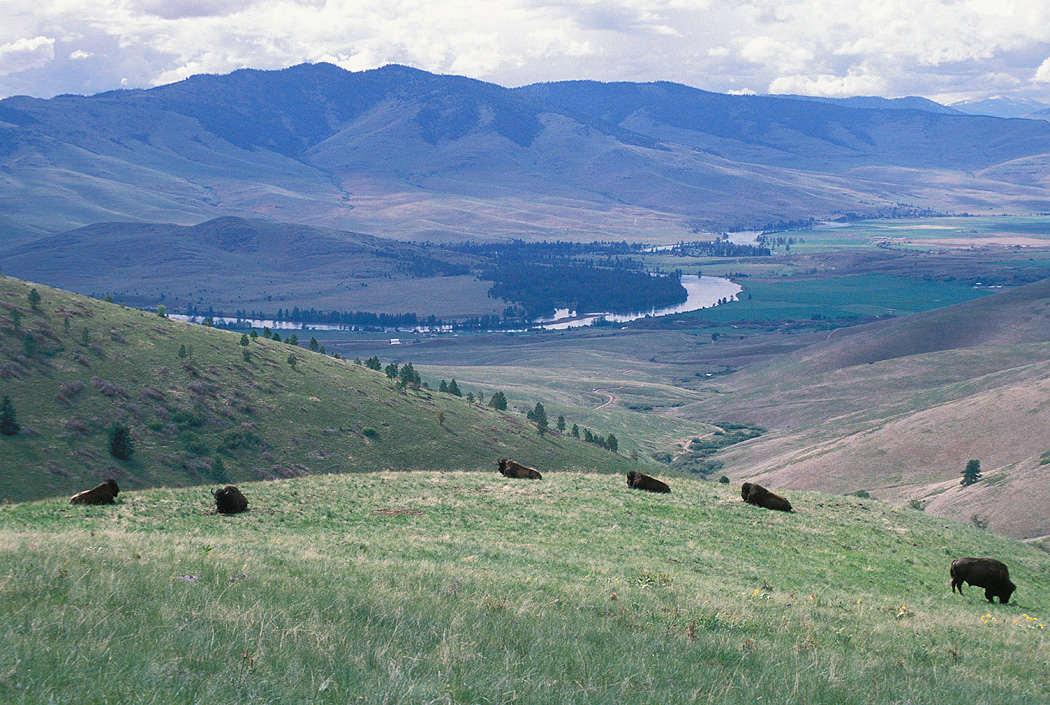
Bison grazing in grassland, Montana

The USGS defines ten forested zones in the Rocky Mountains. The more southern, warmer, drier zones are defined by the presence of pinyon pines/junipers, ponderosa pines, or oaks mixed with pines. The more northern, colder, wetter zones are defined by Douglas-firs, Cascadian species (such as western hemlock), lodgepole pines/quaking aspens, or firs mixed with spruce. Near the treeline, zones can consist of white pines (such as whitebark pine or bristlecone pine); or a mixture of white pine, fir, and spruce that appear as shrub-like krummholz. Finally, rivers and canyons are home to unique forest habitats even in the more arid parts of the mountain range.

Biotic zones and vegetation types in the Rocky Mountains can be explained by elevation, aspect, and precipitation. Clinton Merriam recognized that two-dimensional diagrams of elevation and aspect described plant community distribution in the Southern Rocky Mountains. Other ecologists generally embraced this two-dimensional view until the complexities of environmental gradients such as temperature, precipitation, solar radiation, wind, soils, and hydrology could be described and modeled. Peet provided the most complete description of 10 major forest community types, which are summarized here. Two nonforested vegetation types, plains and alpine tundra, described by Sims and Billings, are added. Because of the variations in latitude and precipitation along this huge mountain range, the elevations presented here are gross generalizations.

Extensive investigations have been made of the forests of the Rocky Mountains. Weber cautioned that the vegetation zones "overlap and telescope into each other considerably" in a landscape that is "always full of surprises." The resulting patchwork mosaic of vegetation types and disturbance regimes leads to a complex of side-by-side communities, wildlife habitats, and species distributions.

=== Plains ===
The eastern side of the Rocky Mountains is bordered by mixed-grass prairie to the north and by short-grass prairie to the south. The prairie, some of which has been described as the Montana Valley and Foothill grasslands generally extends to elevations of 5,900 feet (1,800 m). Dominant plants of the mixed grass prairie include little bluestem, needlegrasses, wheatgrasses, sand-reeds, and gramas, with dropseeds and cottonwoods in riparian zones. Short-grass prairie species include little bluestem, buffalo grass, western wheatgrass, sand dropseed, ringgrass, needle-and-thread, Junegrass, and galleta. Extensions of these vegetation types reach well into the Rocky Mountains along the valleys and on dry slopes. Plant species composition varies locally with changes in soil characteristics and topographic position—that is, from hilltops to valley bottoms.

=== Riparian and canyon forests ===
Broad-leaved deciduous cottonwoods, alders, and willows, and aspens line streamsides and canyons. The herbaceous layer in riparian communities is often more diverse than upslope areas and adjacent forests. Riparian and canyon vegetation types are generally too thin or too small to be displayed on regional vegetation maps, but the habitat is extremely important in the arid West.

=== Pinyon-juniper woodland ===
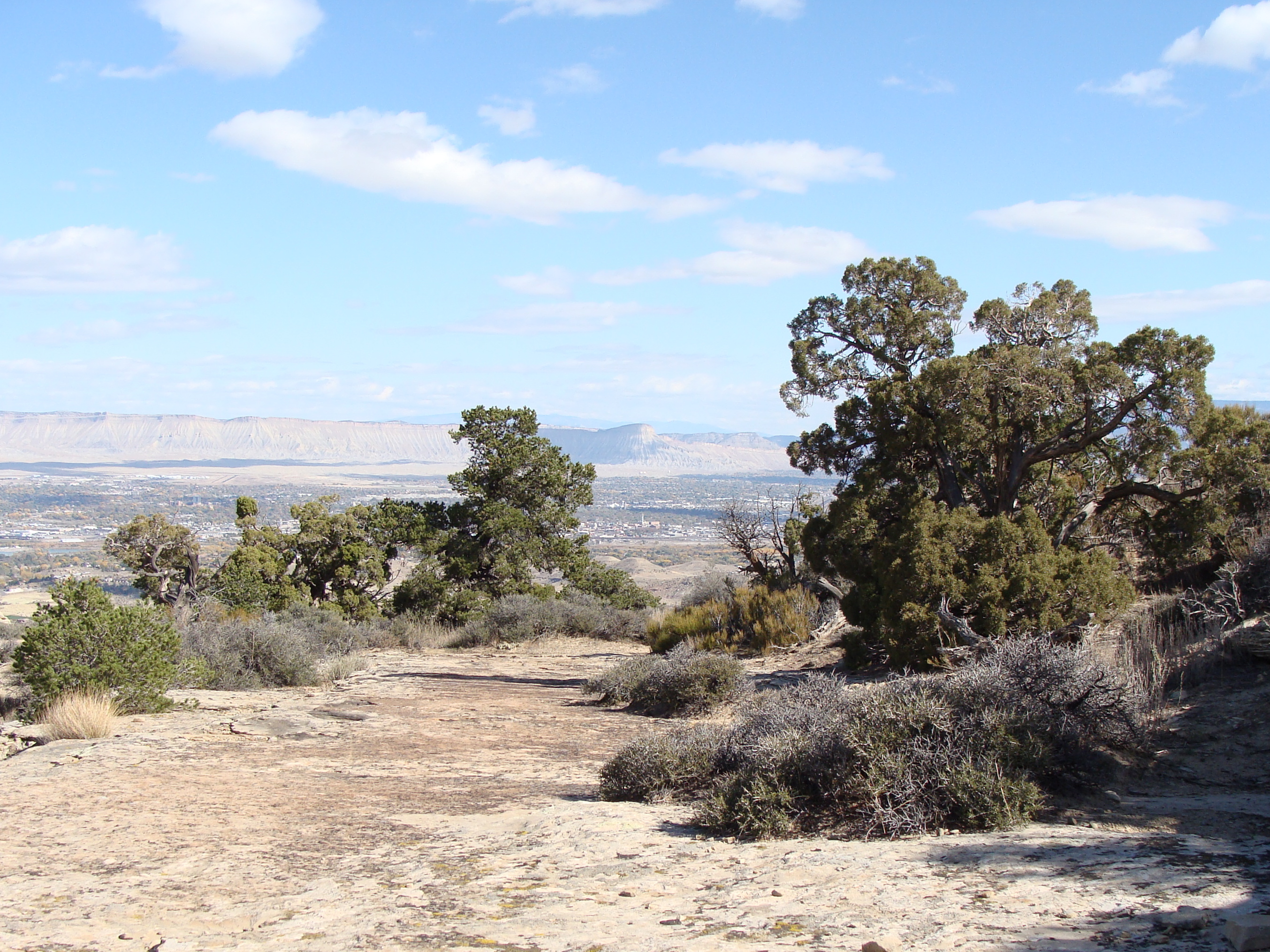
Colorado pinyons and Utah junipers growing near Grand Junction, Colorado

In the southern Rocky Mountains, a transition occurs between about 5,900 and 8,200 feet (1,800 and 2,500 m), where plains communities are accompanied by pinyon pines. Two-Needle Pinyons and singleleaf pinyons are found in western Utah, alligator junipers and Rocky Mountain junipers grow to the south, and Utah junipers grow to the north. Many shrubs and grasses of the plains occupy the gaps between tree outcrops. Heavy livestock grazing is associated with the spread of junipers (by reducing competition from grasses), and fire suppression is partly responsible for their continued dominance.

=== Ponderosa pine woodland ===
The appearance of ponderosa pine woodlands varies from scattered individuals in low-elevation or rocky areas to dense forests at higher elevations or on deeper soils. Although ponderosa pines dominate the biomass of this community, other tree species such as Douglas-fir and Rocky Mountain juniper, shrubs (for example, raspberries, big sagebrush, gooseberries, currants, bitterbrush), and herb layers (such as mountain muhly, sedges, and sagebrushes) can develop. Typical intervals between natural fires are less than 40 years in most ponderosa pine forests. Fires that recur every 10–20 years suppresses the growth of Douglas-fir saplings and encourages the growth of ponderosa pine.

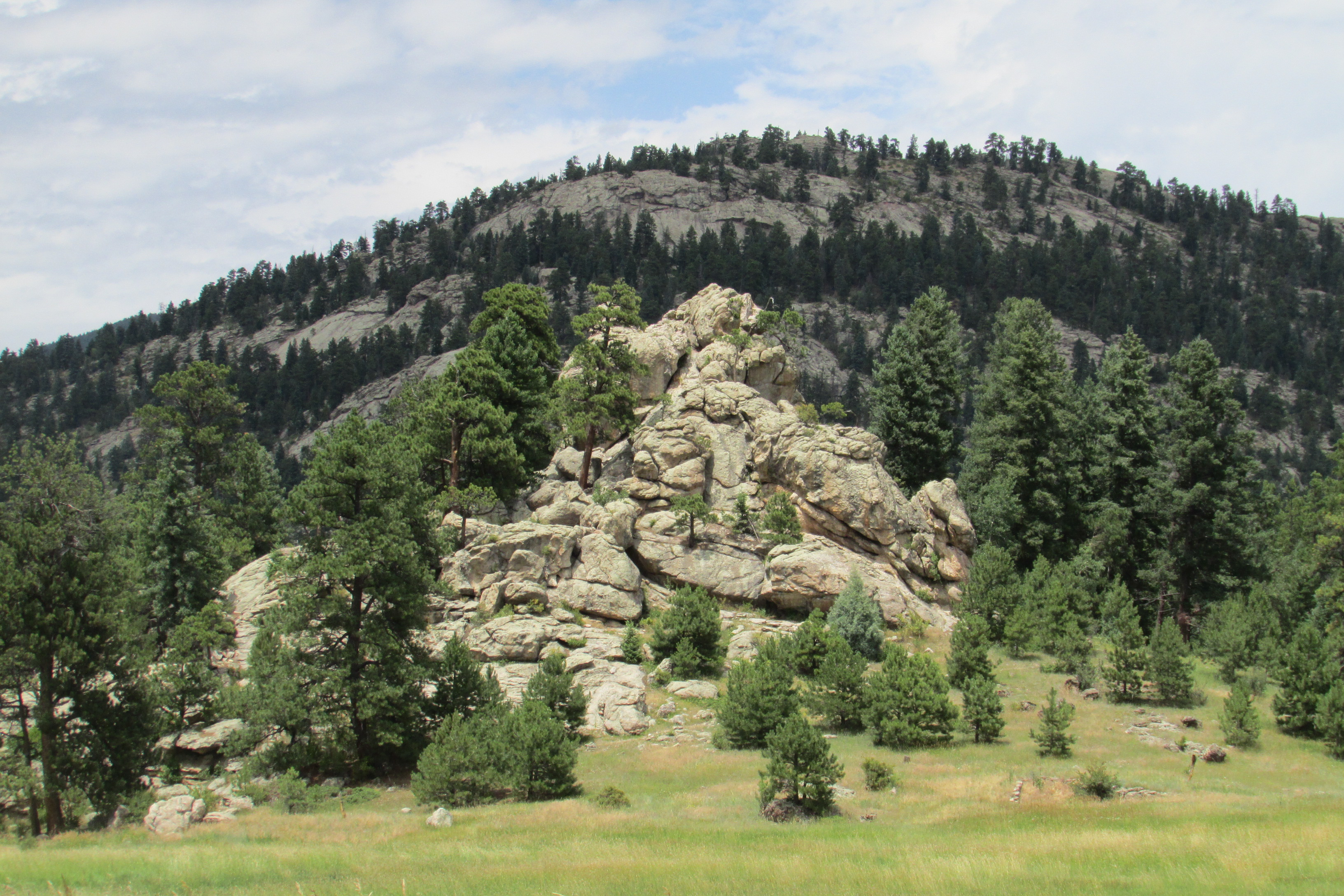
Open ponderosa pine forest in Colorado

In geological time, ponderosa pine ecosystems are relatively new to the foothills of the central Rocky Mountains. An even newer addition to the ecosystem, European-American settlers, devastated the ponderosa pine forests through logging for houses, fencing, firewood, mine timbers, and railroad ties, and with fire. The ponderosa pine forests were close to the developing population centers at the forest-prairie edge. The scale of the loss of ponderosa pine habitat is demonstrated best in several hundred paired photographs from the early 20th century and 1980s. However, nearly all the paired photographs also reveal that the most important feature of the ponderosa pine ecosystem is its resilience. Ponderosa pine seedlings establish quickly in disturbed sites. Research in the Front Range of Colorado shows a tenfold increase in ponderosa pine biomass since 1890 in many stands. This regeneration has restored habitat for many wildlife species but has also led to unnatural forest densities in many areas.

=== Pine-oak woodland ===
In the southern Rocky Mountains, lower slopes of ponderosa pine communities can be accompanied by Gambel oaks, other oak species (for example, Emory oaks, silverleaf oaks, netleaf oaks), and shrubs (such as sumacs, buckbrushes, and mountain-mahoganies). In the absence of fire, the oak stands may be invaded by pines.

=== Douglas-fir forest ===
Douglas-firs grow in a broad range from Mexico to British Columbia, generally from near lower treeline upward in elevation to spruce-fir forests. In Colorado, the species ranges from about 5,410 to 8,860 feet (1,650 to 2,700 m) and is often found in mixed stands with ponderosa pine, blue spruce, or lodgepole pine. Like ponderosa pine, Douglas-fir is tolerant of frequent, low-intensity surface fires. High-intensity fire intervals in Douglas-fir forests in Wyoming average 50–100 years.

=== Cascadian forest ===
Several tree species commonly associated with the Cascade Mountains grow on the rain-swept western slopes of the northern Rocky Mountains. These include western hemlock, western redcedar, grand fir, mountain hemlock, and larches. These forests are subject to infrequent, high-intensity fires.

=== Montane seral forest ===
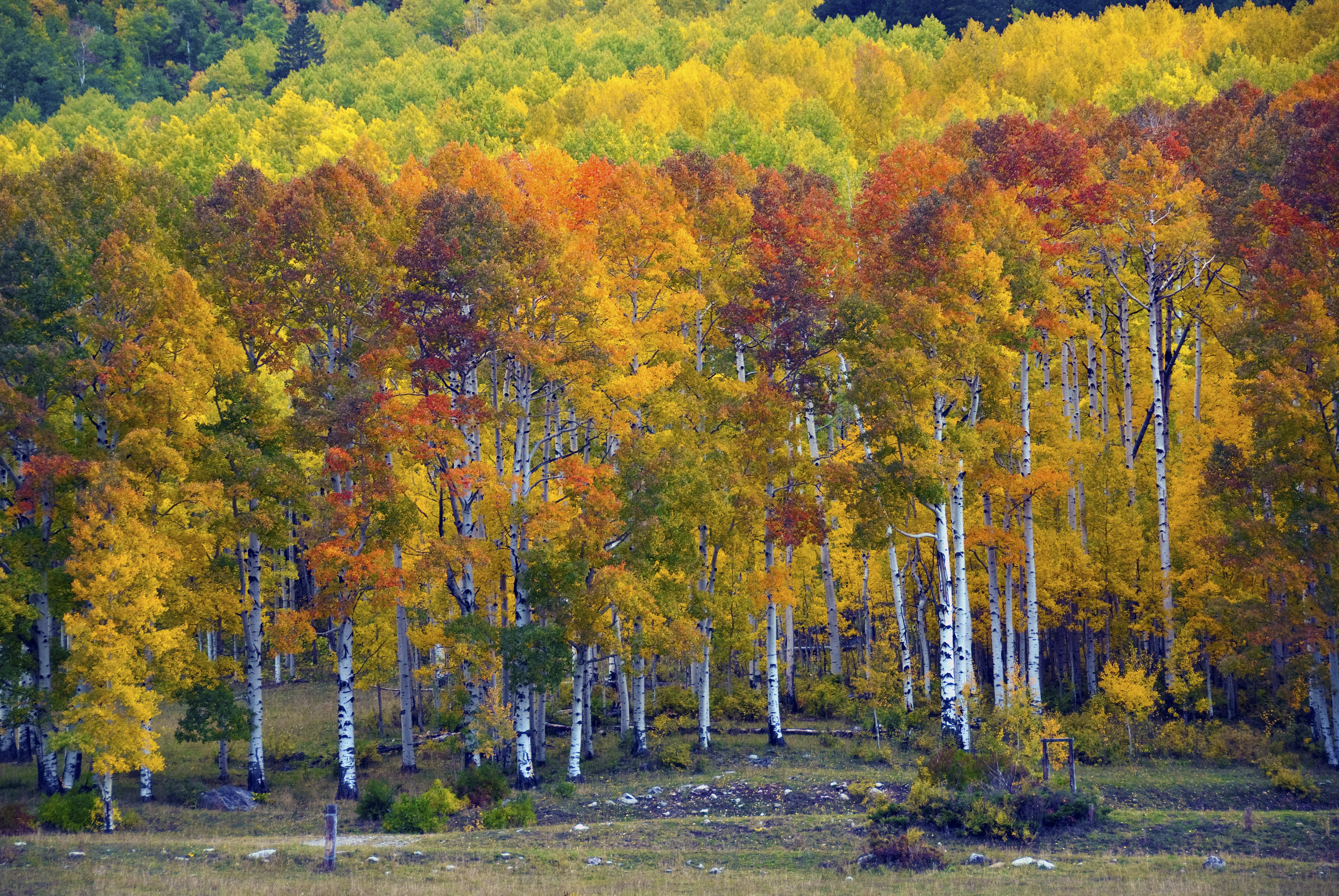
An aspen forest near Durango Mountain Resort, Colorado.

Lodgepole pine forests interspersed with stands of quaking aspens are fire-resilient forests that dominate the central and north-central Rocky Mountains. Usually found between 8,200 and 10,500 feet (2,500 and 3,200 m) in Colorado, lodgepole pines and aspens grow rapidly after fire in mostly even-aged stands. In the Canadian Rockies, the lodgepole pine/quaking aspen forests occur in the foothills, mixed with white spruce and balsam poplar. In the northern Canadian Rockies, black spruce also occurs in this biotic zone.

Intervals between fires typically range from 100 to 300 years. As evidenced by the fires in the Yellowstone National Park in 1988, lodgepole pine forests are rejuvenated by crown fires that replace tree stands. Aspen stands are keystone communities for hundreds of birds and mammals and are especially important forage for deer and elk.

=== Spruce-fir forest ===
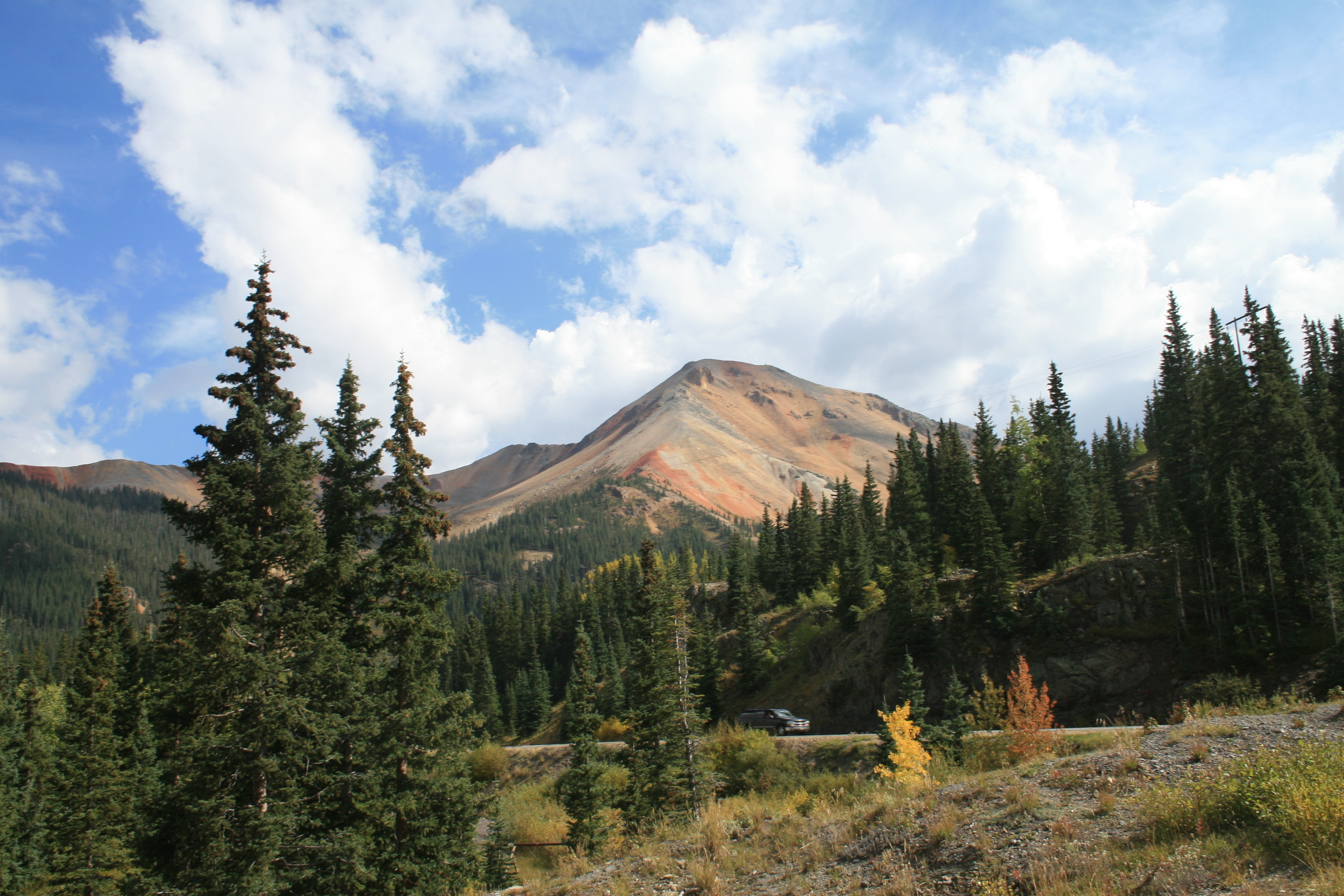
Spruce-fir forest near Red Mountain Pass, Colorado

The subalpine forests of the Rocky Mountains are characterized by spruces and firs and are floristically and structurally similar to the boreal conifer forests to the north. Dominant tree species in the Colorado Rocky Mountains subalpine forests include Engelmann spruce and subalpine fir, as well as lodgepole pine and the occasional Douglas-fir. In the Black Hills of South Dakota, white spruce replaces Engelmann spruce. Further north are the lodgepole pine, Engelmann spruce, and alpine fir mix of the Alberta Mountain forests above 5,495 feet (1,675 m) of elevation. Stand-replacing fires typically occur at 200- to 400-year intervals. Widespread insect outbreaks in spruce-fir forests occur more frequently. Recently, spruce bark beetles have begun to impact more old-growth spruce trees in these forests.

=== Subalpine white pine forest ===
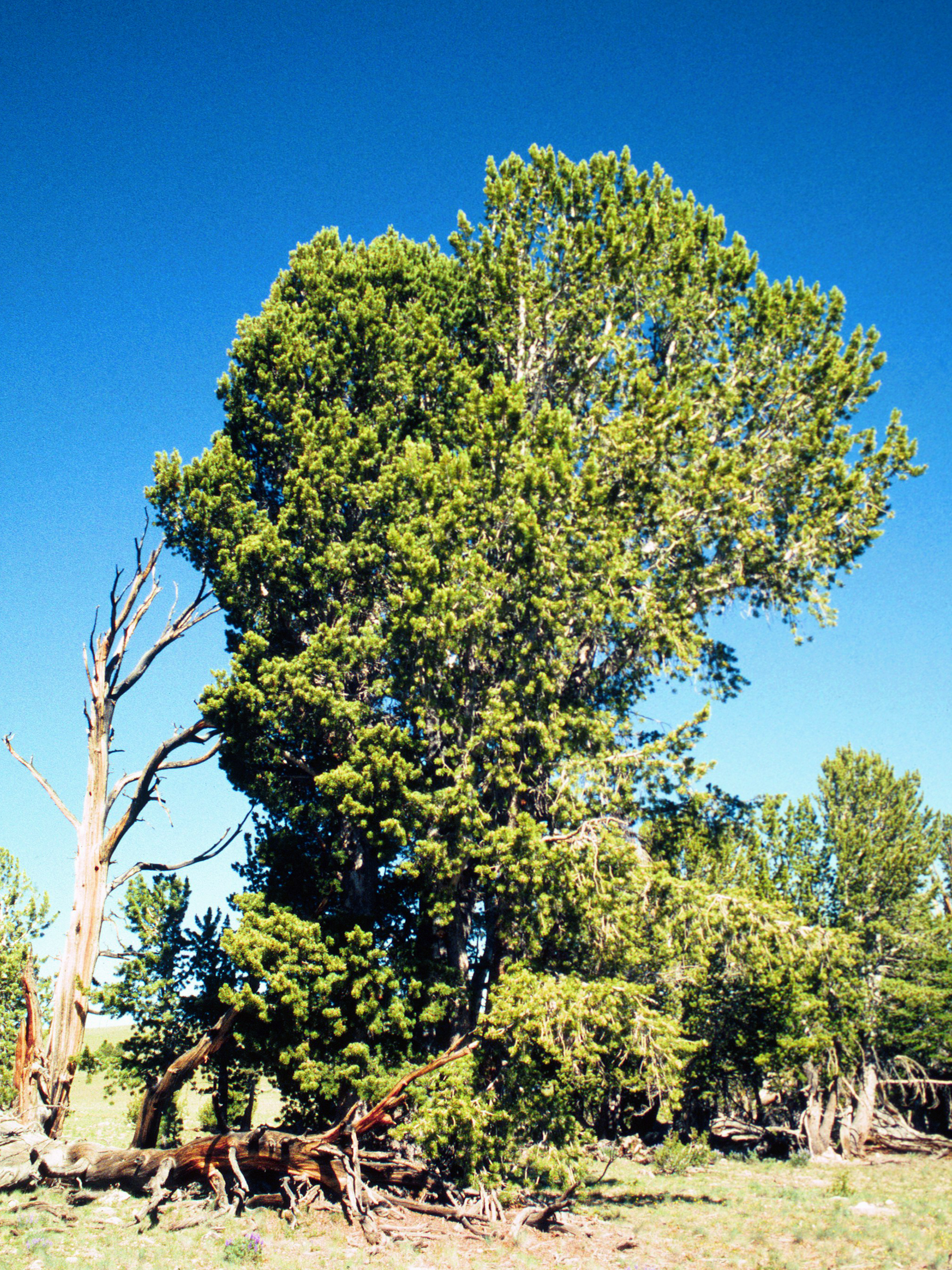
A whitebark pine in Central Idaho.

On exposed, dry slopes at high elevations, subalpine white pine forests replace spruce-fir forests. Common species of the white pine forests include whitebark pine in the northern Rocky Mountains, limber pine in the central and north-central Rocky Mountains, and bristlecone pine in the southern Rocky Mountains. Typical intervals between fires range from 50 to 300 years. The white pines are tolerant of extreme environmental conditions and can be important postfire successional species. The whitebark pine is a keystone species in upper subalpine forests of the northern Rocky Mountains. However, the whitebark pine has been in decline due to white pine blister rust: whitebark pine mortality in some areas exceeds 90%. Entire forest vistas, like that at Avalanche Ridge near Yellowstone National Park’s east gate, are expanses of dead, gray whitebarks.

=== Treeline vegetation ===
Treeline is the elevation above which trees cannot grow. It is controlled by a complex of environmental conditions, primarily soil temperatures and the length of the growing season—which becomes shorter with higher elevations. The elevation of treeline rises steadily at the rate of 330 feet (100 m) per degree of latitude from the northern to the southern Rocky Mountains. Dominant treeline species, including spruces, firs, and white pines, often have a shrublike form in response to the extreme conditions at the elevational limits of their physiological tolerance; such dwarfed trees are called krummholz. Krummholz islands may actually move about 3/4 inch per year (2 cm) in response to the wind; they reproduce by vegetative layering on their lee sides, while dying back from wind damage on their windward sides. Under favorable climatic conditions, krummholz can assume an upright treelike form or can increase their cone crops and seedling establishment.

=== Alpine tundra ===
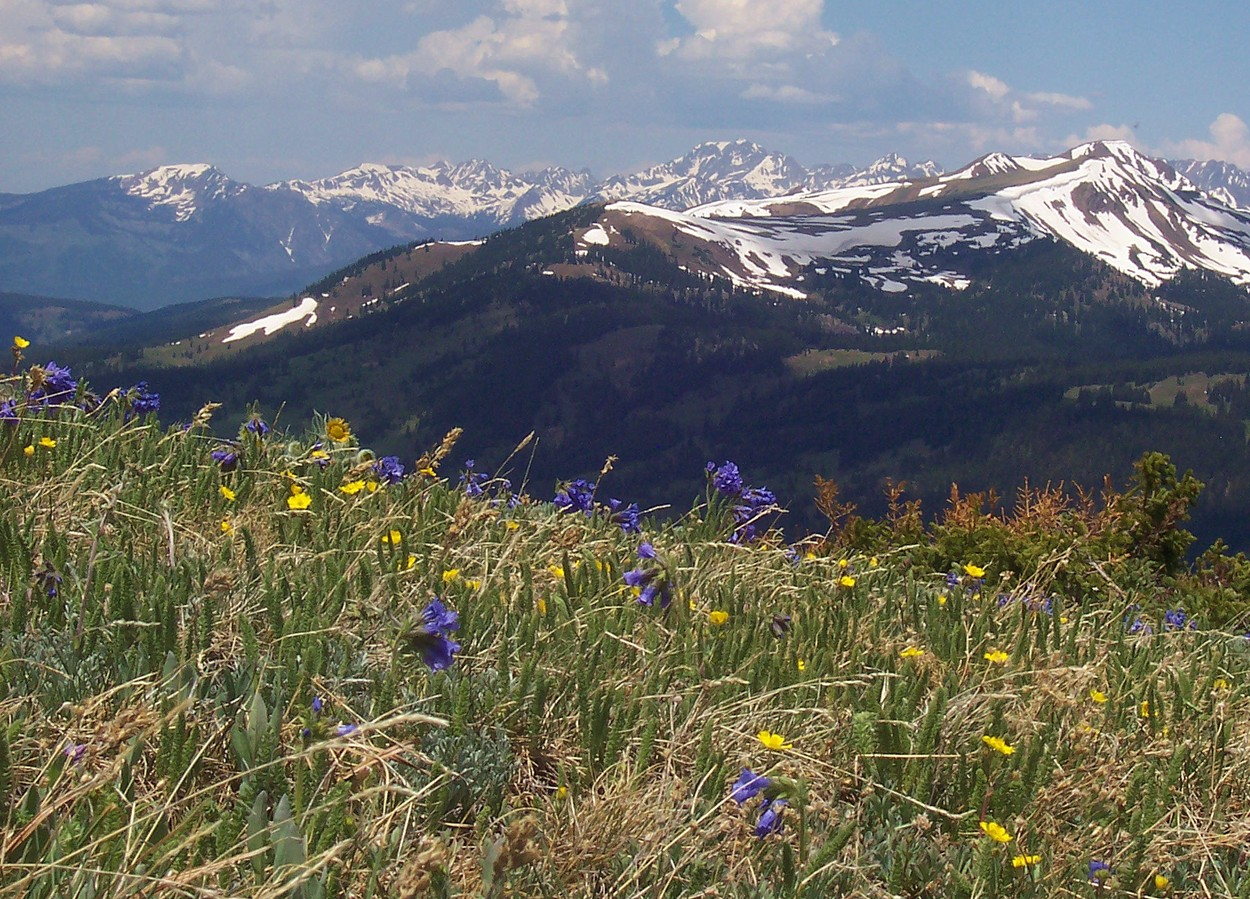
Flowers in an alpine meadow at Copper Mountain, Colorado

Alpine tundra is a complex of high-elevation meadows, fell (barren) fields, and talus or scree (rock) slopes above treeline. Depending on latitude, treeline occurs between 11,200 and 13,100 feet (3,400 and 4,000 m) in the United States, and 7,220 and 8,040 feet (2,200 and 2,450 m) in Canada. Grasses and sedges dominate the meadow communities, and fens (a type of wet meadow) and willows exist in wet soils. Vegetation in the alpine zone is similar to that in the Arctic: 47% of the plant species in the alpine zone of the Beartooth Mountains in Wyoming and Montana are also found in the Arctic. This high-diversity area includes alpine sage, tufted hairgrass, clovers, pussytoes, and succulents, and hundreds of grasses and wildflower species.

== Fauna ==
The Rocky Mountains are important habitat for a great deal of wildlife, such as elk, moose, mule deer, white-tailed deer, pronghorn, mountain goat, bighorn sheep, black bear, grizzly bear, gray wolf, coyote, cougar, bobcat, Canada lynx, and wolverine. North America's largest herds of moose is in the Alberta-British Columbia foothills forests. The status of most species in the Rocky Mountains is unknown due to incomplete information. Even basic regional information is not available on many nocturnal species (for example, bats, raccoons, and so forth); invertebrates; lichens, mosses, and fungi; and soil microorganisms.

European-American settlement of the mountains has adversely impacted native species. Examples of some species that are known to have declined include western toads, greenback cutthroat trout, white sturgeons, white-tailed ptarmigans, trumpeter swans, and bighorn sheep. In the United States portion of the mountain range, apex predators such as grizzly bears and gray wolves had been extirpated from their original ranges, but have partially recovered due to conservation measures and reintroduction. Other recovering species include the bald eagle and the peregrine falcon. Species such as the black bear and mountain lion, many small mammals, and common bird and plant species are described as stable because, in most instances, the populations are persistent and not rapidly increasing or declining.

=== Invertebrates ===
Although most of the animals in the Rocky Mountains are invertebrates, little is known about this component of the region's fauna. As one entomologist stated, "We do not know how many species of moths and butterflies live in any state, county, or locality in North America". In a few areas in the western United States, information is available on the species richness of moths and butterflies. Most of the Rocky Mountain states and the Front Range of Colorado in particular support high species richness of butterflies and moths. In Colorado, the diverse habitats—from prairie to tundra—support about 2,000 species of butterflies, moths, and skippers; more than 1,000 species are in the Front Range. Some species of grasshoppers are unique to individual mountaintops in Colorado, New Mexico, Arizona, Nevada, and Utah. The Rocky Mountain locust, a common pest to farmers in the 19th century, is now extinct. Heavy grazing along river valleys in Montana and Idaho is thought to have irreparably destroyed locust breeding areas.

=== Amphibians ===
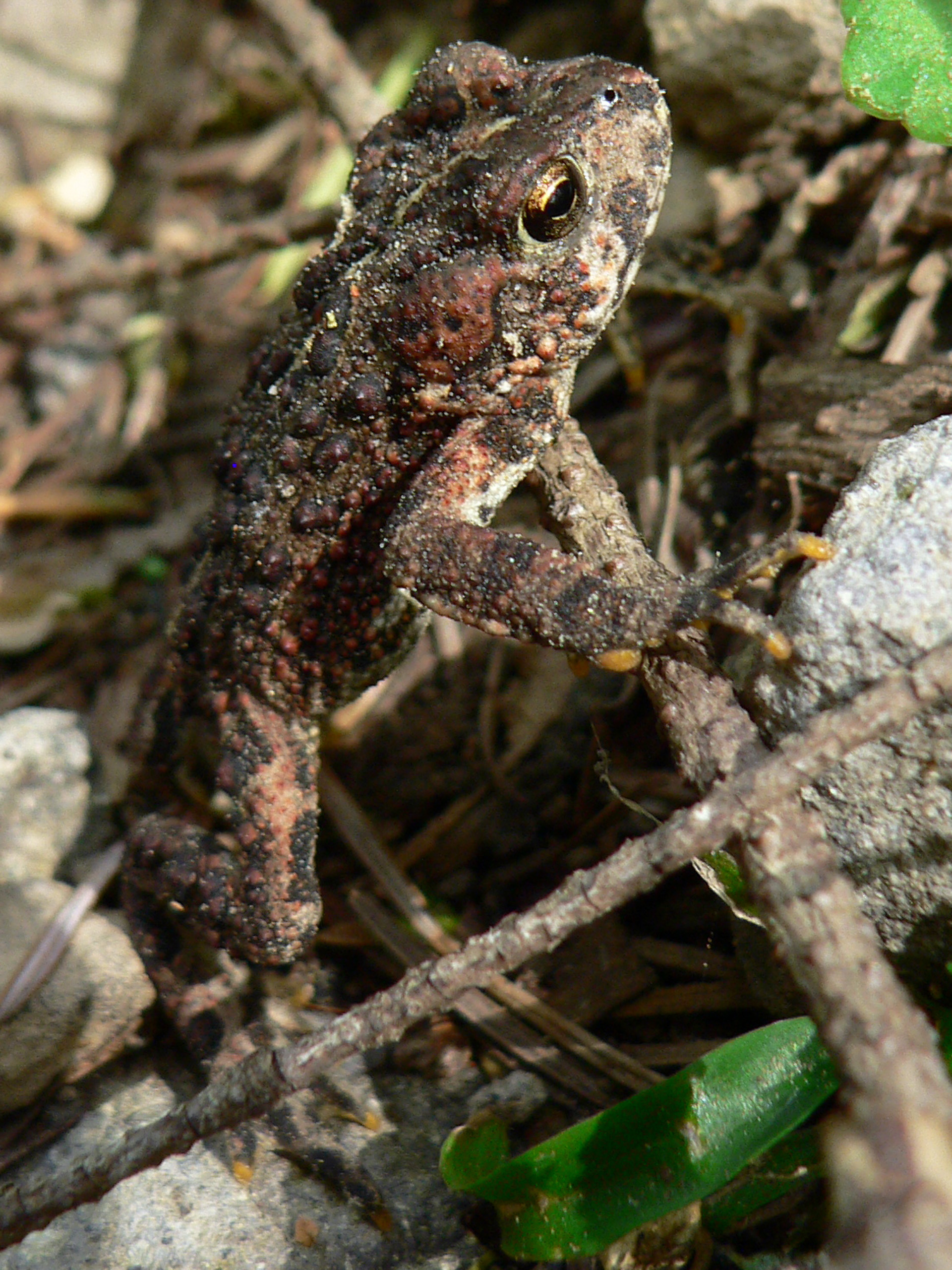
The western toad

Globally, populations of amphibians are declining in size as a result of habitat loss, predation by nonindigenous sport fishes, timber harvest, increased ultraviolet radiation, and disease. The widespread declines of amphibian populations throughout the Rocky Mountains mirror these global trends. Western toads, once common between altitudes of 7,500 and 13,800 feet (2,300 and 4,200 m) throughout the central and northern Rocky Mountains, now occupy less than 20% of their previous range, from southern Wyoming to northern New Mexico. Eleven populations of western toads disappeared from the West Elk Mountains of Colorado between 1974 and 1982 because of a bacterial infection and, perhaps, multiple sublethal environmental causes. The number of breeding sites in Rocky Mountain National Park has declined to only 3. In the past two decades, western toads disappeared from 83% of their historical range in Colorado and from 94% of Wyoming sites. Populations of northern leopard frogs are significantly declining throughout the Rocky Mountains.

=== Fish ===
The Rocky Mountains are home to a number of coldwater fish in the trout and salmon families, including rainbow trout, bull trout, lake trout, cutthroat trout, brown trout, brook trout, golden trout, mountain whitefish, Arctic grayling, and Dolly Varden. Many of these, however, are introduced, such as rainbow, brown, and brook trout.

==== Colorado River cutthroat trout ====
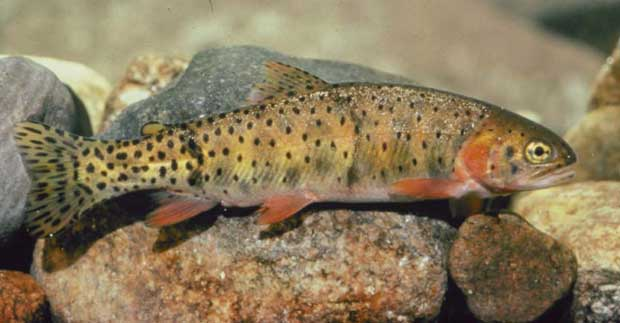
The Colorado River Cutthroat trout, a native of western Colorado, eastern Utah, northwestern New Mexico, and southwestern Wyoming

Colorado River cutthroat trout were once abundant in mountainous tributaries of the Green and Colorado rivers, but non-native brown, brook, and rainbow trout had displaced them by the 1930s. They still survived in some isolated pockets, however, and these populations have been used to restore the cutthroats to many areas in their historic range. One of the largest strongholds was, and is, Trappers Lake in Colorado's Flat Top Mountains. However, in 1984, brook trout invaded because a flood washed them downstream from nearby Crescent Lake. By 2003, brook trout comprised 40 percent of the lake's fish population. Brook trout have an advantage over cutthroat trout because they spawn in fall. By the time Colorado River cutthroats hatch in August, brook trout fingerlings may be able to eat them. Colorado Parks and Wildlife is controlling their population with large nets and selective removal.

==== Rio Grande cutthroat trout ====
Rio Grande cutthroat trout currently live on 700 miles of stream in the Santa Fe National Forest, which is approximately 91% of their historical range. The Rio Grande cutthroat trout was a candidate for listing under the Endangered Species Act from 2008 to 2014. In 2014 it was removed from candidacy as it was determined that listing was not warranted for this species. Rio Grande cutthroat have the distinction of being the southernmost subspecies of cutthroat trout. However, due to the loss of populations across their native range and reports of Rio Grande cutthroat in Mexico and Texas, it is unclear how far south this trout once occurred. In 1955, it was designated the state fish of New Mexico.

==== Greenback cutthroat trout ====
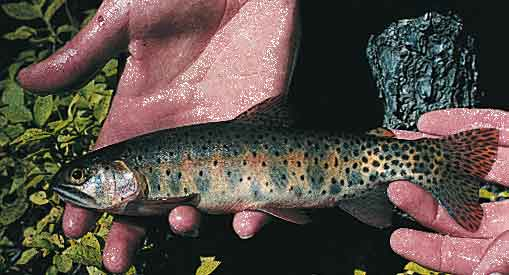
A greenback cutthroat trout

The Greenback cutthroat trout was originally thought extinct in 1937. However, in the 1950s, scientists found putative greenbacks on the eastern slopes of the Front and Sawatch ranges in Colorado. A campaign by Colorado Division of Wildlife and several federal agencies introduced these fish to many areas in the trout's former range. In 1996, it was designated as Colorado's state fish. Then in 2012, researchers at the University of Colorado found that the only pure population of these fish was in a small stream in the Arkansas River basin, outside their native range. Since then they have been reintroduced to Zimmerman Lake on the edge of northern Colorado's Neota Wilderness and Sand Creek in Red Mountain Open Space north of Fort Collins.

==== Yellowstone cutthroat trout ====
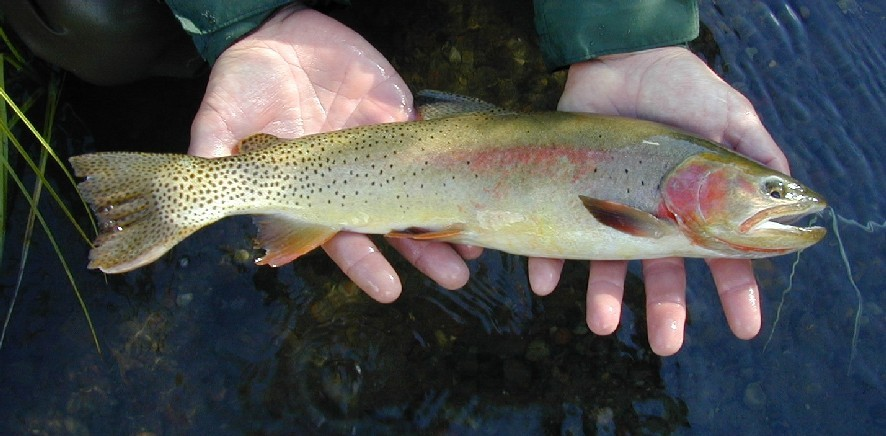
The Yellowstone cutthroat trout

Yellowstone Lake in Yellowstone National Park, Wyoming, is the site of the most recent catastrophic species invasion. The Washington Post reported that the nonindigenous lake trout, a native of the Great Lakes, had been insidiously introduced into one of the nation's premier fisheries. The native Yellowstone cutthroat trout may not compete well with lake trout because lake trout eat cutthroat trout. The potential ecological repercussions are staggering. If populations of cutthroat trout continue to decline, grizzly bears could lose an important post-hibernation food because the native cutthroat trout spawn in the streams and are easy prey for the bears, whereas the nonindigenous lake trout spawn in deep water. The National park Service has begun an aggressive attempt to eradicate the invasive fish by hiring commercial fishing crews, and have removed over 1.7 million with gill nets. It is estimated that for every lake trout removed from Yellowstone Lake, 41 cutthroat trout are saved. So far the cutthroat trout have shown modest signs of recovery. However, other threats to the trout remain, such as whirling disease, brought from Europe by nonnative brown trout.

==== Mountain whitefish ====
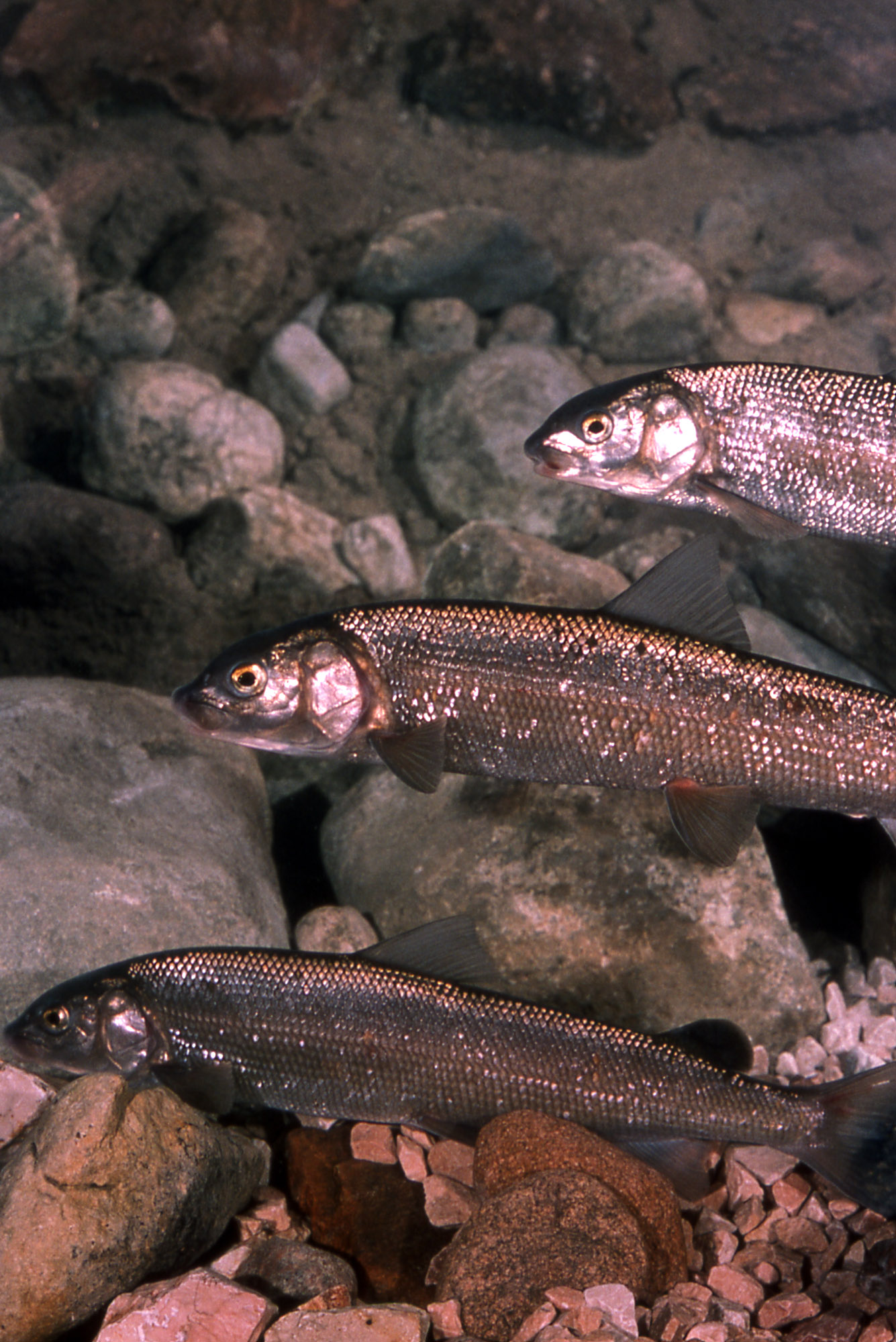
Mountain whitefish fry in Yellowstone National Park

Mountain whitefish, unlike cutthroat trout, have not declined significantly in their native range. They are indigenous to much of Wyoming, Montana, and Idaho, as well as Colorado's Yampa River drainage. They have also been introduced to some areas outside of their native range, like the Poudre and Fryingpan rivers in western Colorado.

==== White sturgeon ====
The largest freshwater fish in the Rocky Mountains (and North America) is also in trouble. The white sturgeon historically ranged from the mouth of the Columbia River to the Kootenai River upstream to Kootenai Falls, Montana. The Kootenai River population of the white sturgeon is unstable and declining in size; fewer than 1,000 remain, 80% are older than 20 years, and virtually no recruitment has occurred since 1974, soon after Libby Dam in Montana began regulating flows.

=== Birds ===
The Rocky Mountains are home to over 300 species of birds. These include raptor species that migrate through the mountains, such as golden eagles, bald eagles, and ospreys. Owls, such as the great horned owl, the boreal owl, and the great grey owl make their homes in the forests. Ptarmigans are common above treeline. Many songbirds, including wrens, warblers, and finches

==== Bald eagles ====
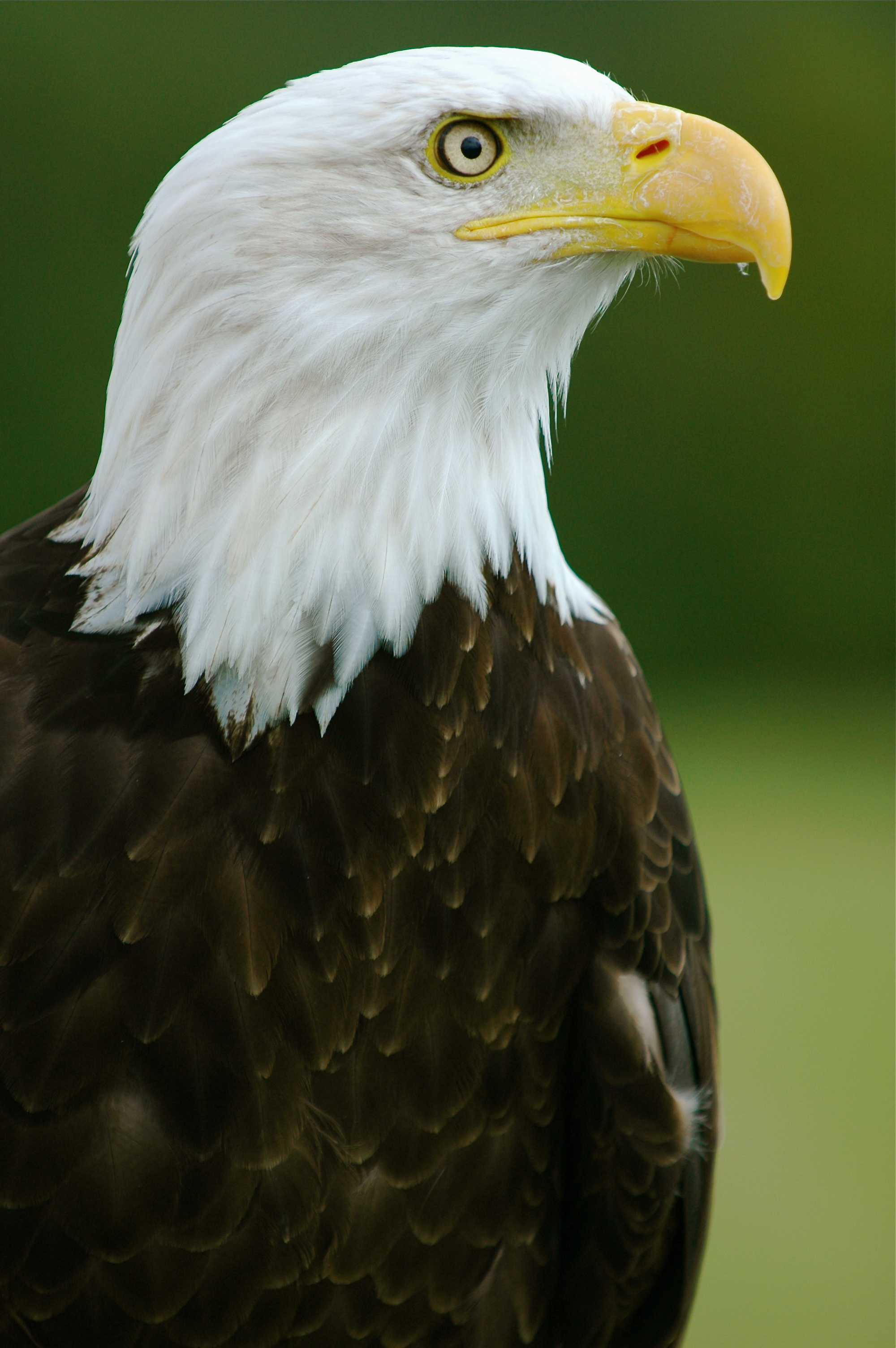
A bald eagle

The coniferous and deciduous forests of North America have long been the home of bald eagles. Bald eagle populations are now recovering after years of hunting, habitat destruction, and pesticide-induced deaths. In the early 1970s, Colorado had just one breeding pair of bald eagles but by 1993 biologists counted 19 breeding pairs. In Wyoming nesting attempts increased from 20 in 1978 to 42 in 1988. The bald eagle has not yet fully recovered, however; pesticide residues continue to inhibit bald eagle reproduction, and habitat loss and lead poisoning remain serious threats.

==== Peregrine falcons ====
Peregrine falcons are cliff-dwelling raptors that once ranged through most of North America. Like the bald eagle, this species was driven to near extinction by pesticides. By 1965 fewer than 20 breeding pairs were known west of the Great Plains. Even in the Greater Yellowstone ecosystem, federal spruce budworm control relied on DDT, which accumulates in the food chain, causing eggshell thinning and reduced reproductive success in raptors. Six breeding pairs of American peregrine falcons were found in Colorado in the early 1970s. By 1994, 53 pairs were breeding in Colorado. In Wyoming, Montana, and Idaho combined, 8 of 59 historical sites were used by falcons in 1987. Low breeding densities, reproductive isolation, habitat loss, and pesticide poisoning on wintering grounds remain threats to peregrine falcon recovery.

==== White-tailed ptarmigans ====
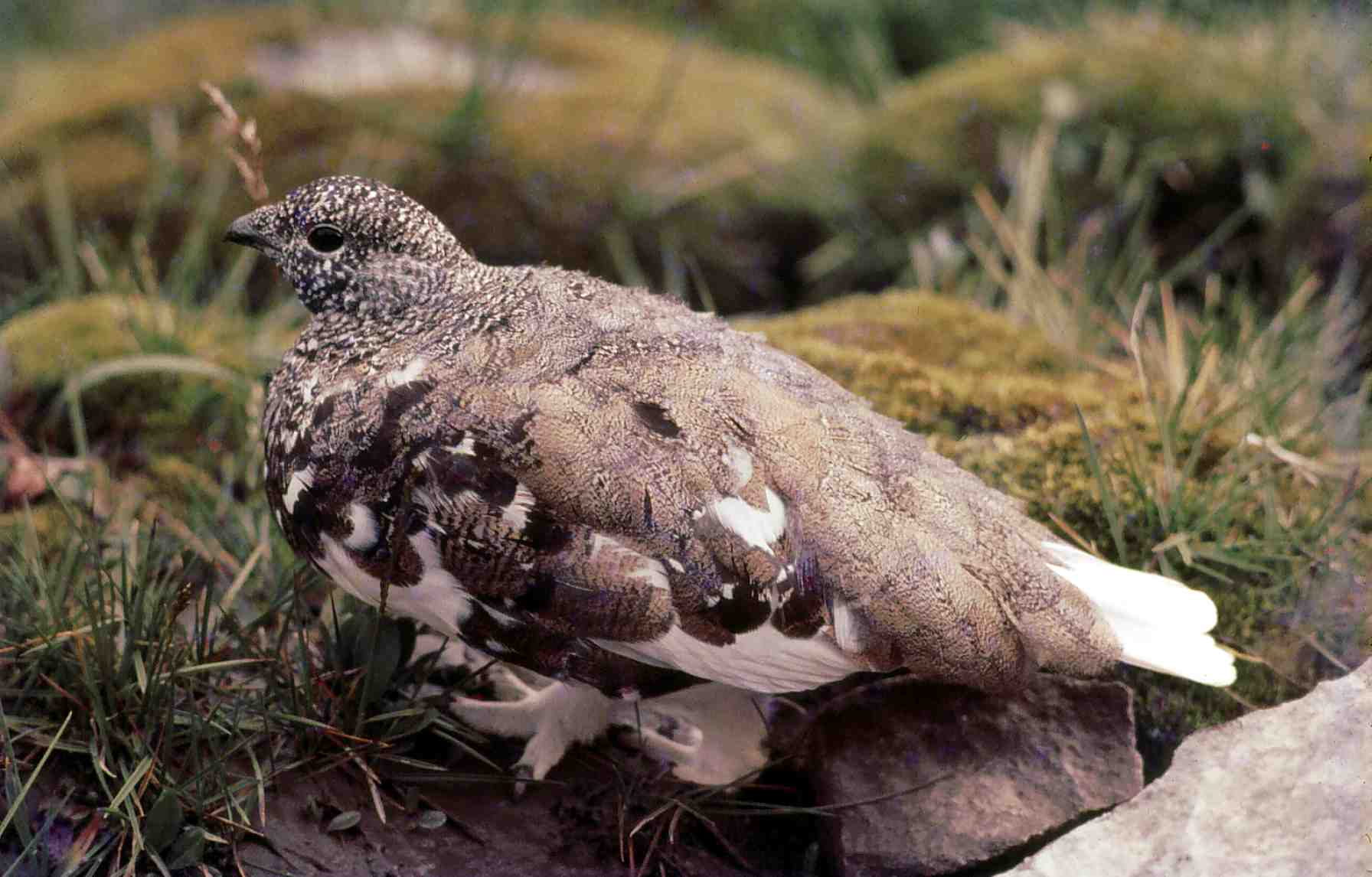
White-tailed ptarmigan in Alberta

White-tailed ptarmigans have been monitored in Rocky Mountain National Park, Colorado, since 1966. Short-term population cycles are well documented in populations that are not hunted but not in populations outside the park, which are hunted. Although detailed population size data are available from more than 28 years of monitoring, scant information is available on habitat change, predator populations, or other potential causes of change in ptarmigan populations. In the park, the population seems to be increasing. A 2-year study revealed lower ptarmigan densities where elk use was greater, although characteristics of willow, which is ptarmigan habitat, did not significantly differ in the high- and low-use elk sites. Furthermore, a 2-year study of ptarmigan habitat cannot explain 28-year trends in population size. Habitat loss and other factors partly responsible for ptarmigan deaths—such as predation and competition—were not studied during the 28-year period.

==== Ducks and geese ====
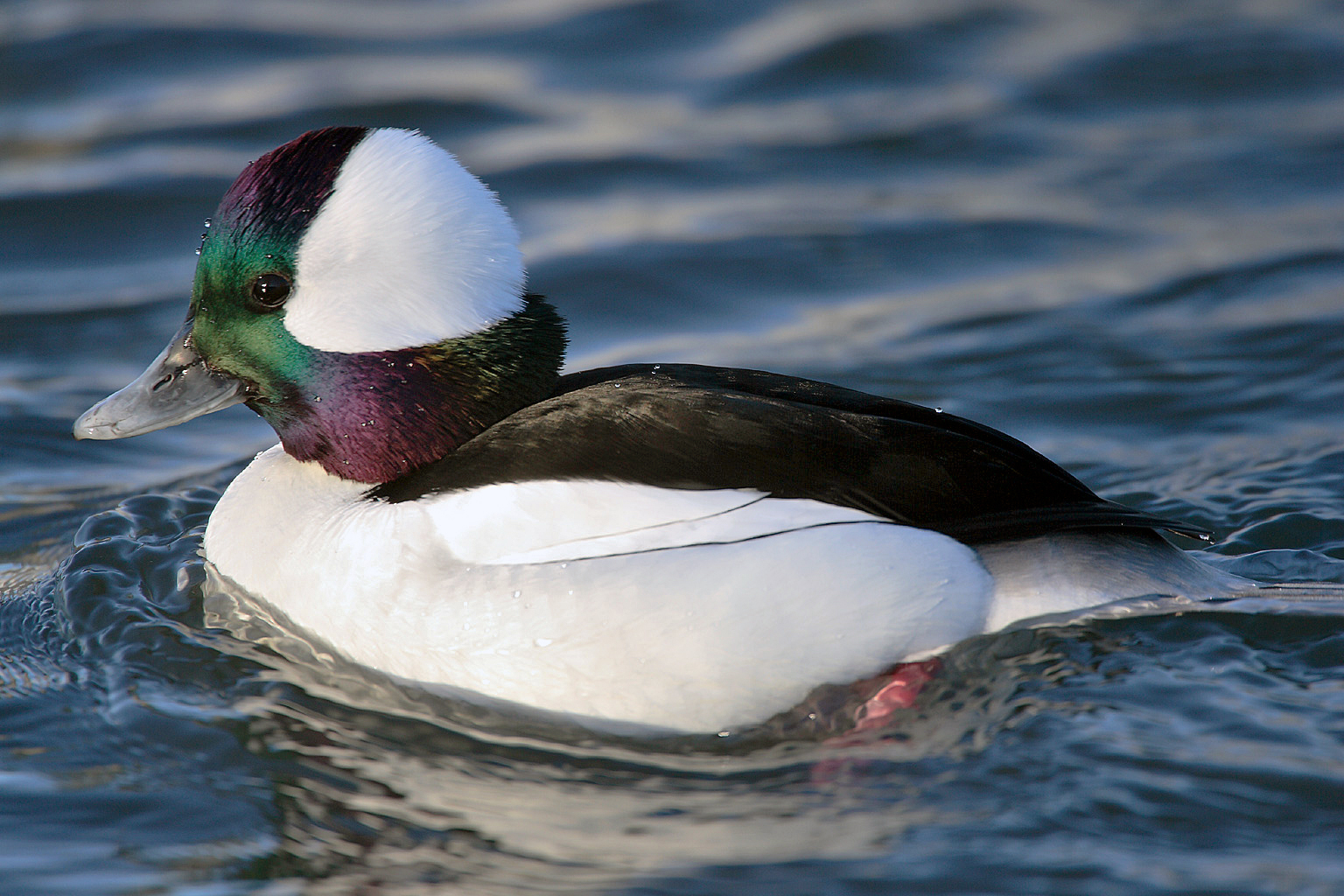
A bufflehead, one of many duck species found in the Rockies' lakes and streams

Many species of waterfowl inhabit the wetlands of the Rocky Mountains, including diving ducks such as goldeneyes and mergansers and dabbling ducks such as mallards and wigeons. Some species migrate, while other species stay in the Rockies year-round. Canada geese are also commonly found here. Many ducks provide food for raptors such as bald eagles and peregrine falcons as well as an occasional coyote or bobcat.

==== Trumpeter swans ====
Trumpeter swan populations were seriously threatened in the 1930s; fewer than 70 birds were thought to exist. Now protected from hunting, more than 1,500 swans winter in the Greater Yellowstone ecosystem, but the size of the breeding population has declined in recent years because of habitat loss.

==== Neotropical migrant songbirds ====
Many forest-dwelling songbirds breed in the Rocky Mountains and winter in Central and South America. Wildlife biologists suspect that population size declines in the songbirds may be partly the result of increased predation and brood parasitism. Brood parasitism by brown-headed cowbirds, for example, increases as a result of nearby logging. In conifer forests in west-central Idaho, common songbirds benefited from timber harvest, whereas the abundances declined of rare species that inhabit old-growth forests (hermit thrush, Swainson's thrush, and pileated woodpecker).

=== Mammals ===
==== Black bears ====
Black bears are the most common bear species in the Rocky Mountains, ranging widely through the forested regions of the range. In Colorado, the largest populations of black bears live in habitats with Gambel oak and aspen as well as chokecherry and serviceberry. They can be seen feeding on berries, grasses, and small animals. Colorado has a population of 19,000 of the bears, up from 12,000 in the early 2000s.

==== Grizzly bears ====
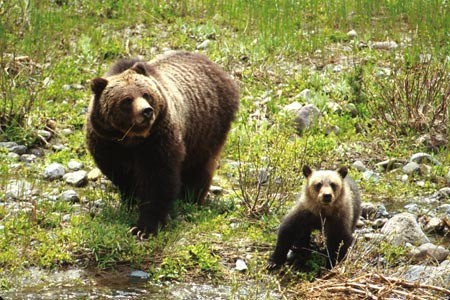
Grizzly bear and cub in the Shoshone National Forest, Wyoming

Grizzly bears once roamed throughout the Rocky Mountains and the western Great Plains. They were hunted relentlessly by European settlers in the 19th century and early 20th century. The last known grizzly bear in Colorado was killed in 1979. The decline of the bears to just 2% of their original range tells of the human-caused extirpation of large predators in the Rocky Mountain region. Only 700-900 grizzly bears may be alive today in the conterminous United States, with 300 grizzlies alive in the Canadian Rockies. During the last 20 years, about 88% of all grizzly bears studied in the northern Rocky Mountains were killed by humans. The U.S. Fish and Wildlife Service is considering delisting the grizzly in Montana, Idaho, and Wyoming.

==== Cougars ====
Cougars are one of the most important carnivores in the ecosystems of the Rockies. They prefer to prey on mule deer, but occasionally kill elk, white-tailed deer, and bighorn sheep, and in Alberta, moose kills have been documented. Recently, cougars have recolonized many areas where they were eliminated in the 1800s and early 1900s, and have greatly increased in number. The highest densities of cougars are in foothill and montane areas, which are more diverse and rich than subalpine or alpine environments.

==== Gray wolves ====
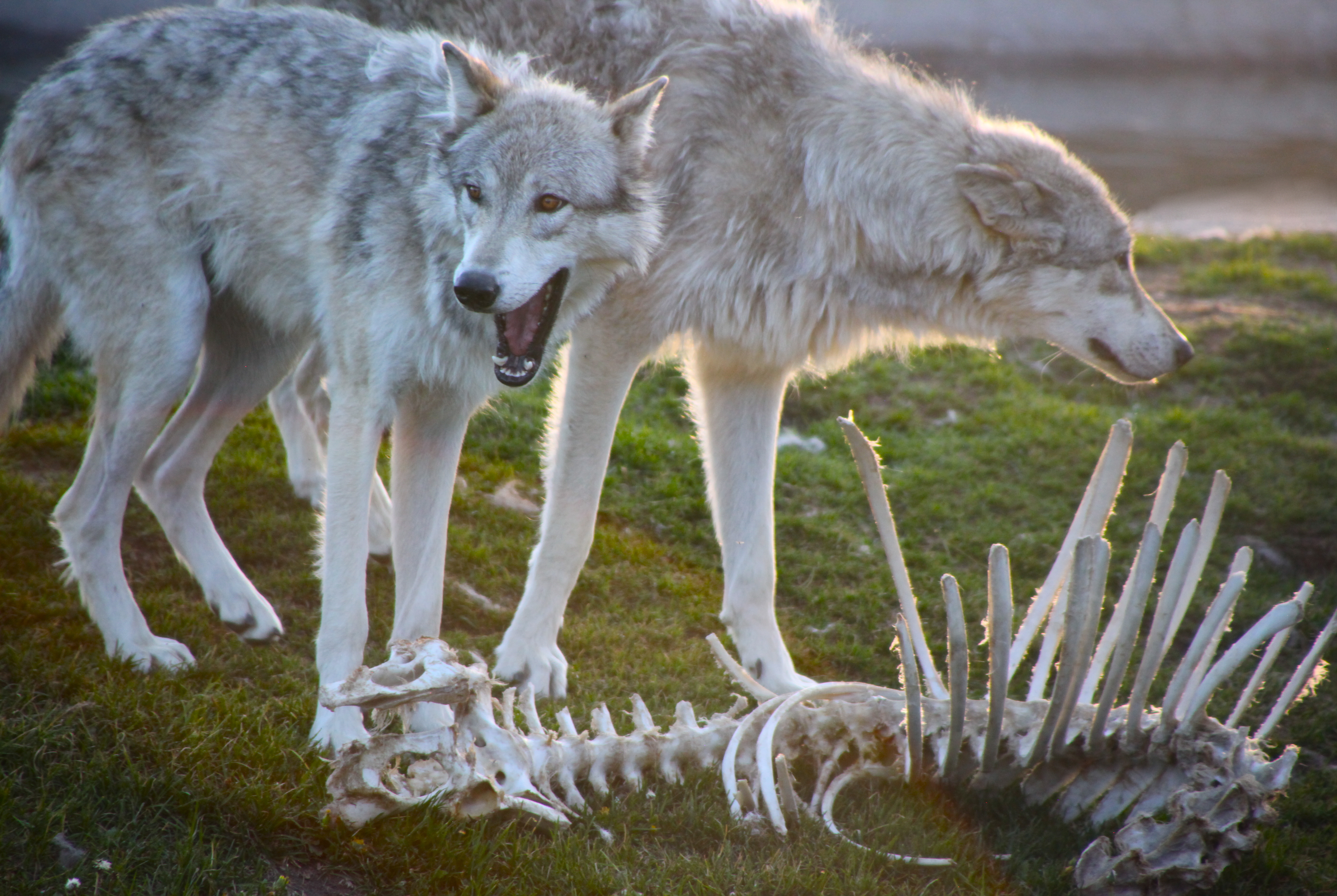
Gray wolves in Yellowstone National Park

Wolves once were common throughout the Rocky Mountains. They were shot, poisoned, and trapped into local extinction by early settlers and federal agents. The last Gray wolf in Colorado was killed in 1940, and the wolf was first listed as an endangered species in 1967. Wolves from southeastern British Columbia recolonized northwestern Montana in 1986; by 1994 the population had grown to 7 packs and about 70-75 wolves. Wolves from Glacier National Park have dispersed naturally as far away as northeastern Idaho and just south of Yellowstone National Park. A wolf was shot near Yellowstone National Park in 1992. From January to March 1995, 15 adult wolves from 7 different packs in Canada were introduced into central Idaho wilderness areas. Several pairs have bred and produced the first litters of wolf pups born in Idaho in more than 50 years. Fourteen wolves (three family groups) were released in the Yellowstone National Park in late March 1995. A total of 66 wolves were released to the two areas in this manner in January 1995 and January 1996. Several wolves from the Northern Rockies have dispersed to the Southern Rockies but have failed to establish a population there. Most have been killed.

2013 estimates of wolf populations in the two recovery zones reflect the success the species has had in both areas:

- Greater Yellowstone Area: 460
- Central Idaho: 684

These numbers, added with the estimated number of wolves in northwestern Montana (500), puts the total number of wolves in the Northern U.S. Rocky Mountain recovery area at over 1500 individuals. This includes approximately 134 packs (two or more wolves traveling together) and 71 breeding pairs (male and female that successfully rear a litter of at least two until Dec. 31). The recovery goal for the area was 30 breeding pairs total, and this number has been surpassed for some time. In addition, there are at least 120 grey wolves in the Canadian Rockies.

The restoration of the gray wolf to the Yellowstone National Park not only restores an important ecosystem component (the wolf) and process (predation by wolves) to bring the park into better ecological balance, but it also is economically sound. After weighing the costs (including full reimbursement to ranchers for the loss of livestock) and benefits (increased revenues from hunting and tourism), economists estimated (before the actual restoration took place) a net $18 million return during the first year after the wolves were returned, and about $110 million in 20 years. More tourists are expected to visit the area of the Yellowstone National Park and to stay longer in hope of hearing or seeing wolves in the wild. Compensatory payments to ranchers for the loss of cattle and sheep to wolves averaged about $1,800 per year in northwestern Montana.

==== Mustelids ====
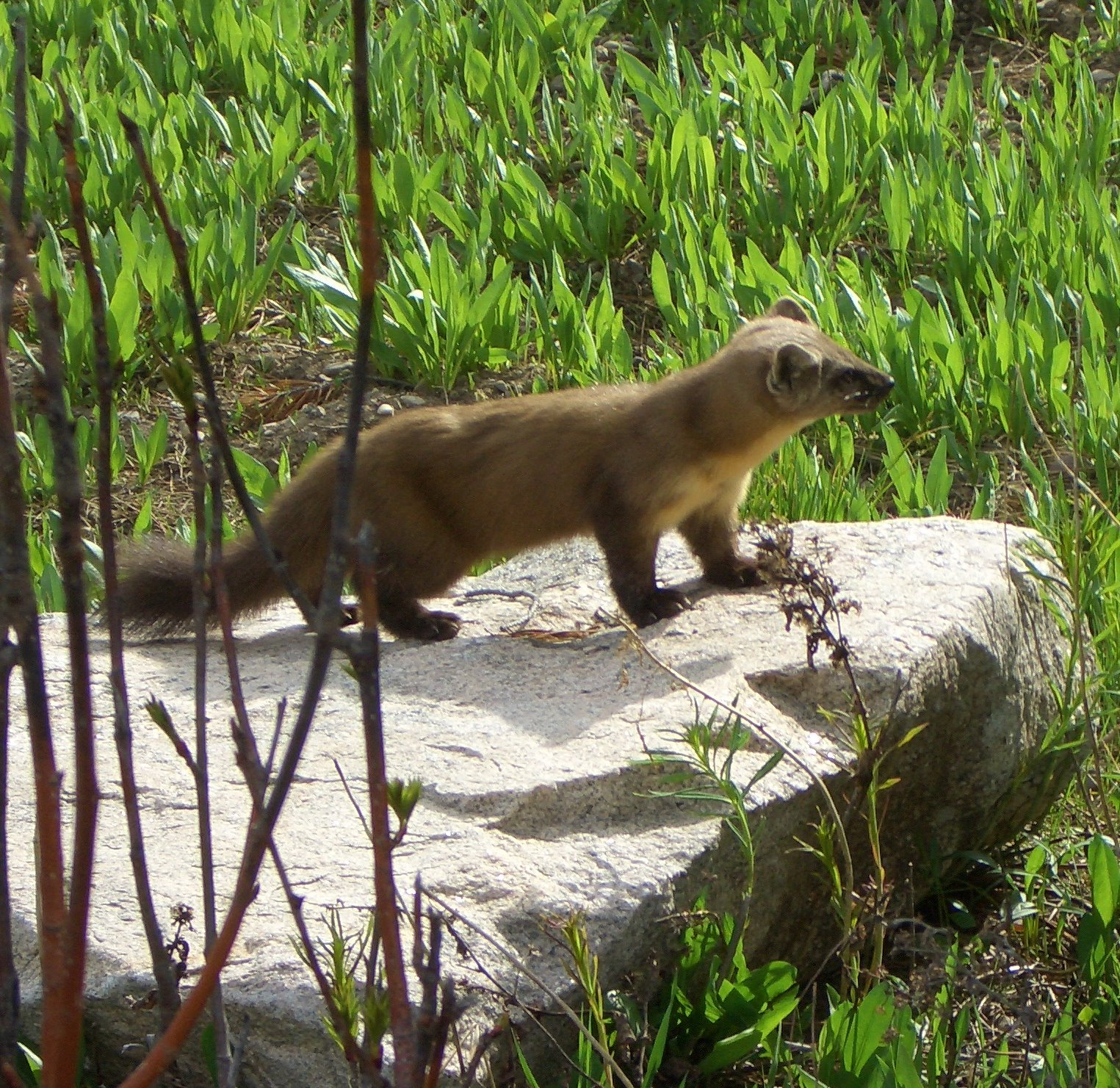
An American marten in Grand Teton National Park

Many types of mustelids inhabit the meadows, forests, and peaks of the Rocky Mountains. Types of weasels here include:

- Wolverine (Gulo gulo)
- American badger (Taxidea taxus)
- Northern river otter (Lontra canadensis)
- Pacific marten (Martes caurina)
- Fisher (Pekania pennanti)
- Long-tailed weasel (Neogale frenata)
- American mink (Neogale vison)
- Black-footed ferret (Mustela nigripes)
- American ermine (Mustela richardsonii)

Mustelids are some of the most important predators of squirrels, mice, and voles, although wolverines can take down an animal as large as a caribou and the primary food of river otters is fish. Several species, including the river otter, black-footed ferret, and wolverine, have declined over much of their range because of habitat loss, poisoning, and trapping, as well as decline in prey species.

==== Cervidae ====
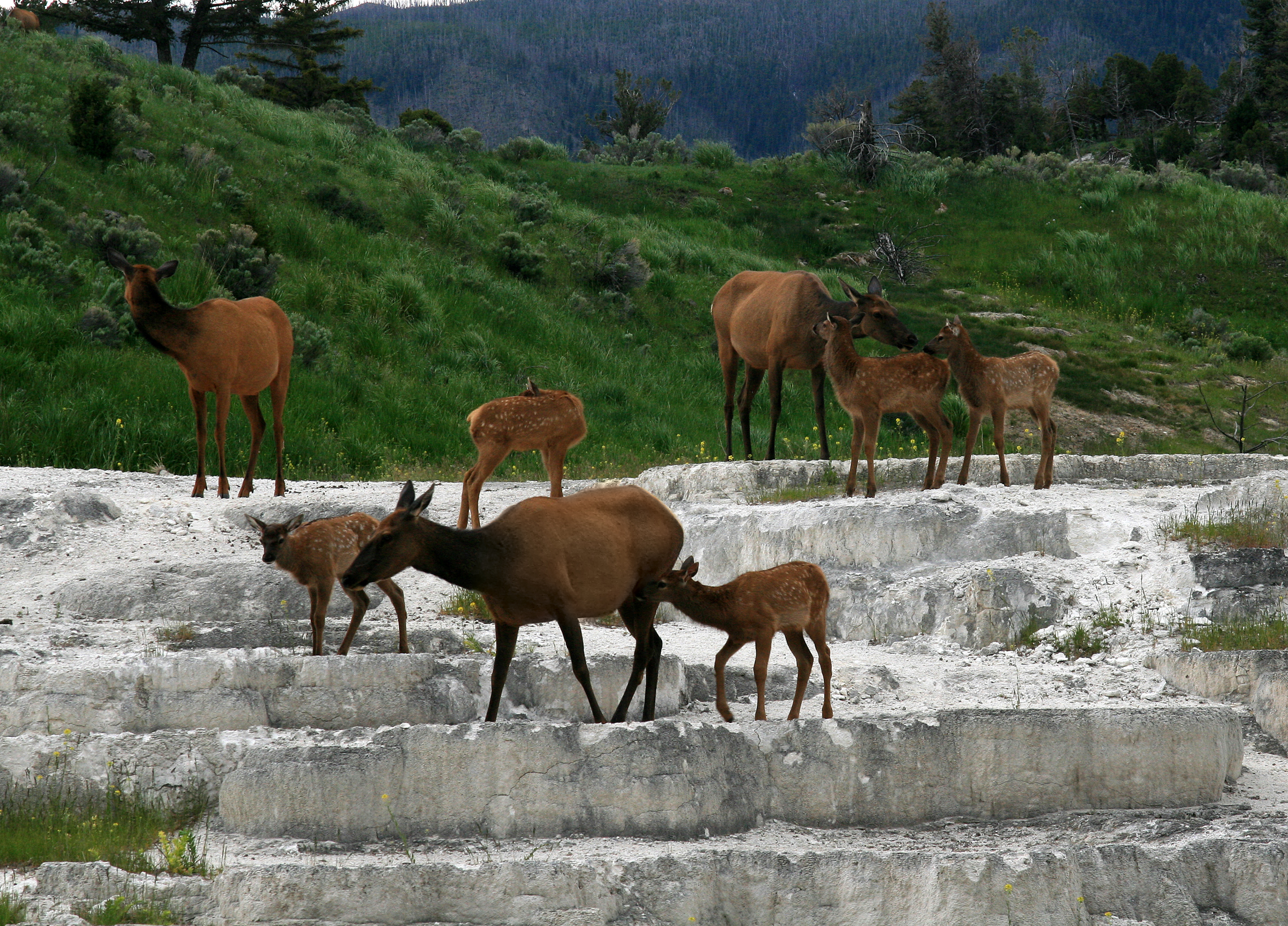
Elk at the Opal terrace at Mammoth Hot Springs, Yellowstone National Park

Members of the deer family (Cervidae) are relatively common in the Rocky Mountains, and include North American elk, mule deer, white-tailed deer, woodland caribou, and moose.

Population trends in North American elk and deer (mule deer and white-tailed deer combined) may be heading in opposite directions. The number of elk has increased steadily in Colorado and Wyoming, whereas the abundances of deer are showing signs of decline. Elk on U.S. Forest Service lands in the Rocky Mountains increased from 268,000 in 1965 to 372,000 in 1984. Similarly, the number of elk on Bureau of Land Management lands rose from 35,000 in 1966 to 114,000 in 1985. Meanwhile, the number of deer on U.S. Forest Service lands declined from 1,742,000 in 1965 to 1,197,000 in 1984. Deer populations also declined on Bureau of Land Management lands. Thus, in some areas in the last 20 years, the abundances of elk have increased by about 40%, whereas deer have decreased by about 30%. Possible reasons for the increase in elk populations include mild winters, range extension into lowlands and highlands, increased adaptability to human-modified landscapes, and lack of predation in spite of increased hunting. The causes of the deer population declines remain unknown but may include excessive harvest in the 1970s and habitat overlap with elk, intensifying competition for similar resources. Note, however, that deer population in the rest of the United States has increased fiftyfold between 1900 and 2005, as hunting has been limited and open space has been preserved.

Woodland caribou were historically found in most of the northern Rocky Mountains, possibly ranging as far south as Wyoming. They have declined dramatically over most of their range and have been eliminated in the Lower 48. Currently, populations are found in the Canadian Rockies, Alaska, and several other ranges. The primary cause for their decline is the logging of old-growth forests. British Columbia is attempting to reverse their decline by culling the province's abundant wolves.

Moose populations have increased 50% since 1980 in Wyoming and have been rapidly increasing since the reintroduction into Colorado beginning in 1978 and 1979. Colorado currently has a thriving population of approximately 2,500 moose. However, in Yellowstone National Park, moose have declined from 1,000 animals in the 1970s to 200 in 1996.

==== Pronghorn ====
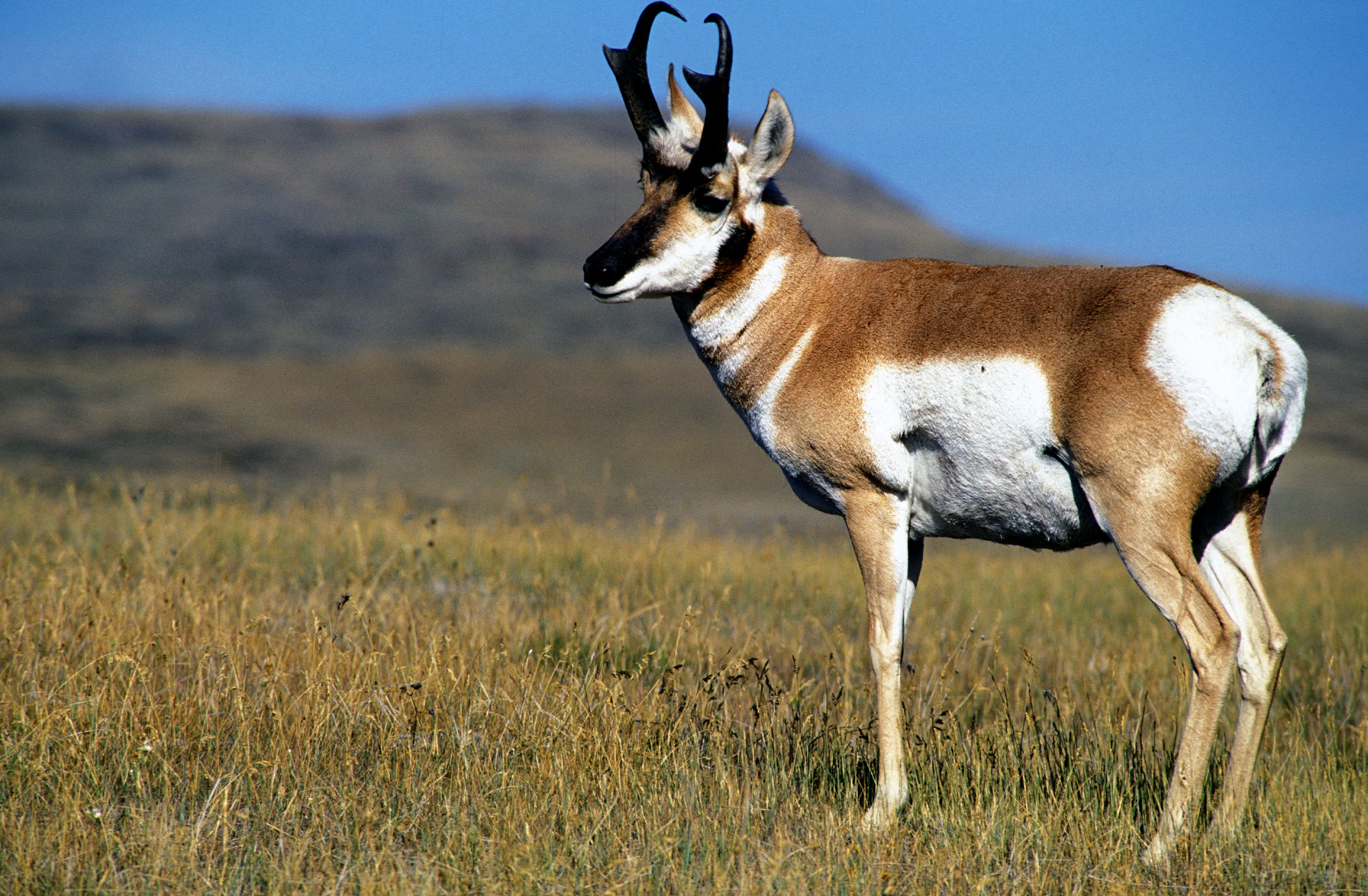
A pronghorn in Montana

Many areas of the Rocky Mountains, notably Yellowstone and Grand Teton national parks, have significant populations of pronghorn. Many of these are migratory. Grand Teton's population migrates all the way from the Green River Basin each year, through many developed areas. Efforts have been made to preserve its migration route.

==== Bighorn sheep ====
Populations of bighorn sheep are at only about 2% to 8% of their sizes at the time of European settlement. Causes for the rapid decline from 1870 through 1950 included unregulated harvesting, excessive grazing of livestock on rangelands, and diseases transmitted by domestic sheep. In recent years, more than 115 translocations were made to restore bighorn sheep into the Rocky Mountains and into many national parks. Only 39% of the 115 bighorn sheep translocations are persisting in 6 Rocky Mountain states. Populations of 100 or more sheep now occur in 10 national park units, populations of 100-200 sheep in 5 units, and populations of more than 500 sheep in 5 units. Populations of fewer than 100 animals exist in 5 other park units.

==== Bison ====
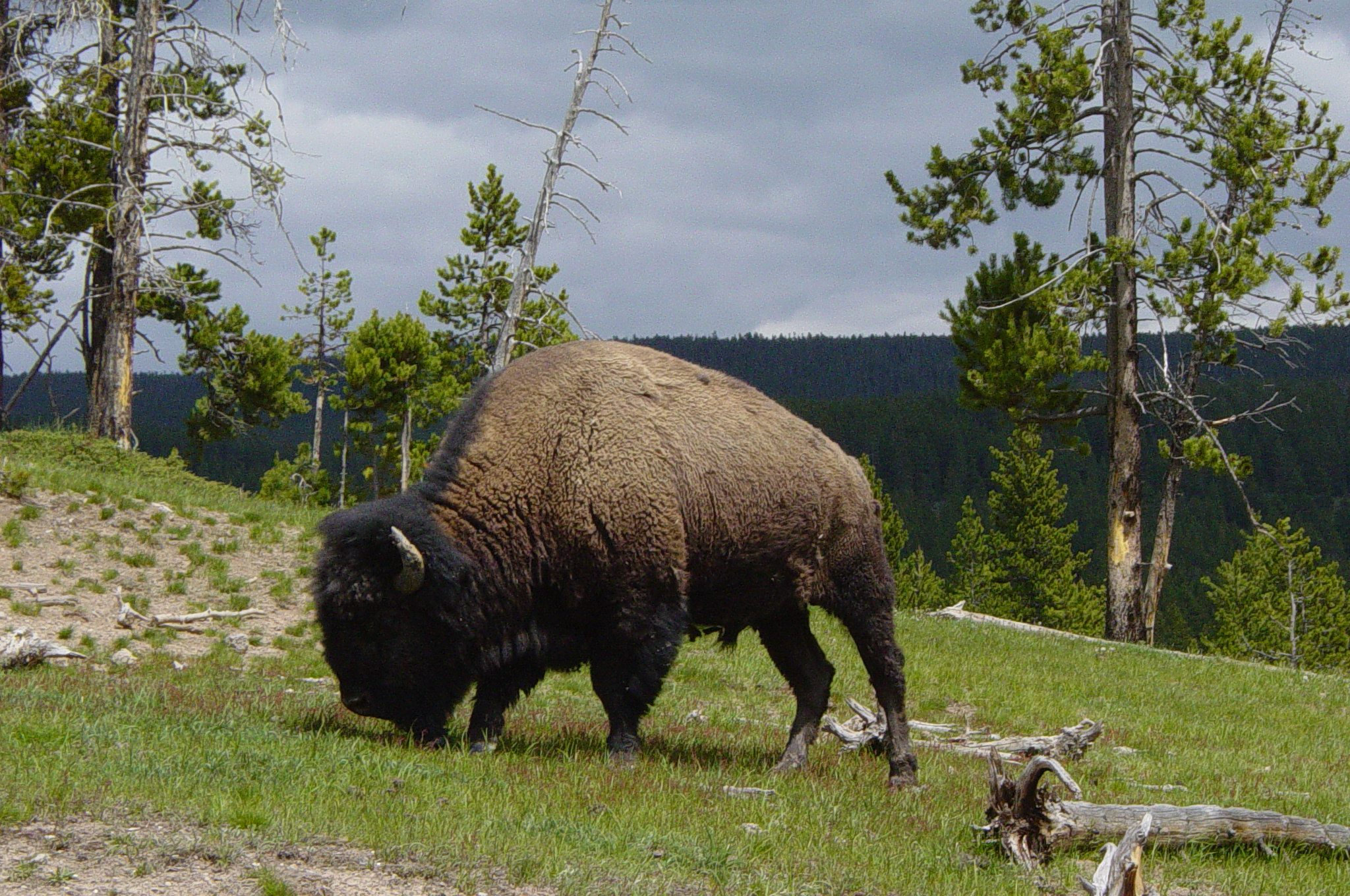
A bison near Yellowstone National Park's Mud Volcano area

In the 1800s, American bison throughout their range were exterminated to make room for livestock and drive Native Americans off the landscape, who depended heavily on bison. One of the few surviving genetically pure populations was in Yellowstone's Pelican Valley. The U.S. Army protected the bison until the National Park Service was established. There are currently between 4,000 and 5,000 bison in the park. There are also herds in Grand Teton National Park, along Colorado's Front Range, in the San Luis Valley, and on Montana's CSKT Bison Range. Herds are being established near Glacier National Park and in Alberta's Banff National Park. Bison are a keystone species because their grazing and wallowing patterns create more diverse grasslands and meadows.

==== Beaver ====
Beavers once played important roles in shaping vegetation patterns in riparian and meadow communities in the Rocky Mountains. Studies of beaver populations in one small area in Yellowstone National Park (Tower Junction area) in the early 1920s reported 232 beavers and extensive beaver dams. Repeated surveys in the same area in the early 1950s and in 1986 revealed no beavers or dams. Beavers need aspens or tall willows for food and building materials—resources that are made scarce by lack of both fires and floods and by herbivory by elk, moose, and domestic livestock. Beaver ponds are known to maintain fish and invertebrate populations and to create and maintain riparian zones that are critical to wildlife, yet the beaver is virtually absent in many areas. By 2015, Yellowstone had an estimated 100 colonies. Causes for their increase include predation of elk by wolves, which allowed aspens and willows to grow taller.

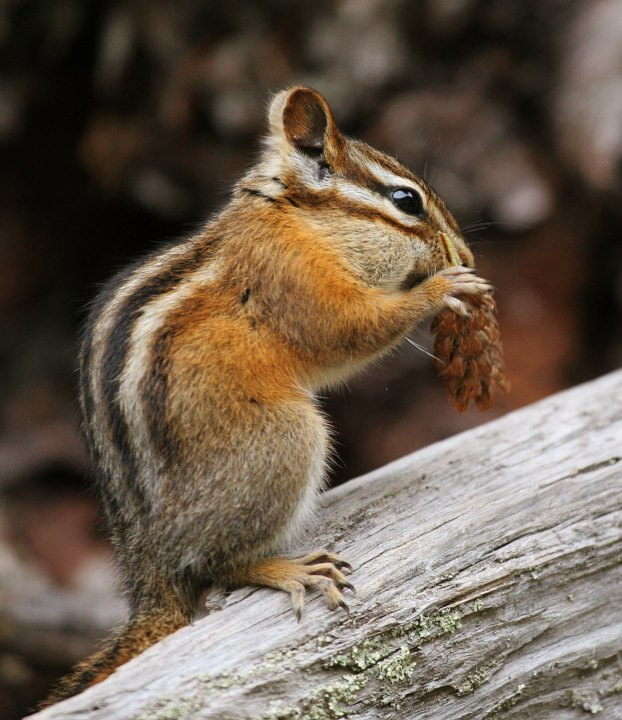
A least chipmunk in Glacier National Park

==== Squirrels ====
Many types of squirrel inhabit the forests of the Rocky Mountains, including several species of chipmunks such as the Uinta chipmunk and the least chipmunk. Overwinter chipmunk survival rates are less than a third. Tree squirrels include the American red squirrel (also known as pine squirrel), and the Abert's squirrel, found only in ponderosa pine forests. There are also several types of ground squirrels, such as the Wyoming ground squirrel, the rock squirrel, and the golden-mantled ground squirrel. Squirrels are important to the forest because they help spread the seeds of many plants. They are also a major food source for predators like martens, weasels, and hawks.
