= O. P. Schnabel Park =

Park in San Antonio, Texas

- Interactive map of O. P. Schnabel Park
- Type: Public park
- Location: San Antonio, Texas
- Coordinates: 29°32′8.35″N 98°38′27.23″W
- Area: 202-acre (0.82 km^{2})
- Created: 1964

O. P. Schnabel Park is a 202-acre (0.82 km^{2}) city park in the City of San Antonio, Texas (located at 9600 Bandera Road). The park includes buildings for the YMCA program, ball fields, a basketball court, and several trails. Formerly known as Bandera Road Park, the park was named O.P. Schnabel Park in 1977.

== History ==
The park land was purchased by the city of San Antonio in 1964. It was originally simply named 'Bandera Road Park'. Throughout the park there are oak trees and mountain laurels.

The park was renamed after O.P. Schnabel in 1977, known in the area for his efforts to improve the visual appeal of San Antonio through several "clean-up and beautification campaigns". The park is sometimes referred to as "the cleanest little park in Texas".

== Facilities ==
The park has water fountains, restrooms, picnic areas, pavilions, and a basketball court. There are also 4.5 miles of trails which can be used for jogging, hiking, or biking. Trail markers indicate level of difficulty and accessibility. Pets on leashes are allowed. At least two walking trails are wheelchair accessible. The park has a playground along with some seating areas near it with pergolas.
