= Charles Schnabel =

American biochemist

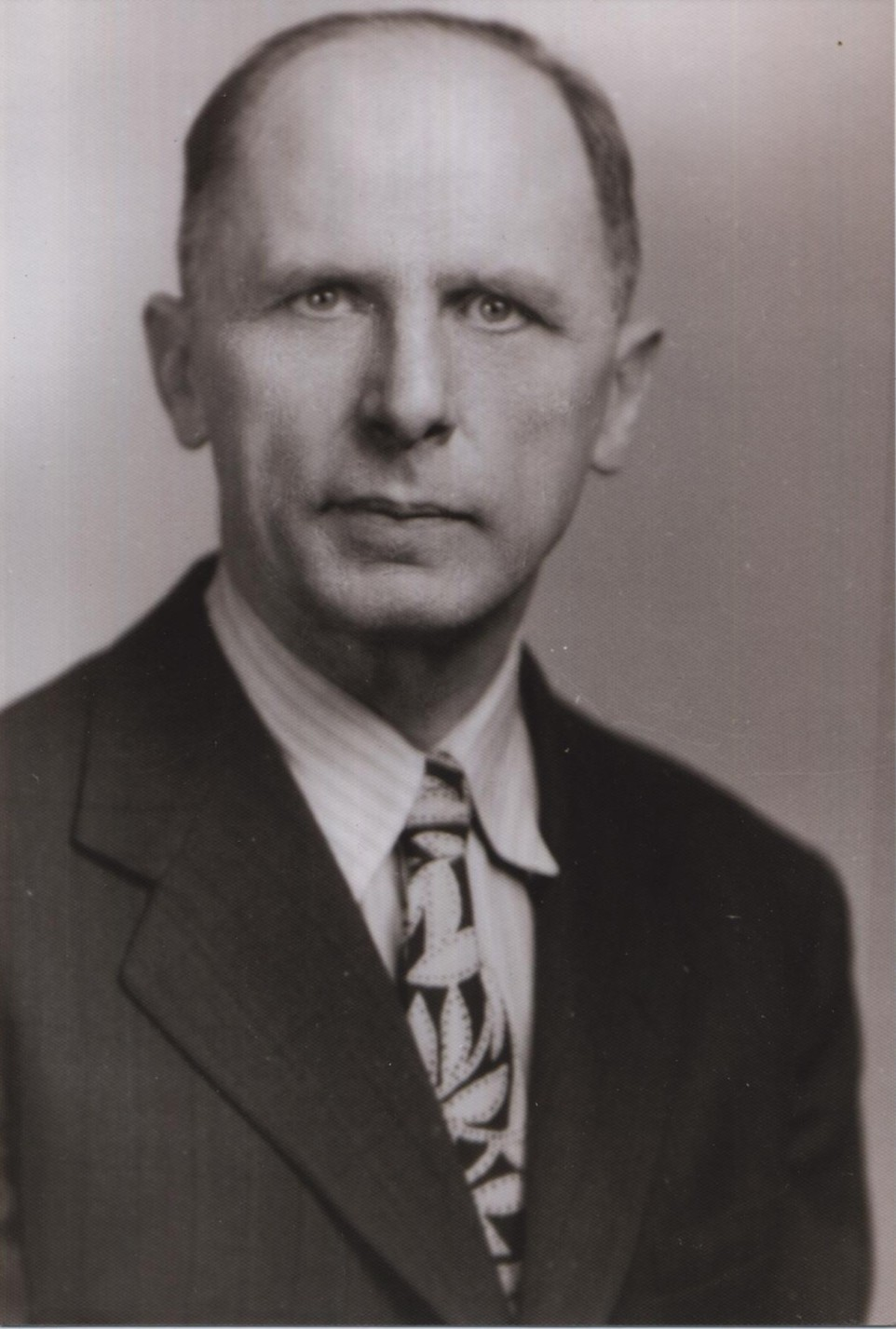
- Born: 1895; Ionia, Missouri
- Died: 1974 (aged 78–79)
- Education: University of Missouri
- Known for: "The father of wheatgrass"
- Scientific career
- Fields: Agricultural chemistry
- Workplaces: Standard Milling Company

Charles Franklin Schnabel (1895–1974) was an American agricultural chemist who became known as the father of wheatgrass. Schnabel opened the door to scientific research on cereal grass. After Schnabel's initial work in the mid-1920s that showed chickens nearly tripled their winter egg production when a small amount of cereal grass was added to their diet, he went on to find benefits with nearly every kind of livestock. His research documented larger litters, richer milk, more milk, less infant mortality, better fur and improved general health when a small amount of dehydrated cereal grass was added to the animal's food ration. In 1970, he accurately predicted that, due to its climate similar to Johannesburg, "San Diego will be the wheat grass capital of the United States."

== Life ==
Charles Schnabel was born in Ionia, Missouri, in 1895. He graduated from the University of Missouri in Columbia, Missouri, with a Bachelor of Science degree in 1918 at which time he was also granted a lifetime teaching certificate in vocational agriculture and chemistry. He taught at the high school level in Excelsior Springs, Missouri, from 1920 to 1922. From 1922 to 1928, Schnabel was a chemist for Standard Milling Company, Kansas City, where he first began his research into the proteins of leafy green vegetables and cereal grasses. Schnabel's discovery of the nutritional value of grasses as a food occurred in 1931 which led to his first patent application in 1933. By 1935 he was a research chemist for the company he founded, Cerophyl Laboratories, where he stayed for the remainder of his career.

== Wheat grass ==
On April 15, 1933, Charles F. Schnabel, a former feed mill chemist, applied for a patent for a 'feed' product that he developed for both animal and human consumption. The patent was for processing young grass shoots from wheat, barley and rye crops as a dietary supplement that provided unique health benefits from the chlorophyll. Schnabel studied many aspects of growth and nutrition associated with cereal grasses. He found that some soils were not suitable for providing high quality cereal grasses, and that the nutrients provided by these green plants varied with the stage of growth of the grasses. He gave the dehydrated grasses, an economical and practical food supplement, to his family of seven. As reported in the Buffalo Courier Express, none of his children ever had a serious illness or a decayed tooth.

In order to make this food available to more people, Schnabel started Cerophyl Laboratories in the 1930s. Cerophyl was a company that produced what some called "the world's first multivitamin." At about the same time Schnabel was documenting the nutritional and health benefits of dehydrated cereal grass for both animals and humans, vitamins were being discovered. Schnabel applied these new vitamin analysis protocols to dehydrated cereal grass harvested at the jointing stage. Charles Schnabel's wheatgrass was wholefood powder, grown slowly in cold weather, and was used in an extensive body of both animal and human medical research. Schnabel did not grow his wheatgrass indoors and did not use juice, but rather the dried wholefood powder.

Schnabel explained how he had begun experimenting with the nutritive value of young grass shoots from wheat and barley. Once the shoots began "jointing," their nutritional value began to dissipate as the plant reserved all of its food value to send into forming the seed kernels. Schnabel continued to explain that he was looking for a way to preserve the nutritional value of the young grasses to increase their shelf life. In 1935 Schnabel, then an employee of American Dairies, approached Lynwood Smith to request the use of an unused drying machine. When Smith asked Schnabel why he wanted to use the machine Schnabel answered "…to dry grasses." His answer led to a three-hour discussion in Smith's office. His experiments had indicated that the young grass shoots had to be dried quickly, which was the reason behind his request for the unused drying machine. This is the key finding that separates wheat grass grown and harvested at the jointing stage from cereal grasses grown in trays indoors or harvested at any other time in the growing process. The jointing process is why Schnabel's wheat grass was superior in terms of total nutritional value. This still holds true today.

Through his research and experiments, Schnabel found that in nearly every case, cereal grass contained a higher level of vitamins than other foods. With all the discoveries, people were clamoring for a way to increase the vitamins in their diets. Schnabel's Cerophyl was the answer. With the recommended 20 tablets per day, people could receive their minimum daily requirements of most of the known vitamins.

Cerophyl's market took off immediately. Nearly every pharmacy in the United States carried the product. Due to the onslaught of articles in medical journals and the FDA's approval as a food, doctors routinely recommended Cerophyl to their patients. It also had a growing international market. Several dehydrating facilities in Northeast Kansas were working at maximum capacity, harvesting thousands of acres of cereal grass at the jointing stage to keep up with the demand. Cerophyl became a popular brand name for two decades.

In the 1950s, the widespread popularity of Cerophyl started to wane with the introduction of One-A-Day Vitamins. It was an era that lauded "the miracles of modern science." People reasoned that it was better to take one tablet of synthetic vitamins per day than to obtain their vitamins from a natural source by taking twenty Cerophyl tablets. Although the first use of Cerophyl for both human and animal consumption occurred in August 1937, it was not trademarked years later. The popularity of Cerophyl gave way to synthetic vitamins that people thought were better and more convenient. Schnabel developed a version of Cerophyl, fortified with synthetic vitamins, so the consumer could reduce the daily requirement from twenty tablets to four, but this second product had limited success. Although Cerophyl continued to be sold on a limited basis, it was not until 1976 that the use of cereal grass as a human food began to increase again.

He also tested cereal grass at every stage of growth and determined the highest level of nutrition was achieved just prior to and at the jointing stage. He developed a dehydration method that captured that high nutritional level. His research led directly to dozens of dehydration facilities in every state where cereal grains and alfalfa are grown. These facilities have produced millions of tons of cereal grass and alfalfa for both human and animal consumption. Many are still in operation.

Over the last 75 years, facilities based on Schnabel's research have produced billions of dollars in animal feeds as well as billions in human food supplements. These facilities are being used exclusively for drying cereal grass and alfalfa for human consumption. Other companies also have dehydration facilities used for cereal grass as a food or as a nutrient-dense ingredient in foods.
