= Wheatgrass =

Freshly sprouted first leaves of the common wheat plant

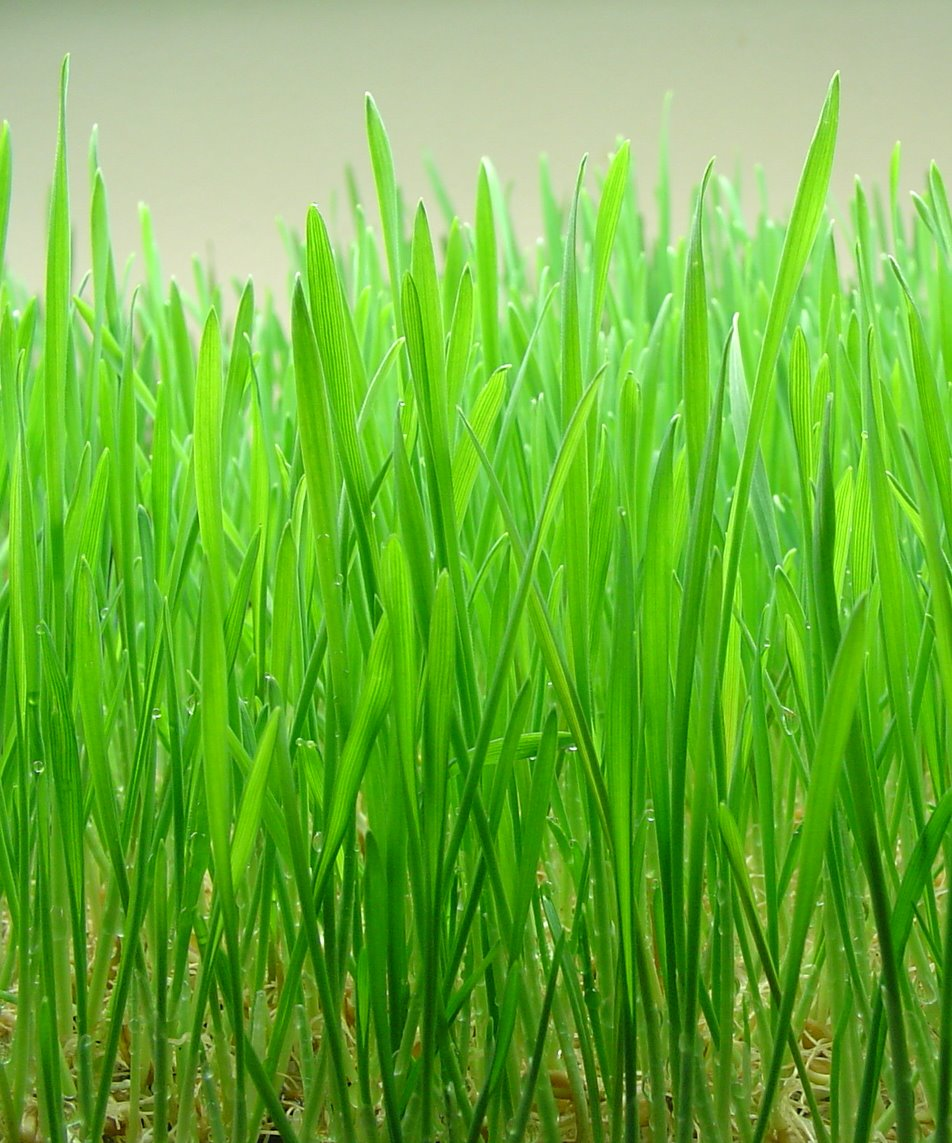
Indoor-grown wheatgrass 8–10 days before harvest.

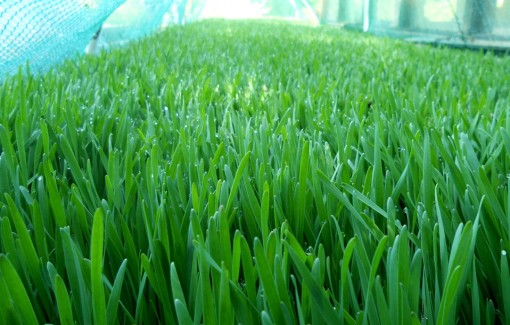
Spelt grass grown outdoors. With a deeper green color than wheat.

Wheatgrass is the freshly sprouted first leaves of the common wheat plant (Triticum aestivum), used as a food, drink, or dietary supplement. Wheatgrass is served freeze dried or fresh, and so it differs from wheat malt, which is convectively dried. Wheatgrass is allowed to grow longer and taller than wheat malt.

Like most plants, wheatgrass contains chlorophyll, amino acids, minerals, vitamins and antioxidant enzymes. Claims about the health benefits of wheatgrass range from providing supplemental nutrition, anti-inflammatory effects, anti-oxiditative effects to having unique curative properties, but there is no good scientific evidence to support these uses.

== History ==
The consumption of wheatgrass in the Western world began in the 1930s as a result of experiments conducted by Charles Schnabel in his attempts to popularize the plant. By 1940, cans of Schnabel's powdered grass were on sale in major drug stores throughout the United States and Canada.

Ann Wigmore was also a strong advocate for the consumption of wheatgrass as a part of a raw food diet. Wigmore, founder of the Hippocrates Health Institute, believed that wheatgrass, as a part of a raw food diet, would cleanse the body of toxins while providing a proper balance of nutrients as a whole food. She also taught that wheatgrass could be used to treat those with serious disease. Both of these claims are believed by many reputable health institutes to be entirely unfounded by facts, and possibly dangerous.

== Cultivation ==
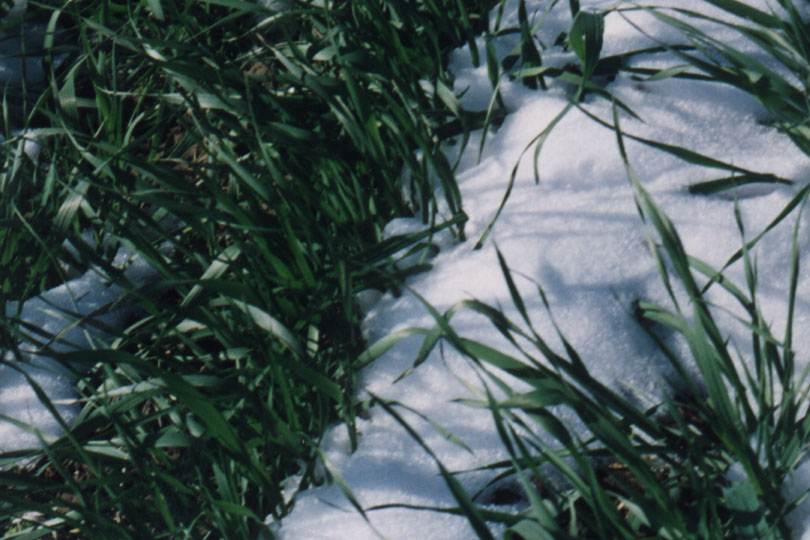
Outdoor-grown wheatgrass grows slowly through the winter in a climate like that of Kansas in the United States.

Wheatgrass can be grown indoors or outdoors. A common method for sprout production indoors is often on trays in a growth medium such as a potting mix. Leaves are harvested when they develop a "split" as another leaf emerges. These can then be cut off with scissors and allow a second crop of shoots to form. Sometimes a third cutting is possible, but may be tougher and have fewer sugars than the first.

Schnabel's research was conducted with wheatgrass grown outdoors in Kansas. His wheatgrass required 200 days of slow growth through the winter and early spring, when it was harvested at the jointing stage. He claimed that at this stage the plant reached its peak nutritional value; after jointing, concentrations of chlorophyll, protein, and vitamins decline sharply. Wheatgrass is harvested, freeze-dried, then sold in tablet and powdered concentrates for human and animal consumption. Indoor-grown wheatgrass is used to make wheatgrass juice powder.

== Nutrition and health claims ==
Nutrient comparison of 1 oz (28.35 g) of wheatgrass juice, broccoli and spinach.
Nutrient	Wheatgrass juice	Broccoli	Spinach
Protein	860 mg	800 mg	810 mg
Beta-carotene	120 IU	177 IU	2658 IU
Vitamin E	2900 mcg	220 mcg	580 mcg
Vitamin C	1 mg	25.3 mg	8 mg
Vitamin B_{12}	0.30 mcg	0 mcg	0 mcg
Phosphorus	21 mg	19 mg	14 mg
Magnesium	8 mg	6 mg	22 mg
Calcium	7.2 mg	13 mg	28 mg
Iron	0.66 mg	0.21 mg	0.77 mg
Potassium	42 mg	90 mg	158 mg
Data on broccoli and spinach from USDA database. Data on wheatgrass juice from indoor grown wheatgrass.

Proponents of wheatgrass make many claims for its health properties, ranging from promotion of general well-being to cancer prevention. However, according to the American Cancer Society, "available scientific evidence does not support the idea that wheatgrass or the wheatgrass diet can cure or prevent disease".

Several trials and clinical reports report benefits in specific conditions e.g., reduced transfusion needs in thalassemia, reduced some chemotherapy side effects, improvements in some inflammatory bowel disease metrics, or modest antioxidant marker changes. However, the trials are generally small, often short. Top reviews advise cautious interpretation and call for larger, better-designed trials.

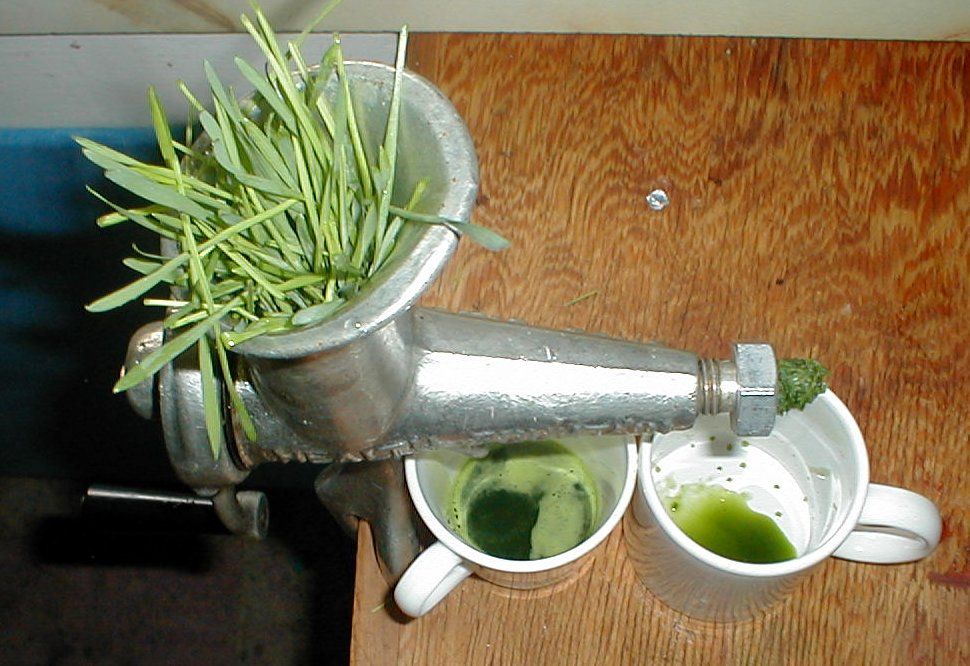
Extracting wheatgrass juice with a manual juicing machine.

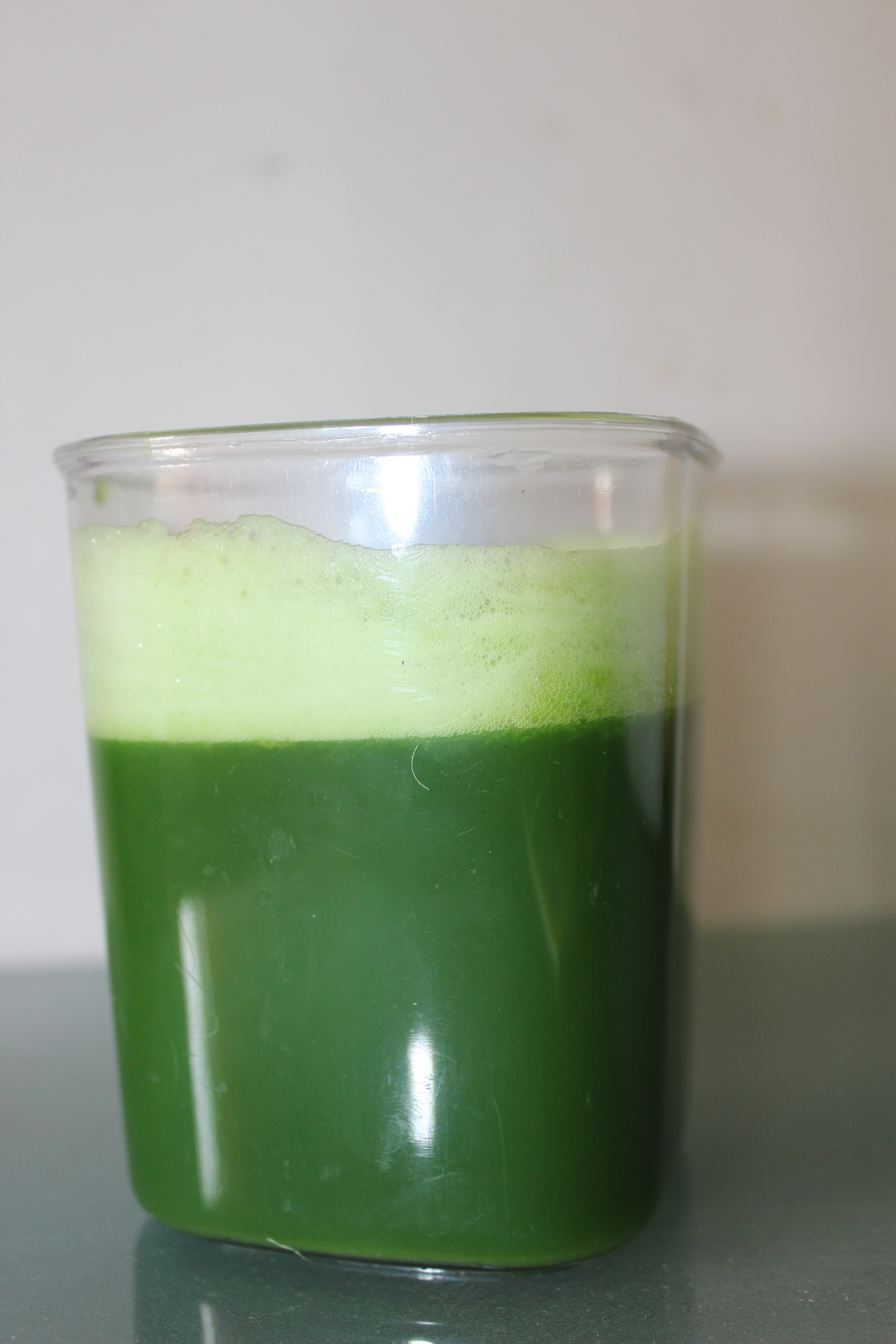
Wheatgrass juice

=== Nutritional content ===
Wheatgrass is a source of potassium, dietary fiber, vitamin A, vitamin C, vitamin E (alpha tocopherol), vitamin K, thiamin, riboflavin, niacin, vitamin B6, pantothenic acid, iron, zinc, copper, manganese, and selenium. It is also a source of protein, with 8 grams per ounce if consumed in powder form or around 1 g in a "shot" of juice. This protein content consists of at least 17 forms of amino acids, including eight out of nine essential amino acids. As per in vitro study, wheatgrass juice is nutritionally superior to other fruit and vegetable juices, with higher bioavailable minerals and antioxidant compounds. Its addition to other juices markedly improves their overall nutritional quality.

Vitamin B_{12} is not contained within wheatgrass or any vegetable, as vitamin B_{12} is not made by plants; rather it is a byproduct of the microorganisms living on plants or in the surrounding soil. There are some claims that analysis of wheatgrass have found B_{12} in negligible amounts; however, there are no reliable sources cited to back up the claim. An analysis of wheat grass by the USDA National Nutrient Database reports that wheatgrass contains no vitamin B_{12}.

=== Preparation ===
Wheatgrass juice is cold-pressed from 7–9-day-old shoots, harvested before jointing, when chlorophyll, antioxidant enzymes, vitamin C, and phenolics peak. The grass should be washed with potable water, cold-pressed not blended or heated, and consumed within 10–15 minutes to avoid oxidation and enzyme loss. Heat, boiling, spray-drying, and high-speed blending are consistently discouraged due to chlorophyll degradation. When fresh juice is impractical, frozen fresh juice or low-temperature (<40 °C) dehydrated powder is acceptable with partial nutrient retention. Studies stress hygienic cultivation, pesticide-free medium, microbial and heavy-metal testing for safety. Wheatgrass juice is often available at juice bars, and some people grow and juice their own in their homes. It is available fresh as produce, in tablets, frozen juice, and powder. Wheatgrass is also sold commercially as a spray, cream, gel, massage lotion, and liquid herbal supplement.

== Pets ==
Wheatgrass is also cultivated for feeding to pet cats. Wheatgrass, along with shoots of other common grains such as oats, rye and barley, is sold for this purpose, including under the name cat grass. Many cats enjoy eating grass and wheatgrass is considered safe and healthy for them. It may provide nutrients and improve digestion by adding fiber to the diet. Eating wheatgrass may also provide mental stimulation. However, it is recommended to limit the quantity allowed, to avoid indigestion.

== See also ==
- Wheat sprout
- List of juices
