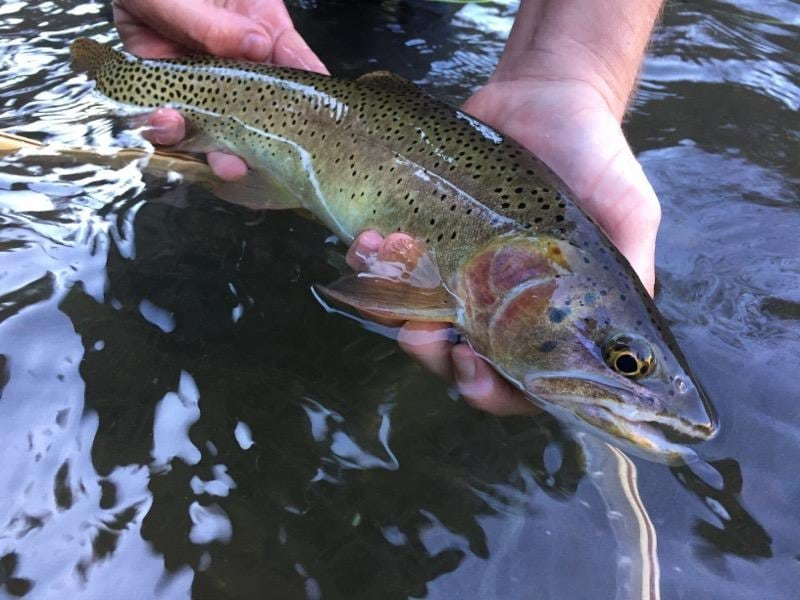

Scientific classification
- Kingdom: Animalia
- Phylum: Chordata
- Class: Actinopterygii
- Division: Teleostei
- Order: Salmoniformes
- Family: Salmonidae
- Genus: Oncorhynchus
- Species: O. virginalis
- Subspecies: O. v. ssp

Trinomial name
- Oncorhynchus virginalis ssp

= Bear River cutthroat trout =

Putative fish subspecies

Bear River cutthroat trout (Oncorhynchus virginalis ssp.) is an unofficially recognized subspecies of Rocky Mountain cutthroat trout native to the Bear River watershed in Utah, Idaho, and Wyoming. Currently, the subspecies is classified as Bonneville cutthroat trout owing to the shared presence in the Bonneville basin. However, research shows that Bear River cutthroat's are genetically distinct from Bonneville cutthroat trout and are more closely related to Yellowstone cutthroat trout Given these findings, a 2018 American Fisheries Society panel recognized Bear River cutthroat's as warranting designation as subspecies separate from Bonneville cutthroat trout, but a formal proposal to the Integrated Taxonomic Information System has not been made yet.

== Natural history ==
The Bear River cutthroat's origin is the result of complex geological history along the shifting margins of the Great Basin and the Snake River watersheds in southeastern Idaho. The Bear River was historically a tributary to the Snake River, which flowed along the course currently occupied by the Portneuf River. During this connection with the snake river, the ancestral Yellowstone cutthroat trout which, occupies the snake river watershed, were also present within the Bear River watershed. However, roughly 500,000 years ago, basalt flows blocked the ancestral path of the Bear River near Soda Springs in the Gem Valley-Blackfoot lava field, rerouting the river into the historical Lake Thatcher in southern Gem Valley, Idaho, beginning a period of isolation of the ancestral Bear River cutthroat from the greater Yellowstone cutthroat trout populations. 140,000 years ago, volcanic activity again reconnected the Bear River back into the Snake River watershed, only to be avulsed again into Lake Thatcher's watershed 90,000 years afterwards. During this period, Lake Thatcher began to spill over and erode a low divide between the Bear River Mountains and the Portneuf Range, beginning the erosion of the Oneida Narrows Canyon. Around 20,000 years ago, the incision through Oneida Narrow Canyon was completed, setting the Bear River in its current course into the Bonneville Basin. These periods of connection and isolation resulted in the distinct Bear River cutthroat trout

== Management and ecology ==
Given the Bear River cutthroat's genetic distinction from Bonneville Cutthroat, state management agencies classify Bear River cutthroat trout as distinct from Bonneville Cutthroat trout and refrain from stocking Bonneville cutthroat trout within the Bear River watershed. However, Bear River cutthroat have not yet been formally recognized as a distinct subspecies

Like other cutthroat trout subspecies, the Bear River cutthroat trout suffered from declines in population from a variety of causes including competition and predation from non-native species, hybridization with non-native Salmonids, habitat alteration, fragmentation, and entrainment associated with water development. However, ongoing restoration projects have had success in recovering lost populations, and naturally produced fish now compose 70% of the Bear Lake population, up from 5% in 2001.

The Bear Lake cutthroat trout are highly piscivorous and are the historical apex predator in Bear Lake. The Bear Lake cutthroat trout is one of only a few salmon species known to gain weight over the winter at temperatures that would typically stall growth. This is hypothesized to be an adaptation to allow the Bear River cutthroat to take advantage of Bonnevile cisco (Prosopium gemmifer) winter spawning aggregations.
