= Pahvant Butte =

Geographic feature in Utah, United States

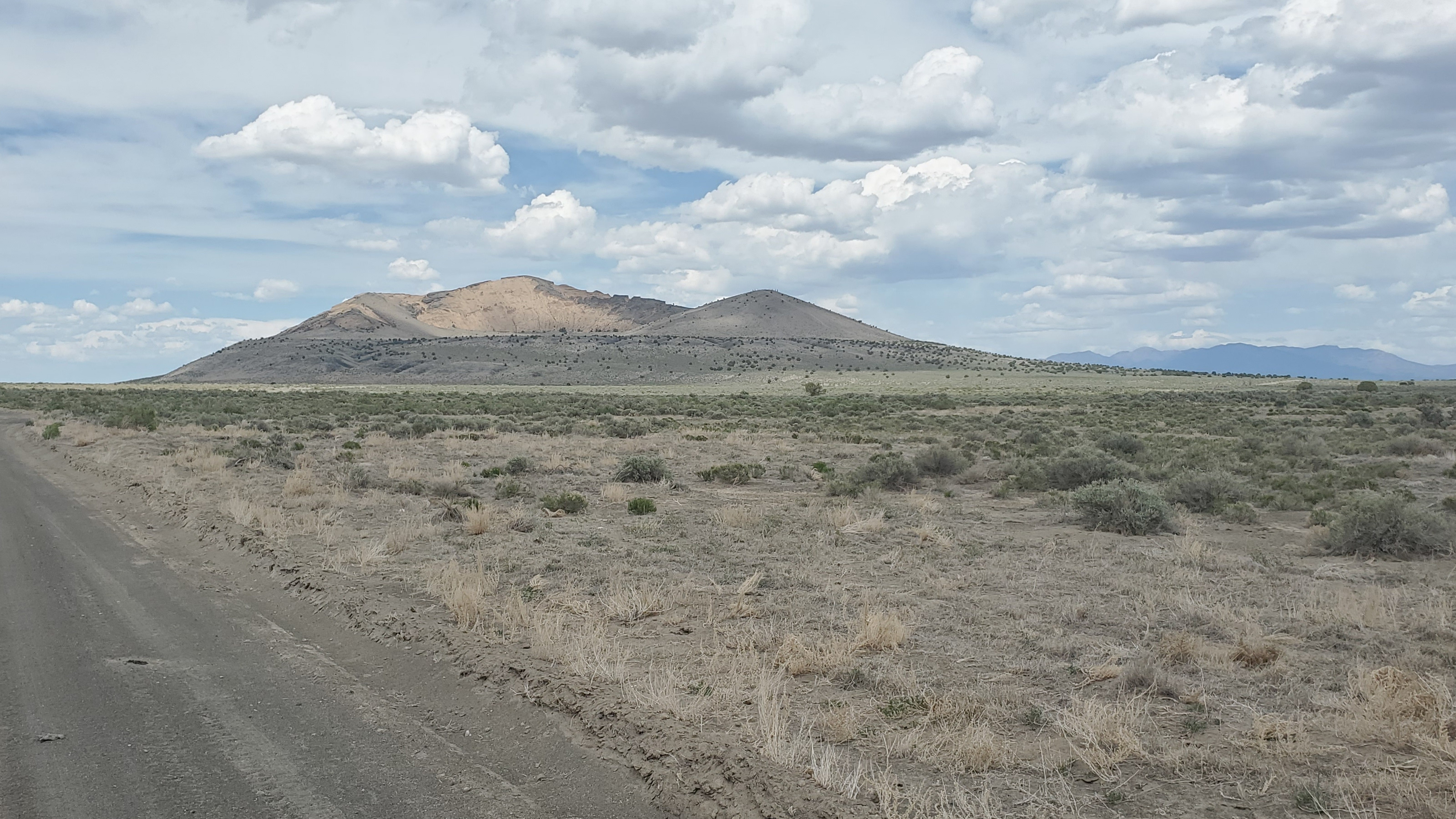
- Pahvant Butte, 2021

Geography
- Location within Utah
- Country: United States
- State: Utah
- Region: Black Rock Desert volcanic field
- District: Millard County
- Range coordinates: 39°07′54″N 112°33′08″W
- Topo map(s): USGS Pahvant Butte North, Utah and Pahvant Butte South, Utah

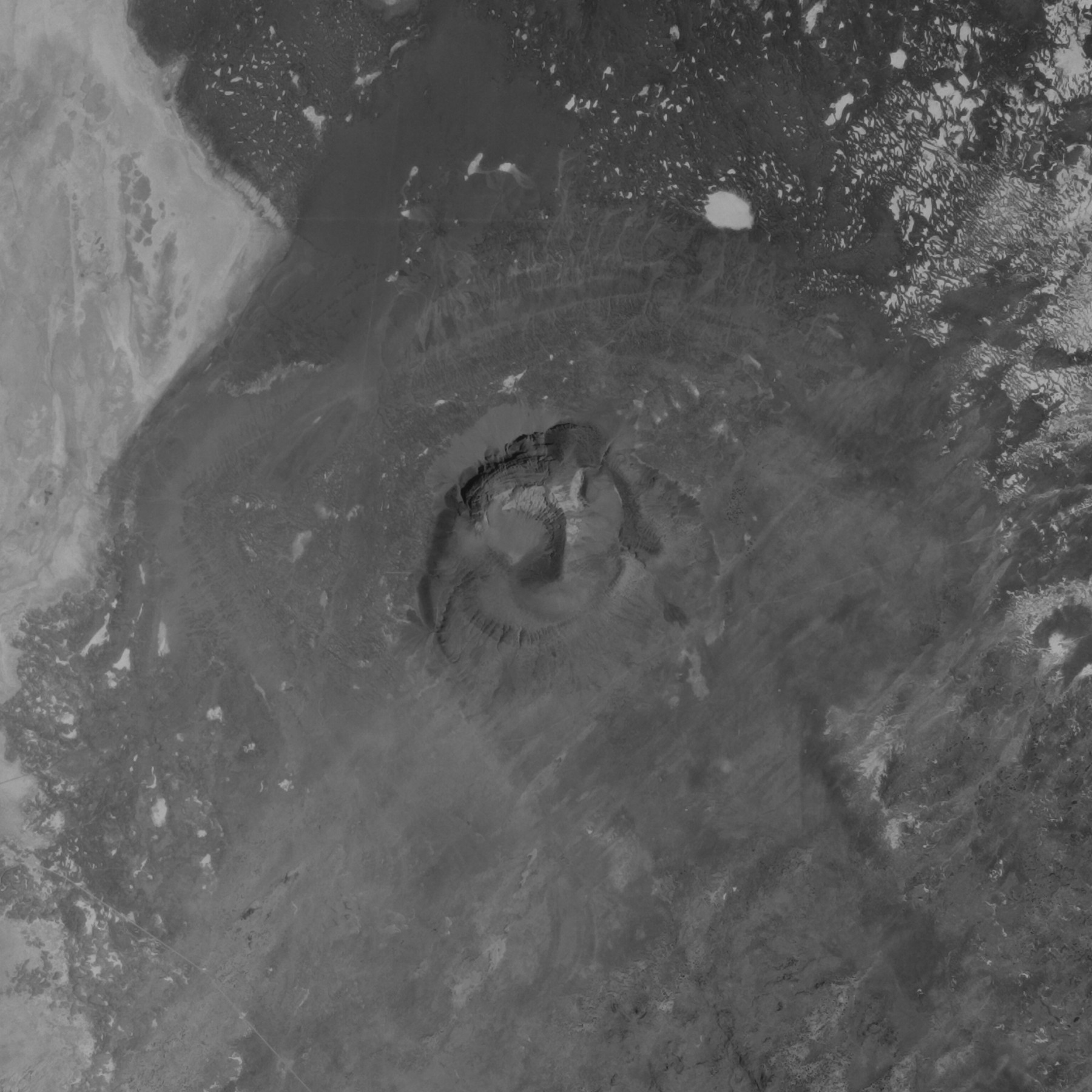
Air photo of Pahvant Butte in 1978

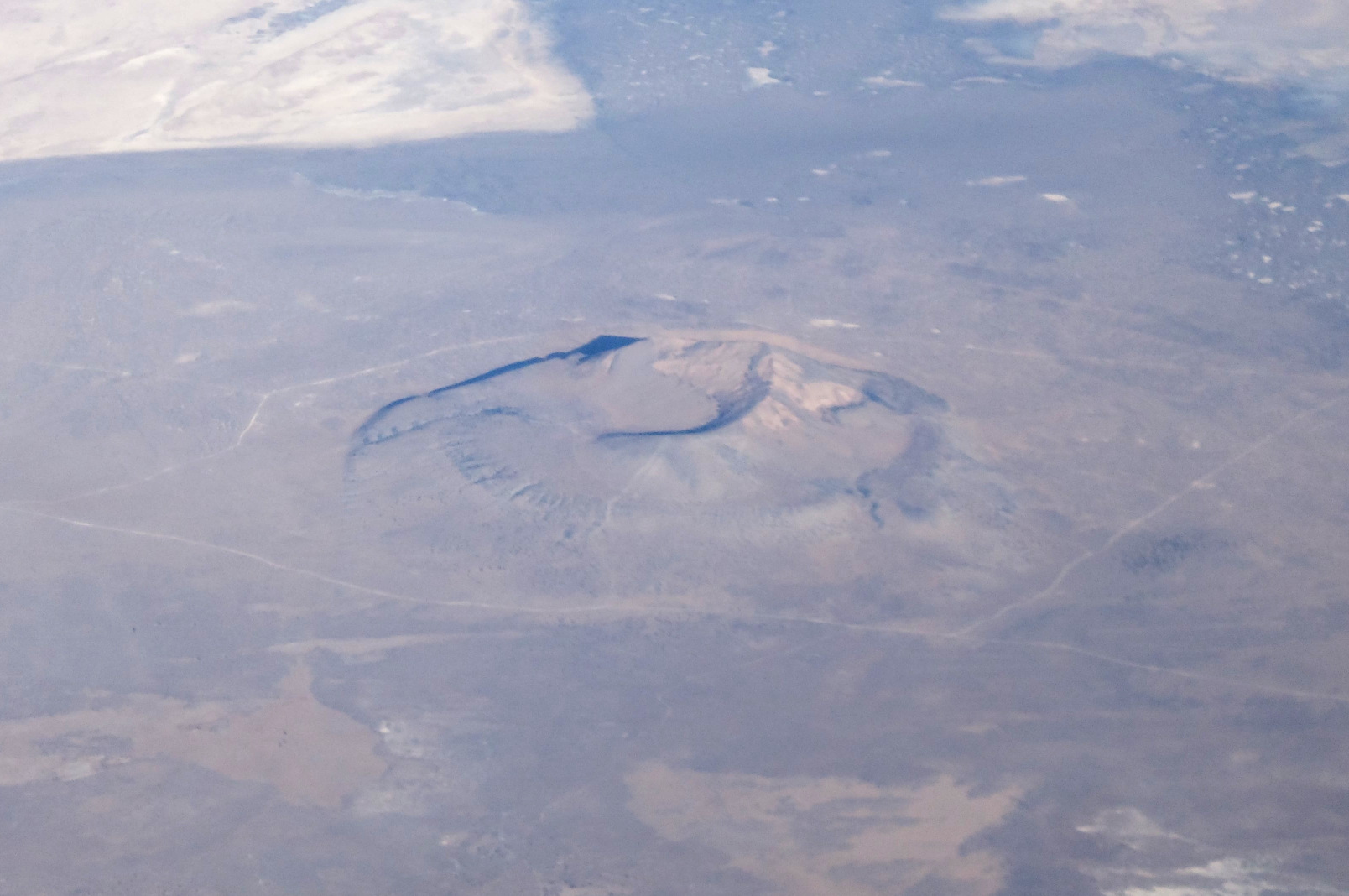
Oblique air photo, 2020

Pahvant Butte (also Pavant Butte) is a tuff cone volcano in the west-central portion of Utah, United States.

== Description ==
The butte, sometimes called "Sugarloaf Mountain" by locals, is located in the Sevier Desert in the Pahvant Valley 15.7 miles (25.3 km) south of Delta and five miles east of Clear Lake and the Clear Lake Wildlife Management Area.

The butte has two peaks. The north peak has an elevation of 5,751 ft (1,753 m) and the south peak reaches 5,486 ft (1,672 m). The peaks are about 1000 feet above the surrounding valley floor. The butte is about 1.5 mi (2.4 km) in diameter at the base.

It formed in an active area of volcanism on top of pahoehoe and aa lavas. Originally a subaqueous volcano, it erupted out of the floor of Lake Bonneville approximately 15,500 years ago.

== Unusual Structure ==
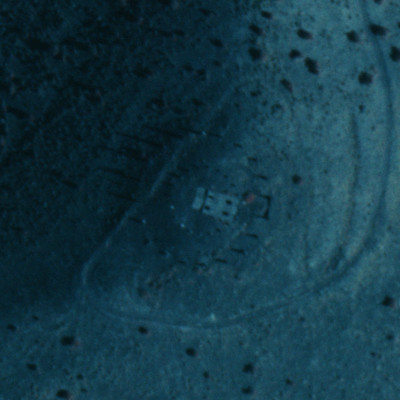
Ring structure in 1974. The outer ring is about 55 m in diameter.

Along the southeast rim of the inner depression of the volcano is an unfinished structure consisting of a concrete building embedded in the hill surrounded by two rings of concrete obelisks. The structure was apparently begun by a man named A. H. Hood, with the intention of generating wind power, in 1923.

== Geography and geology ==
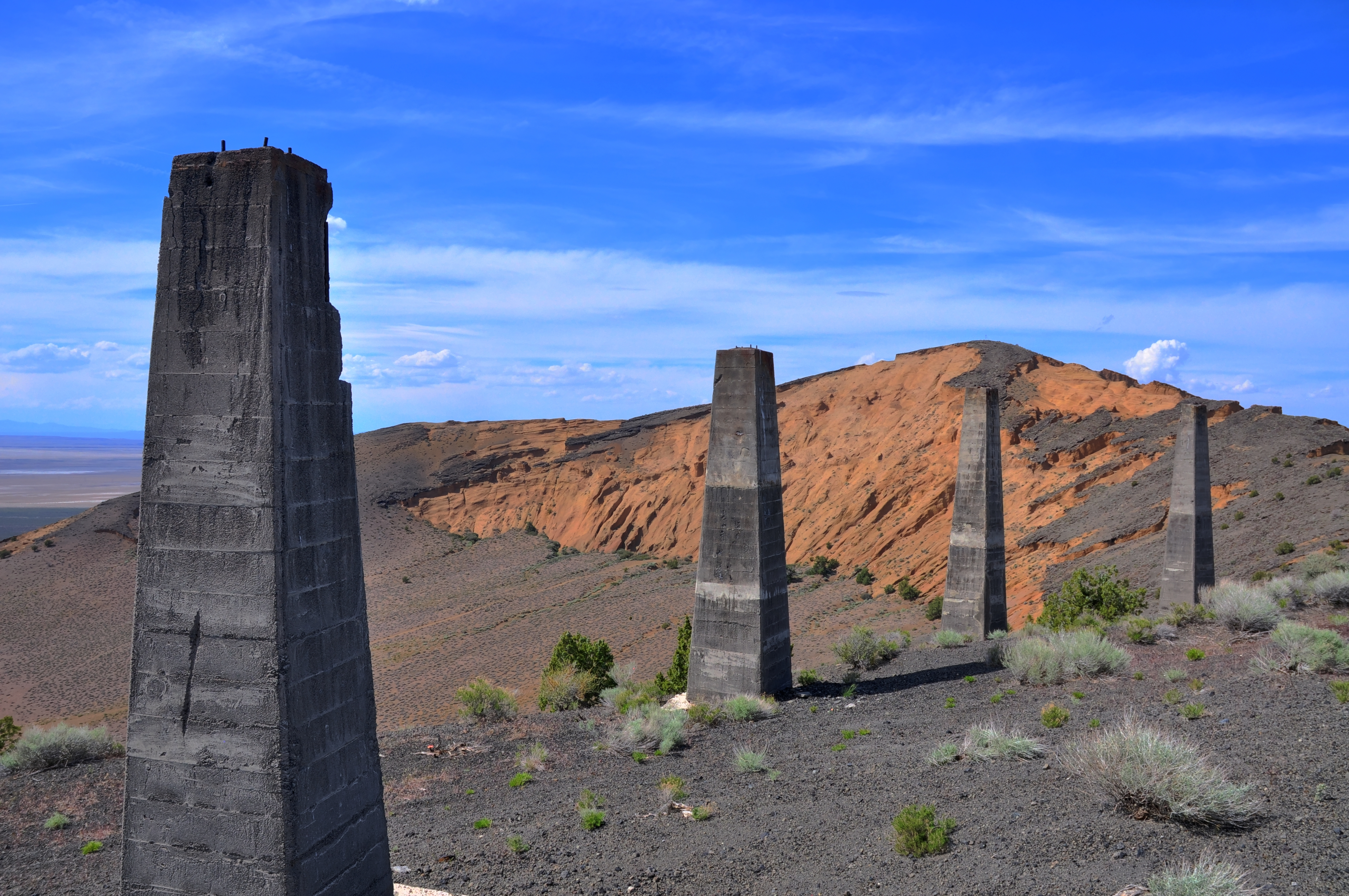
Pahvant Butte, May 2015

Part of the Black Rock Desert volcanic field of the Pleistocene-Holocene age, Pahvant Butte formed above older pahoehoe and aa lavas of the Pahvant field. The volcano was originally a subaqueous volcano formed under Lake Bonneville by a large eruption about 15,500 years ago. The water depth at the time of eruption is estimated to have been 85 m (279 ft). This eruptive activity probably ejected steam, ash, and other materials out of the lake, enveloping the surrounding area with ash and spawning large waves in the lake. The eruption released particles of basaltic lava into the air, which fell back to form tuff.

A raised beach, or lacustrine terrace, formed by waves surrounds most of the volcano's lower rock. A vertical cliff, known as the Lace Curtain, is present on the north flank of the volcano, formed as a result of storm wave action. This name originated from the distinct white, lace-like pattern seen on the cliff face, caused by partial cementation of the tuff by minerals deposited by groundwater.

Pahvant Butte was overlapped by the lava flows of the Ice Springs eruption between 1140 and 1440 AD.

== Morphology ==
The Pahvant Butte volcano consists of an asymmetrical tuff cone with a breach on its southwestern side — and a platform area that extends to the southeast of the cone, formed of beds of tephra dipping steeply away from the cone, and partly concealing a mound of near horizontally-bedded sideromelane tephra beneath.

== History of development ==
The mound of sub-horizontally bedded tephra represents the first stage of the eruption. The ash grains are variably vesiculated, a texture typical of material erupted during phreatomagmatic activity, which involves direct interaction between magma and water. The layers of ash and lapilli, incorporating some clasts of deformed lake sediments, were deposited by sediment gravity flows. Some large ejected blocks have bedding sags beneath them, indicating a ballistic emplacement. The uppermost part of the mound consists of moderately vesicular ash with lapilli, passing up into ripple-marked beds at the base of the overlying cone deposits. These beds are interpreted to represent the result of wave reworking.

The cone consists of steeply dipping layers of mainly palagonite, formed by the alteration of the original basaltic glass. The cone is typical of tuff cones, which form during eruptions in the presence of standing water or abundant groundwater. This part of the volcano was constructed sub-aerially.

The platform consists of deposits formed by the erosion of the cone. These built out into the lake as a prograding delta or beach, forming large cross bedding foresets.
