= Tabernacle Hill =

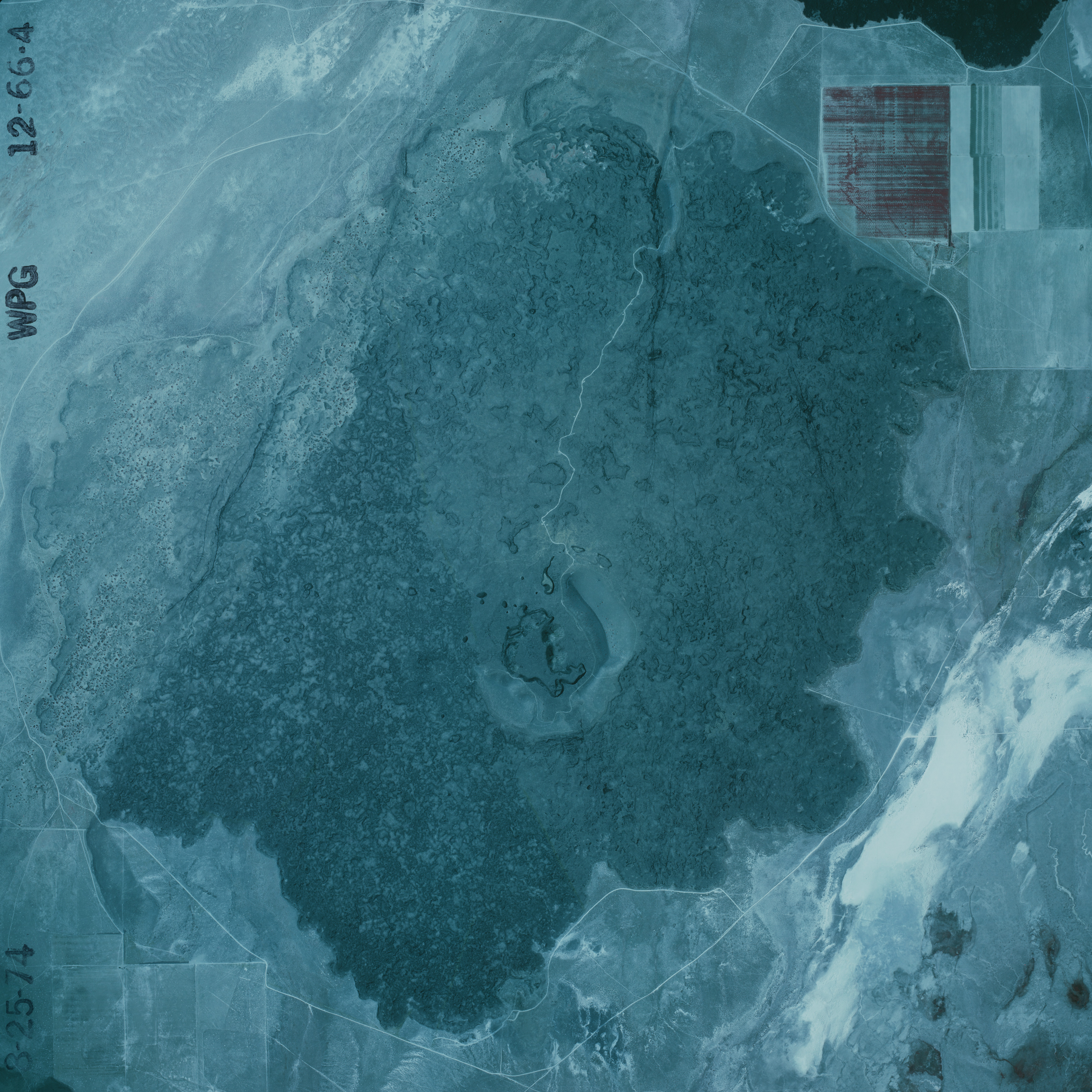
- Tabernacle Hill lava flow. Image is about 6 km wide.

Highest point
- Elevation: 1,493 m (4,898 ft)

Geography
- Location within Utah
- Country: United States
- State: Utah
- Region: Black Rock Desert volcanic field
- District: Millard County
- Range coordinates: 38°54′36″N 112°31′56″W
- Topo map(s): USGS Tabernacle Hill, UT

Tabernacle Hill is a butte formed by a dormant volcano in the west-central portion of Utah, United States.

== Description ==
The butte is located in the Sevier Desert in the Pahvant Valley 11 miles (18 km) southwest of Fillmore.

The ring of hills that include Tabernacle Hill is approximately 1 km in diameter, and it sits somewhat off center to the southeast of a lava field approximately 5 km in diameter.

== Geology ==
Tabernacle Hill is part of the Black Rock Desert volcanic field. The lava of Tabernacle Hill is basalt and tuff of late Pleistocene age. The basalt erupted from the vent at Tabernacle Hill into Lake Bonneville when it was at the Provo level.

Tabernacle Hill lies south of The Cinders, the youngest lava flow in Utah.

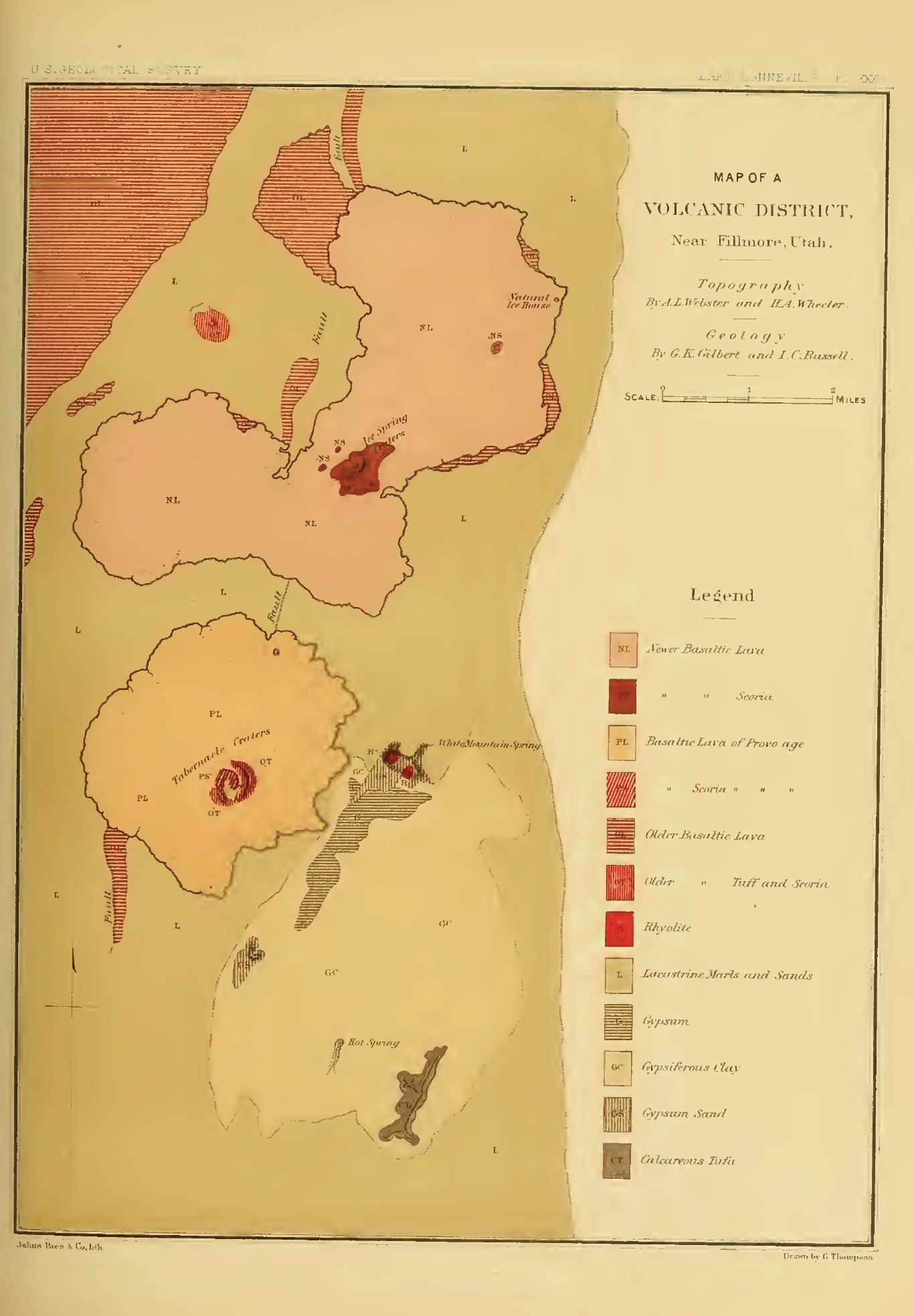
Gilbert and Russell's 1890 Map of the Volcanic District

The basalt of the Cinders and Tabernacle hill was first mapped by geologists Grove Karl Gilbert and Israel Russell in 1890 (see map below).
