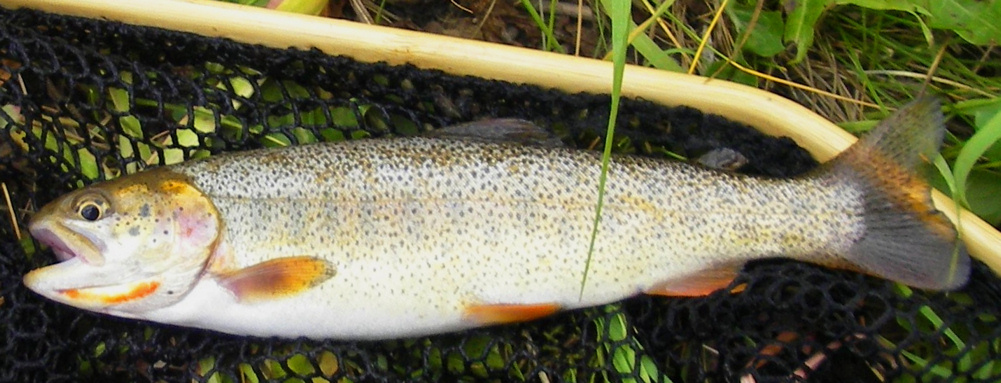

Conservation status
- Critically Imperiled (NatureServe)

Scientific classification
- Kingdom: Animalia
- Phylum: Chordata
- Class: Actinopterygii
- Order: Salmoniformes
- Family: Salmonidae
- Genus: Oncorhynchus
- Species: O. clarkii
- Subspecies: O. c. behnkei

Trinomial name
- Oncorhynchus clarkii behnkei Montgomery, 1995

= Snake River fine-spotted cutthroat trout =

Subspecies of fish

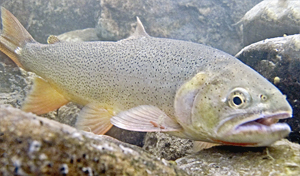
Snake river fine spotted cutthroat trout

The Snake River fine-spotted cutthroat trout is a form of the Yellowstone subspecies of the Rocky Mountain cutthroat trout (Oncorhynchus virginalis). Based on genetic evidence, rather than morphology, it is now considered a variety of the Yellowstone cutthroat trout (O. v. bouvieri). The fish takes its common name from its original habitat, the Snake River of southern Idaho and western Wyoming, and from its unusual pattern of hundreds of small spots that cover most of its body, differing from the larger-spotted Yellowstone cutthroat pattern. Genetically, it cannot be distinguished from the Yellowstone cutthroat trout, and before the construction of dams, no physical barriers were between the ranges of the two subspecies in the Snake River drainage.

The subspecies was scientifically named in 1995 in a popular book by columnist M. R. Montgomery, to honor the fisheries research of Dr. Robert J. Behnke, who had presented its (unnamed) description in 1992.

== Hybrids ==
While fine-spotted x rainbow trout crosses are observed in the South Fork of the Snake River in Idaho, they are infrequently encountered and appear to be hatchery hybrids. Conversely, Yellowstone x rainbow crosses are common; the "cutbows" of Yellowstone Park in the Lamar River drainage are natural hybrids.

== Diet ==
In addition to their natural aversion to cross-breeding with other trout, fine-spotted cutthroats are unusual in their pursuit of a vertebrate diet, mainly other fish, but occasionally including small mammals. While the fine-spotted cutthroats can be very selective feeders during a major hatch of aquatic invertebrates, they are not as focused as rainbow or brown trout, and can be diverted with small terrestrial imitations. In addition, when no obvious hatch occurs, anglers can be very successful with large streamer flies that imitate small fish.

== See also ==
- Fishing in Wyoming
