= Fishing in Wyoming =

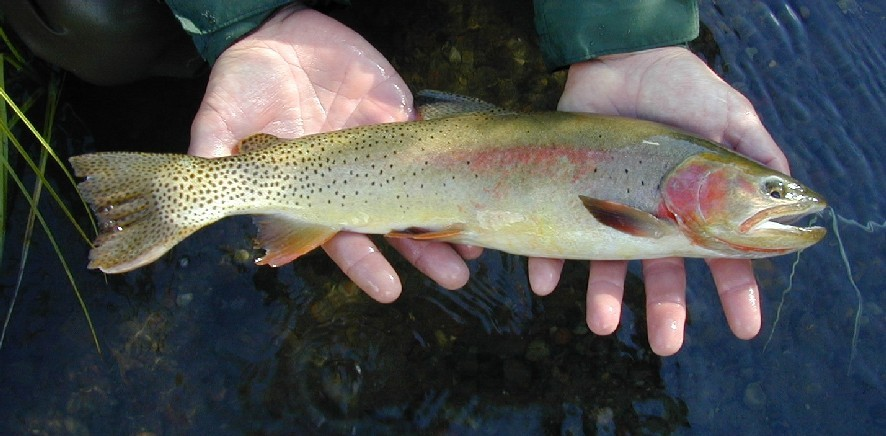
A Yellowstone cutthroat trout (Oncorhynchus clarki bouvieri).

A game fish is any species of fish pursued for sport by recreationalists (anglers). The capture of game fish is usually tightly regulated. In comparison, nongame fish are all fish not considered game fish. Game fish may be eaten after being caught, though increasingly anglers are practicing catch-and-release tactics to improve fish populations.

In the U.S. state of Wyoming there are about 4,200 lakes (with over 333,000 acres (1,348 km^{2}) of water) and over 27,000 miles (43,000 km) of fishable streams. There are 78 fish species, 28 of which are game fish (including 9 native species) and 50 are nongame fish (including 40 native species). Wyoming game fish include bass (Micropterus and Ambloplites); sunfish (Lepomis); crappie (Pomoxis); walleye and sauger (Sander); yellow perch (Perca); trout, salmon, and char (Salmo, Oncorhynchus, and Salvelinus); whitefish (Prosopium); grayling (Thymallus), pike (Esox); catfish and bullheads (Ameiurus, Ictalurus, Noturus, and Pylodictis), burbot (Lota); sturgeon (Scaphirhyncus); and freshwater drum (Aplodinotus).

Trout species include rainbow trout, cutthroat trout, brown trout, brook trout, and lake trout. There are four subspecies of cutthroat trout native to Wyoming: the Colorado River cutthroat, the Yellowstone cutthroat, the Bonneville cutthroat, and the Snake River cutthroat.

Threats to Wyoming game fish include the New Zealand mud snail, the common carp, and whirling disease. In addition, the introduction of brook sticklebacks (Culaea incontans), walleyes, ling suckers, and white suckers have impacted the ecology of native game fish. Conservation efforts to protect Wyoming game fish include licensing, creel limits, and issuing conservation stamps.

== See also ==
- Angling in Yellowstone National Park
