= Black Rock Desert volcanic field =

Cluster of volcanic features in Millard County, Utah

Coordinates: 38°58′12″N 112°30′00″W

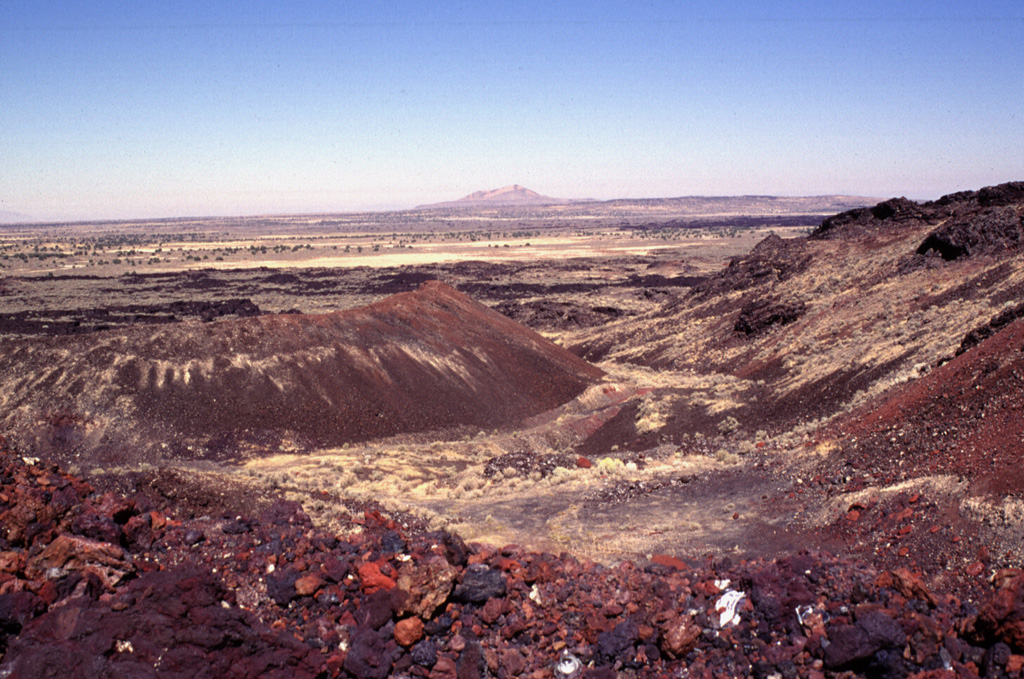
Black Rock Desert, at southwest Pavant Valley-(Tabernacle Hill); Pavant Butte, about 15 mi due north.

The Black Rock Desert volcanic field in Millard County, Utah, is a cluster of several volcanic features of the Great Basin including Pahvant Butte, The Cinders, and Tabernacle Hill. The field's Ice Springs event was an explosive eruption followed by lava flows that were Utah's most recent volcanic activity (1140–1440 AD). which overlapped the older flows of Pavant Butte.

The Pleistocene-Holocene field has been an active tectonic area for approximately 2.7 million years. Within the past 1.5 million years, local volcanism has produced both rhyolitic and basaltic cones from near twenty-four vents from which lava escapes through geologic faults.

== See also ==
- List of volcanic fields
