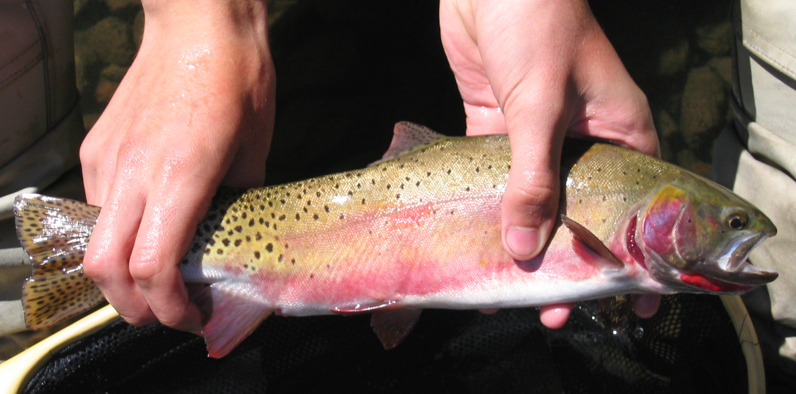
- Rio Grande cutthroat trout, Oncorhynchus virginalis virginalis, the type subspecies

Conservation status
- Unranked (NatureServe)

Scientific classification
- Kingdom: Animalia
- Phylum: Chordata
- Class: Actinopterygii
- Division: Teleostei
- Order: Salmoniformes
- Family: Salmonidae
- Genus: Oncorhynchus
- Species: O. virginalis

Binomial name
- Oncorhynchus virginalis (Girard, 1857)

Subspecies
- Subspecies: Oncorhynchus virginalis virginalis (Rio Grande) O. v. bouvierii (Yellowstone) O. v. utah (Bonneville) O. v. ssp. (Bear River) O. v. macdonaldi† (Yellowfin) O. v. pleuriticus (Colorado River) O. v. ssp. (Green River) O. v. ssp. (San Juan) O. v. stomias (threatened) (Greenback)
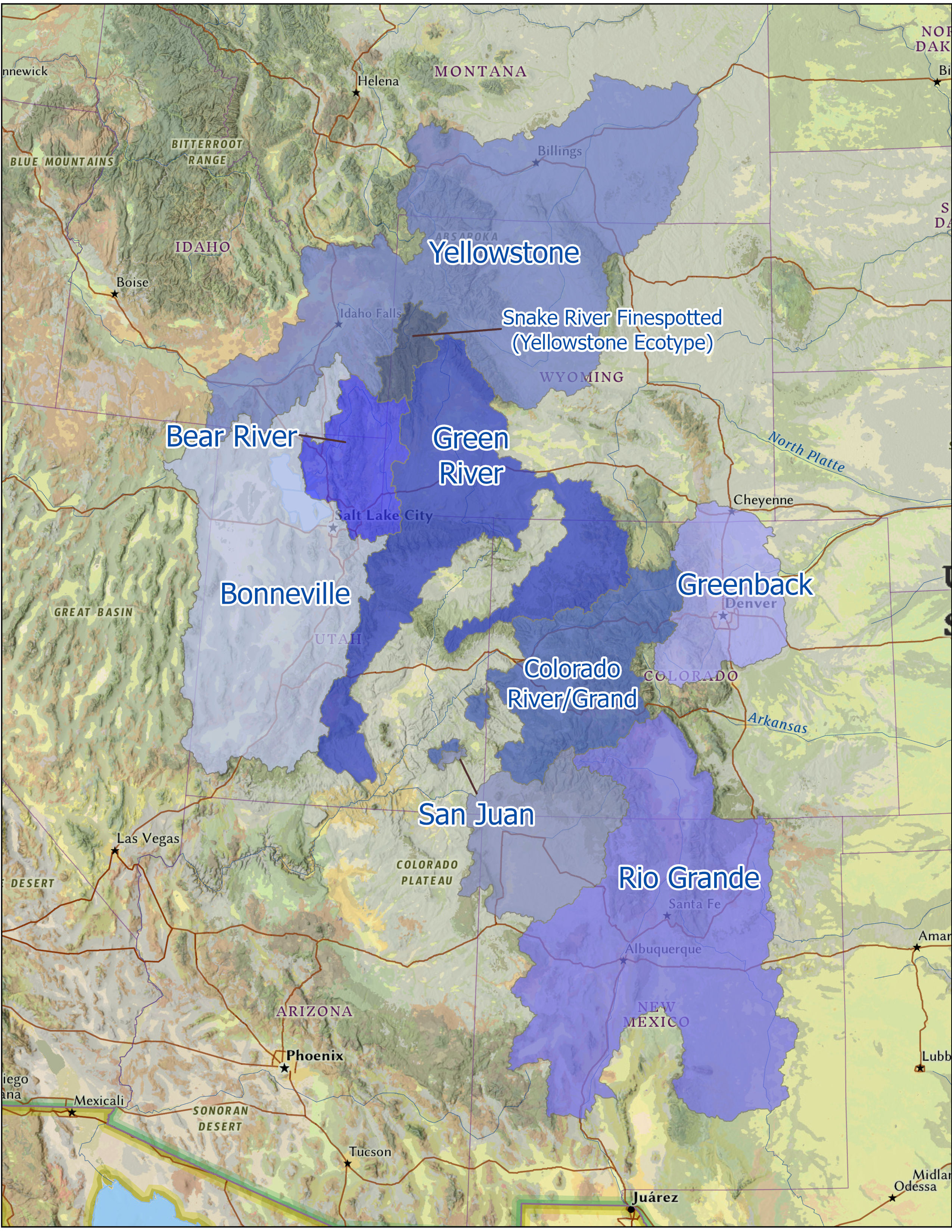
- Range map of Rocky Mountain cutthroat trout (Onchorynchus virginalis)

= Rocky Mountain cutthroat trout =

Species of fish

The Rocky Mountain cutthroat trout (Oncorhynchus virginalis), formerly lumped in with the cutthroat trout (Oncorhynchus clarkii) as one species with multiple subspecies, is a fish species of the family Salmonidae native to cold-water tributaries of the northern and southern Rocky Mountains, as well as into portions of the Great Basin in North America. As a member of the genus Oncorhynchus, it is a part of the Pacific trout group, which includes the widely distributed rainbow trout. Cutthroat trout are popular gamefish, especially among anglers who enjoy fly fishing. The common name "cutthroat" refers to the distinctive red coloration on the underside of the lower jaw.

== Taxonomy ==
Historically, cutthroat trout was considered one species (Oncorhynchus clarkii). However, recent genetic, taxonomic, and geologic evidence has determined that cutthroat trout should be divided into four species, with each (except for the coastal cutthroat) having multiple subspecies corresponding to the evolutionary lineages found within major river basins. In 2023, the American Fisheries Society formerly reclassified all Cutthroat Trout from one species into four distinct species: Coastal, Lahontan, Westslope, and Rocky Mountain Cutthroat Trout.

=== Subspecies and uniquely identifiable evolutionary units ===
During the annual meeting of the American Fisheries Society (AFS) in 2015, the Western Division of AFS (WDAFS) organized a special workshop with a panel of experts to evaluate the validity of the currently recognized subspecies, considering the available evidence both supporting and challenging the existing classification system. The panel found the current classification scientifically indefensible, and proposed a revised phylogeny and classification that aligns with the comprehensive evidence.

In that discussion, the panelists were unable to resolve how to discuss specific subsets of the population. One side argued that subspecies are valuable taxonomic ranks, because they represent important evolutionary and ecological information that should be recognized to preserve biodiversity. The other side argued that subspecies do not always align with true evolutionary entities, and are arbitrary designations of geographic lineages within a species.

To resolve the impasse, the panel coined the term "uniquely identifiable evolutionary unit" (UIEU) to describe subunits that have diverged from species. These UIEUs are distinct population groups that show evolutionary independence but do not meet all the criteria to be considered full species. The creation of this term allowed the panel to acknowledge and discuss these units without getting caught up in the subspecies debate.

=== Evolutionary lineages ===
==== The upper Snake River/Yellowstone evolutionary lineage ====
The upper Snake River/Yellowstone evolutionary lineage, exhibiting nine uniquely identifiable evolutionary units (UIEUs), shows complex patterns of divergence and dispersal. Genetic evidence suggests that the lineage initially diverged from the Lahontan Basin lineage around 9 million years ago, potentially facilitated by drainage connections between the two basins. However, gene exchange between these lineages persisted until approximately 3.07 million years ago.

Among the nine recognized UIEUs within this lineage are an upper Snake/Yellowstone UIEU, a Bear River UIEU, and a Bonneville Basin UIEU. Notably, the Fine-spotted Snake River Cutthroat Trout, previously designated as O. c. behnkei, lacks support as a distinct UIEU in the current molecular evidence, despite its ecological and morphological differences.

Studies indicate a closer ancestral relationship between Bear River cutthroat trout and Yellowstone Cutthroat Trout than with Bonneville cutthroat trout, suggesting a complex branching within the upper Snake River/Yellowstone lineage. Additionally, mitochondrial DNA sequence data point to a genetic affinity between the Bonneville UIEU and Cutthroat Trout in the Colorado River and nearby watersheds, indicating dispersal routes beyond those traditionally proposed.

==== Southern Rocky Mountain lineage ====
The Southern Rocky Mountain region, previously thought to harbor four cutthroat trout subspecies, has been revealed to contain six distinct UIEUs. This includes three distinct clades within the Colorado River cutthroat trout (O. v. pleuriticus), referred to as the blue and green lineages in the scientific literature, as well as the San Juan cutthroat trout (O. v. ssp.), the Greenback cutthroat trout (O. v. stomias), the extinct Yellowfin cutthroat trout (O. v. macdonaldi), and the Rio Grande cutthroat trout (O. v. virginalis). These findings, along with the misidentification of the original specimen used to describe the Greenback cutthroat trout, demonstrate the changing nature of the understanding of cutthroat trout diversity and the importance of continuing research.

==== Uniquely identifiable evolutionary units of Rocky Mountain cutthroat trout ====
Common name	Scientific name*	Range	Image
Rio Grande	Oncorhynchus virginalis virginalis	The southernmost subspecies of cutthroat trout, native to the Rio Grande, Canadian and Pecos River drainages of New Mexico and Colorado. Despite the fact that the Canadian drainage is tributary to the Arkansas River and not the Rio Grande, genetic evidence shows they Canadian drainage from a headwater transfer from the Pecos drainage. Rio Grande cutthroat were likely native to the Davis Mountains of Texas as well.	Rio Grande Cutthroat
Yellowstone	O. v. bouvierii	Native to the Yellowstone and Upper Snake River drainages of Montana, Idaho, Wyoming and small areas of Utah and Nevada. The Snake River Finespotted cutthroat was once considered a distinct subspecies. However, recent genetic studies reveal that it is actually a uniquely spotted form of the Yellowstone cutthroat. Previously, the Yellowstone cutthroat was classified as a "major" subspecies of cutthroat trout, but more recent classifications now regard it as a subspecies of the Rocky Mountain cutthroat trout.	
Bonneville	O. v. utah	The Bonneville cutthroat evolved in ancient Lake Bonneville, which reached its peak during the last ice age, and overflowed into the Snake River. Today, most existing populations are found in small, isolated streams along the basin's edge. Additionally, there are remnant populations within the current native range of the Yellowstone cutthroat, located in a few small streams in the Raft and Portneuf River drainages in Idaho, from when ancient Lake Bonneville overflowed into the Snake River drainage during the last ice age	
Bear River	O. v. ssp.	Native to the Bear River watershed at the Idaho, Utah, and Wyoming border. The Bear River cutthroat were lumped with the Bonneville cutthroat as a single subspecies until recently. Genetic studies show they are actually more closely related to the Yellowstone cutthroat than to the Bonneville cutthroat. Geological evidence suggests that the Bear River flowed into the Snake River until about 500,000 years ago, when volcanic activity redirected the river south into its own basin and formed ancient Lake Thatcher. The connection to the Bonneville Basin likely occurred around 20,000 years ago when Lake Thatcher overflowed into ancient Lake Bonneville. Genetic evidence indicates a distinctiveness from Bonneville cutthroat, and is recognized as a distinct subspecies	Bear River Cutthroat Trout
Yellowfin	O. v. macdonaldi†	Native to the Twin Lakes of the Arkansas River drainage in Colorado. The Yellowfin cutthroat shared its habitat with the greenback cutthroat trout, but was distinguished by its morphology and life history. After the introduction of rainbow trout into Twin Lakes, the Yellowfin cutthroat trout went extinct. Recent research has speculated that the Yellowfin cutthroat may have been native to the entire Arkansas River basin, not just Twin Lakes. Efforts are underway with hopes of locating a lost population. A rare strain of cutthroat from Hayden Creek, tributary to the Arkansas River, was rescued from a fire in 2016, and used to reestablish populations around the basin. These are the only known fish to share genetics with Yellowfin cutthroat.	Yellowfin Cutthroat
Colorado River	O. v. pleuriticus	Sometimes referred to as the "green lineage" in scientific literature. Native to the Dolores, Colorado, and Gunnison River Basins. Some small populations existed in Utah.	Colorado River cutthroat trout
Green River	O. v. ssp.	Historically lumped into the Colorado River cutthroat, and native to the White, Yampa, and upper Green River watersheds, extending from northwest Colorado, southwest Wyoming, and into eastern and central Utah. Sometimes referred to as the "blue lineage" in scientific literature. Stocking programs using wild eggs collected from Trappers Lake in the early 1900s has resulted in pure, healthy populations - sometimes well outside its native range.	Green River cutthroat trout
San Juan	O. v. ssp.	Also lumped in with the Colorado River cutthroat. Native to San Juan River and its tributaries across small portions of the Four Corners region. This trout was formally re-discovered in 2012, by analyzing the genetics of two museum specimens obtained from the basin in 1874. Between 2012 and mid-2018, it was presumed extinct, until a handful of populations were discovered near the San Juan National Forest. The 416 Fire prompted a hasty rescue of pure specimens from two remote creeks, and have been used to establish a brood stock and restore populations around the basin.	San Juan cutthroat trout
Greenback	O. v. stomias (threatened)	Native to the South Platte River basin, though also considered native to the Arkansas basin at one time. It was considered extinct by the 1930s, until a population was discovered in Rocky Mountain National Park in 1957. This led to extensive progress towards reestablishing populations across Colorado. However, in 2012, genetic testing revealed that the trout used in the many-decade reintroduction program were Colorado River or Rio Grande cutthroats, and that the only remaining population of pure greenbacks were in a 4-mile (6.4 km) stretch of Bear Creek, a tributary of the Arkansas River. Several populations have since been established using this pure broodstock. Colorado Parks and Wildlife announced in 2022 that the wild spawning of greenbacks had been observed.	Greenback cutthroat trout
*as proposed by Love Stowell, et al. 2018.

== Description ==
Like all other cutthroat, Rocky Mountain cutthroat trout display a high degree of variability in terms of size, color, and habitat selection. These trout exhibit a range of colors from yellowish-brown, silvery, brassy, to brilliant orange-red and golden. They may have bright golden-orange, red, or rose tints. Spots vary from medium-large and rounded to small and pepper-like, and can be concentrated on the caudal peduncle or evenly distributed over the sides. They typically have between 60 and 63 vertebrae and a number of lateral scales ranging from 150 to 200. Adult weight ranges can vary between approximately 10 grams to over 7 kilograms. The largest known Rocky Mountain cutthroat was the Yellowfin. Due to historical introductions and hybridization with other subspecies, it can be difficult to unambiguously separate some Rocky Mountain cutthroat trout from other closely related subspecies based on appearance alone. All have distinctive red, pink, or orange linear marks along the underside of their mandibles in the lower folds of the gill plates. The common name "cutthroat" comes from these marks, coined in an 1884 article in The American Angler by outdoor writer Charles Hallock.

== Lifecycle ==
Most Rocky Mountain cutthroat trout live a fluvial or adfluvial lifecycle. However, the broad diversity of environments, influenced by factors such as elevation and stream characteristics, leads to a wide array of life history patterns and survival strategies. Likewise, the specific timing and duration of these stages can vary among different populations and subspecies. For example, populations at higher elevations may have shorter growing seasons and delayed maturity compared to those in lower-elevation streams. Additionally, factors such as stream flow, temperature, and food availability can significantly influence growth rates and survival throughout the lifecycle.

Populations that are born and raised in small streams tend to be less migratory and move short distances. Conversely, some migratory populations move great distances (up to 100 km) to reach ideal spawning, feeding, and overwintering habitats. Lacustrine populations tend to be the largest, with variations depending on whether they migrate upstream or downstream to spawn in inlet versus outlet tributaries. Most populations spawn in smaller tributaries, though main-stem spawning in larger rivers will sometimes occur.

=== Spawning ===
Spawning generally occurs in spring, with peak activity in May or June, but can extend into July at higher altitudes. Spawning locations are often in the upper reaches of streams, where females create redds in gravel to deposit eggs.

=== Egg incubation and emergence ===
Eggs typically incubate for about 4–6 weeks before hatching. After hatching, the alevins remain in the gravel for several more weeks, relying on their yolk sacs for nourishment.

=== Fry and juvenile stages ===
Once the yolk sac is absorbed, the fry emerge from the gravel and begin feeding on small aquatic insects and zooplankton. Growth rates vary widely depending on environmental conditions (such as elevation), with some individuals reaching 300mm in length within two years.

=== Maturity and adult stages ===
Sexual maturity is usually reached between ages 2 and 4, but can be delayed in harsher, high-elevation environments where growing seasons are shorter. Adults grow at a slower rate than juveniles. They primarily feed on aquatic and terrestrial insects, as well as other small fish.

==== Lifespan ====
The maximum lifespan of cutthroat trout is estimated to be around 7–10 years, but most individuals likely live shorter lives due to factors like predation, fishing pressure, and habitat degradation.

== Ecology ==
=== Range ===
Rocky Mountain cutthroat trout are historically native to a broad range of river drainages and basins across the western United States. They inhabit areas from the Rio Grande, Canadian, and Pecos River drainages in New Mexico and southern Colorado, extending to the Yellowstone and Upper Snake River drainages in Montana, Idaho, Wyoming, and parts of Utah and Nevada. They are also found in the Bear River watershed at the Idaho, Utah, and Wyoming border, and in various basins such as the Dolores, Colorado, Gunnison, White, Yampa, and upper Green River watersheds in Colorado, Wyoming, and Utah. They are also native to the South Platte and Arkansas drainages. At one time, they also likely were established in the Davis Mountains in Texas. Currently, their range is broadly restricted to the headwater reaches of these watersheds.

=== Habitat ===
As with other salmonids, Rocky Mountain cutthroat trout need cold, clean, and well-oxygenated water to survive and thrive. They typically inhabit creeks, streams, and small rivers with gravelly bottoms or cold, moderately deep lakes. Stream-side vegetation provides shade and minimizes erosion and sediment load (mainly silt) by stabilizing banks, which would otherwise adversely affect habitat and spawning grounds. Beaver ponds provide refuge during periods of drought and habitat to over winter in. As seen with other cutthroat trout, they exhibit an opportunistic feeding behavior with diverse diets, and as their size increases, so does their food. Some of their primary forage, frequently imitated by fly fishers, include macroinvertebrates such as caddisflies, stoneflies, mayflies and aquatic dipterans (including midges and craneflies) in adult, larval, and pupal stages. Other prey include adult terrestrial insects such as ants, beetles, spiders, grasshoppers and crickets, and aquatic items including crayfish, freshwater molluscs, fish eggs, shrimp and other crustaceans, and other fish. Generally, they adjust their diet and feeding behavior due to factors such as food availability, habitat, age, and size. For example, lake-dwelling Yellowstone rocky mountain cutthroat eat zooplankton and bottom-dwelling insects, while Bear River species in Bear Lake have evolved with a diet largely dependent on smaller fish, such as the endemic Bonneville cisco. Stream-resident cutthroat are primarily drift feeders, eating insects carried by the current.

== Population threats ==
=== Degradation and loss of habitat ===
Cutthroat trout populations are negatively impacted by habitat loss and degradation caused by human activities. These activities can include damming, logging, mining, grazing, wildfires, agriculture and water diversions all negatively impact Rocky Mountain cutthroat trout. Dams alter the natural flow of rivers and streams, fragmenting habitats and changing water temperatures, which can disrupt the trout's breeding and migration patterns. Logging and grazing removes streamside vegetation, leading to increased water temperatures and sedimentation, which negatively affect trout eggs and juvenile survival. Mining activities often release pollutants into waterways, degrading water quality and harming trout populations, while urban development can lead to increased stormwater runoff, which carries pollutants and sediment into streams, further degrading habitat quality. All of these activities can lead to changes in water temperature, flow patterns, and the availability of food and habitat, which are all crucial for the survival and reproduction of cutthroat trout.

Habitat connectivity has always provided a safety net from extinction by linking habitat of various quality to stream headwaters. In fact, the source-sink processes allowed various cutthroat strains to evolve, survive, and thrive through the eons. Conversely, the loss of drainage connections by human activities has been a significant threat to cutthroat throughout the west.

=== Hybridization and introgression ===
Cutthroat trout easily hybridize with introduced rainbow trout, which can lead to the loss of genetically pure cutthroat trout populations. Hatchery practices have also contributed to this problem by accidentally mixing different subspecies. Even by the early 1900s, many fisheries were wholly or partially disrupted by the introduction of non-native rainbow trout or by the transplanting of distinct populations of cutthroats outside of their native range.

Not only does hybridization result in less-adaptive and successful cutthroat, it makes the genetic unravelling of the native trout to each basin incredibly complicated.

=== Competition and predation ===
Introduced species such as brown trout, rainbow trout, brook trout, and lake trout can compete with cutthroat trout for food and resources, and can also prey on them. One extreme example can be seen in Yellowstone Lake in Yellowstone National Park, where introduced lake trout have caused a serious decline in Yellowstone cutthroat trout.

Another study looked at hatchery-raised Rio Grande cutthroat trout which inhabit the same stream as wild brown trout. That study showed a lower body fat content and substantially different diet than Rio Grande cutthroat found in streams without brown trout. They also showed fin damage in the presence of brown trout, all of which suggests aggressive and territorial behavior by brown trout.

Non-native brook trout and rainbow trout have been stocked and transplanted throughout the native range of Rocky Mountain cutthroat trout, are widely established, and generally self-sustaining. In Idaho, these are often cited as the largest long-term threats to both Yellowstone and Bonneville cutthroat trout by displacing them. Brook trout and Rocky Mountain cutthroat trout exploit very similar niches and directly compete with each other. However, because brook trout have many reproductive advantages (earlier maturation, greater fertility, and offspring emerge earlier in the year), brook trout are able to replace cutthroat very quickly.

Displacement by introduced fish species is primarily attributed to disease or parasite transmission, competition, and hybridization. The impact of each mechanism varies significantly depending on the intruding species involved. With rainbow trout, the main concern is introgressive hybridization, though competition does play a role.

=== Disease ===
Rocky Mountain cutthroat trout are susceptible to a variety of diseases and parasites, which can be exacerbated by stress caused by other factors such as climate change, change in water flow regimes, habitat loss and hybridization. Whirling disease is especially damaging to native trout populations.

=== Climate change ===
Over deep time, climate change played the predominant role in the diversification and speciation/subspeciation of cutthroat trout, including the Rocky Mountain species and daughter taxa. However, rising water temperatures and changes in streamflow patterns caused by climate change can make it difficult for cutthroat trout to survive and reproduce. This is exacerbated by habitat fragmentation; without the connectivity of populations to buffer the effects of shrinking habitat, it imperils most cutthroat populations.
