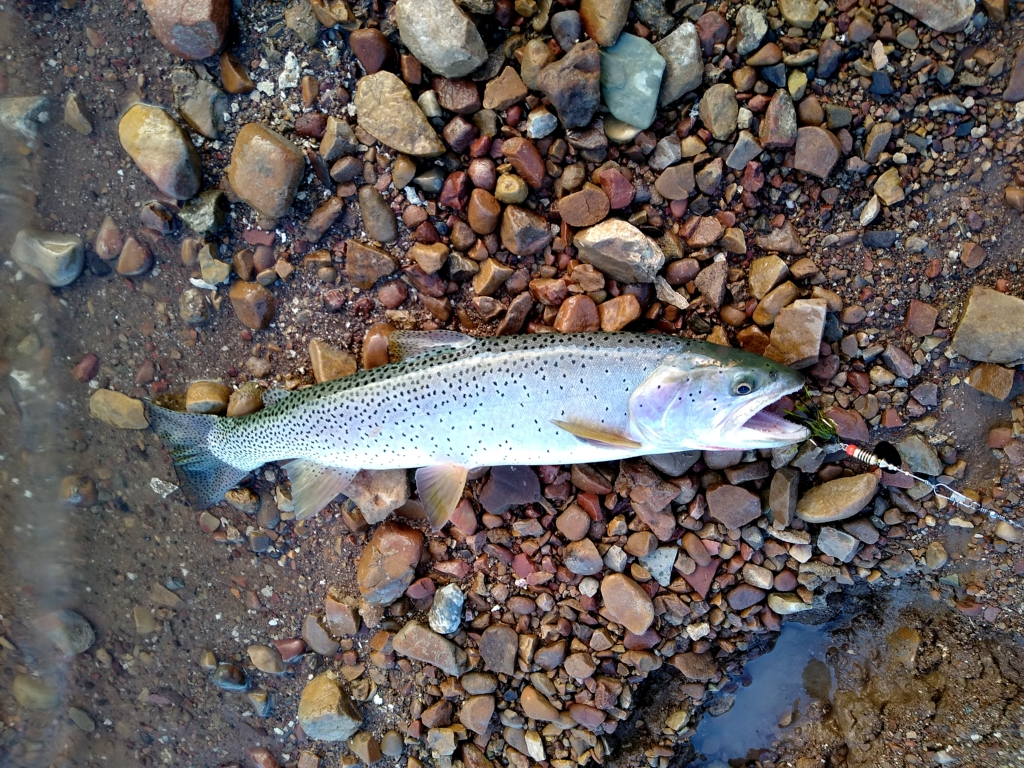

Conservation status
- Apparently Secure (NatureServe)

Scientific classification
- Kingdom: Animalia
- Phylum: Chordata
- Class: Actinopterygii
- Division: Teleostei
- Order: Salmoniformes
- Family: Salmonidae
- Genus: Oncorhynchus
- Species: O. virginalis
- Subspecies: O. v. utah

Trinomial name
- Oncorhynchus virginalis utah (Girard, 1856; Suckley, 1874)

= Bonneville cutthroat trout =

Subspecies of fish

The Bonneville cutthroat trout, Oncorhynchus virginalis utah, (formerly, O. clarkii utah) is a subspecies of Rocky Mountain Cutthroat Trout native to tributaries of the Great Salt Lake and Sevier Lake. Most of the fish's current and historic range is in Utah, but they are also found in Idaho, Wyoming, and Nevada. This is one of 14 or so recognized subspecies of cutthroat trout native to the western United States. However, In 2023 the American Fisheries Society Common and Scientific Names of Fishes from the United States, Canada, and Mexico, 8th edition reclassified all Cutthroat Trout from one species (formerly, Oncorhynchus clarkii) into four distinct species: Coastal, Lahontan, Westslope, and Rocky Mountain Cutthroat Trout. The Bonneville Cutthroat retained their trinomial designation as a subspecies (utah), but as a subspecies of the Rocky Mountain Cutthroat Trout (Oncorhynchus virginalis).

In 1997, the Bonneville cutthroat was designated the official state fish of Utah, replacing the rainbow trout. It was important to the Native Americans and the Mormon pioneers as a source of food.

== Natural history ==
Bonneville cutthroats are descended from cutthroat trout that once inhabited the Late Pleistocene-aged Lake Bonneville of Utah, eastern Nevada, and southern Idaho. Since the desiccation of Lake Bonneville into the Great Salt Lake, which is too salty for any life other than brine shrimp, Bonneville cutthroats have been isolated in smaller populations such as the headwaters of mountain creeks, streams, rivers, reservoirs, and lakes of the Bonneville drainage basin. This isolation has resulted in much phenotypic variation among populations.

Bonneville cutthroat trout are mainly piscivorous. Depending on which waters they've been introduced to, or to which they've naturally migrated, Bonneville cutthroats will consume chubs, gizzard shad, whitefish, Utah suckers, or any other small or fledgling fish, including very small bass, very small walleye, and even other trout, such as the many fingerling rainbow trout which are state-stocked by the millions in Mountain West waters. The Bonneville cutthroat's secondary forage is insects, especially in high mountain lakes or streams where other fish may be scarce.

== Description ==
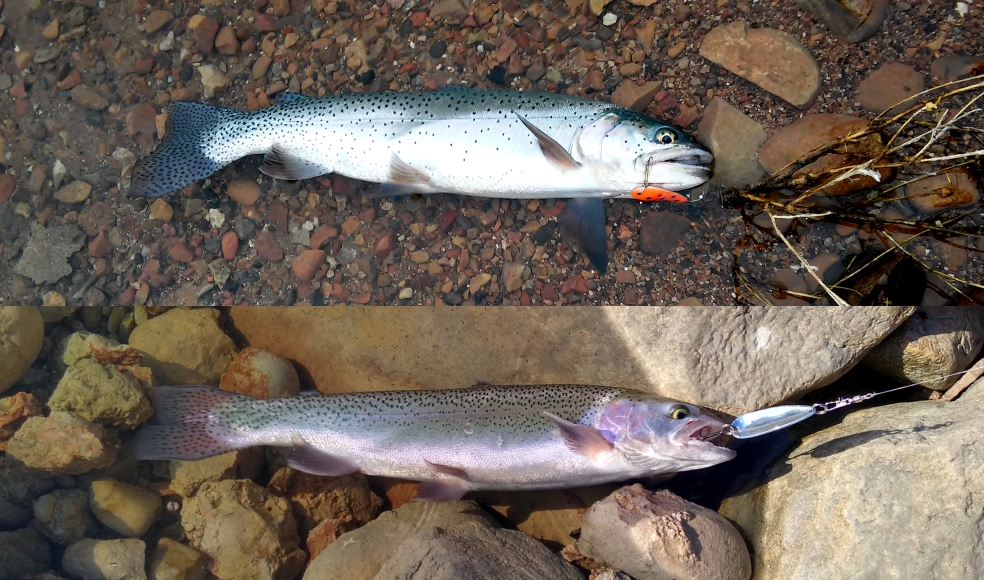
Bonneville cutthroat (top) in comparison with a typical rainbow trout (bottom) from Utah's reservoirs

The Bonneville cutthroat is like many other subspecies of cutthroat, typified by scattered, pixel-like, black dots over its upper body. Lake and reservoir Bonnevilles will display subdued colors of silver-gray to charcoal, with the upper body having sometimes subtle hues of pink on the sides, blending to deep green along the spine. River Bonnevilles, like river brown trout, often have a much more yellow quality, greatly overtaking both the pinks and greens of the lake variety. These fish, particularly the Bear Lake strain, sometimes lack the bright crimson jaw slash that, at times, may be yellow, pink, or orange.

Cutthroat and rainbow trout differ in that cutthroats have basibranchial (hyoid) teeth in their throat between the gill arches and behind the tongue. The dots on the Bonneville are usually larger, as well as sparser, when compared to the rainbow. And the Bonneville has a larger, more distinct jawline.

== Conservation ==
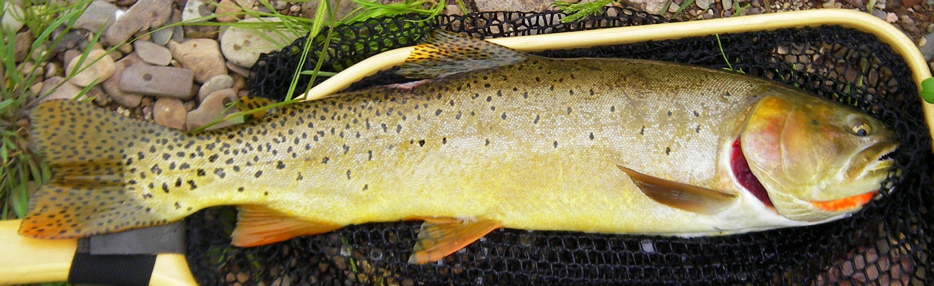
A Bonneville cutthroat trout, with the yellowed coloring typical of river fish

As one of the features of native trout of the Mountain West, Bonneville cutthroats suffered intense fishing pressure for commerce and sustenance from the 1850s through the 1920s. At one time they were so numerous they were considered a nuisance, but today they are on the Utah Sensitive Species List. Bonneville cutthroats spawn near the mouths of streams, over gravel substrate in the springtime; having an incubation period of 24 to 25 days. Occasionally the Bonneville will interspecies-breed with rainbow trout—since the two species share many of the same waters—producing cutbow hybrids. In order to preserve the pure Bonneville cutthroat, the state of Utah has attempted to keep certain waters Bonneville-specific, such as Little Dell Reservoir, just up-stream from Mountain Dell Reservoir.

== See also ==
- Fishing in Wyoming
