= Colorado River cutthroat trout =

Conservation status
- Vulnerable (NatureServe)

Scientific classification
- Kingdom: Animalia
- Phylum: Chordata
- Class: Actinopterygii
- Division: Teleostei
- Order: Salmoniformes
- Family: Salmonidae
- Genus: Oncorhynchus
- Species: O. virginalis
- Subspecies: O. v. pleuriticus

Trinomial name
- Oncorhynchus virginalis pleuriticus (Cope, 1872)

Synonyms
- Oncorhynchus clarki subsp. pleuriticus (Cope, 1872)

Subspecies of fish

The Colorado River cutthroat trout, Oncorhynchus virginalis pleuriticus, (formerly, Oncorhynchus clarkii pleuriticus) is a subspecies of Rocky Mountain cutthroat trout native only to the Green and Colorado River basins, which are west of the Continental Divide.

== Range ==
In the past, this subspecies was found throughout portions of the Colorado River drainage in Wyoming, Colorado, Utah, Arizona, and New Mexico. However, recent estimates suggest this subspecies occupies around 14% of its historic range.

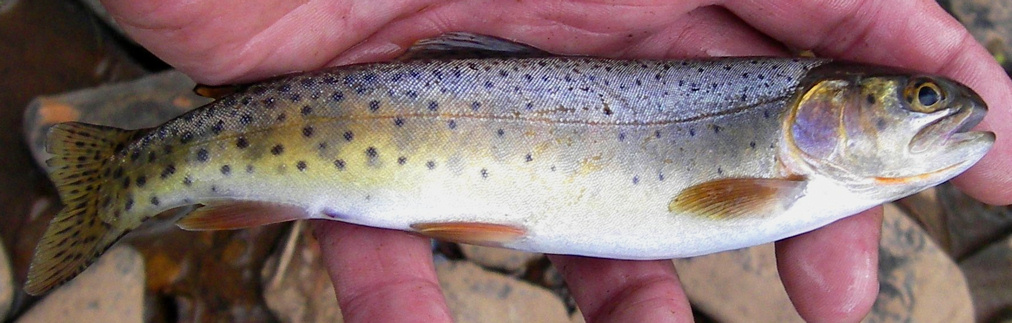
A young Colorado River cutthroat

Colorado River cutthroat trout are thought to have occupied the basin of upper Muddy Creek, a tributary of the Little Snake River (which ultimately flows into the Colorado River) in southern Carbon County, Wyoming. Historical accounts in letters and diaries refer to them as "mountain trout" or "speckled trout." The fish may have begun to disappear from the upper Muddy Creek in the 1850s as a result of physical changes made to the environment by travelers, the introduction of the brook trout and other non-native species, and possibly the over-trapping of beavers, which affected dams and dependent habitats.

A distinct lineage of Colorado River cutthroat trout known as the San Juan cutthroat was also found in the San Juan River and its tributaries, and was identified in 2012 by genetic testing of two specimens collected in 1874 near Pagosa Springs. While feared extinct, 8 isolated populations were discovered in and around the San Juan National Forest in mid-2018. Shortly after the rediscovery of the San Juan cutthroat, their remnant populations were threatened by the 416 Fire, which was closing in on their remaining habitat. In response, 58 San Juan cutthroats were removed from two remote creeks north of Durango and are being held in hatcheries, with the ultimate goal of captive breeding and reintroduction.

== Conservation ==
Rangewide conservation agreements and management strategies are in place for this species. The Wyoming Game and Fish Department in cooperation with the Bureau of Land Management, Little Snake Conservation District, the U.S. Fish and Wildlife Service and Trout Unlimited have successfully reintroduced Colorado River cutthroat into the Little Snake River basin. Efforts have included improving stream habitat and removing non-native species.
