= The Cinders =

Lava field in Utah, United States

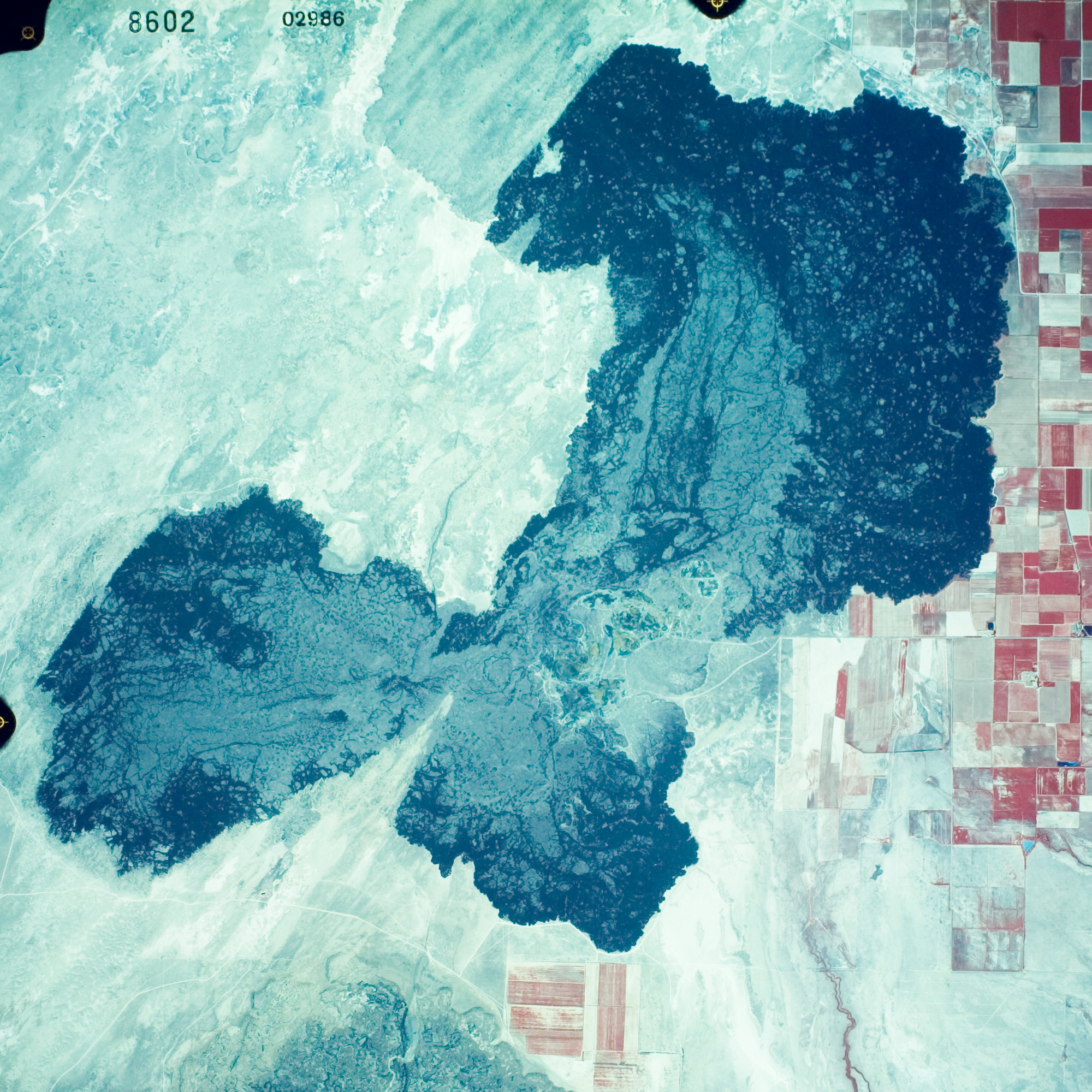
- 1981 air photo. Image is about 10.5 km wide.

Highest point
- Elevation: 4,940 ft (1,510 m)

Geography
- Location within Utah
- Country: United States
- State: Utah
- Region: Black Rock Desert volcanic field
- District: Millard County
- Range coordinates: 38°54′36″N 112°31′56″W
- Topo map(s): USGS Tabernacle Hill, UT

The Cinders is a lava field including a volcanic hill named Ice Springs craters in the west-central portion of Utah, United States. It is also known as the Ice Springs Volcanic Field.

== Geology ==
The Cinders are part of the Black Rock Desert volcanic field. The lava of The Cinders is basalt of late Holocene age. The basalt erupted from the vent at the Ice Springs craters less than 700 years ago (as of 2020). It is the youngest basalt flow in Utah.

To the south is a somewhat older lava flow surrounding Tabernacle Hill.

The basalt of the Cinders and Tabernacle hill was first mapped by geologists Grove Karl Gilbert and Israel Russell in 1890 (see map below).

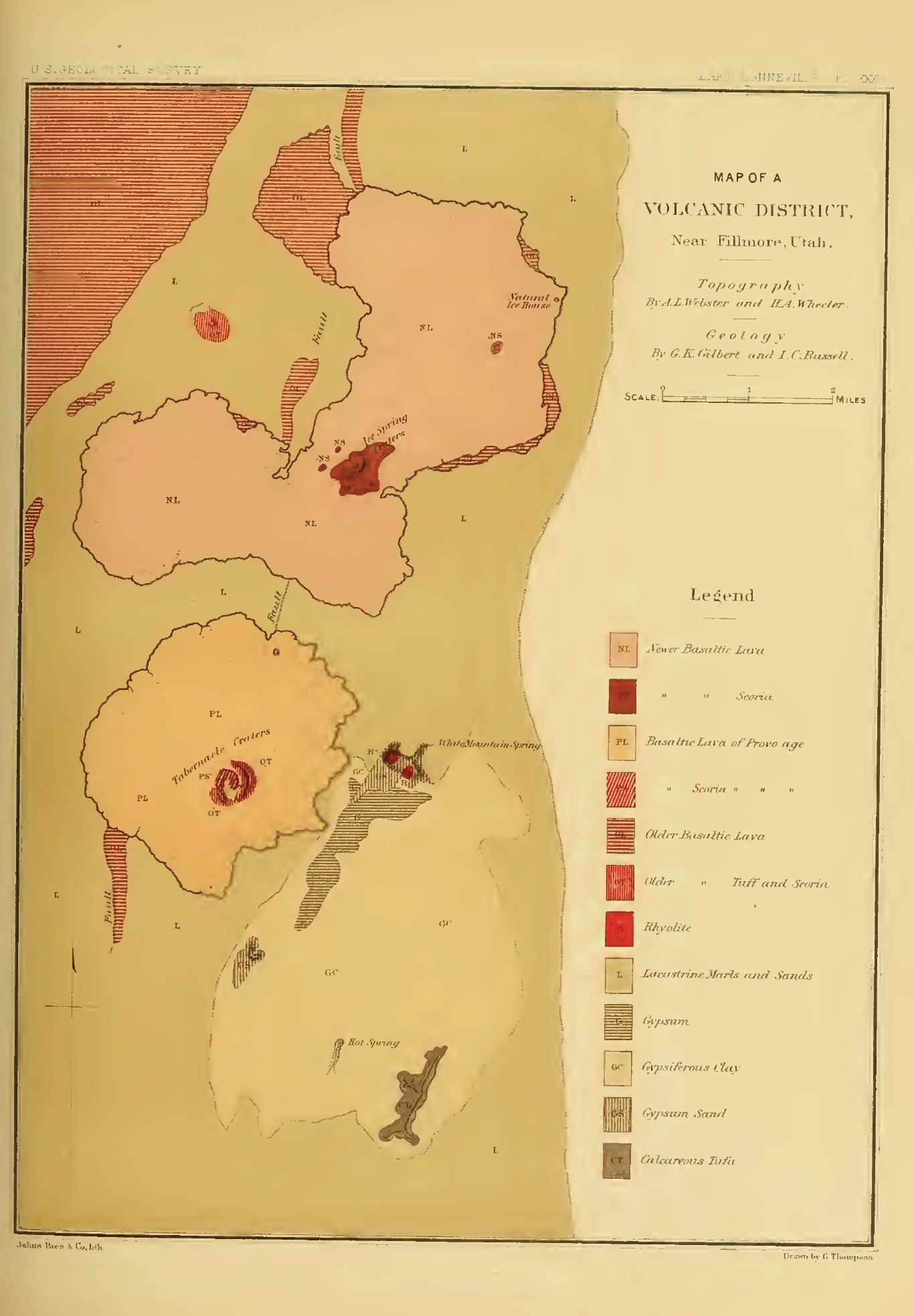
Gilbert and Russell's 1890 Map of the Volcanic District

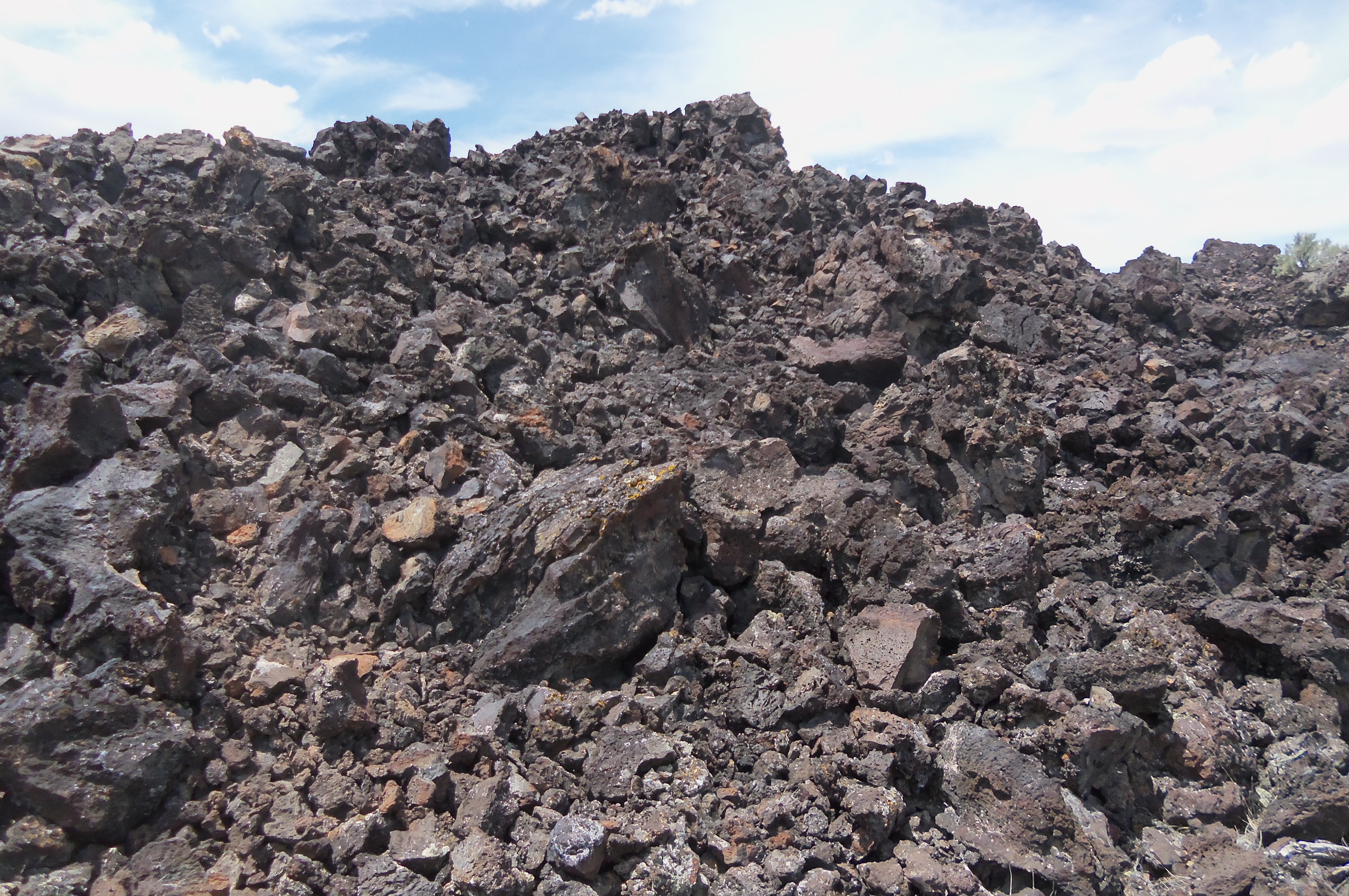
Ice Springs basalt, near the Ice Caves

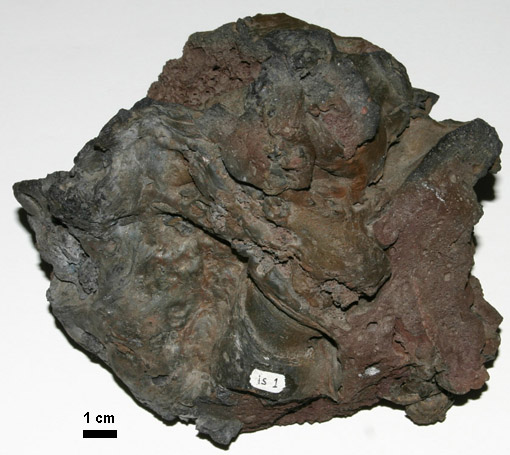
Sample of the basalt

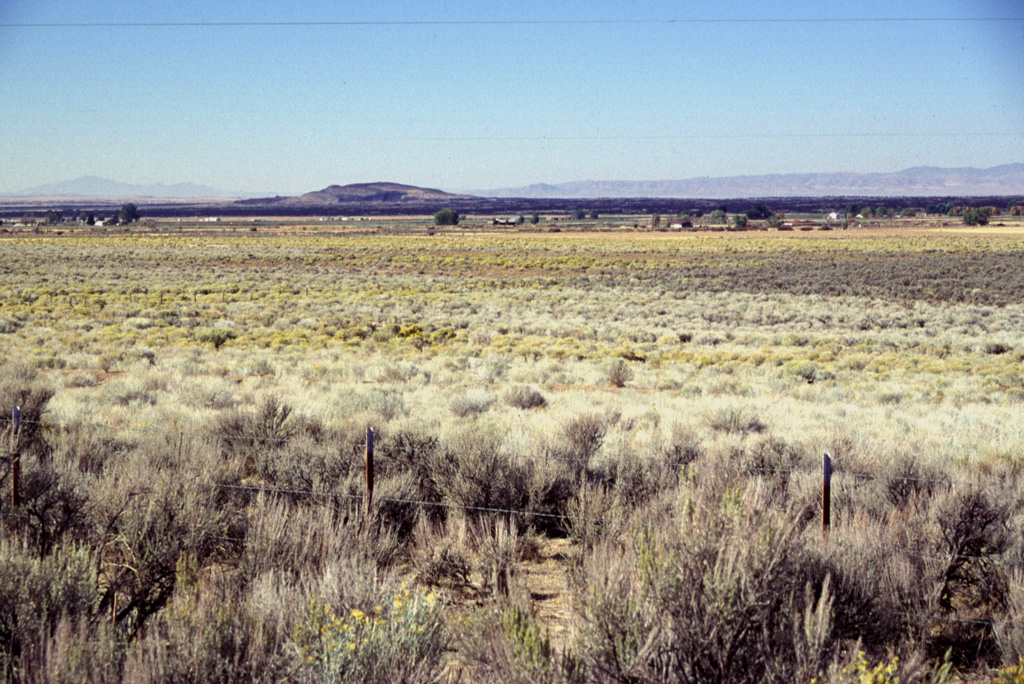
The Cinders, looking southwest towards the central cone

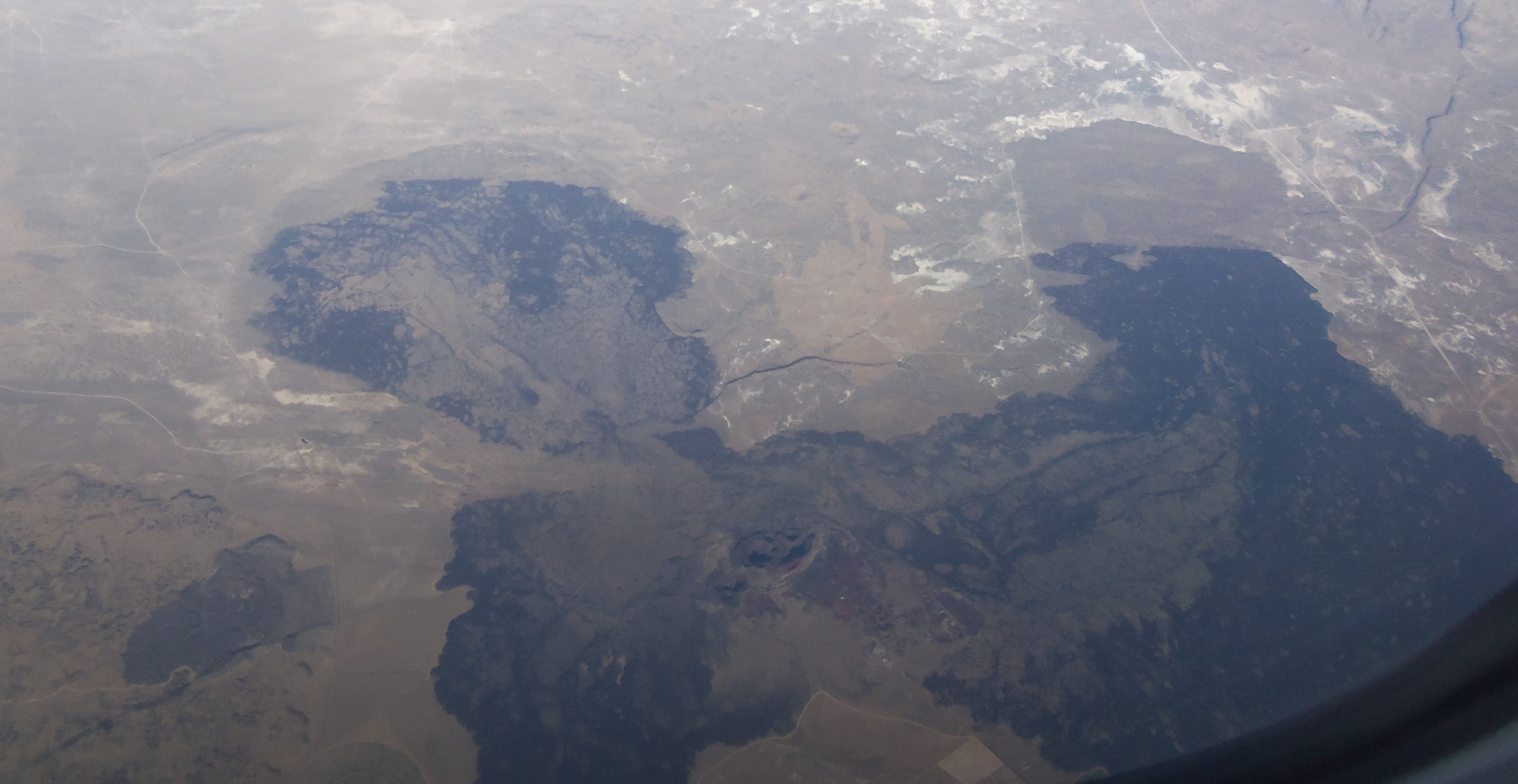
The Cinders in 2020
