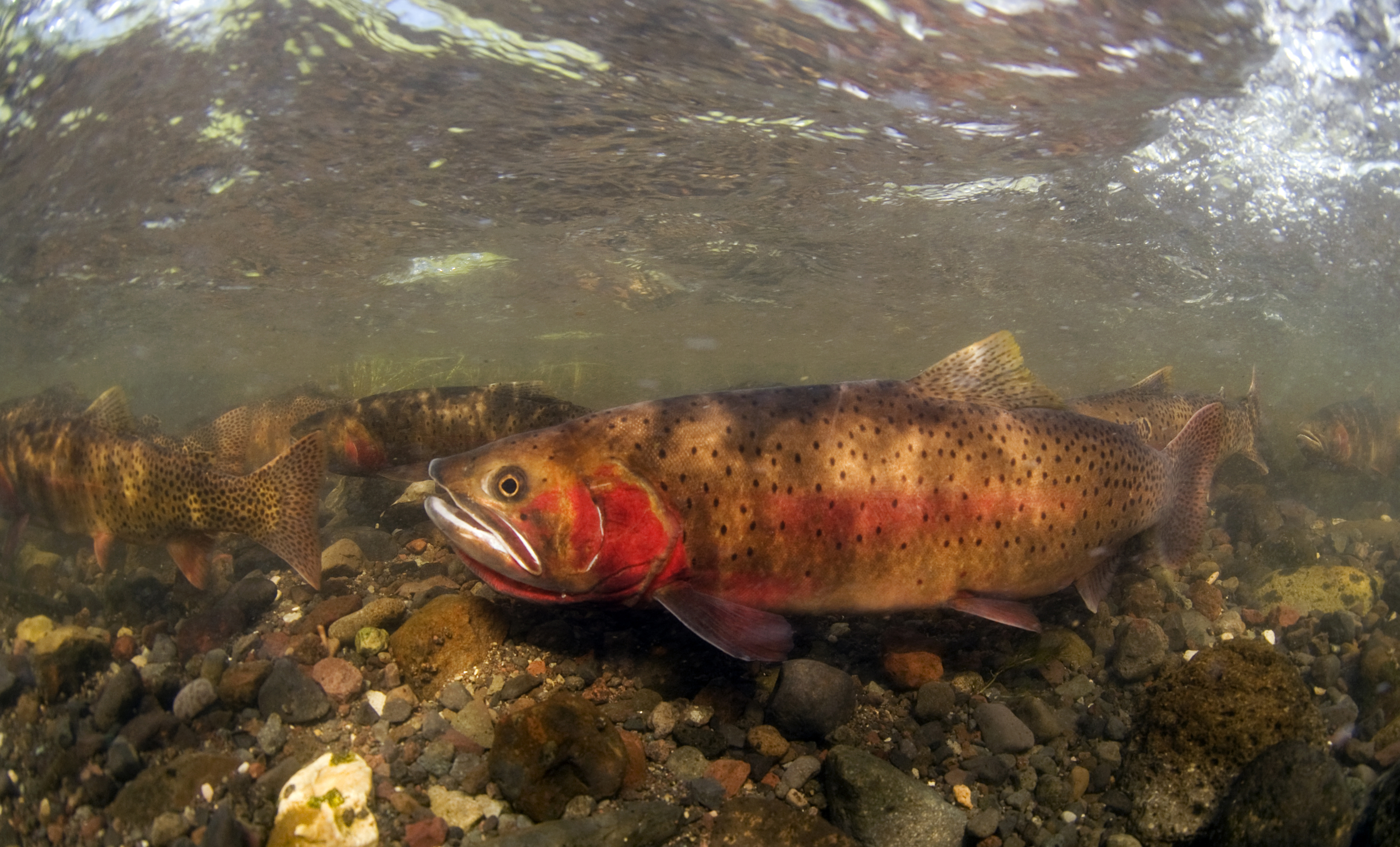

Conservation status
- Apparently Secure (NatureServe)

Scientific classification
- Kingdom: Animalia
- Phylum: Chordata
- Class: Actinopterygii
- Order: Salmoniformes
- Family: Salmonidae
- Genus: Oncorhynchus
- Species: O. virginalis
- Subspecies: O. v. bouvieri

Trinomial name
- Oncorhynchus virginalis bouvieri (Bendire, 1882)

= Yellowstone cutthroat trout =

Subspecies of fish

The Yellowstone cutthroat trout (Oncorhynchus virginalis bouvieri) is a subspecies of Rocky Mountain cutthroat trout (Oncorhynchus virginalis). It is a freshwater fish in the salmon family (family Salmonidae). Native only to a few U.S. states, their original range was upstream of Shoshone Falls on the Snake River and tributaries in Wyoming, also across the Continental Divide in Yellowstone Lake and in the Yellowstone River as well as its tributaries downstream to the Tongue River in Montana. The species is also found in Idaho, Utah and Nevada.

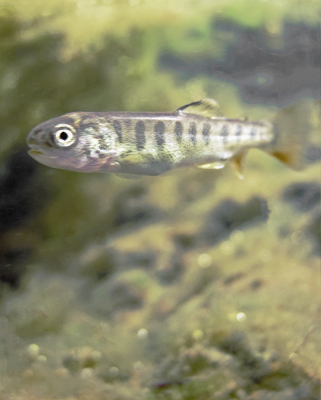
Yellowstone cutthroat fry

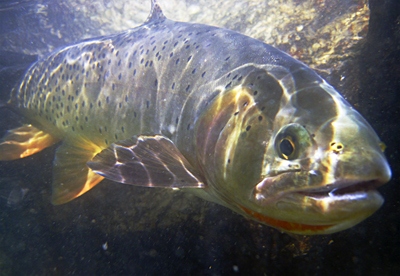
Yellowstone river cutthroat trout

It is believed that it got into Yellowstone River (which drains into Atlantic) from Snake River (which drains into Pacific) drainages through a small creek known as Parting of the Waters. It is one of the few aquatic species that has crossed a continental divide.

== Population threats ==
Their range has been reduced by overfishing and habitat destruction due to mining, grazing, and logging, and population densities have been reduced by competition with non-native brook, brown, and rainbow trout since these were introduced in the late 19th and early 20th centuries. However, the most serious current threats to the subspecies are interbreeding with introduced rainbow trout (resulting in cutbows) in the Greater Yellowstone ecosystem, the presence of lake trout in Yellowstone and Heart lakes in Yellowstone National Park which prey upon cutthroat trout to 15 inches in length, and several outbreaks of whirling disease in major spawning tributaries.

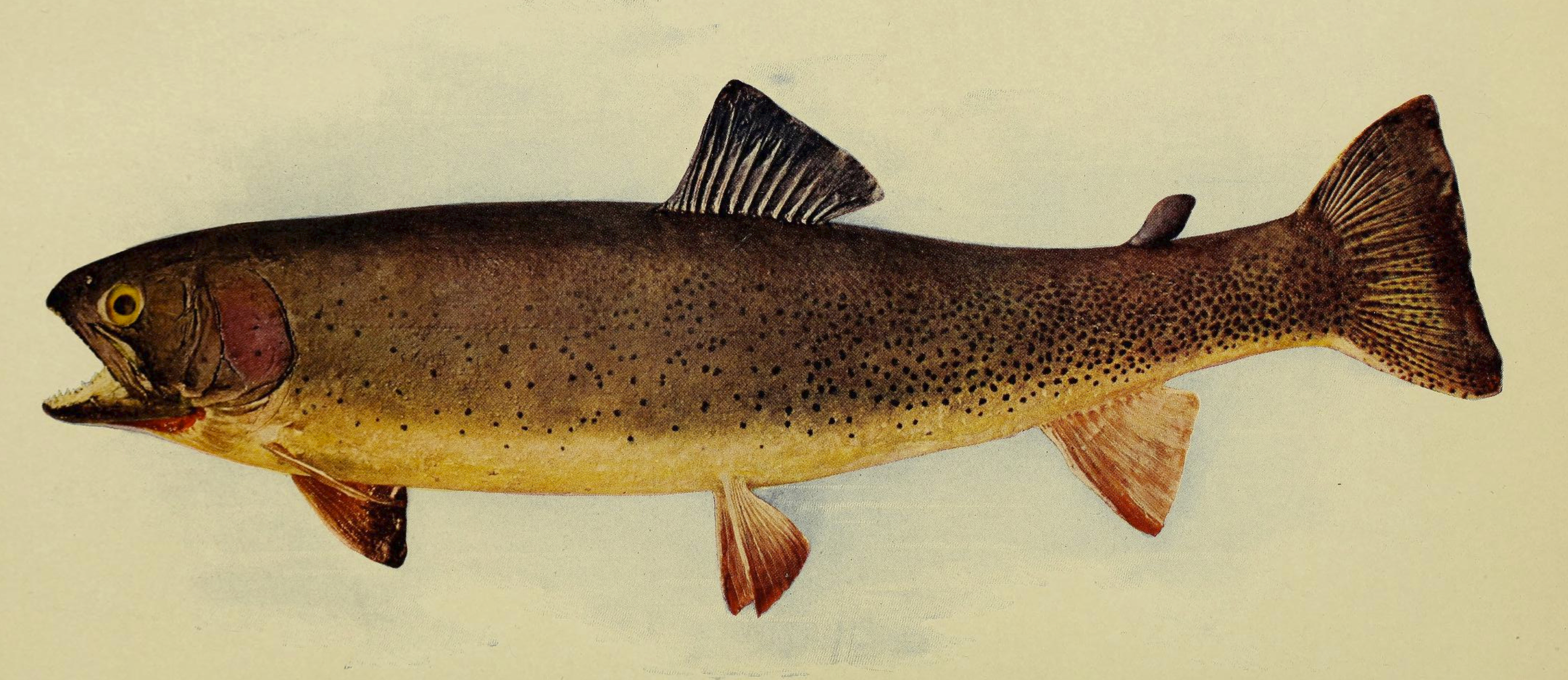
From Birds and nature, 1904

Although lake trout were established in Shoshone and Lewis lakes in the Snake River drainage from U.S. government stocking operations in 1890, they were never officially introduced into the Yellowstone River drainage and their presence there is probably the result of accidental or illegal introductions.

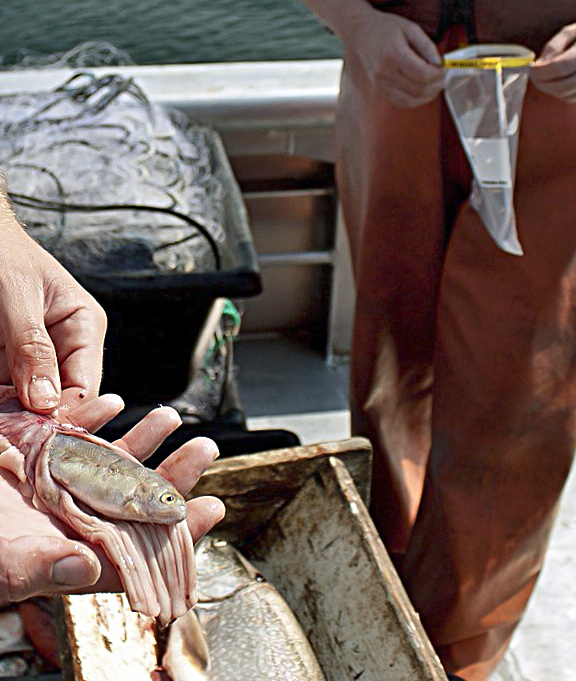
Yellowstone lake mackinaw removal

== See also ==
- Angling in Yellowstone National Park
- Ecology of the Rocky Mountains – Ecology of the Rocky Mountain range in North America
- Fish of Montana
- Fishing in Wyoming
- Snake River fine-spotted cutthroat trout – Subspecies of fish
