= Lake Bonneville =

Former pluvial lake in western North America

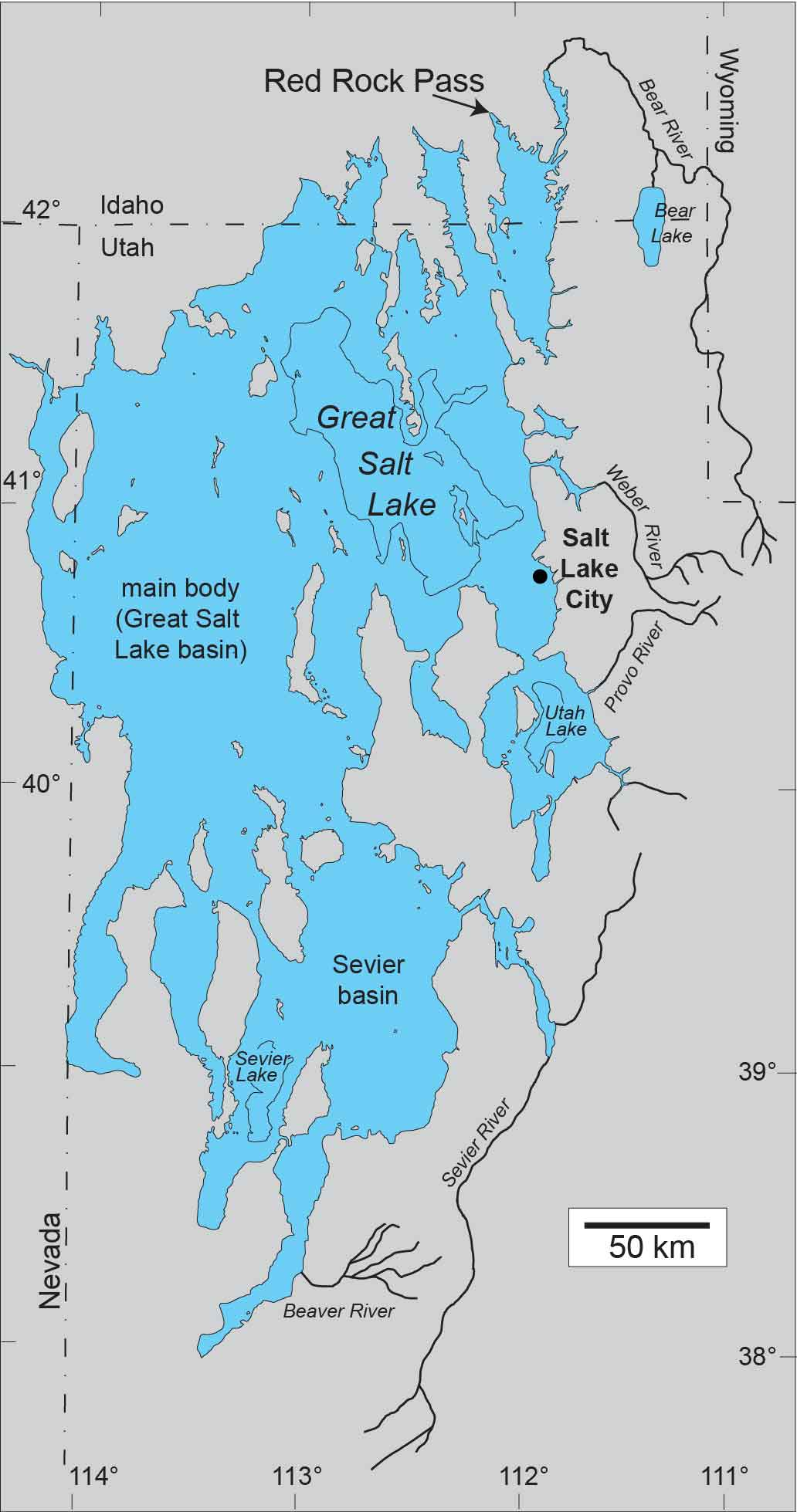
- Map of Lake Bonneville, showing the outline of the Bonneville shoreline, the highest level of the lake.

- Location within the United States
- Location: Utah, Idaho and Nevada
- Coordinates: 41°N 113°W
- Type: pluvial lake (a paleolake created by a change in water balance in the basin)
- Etymology: Benjamin Bonneville
- Surface area: ~20,000 sq mi (51,000 km^{2}) (at max. lake level)
- Max. depth: over 980 ft (300 m)

Lake Bonneville was the largest Late Pleistocene paleolake in the Great Basin of western North America. It was a pluvial lake that formed in response to an increase in precipitation and a decrease in evaporation as a result of cooler temperatures. The lake covered much of what is now western Utah and at its highest level extended into present-day Idaho and Nevada. Many other hydrographically closed basins in the Great Basin contained expanded lakes during the Late Pleistocene, including Lake Lahontan in northwestern Nevada.

== Geologic description ==
Lake Bonneville and other Late Pleistocene paleolakes in the Great Basin during the last major global glaciation. Lake Bonneville is shown in the context of western North America and the southern margins of the Laurentide and Cordilleran ice sheets. Note that some of the red arrows show floods in eastern Washington (from Lake Missoula) that were unrelated to the Bonneville flood.

Shorelines of Lake Bonneville are visible above Salt Lake City along the western front of the Wasatch Mountains and on other mountains throughout the Bonneville basin. These shorelines appear as shelves or benches that protrude from the mountainside above the valley floor, are visible on the ground from long distances and on satellite images, and have both depositional and erosional segments along their lengths. Three shorelines of Lake Bonneville that can be traced throughout the basin have been given names: Stansbury, Bonneville, and Provo. The Stansbury and Bonneville shorelines formed during the transgressive phase of Lake Bonneville; the Provo shoreline formed during the overflowing phase. Numerous other unnamed shorelines, which cannot be mapped everywhere in the basin, some of which formed during the transgressive phase and some during the regressive phase, are also present on piedmont slopes and alluvial fans. At its maximum, when Lake Bonneville was more than 980 ft (300 m) deep and almost 20,000 sq mi (51,000 km^{2}) in surface area, it covered almost as much area as modern Lake Michigan, although its shoreline was more complex with many islands and peninsulas. Great Salt Lake, Utah Lake, and Sevier Lake are the largest post-Bonneville lakes in the Bonneville basin.

== Causes of lake expansion and contraction ==
Lake Bonneville was not a proglacial lake although it formed between about 30,000 and 13,000 years ago, when glaciers at many places on Earth were expanded relative to today during the last major glaciation. For most of its existence (that is, during the transgressive plus regressive phases) Lake Bonneville had no river outlet and occupied a hydrographically closed basin. Changes in lake level were the result of changes in water balance caused by climate change (a simplified version of the water-balance equation is inputs equal outputs plus-or-minus storage changes). Storage changes are equal to volume changes, and changes in volume are correlated with changes in lake level. When inputs (e.g., precipitation; runoff in rivers) were greater than outputs (e.g., evaporation from the lake surface; evapotranspiration in the basin), lake level rose, and when outputs were greater than inputs, lake level fell. Changes in global atmospheric circulation led to changes in the water budget of Lake Bonneville and other lakes in the Great Basin of western North America. Mountain glaciers in the Bonneville drainage basin stored less than 5% of the water that Lake Bonneville held at its maximum and so even if all of the mountain glaciers in the basin melted at once and the water flowed into the lake (that did not happen since it took thousands of years for the mountain glaciers to melt, and Lake Bonneville was falling by that time), it would have had little effect on lake level. Lake Bonneville had no river connection with the huge North American ice sheets. While Lake Bonneville existed, the patterns of wave- and current-forming winds were not significantly affected by the Laurentide and Cordilleran ice sheets in northern North America.

== The name "Bonneville" and its discovery ==
Lake Bonneville was named by the geologist G.K. Gilbert after Benjamin Louis Eulalie de Bonneville (1796–1878), a French-born officer in the United States Army who was also a fur trapper and explorer in the American West.

While Captain Bonneveille led an expedition in the 1830s which entered modern-day Utah, Bonneville himself probably never saw Great Salt Lake or the Great Basin.

Captain Bonneville's adventures were popularized by Washington Irving in the 1880s.

G.K. Gilbert was a prominent geologists of the 19th Century, and his monumental work on Lake Bonneville, published in 1890, set the stage for scientific research on the paleolake. Gilbert was the first person to describe the major features of Lake Bonneville. However, many other early European and American explorers in the region recognized the shorelines of the ancient lake, such as Captain John C. Frémont in 1843. Even earlier, Father Silvestre Velez de Escalante in 1776 wrote in a journal entry after visiting Utah Lake: "This place, which we named Llano Salado, because we found some thin white shells there, seems to have once had a much larger lake than the present one."

Although a general description and understanding of Lake Bonneville has been established by the work of many people, research continues into many features of the paleolake.

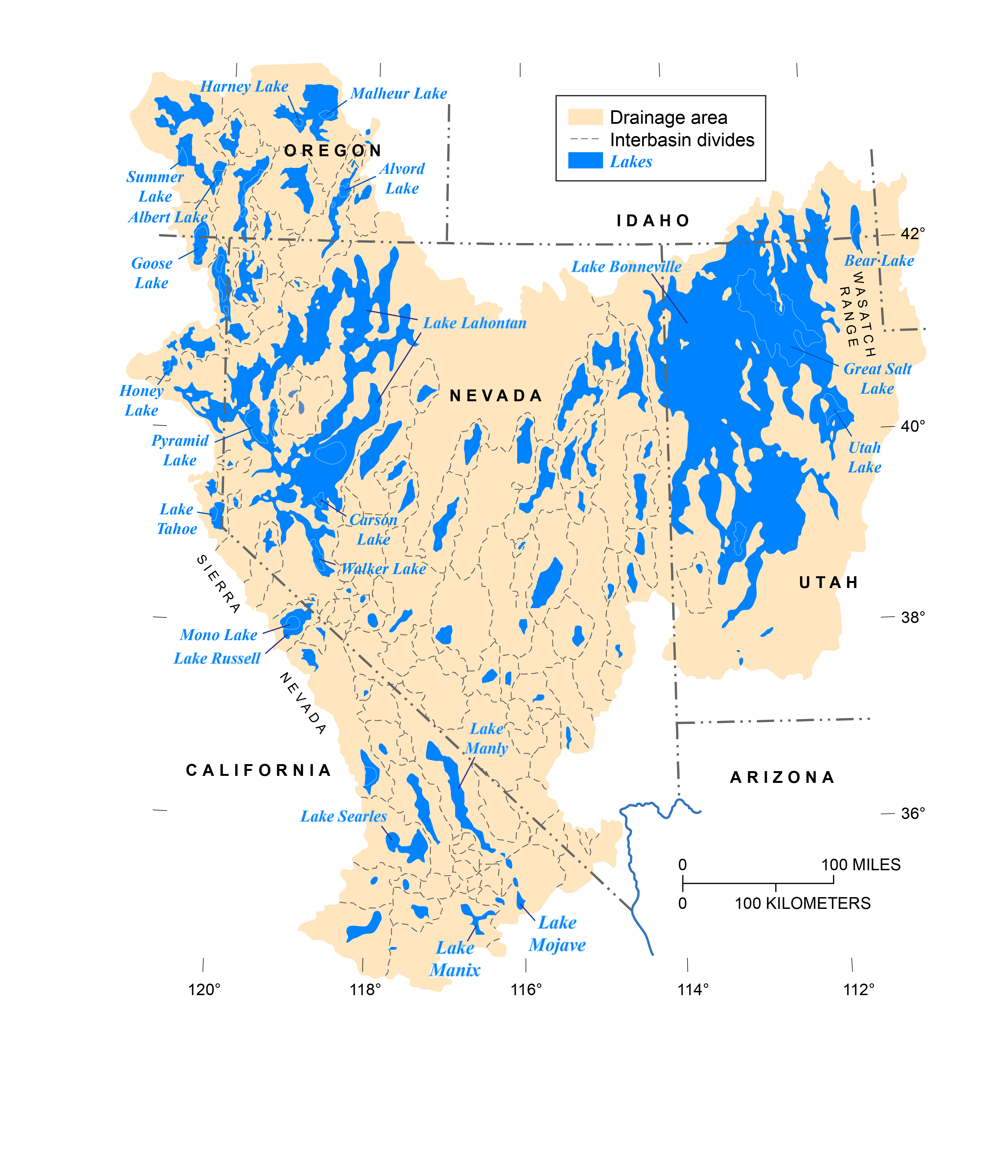
Map of Pleistocene lakes in the Great Basin of western North America.

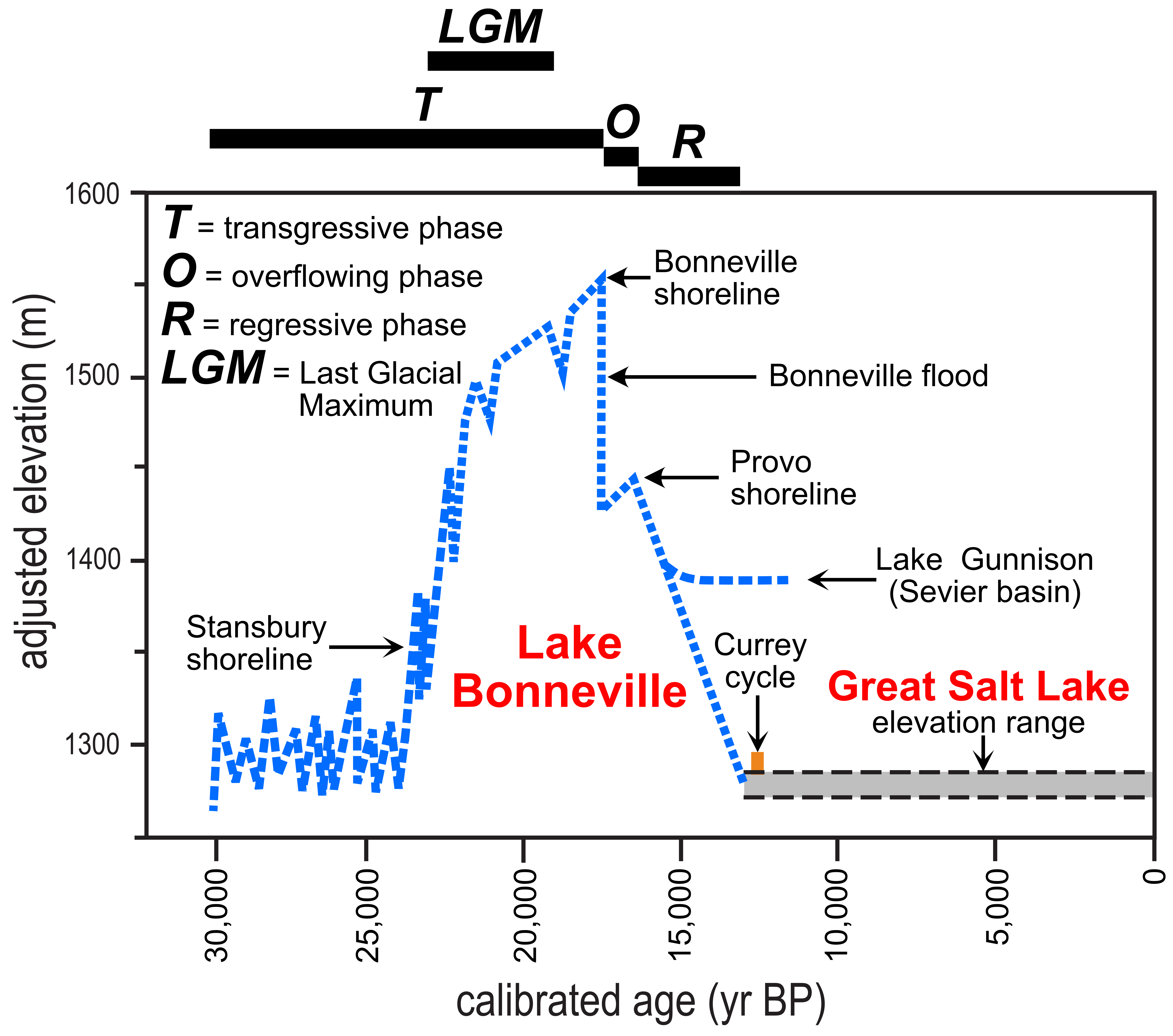
Chronology of Lake Bonneville. "Calibrated ages" are approximate calendar years before present (A.D. 1950). Elevations are adjusted for differential isostatic rebound in the basin.

== Geologic history ==
Lake Bonneville began to rise from elevations similar to those of modern Great Salt Lake about 30,000 years ago. During its early transgressive phase the lake fluctuated within a few 10s of meters of the level of modern Great Salt Lake, but after about 24,000 years ago it began a rapid rise to higher elevations, reaching its highest elevation (the Bonneville shoreline) about 17,500 years ago. During its transgressive phase in the closed basin (an endorheic basin), lake level oscillated because of changes in climate. At its highest level the lake had risen to the lowest point on its basin rim and had begun to overflow into the Snake River drainage basin near Red Rock Pass in what is now southeastern Idaho. The overflow, which would have begun as a trickle across the dam formed by the Marsh Creek alluvial fan, quickly evolved into a tremendous flood, the Bonneville flood, which charged down the Marsh Creek valley to the Portneuf River, into the Snake River and then into the Columbia River and Pacific Ocean. Groundwater sapping on the north slope of the Marsh Creek alluvial fan, which began long before the lake had reached its highest level, added to the instability and ultimate collapse of the fan-dam.

The Bonneville flood probably lasted less than a year, during which time almost 1,200 mi^{3} (5,000 km^{3}) of water flowed out of the lake basin with a maximum discharge of about 35,000,000 cu ft/s (1,000,000 m^{3}/s). Downcutting during the flood through the Marsh Creek alluvial-fan deposits and into the underlying Neogene sand, mud, and landslide debris, caused lake level to drop about 410 ft (125 m). River flow from the lake across the Red Rock Pass threshold and out of the lake basin continued non-catastrophically for at least 1000 years after the flood ended; the Provo shoreline formed during this overflowing phase. The Provo shoreline is distinguished from other shorelines of Lake Bonneville by its topographic position, strong development, and thick accumulations of microbialite (tufa). At the end of the overflowing phase, possibly as early as about 16,500 years ago, climate change and a shift to a negative water balance (more water evaporated from the surface of the lake than entered the lake by rivers, direct precipitation, or groundwater) caused the lake to return to its closed-basin status as it declined to lower levels during the regressive phase. By 13,000 years ago the lake had fallen to an elevation similar to the average elevation of modern Great Salt Lake. During the regressive phase lake level declined approximately 660 ft (200 m) in about 3500 years because of a change to warmer and drier climate; this was a lake-level decline of roughly 2/3 of the maximum depth of Lake Bonneville. Although Lake Bonneville and the Great Salt Lake are collectively one lake system, the name "Lake Bonneville" is applied to the lake during the period from 30,000 to 13,000 years ago, and the name "Great Salt Lake" since 13,000 years ago.

Lake Bonneville was anomalous in the long-term history of the basin. As the largest of four deep lakes in the basin during the past 800,000 years, Lake Bonneville plus the other three deep Pleistocene lakes, persisted for less than 10% of the period. The conditions experienced in the basin today are typical of over 90% of the past 800,000 years: a dry desert basin with a few scattered low-elevation lakes, the largest of which (Great Salt Lake) was hypersaline. For most of the time between the end of the youngest of the deep pre-Bonneville lakes (the Little Valley lake cycle, about 150,000 years ago) and the initial rise of Lake Bonneville about 30,000 years ago, the lake would have resembled modern Great Salt Lake in surface area and depth. A short episode of slightly higher lake levels during the Cutler Dam lake cycle occurred about 60,000 years ago; at this time a moderate-sized lake rose above the level of Great Salt Lake, but not as high as Lake Bonneville.

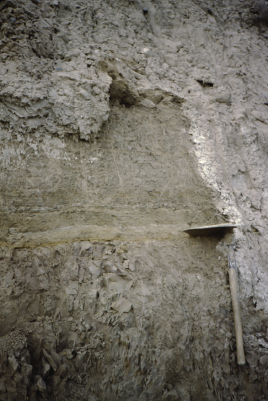
Bonneville flood bed in Lake Bonneville marl at an exposure in northern Utah. The base of the flood bed is at the level of the shovel blade. For scale, the shovel handle is about 20 in (50 cm) in length.

In his monograph on Lake Bonneville, G.K. Gilbert called the offshore deposits of Lake Bonneville the "White Marl". Although the name "White Marl" has not been used by the geologic community in a formal sense, the informal term "white marl" (or "Bonneville marl") is frequently employed. The Bonneville marl at locations far from sources of clastic sediment (gravel, sand, and silt), such as river deltas or active wave zones, is dominated by clay-sized particles of calcium carbonate that precipitated chemically from the lake water. Most of this calcium carbonate is in the form of the mineral calcite, but aragonite is common in Bonneville marl in the Sevier basin and in the lower part of the Bonneville marl stratigraphic section in the main body. Aragonite is the dominant carbonate mineral in sediments of post-Bonneville Great Salt Lake. Dropstones, probably mostly derived from shore ice, but possibly also from floating root balls, are common in the marl, and consist of granule- to boulder-sized clasts.

The Bonneville flood had catastrophic effects along the Snake River in what is now Idaho, but the influence of the flood can also be detected within the lake basin where a distinctive layer of sediment was deposited. The Bonneville flood bed can be identified in many surface exposures below the Provo shoreline and in sediment cores. The flood bed is characterized by an abrupt contact at its base between massive marl, which was deposited in the deepest water of Lake Bonneville, and finely laminated or ripple-laminated sandy marl, which was deposited by bottom currents during the flood. In places the Bonneville flood bed is composed of reworked ostracode shells. The contact at the top of the flood bed is transitional to massive marl that was deposited on the lake floor during Provo time. The flood bed is best developed and most obvious in straits between partially submerged mountain ranges or in places where bottom currents were strong as lake water flowed toward its outlet at Red Rock Pass. Because the Bonneville flood bed was deposited in less than a year, it is useful as a well-dated (~17,500 years ago) stratigraphic marker within the Bonneville deposits.

In previous publications the "Gilbert shoreline" was regarded as one of the prominent shorelines in the Bonneville basin, but this interpretation has been revised. The Gilbert episode (now referred to as the Currey cycle of Great Salt Lake) was a rise of Great Salt Lake about 50 ft (15 m) higher than modern average levels. Sediments deposited near the highest level of the Currey cycle are well dated at about 12,700 years BP. A mappable shoreline at the maximum level of the Currey cycle has not been recognized.

== Isostasy ==
The shorelines of Lake Bonneville have been warped by isostatic processes, as was recognized by Gilbert and extensively studied since Gilbert's day. Earth's crust subsided beneath the weight of the water while the lake existed, but when the lake evaporated and the water load was considerably reduced, the crust beneath the lake basin rebounded. As a result, the elevation of the Bonneville shoreline is 243 ft (74 m) higher in the Lakeside Mountains, elevation 5,335 ft (1,626 m), west of the Great Salt Lake near the center of the Lake Bonneville water load, than at Red Rock Pass, 5,092 ft (1,552 m), where the lake was very shallow. As an example of isostatic deformation of the shorelines, the elevation of the Bonneville shoreline near Salt Lake City is 5,203 ft (1,586 m), but on Antelope Island in the Great Salt Lake, the elevation of the same shoreline is 5,246 ft (1,599 m).

== Fossils, volcanic ashes, etc. ==
In addition to the abundant geological features produced by Lake Bonneville, such as shorelines and sediments, fossilized fish bones and scales reveal information about the physical and chemical characteristics of the paleolake. Pollen from plants that lived in the Bonneville basin is abundant in Bonneville marl. Invertebrate fossils in Lake Bonneville deposits include mollusks and ostracodes, and bones of extinct mammals are found in Pleistocene deposits in the Bonneville basin. Volcanic ashes in sediments of Lake Bonneville help with correlations and aid in deciphering lake history. Lake Bonneville shorelines, and those of other paleolakes on Earth, are good analogs for shorelines on other planets, such as Mars.

== See also ==
- List of prehistoric lakes
- Lake Lahontan
- Bonneville cutthroat trout: endemic to area formerly covered by Lake Bonneville
- Bonneville Salt Flats
- Western Interior Seaway
