= List of fishes of Idaho =

The following list of known freshwater fish species, subspecies, and hybrids occurring in the U.S. state of Idaho is taken from Wydoski and Whitney (2003). Some scientific names have been updated or corrected. Asterisks denote introduced fishes. The list includes several anadromous species.

== Petromyzontiformes ==
=== Family Petromyzontidae ===
- Pacific lamprey (Entosphenus tridentatus)

== Acipenseriformes ==
=== Family Acipenseridae ===
- White sturgeon (Acipenser transmontanus)

== Clupeiformes ==
=== Family Clupeidae ===
- American shad* (Alosa sapidissima)

== Cypriniformes ==
=== Family Catostomidae ===
- Longnose sucker (Catostomus catostomus)
- Bridgelip sucker (Catostomus columbianus)
- Largescale sucker (Catostomus macrocheilus)
- Mountain sucker (Catostomus platyrhynchus)
- Utah sucker (Catostomus ardens)
- Bluehead sucker (Catostomus discobolous)

=== Family Cyprinidae ===
- Chiselmouth (Acrocheilus alutaceus)
- Goldfish* (Carassius auratus)
- Lake chub (Couseius plumbeus)
- Grass carp* (Ctenopharyngodon idella)
- Common carp* (Cyprinus carpio)
- Utah chub (Gila atraria)
- Tui chub* (Gila bicolor)
- Leatherside chub (Lepidomeda copei)
- Peamouth (Mylocheilus caurinus)
- Spottail shiner* (Notropis hudsonius)
- Fathead minnow* (Pimephales promelas)
- Northern pikeminnow (Ptychocheilus oregonensis)
- Longnose dace (Rhinichthys cataractae)
- Leopard dace (Rhinichthys falcatus)
- Umatilla dace (Rhinichthys umatilla)
- Speckled dace (Rhinichthys osculus)
- Redside shiner (Richardsonius balteatus)
- Tench* (Tinca tinca)

== Cyprinodontiformes ==
=== Family Poeciliidae ===
- Mosquitofish* (Gambusia affinis)
- Guppy* (Poecilia reticulata)
- Green swordtail* (Xiphophorus helleri)
- Platy* (Xiphophorus ssp.)

== Esociformes ==
=== Family Esocidae ===
- Northern pike* (Esox lucius)
- Tiger muskellunge* (E. lucius x E. masquinongy) hybrid

== Perciformes ==
=== Family Centrarchidae ===
- Green sunfish* (Lepomis cyanellus)
- Bluegill* (Lepomis macrochirus)
- Pumpkinseed* (Lepomis gibbosus)
- Warmouth* (Lepomis gulosus)
- Smallmouth bass* (Micropterus dolomieui)
- Largemouth bass* (Micropterus salmoides)
- White crappie* (Pomoxis annularis)
- Black crappie* (Pomoxis nigromaculatus)

=== Family Cichlidae ===
- Mozambique tilapia* (Tilapia mozambica)
- Redbelly tilapia* (Tilapia zilli)
- Convict cichlid* (Cichlasoma nigrofasciatum)

=== Family Percidae ===
- Yellow perch* (Perca flavescens)
- Walleye* (Sander vitreus)
- Sauger* (Sander canadensis)

== Percopsiformes ==
=== Family Percopsidae ===
- Sand roller (Percopsis transmontana)

== Gadiformes ==
=== Family Gadidae ===
- Burbot (Lota lota)

== Salmoniformes ==
=== Family Salmonidae ===
- Lake whitefish* (Coregonus clupeaformis)
- Cutthroat trout (Oncorhynchus clarki)
  - Yellowstone cutthroat trout (Oncorhynchus clarki bouvieri)
  - Westslope cutthroat trout (Oncorhynchus clarki lewisi)
  - Bonneville cutthroat trout/Bear Lake cutthroat trout (Oncorhynchus clarki utahi)
  - Snake River fine-spotted cutthroat trout (Oncorhynchus clarki behnkei)
  - Lahontan cutthroat trout (Oncorhynchus clarki henshawi)
- Coho salmon* (Oncorhynchus kisutch)
- Chinook salmon (Oncorhynchus tshawytscha)
- Sockeye salmon/Kokanee salmon (Oncorhynchus nerka)
- Rainbow trout (Oncorhynchus mykiss)
  - Columbia River redband trout (Oncorhynchus mykiss gairdneri) (anadromous forms known as Steelhead)
- Golden trout* (Oncorhynchus mykiss aguabonita)
- Bear Lake whitefish (Prosopium abyssicola)
- Pygmy whitefish (Prosopium coulteri)
- Bonneville cisco (Prosopium gemmiferum)
- Bonneville whitefish (Prosopium spilonotus)
- Mountain whitefish (Prosopium williamsoni)
- Atlantic salmon* (Salmo salar)
- Brown trout* (Salmo trutta)
- Blueback trout* (Salvelinus alpinus oquassa)
- Bull trout (Salvelinus confluentus)
- Brook trout* (Salvelinus fontinalis)
- Lake trout* (Salvelinus namaycush)
- Arctic grayling* (Thymallus arcticus)

== Scorpaeniformes ==
=== Family Cottidae ===
- Mottled sculpin (Cottus bairdi)
- Paiute sculpin (Cottus beldingi)
- Slimy sculpin (Cottus cognatus)
- Shorthead sculpin (Cottus confusus)
- Bear Lake sculpin (Cottus extensus)
- Shoshone sculpin (Cottus greenei)
- Wood River sculpin (Cottus leipomus)
- Torrent sculpin (Cottus rhotheus)
- Cedar sculpin (Cottus schitsuumsh)

== Siluriformes ==
=== Family Ictaluridae ===
- Black bullhead* (Ameiurus melas)
- Yellow bullhead* (Ameiurus natalis)
- Brown bullhead* (Ameiurus nebulosus)
- Blue catfish* (Ictalurus furcatus)
- Channel catfish* (Ictalurus punctatus)
- Tadpole madtom* (Noturus gyrinus)
- Flathead catfish* (Pylodictis olivaris)
