= Freshwater fish =

Fish that mostly live in freshwater

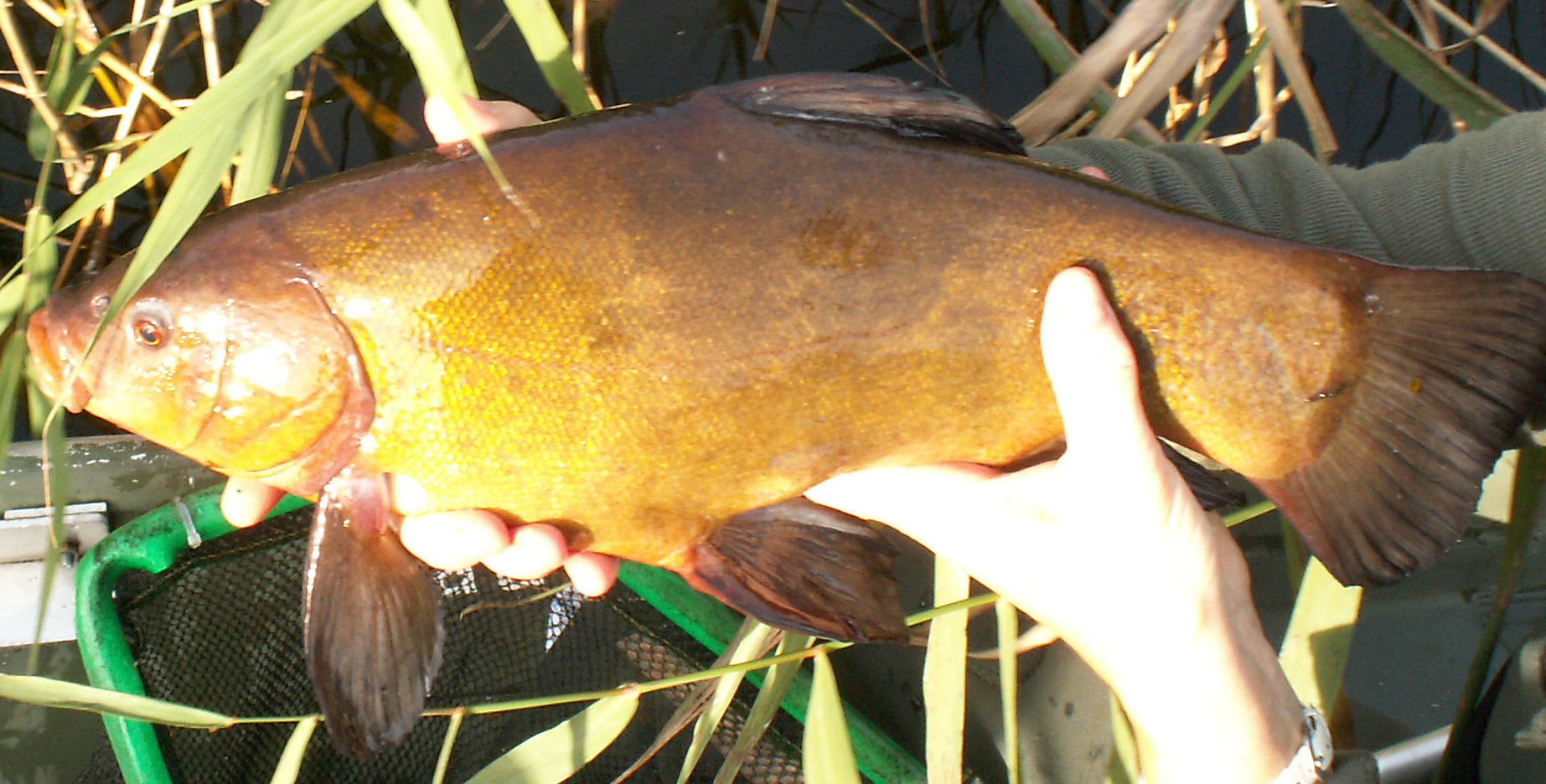
Tench are common freshwater fish throughout temperate Eurasia.

Freshwater fish are fish species that spend some or all of their lives in bodies of fresh water such as rivers, lakes, ponds and inland wetlands, where the salinity is less than 1.05%. These environments differ from marine habitats in many ways, especially the difference in levels of osmolarity. To survive in fresh water, fish need a range of physiological adaptations.

41.24% of all known species of fish are found in fresh water. This is primarily due to the rapid speciation that the scattered habitats make possible. When dealing with ponds and lakes, one might use the same basic models of speciation as when studying island biogeography.

== Physiology ==
Freshwater fish differ physiologically from saltwater fish in several respects. Their gills must be able to diffuse dissolved gases while keeping the electrolytes in the body fluids inside. Their scales reduce water diffusion through the skin: freshwater fish that have suffered too much scale loss will die. They also have well-developed kidneys to reclaim salts from body fluids before excretion.

== Migratory fish ==
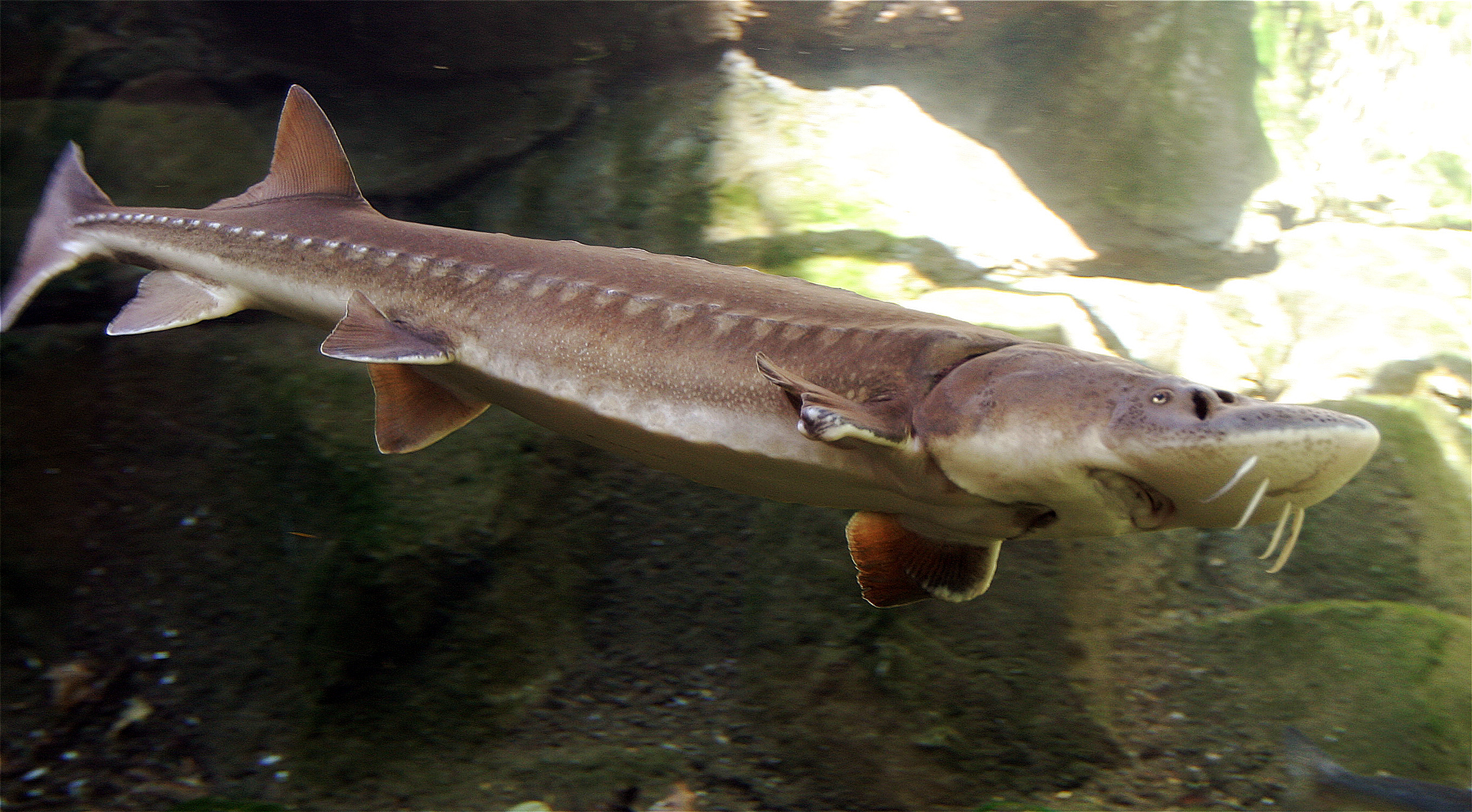
Sturgeon are found both in anadromous and fresh water stationary forms

Many species of fish do reproduce in freshwater, but spend most of their adult lives in the sea. These are known as anadromous fish, and include, for instance, salmon, trout, sea lamprey and three-spined stickleback. Some other kinds of fish are, on the contrary, born in salt water, but live most of or parts of their adult lives in fresh water; for instance the eels. These are known as catadromous fish.

Species migrating between marine and fresh waters need adaptations for both environments; when in salt water they need to keep the bodily salt concentration on a level lower than the surroundings, and vice versa. Many species solve this problem by associating different habitats with different stages of life. Both eels, anadromous salmoniform fish and the sea lamprey have different tolerances in salinity in different stages of their lives.

== Classification ==
=== Salt tolerance ===
Freshwater fish are traditionally divided into two divisions proposed by George S. Myers in 1938:

- Primary division freshwater fish are strictly limited to freshwater. They cannot survive in saltwater for any significant length of time and cannot disperse across marine water.
- Secondary division freshwater fish normally inhabit freshwater, but can survive in brackish and saltwater for some time. They may enter saltwater voluntarily and disperse across marine water.

A third group, peripheral freshwater fish, are fish which normally live in marine water but may enter and survive for some time in freshwater. This concept was introduced by John Treadwell Nichols in 1928.

=== Temperature ===
Among fishers in the United States, freshwater fish species are usually classified by the water temperature in which they survive. The water temperature affects the amount of oxygen available as cold water contains more oxygen than warm water.

- Coldwater fish species survive in the coldest temperatures, preferring a water temperature of 50 to 60 °F (10–16 °C). In North America, air temperatures that result in sufficiently cold water temperatures are found in the northern United States, Canada, and in the southern United States at high elevation. Common coldwater fish include brook trout, rainbow trout, and brown trout.
- Coolwater fish species prefer water temperature between the coldwater and the long warmwater species, around 60 to 80 °F (16–27 °C). They are found throughout North America except for the southern portions of the United States. Common coolwater species include muskellunge, northern pike, walleye, and yellow perch.
- Warmwater fish species can survive in a wide range of conditions, preferring a water temperature around 80 °F (27 °C). Warmwater fish can survive cold winter temperatures in northern climates, but thrive in warmer water. Common warmwater fish include catfish, largemouth bass, bluegill, crappies, and many other species from the family Centrarchidae.

== Status ==
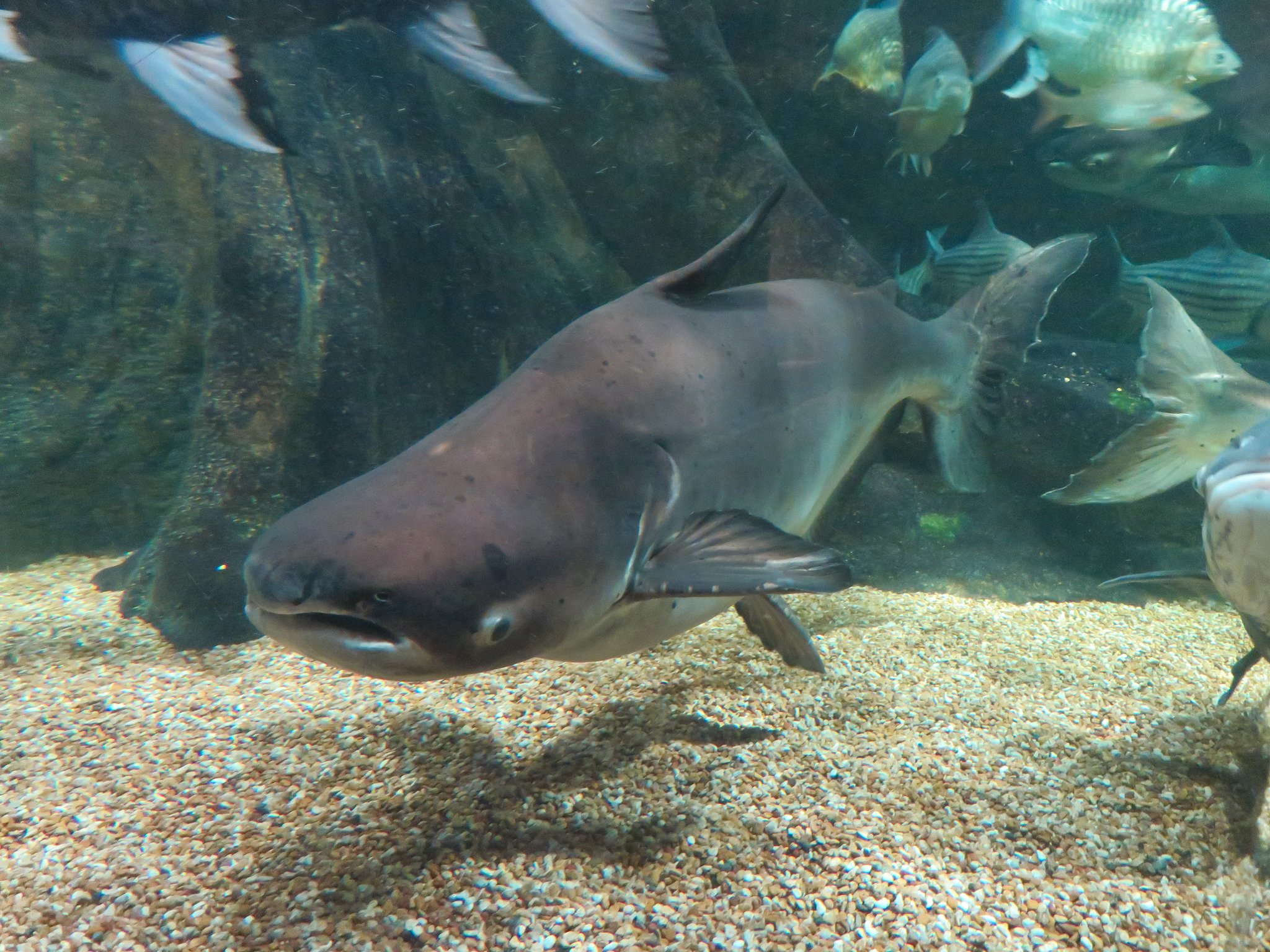
The critically endangered Mekong giant catfish

In 2021, a group of conservation organizations estimated that one-third of the world's freshwater fish species were at risk of extinction. A global assessment of freshwater fishes estimates an average decline of 83% in populations between 1970 and 2014. The protection of 30% of Earth's surfaces by 2030 may encompass freshwater habitat and help protect these threatened species.

There is an increasing trend in freshwater fish for local taxonomic, functional, and phylogenetic richness in more than half of the world's rivers. This increase in local diversity is primarily explained by anthropogenic species introductions that compensate for or even exceed extinctions in most rivers.

=== PFAS contamination ===
A study and an interactive map by EWG using its results show freshwater fish in the U.S. ubiquitously contain high levels of harmful PFAS, with a single serving typically significantly increasing the blood PFOS level.

=== North America ===
About four in ten North American freshwater fish are endangered, according to a pan-North American study, the main cause being human pollution. The number of fish species and subspecies to become endangered has risen from 40 to 61, since 1989. For example, the Bigmouth Buffalo is now the oldest age-validated freshwater fish in the world, and its status urgently needs reevaluation in parts of its endemic range.

=== China ===
About 2/3 of the total freshwater fisheries in China are in the Yangtze Basin. Many Yangtze fish species have declined drastically and 65 were recognized as threatened in the 2009 Chinese red list. The Chinese paddlefish, once common to the Yangtze River, is one of a number of extinctions to have taken place due to the degradation of the Yangtze, alongside that of the wild Yangtze sturgeon.

== Threats ==
=== Habitat destruction ===
Intentional anthropogenic reconstruction and rerouting of waterways impacts stream flow, water temperature, and more, impacting normal habitat functionality. Dams not only interrupt linear water flow and cause major geological channel shifts, but also limit the amount of water available to fishes in lakes, streams and rivers and have the potential to change the trophic structure because of these alterations of the habitat and the limitations to movement and connectivity.

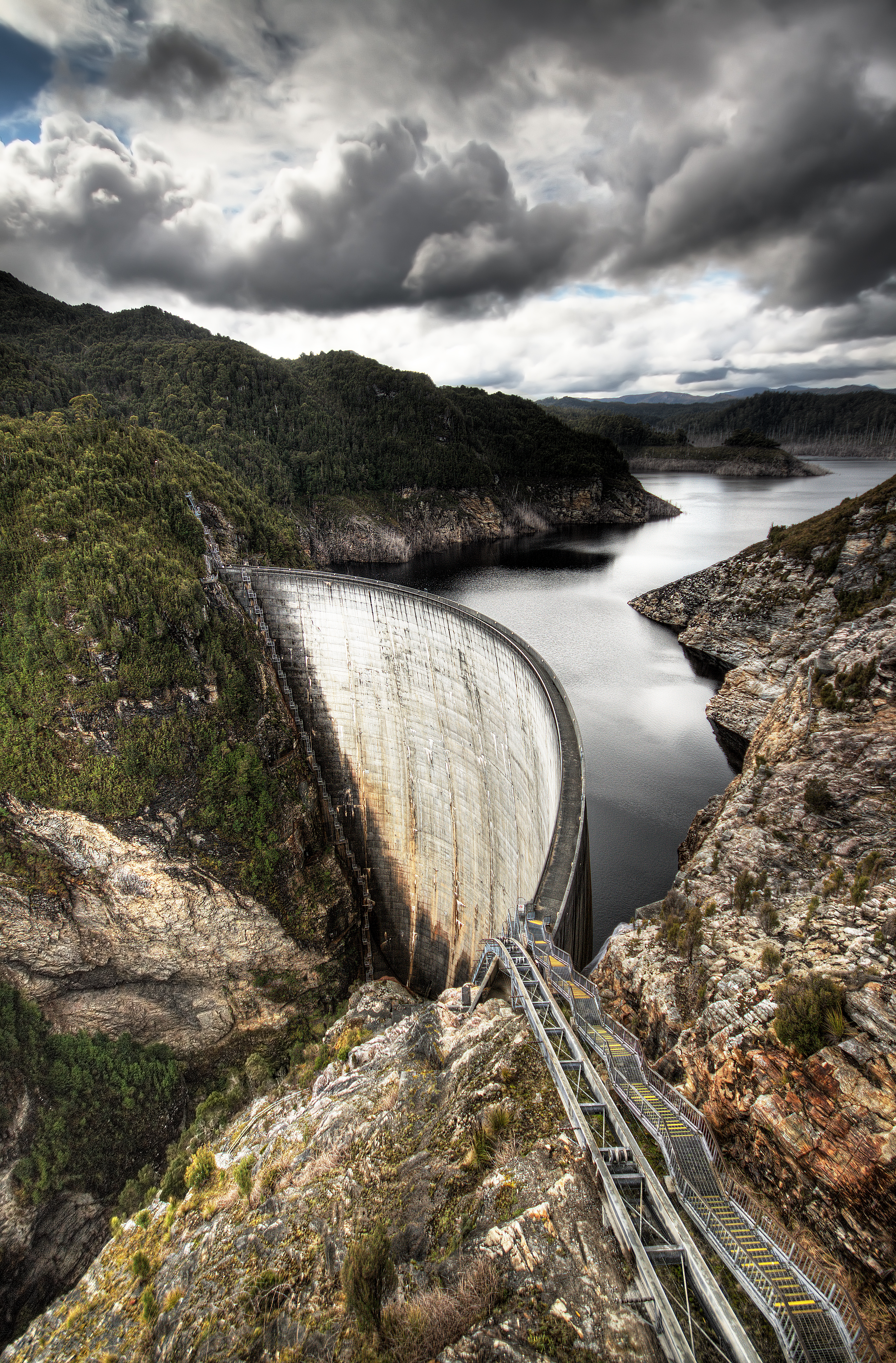
Dams can create issues for freshwater habitats.

Unnatural water flow below dams causes immense habitat degradation, reducing viable options for aquatic organisms. Upstream migration is hindered by the dam structure and can cause population declines as fishes don't have access to normal feeding and/or spawning grounds. Dams tend to affect upstream species richness, that is, the number of fish species in the ecological community. Additionally, dams can cause the isolation of fish populations, and the lack of connectivity creates possible problems for inbreeding and low genetic diversity. The loss of connectivity impacts the structure of community assemblies and increases the fragmentation of habitats, which can compound existing problems for vulnerable species.

Temperature alterations are another unintended consequence of dam and land use projects. Temperature is a vital part of aquatic ecosystem stability, so changes to stream and river water temperature can have large impacts on biotic communities. Many aquatic larvae use thermal cues to regulate their life cycles, mostly notably here, insects. Insects are a large part of most fish diets, so this can pose a great dietary problem. Temperature can cause changes in fish behavior and distribution habits as well by increasing their metabolic rates and thus their drive to spawn and feed.

Linear systems are more easily fragmented and connectivity in aquatic ecosystems is vital. Freshwater fishes are particularly vulnerable to habitat destruction because they reside in small bodies of water which are often very close to human activity and thus easily polluted by trash, chemicals, waste, and other agents which are harmful to freshwater habitats.

Land use changes cause major shifts in aquatic ecosystems. Deforestation can change the structure and sedimentary composition of streams, which impacts the habitat functionality for many fish species and can reduce species richness, evenness, and diversity. Agriculture, mining, and basic infrastructural building can degrade freshwater habitats. Fertilizer runoffs can create excess nitrogen and phosphorus which feed massive algae blooms that block sunlight, limit water oxygenation, and make the habitat functionally unsustainable for aquatic species. Chemicals from mining and factories make their way into the soil and go into streams via runoff. More runoff makes its way into streams since paved roads, cement, and other basic infrastructure do not absorb materials, and all the harmful pollutants go directly into rivers and streams. Fish are very sensitive to changes in water pH, salinity, hardness, and temperature which can all be affected by runoff pollutants and indirect changes from land use. Freshwater fish face extinction due to habitat loss, overfishing, and "forever chemicals." Conservation efforts, sustainable practices, and awareness are crucial in maintaining fish populations and species diversity.

=== Exotic species ===
An exotic (or non-native) species is defined as a species that does not naturally occur in a certain area or ecosystem. This includes eggs and other biological material associated with the species. Non-native species are considered invasive if they cause ecological or economic injury.

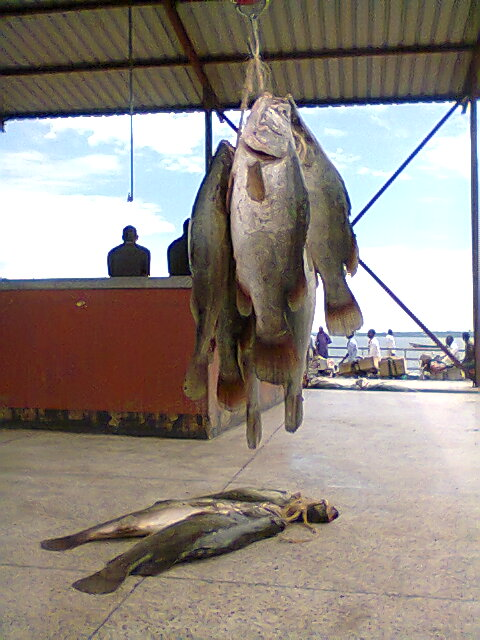
Nile perch are popular sport fish and important to commercial fisheries in the African Great Lakes.

The introduction of exotic fish species into ecosystems is a threat to many endemic populations. The native species struggle to survive alongside exotic species which decimate prey populations or outcompete indigenous fishes. High densities of exotic fish are negatively correlated with native species richness. Because the exotic species is suddenly introduced to a community, it does not have any established predators or prey. The exotic species then have a survival advantage over endemic organisms.

One such example is the destruction of the endemic cichlid population in Lake Victoria via the introduction of the predatory Nile perch (Lates niloticus). Although the exact time is unknown, in the 1950s the Ugandan Game and Fisheries Department covertly introduced the Nile perch into Lake Victoria, possibly to improve sport fishing and boost the fishery. In the 1980s, the Nile perch population saw a large increase which coincided with a great increase in the value of the fishery. This surge in Nile perch numbers restructured the lake's ecology. The endemic cichlid population, known to have around 500 species, was cut almost in half. By the 1990s, only three species of sport fish were left to support the once multispecies fishery, two of which were invasive. More recent research has suggested that remaining cichlids are recovering due to the recent surge in Nile perch commercial fishing, and the cichlids that are left have the greatest phenotypic plasticity and are able to react to environmental changes quickly.

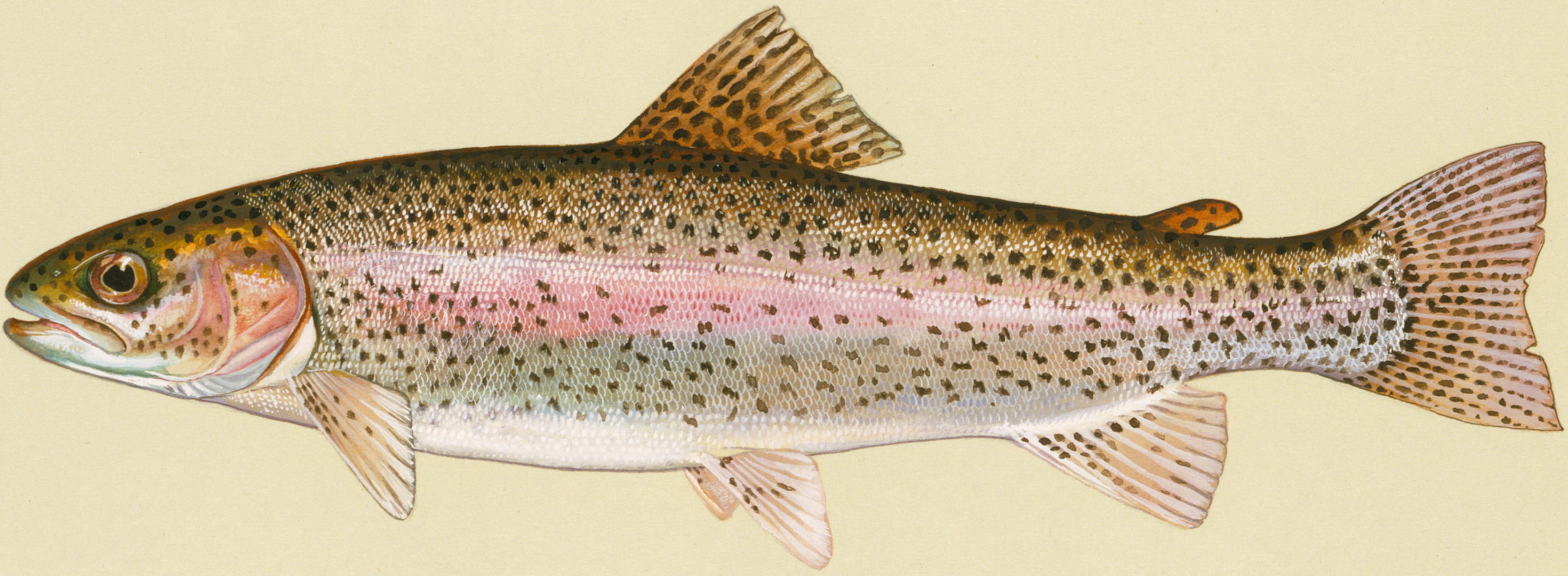
The rainbow trout is an invasive species in many ecosystems.

The introduction of the rainbow trout (Oncorhynchus mykiss) in the late 19th century resulted in the extinction of the yellowfin cutthroat trout (Oncorhynchus clarkii macdonaldi) found only in the Twin Lakes of Colorado, USA. The yellowfin cutthroat trout was discovered in 1889 and was recognized as a subspecies of the cutthroat trout (Oncorhynchus clarkii). The rainbow trout was introduced to Colorado in the 1880s. By 1903, the yellowfin cutthroat trout stopped being reported. It is now presumed extinct. The rainbow trout is invasive worldwide, and there are multiple efforts to remove them from their non-native ecosystems.

Both species are among the "100 of the World's Worst Invasive Alien Species," as determined by the IUCN Invasive Species Specialist Group based on their effect on anthropogenic activities, environmental biodiversity and their ability to act as a case study for important ecological issues.

==== Hybridization ====
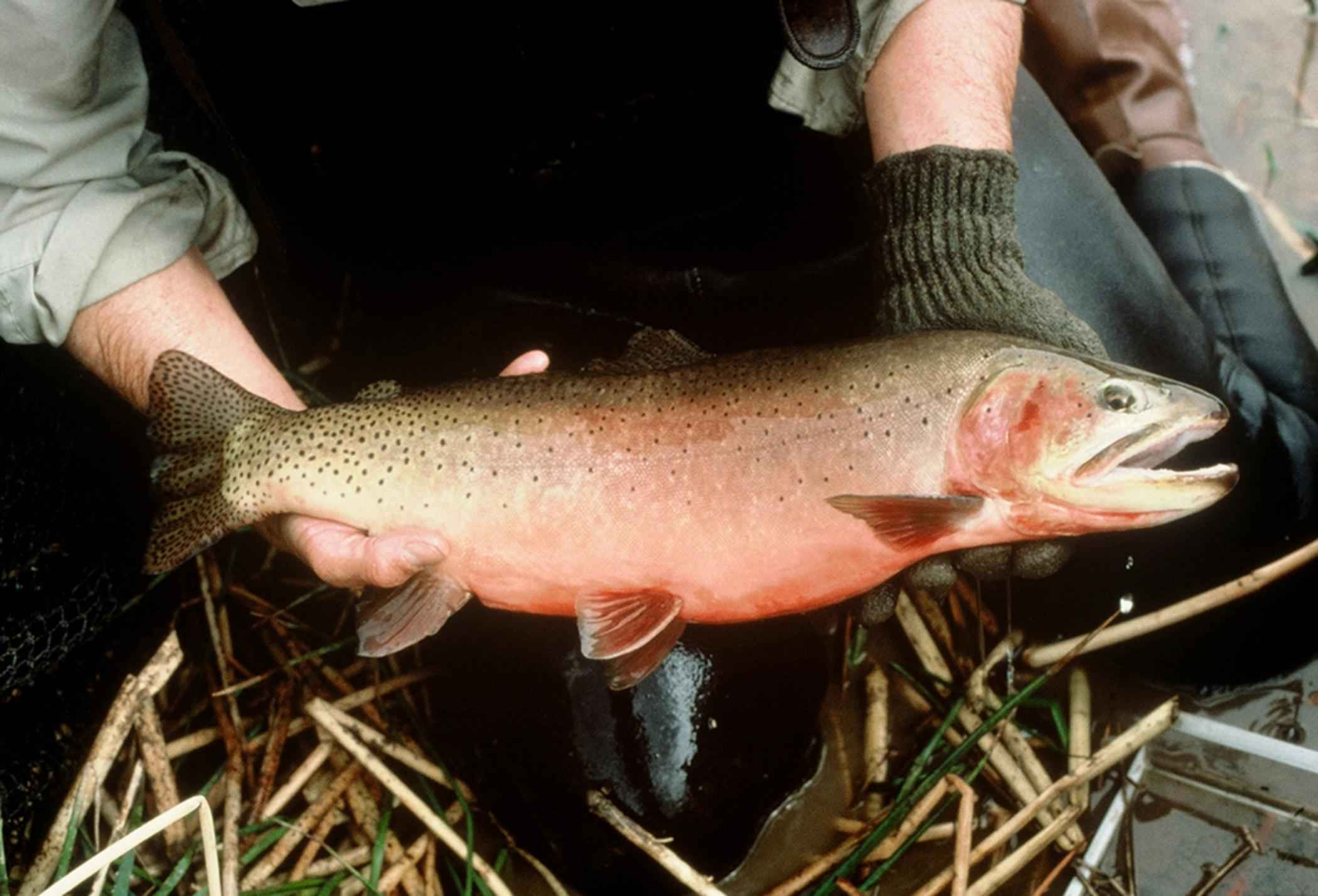
Greenback cutthroat trout hybridize with rainbow trout to produce hybrid "cutbows"

Hybridization involves the mating of two genetically different species (interspecific hybridization). It is dangerous for native species to hybridize because hybrid phenotypes may have better fitness and outcompete the two parent species and/or other fishes in the ecosystem. This could irreversibly compromise the genetic identity of one or both of the parent species and even drive them to extinction if their range is limited.

The rainbow trout discussed above hybridized with the native greenback cutthroat trout (Oncorhynchus clarkii stomias), causing their local extinction in the Twin Lakes area of Colorado as their hybrid "cutbows" became more prevalent. The rainbow trout has been reported to hybridize with at least two other salmonid species. Additionally, the cichlids in Lake Victoria evolved over 700 unique species in only 150,000 years and are theorized to have done so via ancient hybridization events which led to speciation.

== See also ==
- Freshwater Biology – Scientific study of freshwater ecosystems and biology
- Freshwater fish in the Philippines
- Freshwater fish of Australia
- Freshwater fish of Barbados
- Freshwater fish of India
- Freshwater fish of Ireland
- Freshwater fish of Malaysia
- Freshwater fish of the United States: Idaho, Maryland, Oklahoma, Oregon, Washington, West Virginia, plus a List of official and unofficial fishes by state
- Lake ecosystems
- List of common fish names
- List of fishes in Bangladesh
- List of fishes of Great Britain
- List of freshwater fishes of Greece
- List of freshwater fishes of Korea
- River ecosystems
- Saltwater fish – Fish that live all or much of their lives in seawater
