= List of freshwater fishes of Washington =

The following list of known freshwater fish species, subspecies, and hybrids occurring in Washington state is taken from Wydoski and Whitney(2003). Some scientific names have been updated or corrected. Trout nomenclature follows Behnke et al.(2002). Asterisks denote introduced fishes. The list includes several anadromous species, and two normally marine species (starry flounder and shiner perch) that are occasionally found in freshwater. Only one species (Olympic mudminnow) is a Washington endemic, however three others (Nooksack dace, Salish sucker, and margined sculpin) have very limited distributions outside the state. Sixty-seven fish species, subspecies, or hybrids are listed, 37 native, and 30 introduced.

== Petromyzontiformes ==
=== Family Petromyzontidae ===
- Pacific lamprey, Entosphenus tridentatus
- Western river lamprey, Lampetra ayresi
- Western brook lamprey, Lampetra richardsoni

== Acipenseriformes ==
=== Family Acipenseridae ===
- Green sturgeon, Acipenser medirostris
- White sturgeon, Acipenser transmontanus

== Clupeiformes ==
=== Family Clupeidae ===
- American shad*, Dorosoma sapidissima

== Cypriniformes ==
=== Family Catostomidae ===
- Longnose sucker, Catostomus catostomus
- Bridgelip sucker, Catostomus columbianus
- Largescale sucker, Catostomus macrocheilus
- Mountain sucker, Catostomus platyrhynchus
- Salish sucker, Catostomus sp.

=== Family Cobitidae ===
- Weatherfish*, Misgurnus anguillicaudatus

=== Family Cyprinidae ===
- Chiselmouth, Acrocheilus alutaceus
- Goldfish*, Carassius auratus
- Lake chub, Couseius plumbeus
- Grass carp*, Ctenopharyngodon idella
- Common carp*, Cyprinus carpio
- Tui chub, Gila bicolor
- Peamouth, Mylocheilus caurinus
- Golden shiner*, Notemigonus crysoleucas
- Fathead minnow*, Pimephales promelas
- Northern pikeminnow, Ptychocheilus oregonensis
- Longnose dace, Rhinichthys cataractae
  - Nooksack dace, Rhinichthys cataractae ssp.
- Leopard dace, Rhinichthys falcatus
- Speckled dace, Rhinichthys osculus
- Umatilla dace, Rhinichthys umatilla
- Redside shiner, Richardsonius balteatus
- Tench*, Tinca tinca

== Cyprinodontiformes ==
=== Family Fundulidae ===
- Banded killifish*, Fundulus diaphanus

=== Family Poeciliidae ===
- Mosquitofish*, Gambusia affinis

== Esociformes ==
=== Family Esocidae ===
- Grass pickerel*,Esox americanus vermiculatus
- Northern pike*, Esox lucius
- Tiger muskellunge*, E. lucius x E. masquinongy hybrid
- Olympic mudminnow, Novumbra hubbsi

== Perciformes ==
=== Family Centrarchidae ===
- Rock bass*, Ambloplites rupestris
- Green sunfish*, Lepomis cyanellus
- Pumpkinseed*, Lepomis gibbosus
- Warmouth*, Lepomis gulosus
- Bluegill*, Lepomis macrochirus
- Smallmouth bass*, Micropterus dolomieui
- Largemouth bass*, Micropterus salmoides
- White crappie*, Pomoxis annularis
- Black crappie*, Pomoxis nigromaculatus

=== Family Embiotocidae ===
- Shiner perch, Cymatogaster aggregata

=== Family Percidae ===
- Yellow perch*, Perca flavescens
- Walleye*, Sander vitreus

=== Family Moronidae ===
- Striped bass*, Morone saxatilis

== Percopsiformes ==
=== Family Percopsidae ===
- Sand roller, Percopsis transmontanus

== Gadiformes ==
=== Family Gadidae ===
- Burbot, Lota lota

== Gasterosteiformes ==
=== Family Gasterosteidae ===
- Brook stickleback*, Culaea inconstans
- Three-spine stickleback, Gasterosteus aculeatus

== Osmeriformes ==
=== Family Osmeridae ===
- Longfin smelt, Spirinchus thaleichthys
- Eulachon, Thaleichthys pacificus

== Pleuronectiformes ==
=== Family Pleuronectidae ===
- Starry flounder, Platichthys stellatus

== Salmoniformes ==
=== Family Salmonidae ===
- Oncorhynchus clarkii:
  - Coastal cutthroat trout, Oncorhynchus clarki clarki
  - Lahontan cutthroat trout*, Oncorhynchus clarki henshawi
  - Westslope cutthroat trout, Oncorhynchus clarki lewisi
- Lake whitefish*, Coregonus clupeaformis
- Pink salmon, Oncorhynchus gorbuscha
- Chum salmon, Oncorhynchus keta
- Coho salmon, Oncorhynchus kisutch
- Oncorhynchus mykiss:
  - Golden trout*, Oncorhynchus mykiss aguabonita
  - Columbia River redband trout, Oncorhynchus mykiss gairdneri
  - Coastal rainbow trout/Steelhead, Oncorhynchus mykiss irideus
- Sockeye salmon/Kokanee, Oncorhynchus nerka
- Chinook salmon, Oncorhynchus tshawytscha
- Pygmy whitefish, Prosopium coulteri
- Mountain whitefish, Prosopium williamsoni
- Atlantic salmon*, Salmo salar
- Brown trout*, Salmo trutta
- Bull trout, Salvelinus confluentus
- Brook trout*, Salvelinus fontinalis
- Dolly Varden trout, Salvelinus malma
- Lake trout*, Salvelinus namaycush
- Arctic grayling*, Thymallus arcticus

== Scorpaeniformes ==
=== Family Cottidae ===
- Coastrange sculpin, Cottus aleuticus
- Prickly sculpin, Cottus asper
- Mottled sculpin, Cottus bairdi
- Paiute sculpin, Cottus beldingi
- Slimy sculpin, Cottus cognatus
- Shorthead sculpin, Cottus confusus
- Riffle sculpin, Cottus gulosus
- Reticulate sculpin, Cottus perplexus
- Margined sculpin, Cottus marginatus
- Torrent sculpin, Cottus rhotheus
- Pacific staghorn sculpin, Leptocottus armatus

== Siluriformes ==
=== Family Ictaluridae ===
- Black bullhead*, Ameiurus melas
- Yellow bullhead*, Ameiurus natalis
- Brown bullhead*, Ameiurus nebulosus
- Channel catfish*, Ictalurus punctatus
- Tadpole madtom*, Noturus gyrinus
- Flathead catfish*, Pylodictis olivaris
