= Geography of Washington (state) =

Major cities in Washington
Geography of Washington (state) (Washington (state))

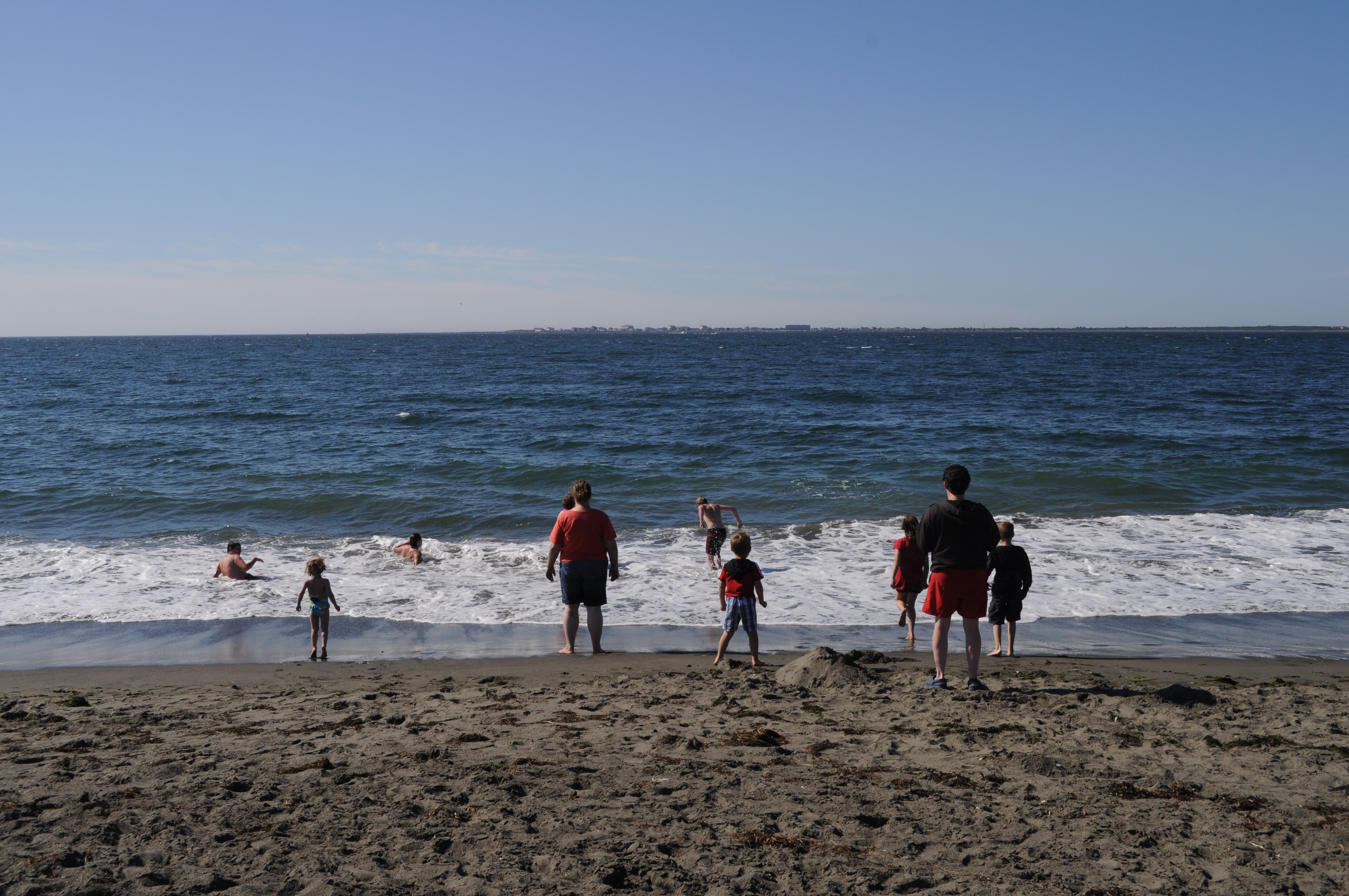
The Pacific coast of Westport

Washington is the northwesternmost state of the contiguous United States. It borders Idaho to the east, bounded mostly by the meridian running north from the confluence of the Snake River and Clearwater River (about 117°02'23" west), except for the southernmost section where the border follows the Snake River. Oregon is to the south, with the Columbia River forming the western part and the 46th parallel forming the eastern part of the Oregon–Washington border. During Washington's partition from Oregon, the original plan for the border followed the Columbia River east until the confluence with the Snake river, and then would have followed the Snake River east; this was changed to keep Walla Walla's fertile farmland in Washington.

To the west of Washington lies the Pacific Ocean. Its northern border lies mostly along the 49th parallel, and then via marine boundaries through the Strait of Georgia, Haro Strait, and Strait of Juan de Fuca, with the Canadian province of British Columbia to the north.

== Overview ==
Washington is part of a region known as the Pacific Northwest, a term which always refers to at least Washington and Oregon, and may or may not include some or all the following, depending on the user's intent: Idaho, western Montana, northern California, British Columbia, and Alaska.

The high mountains of the Cascade Range run north–south, bisecting the state. In addition to Western Washington and Eastern Washington, residents call the two parts of the state the "Westside" and the "Eastside", "Wet side" and "Dry side", or "Timberland" and "Wheatland", the latter pair more commonly in the names of region-specific businesses and institutions. These terms reflect the geography, climate, and industry of the land on both sides of the Cascades.

=== Western Washington ===
Major volcanoes in Washington
Geography of Washington (state) (Washington (state))

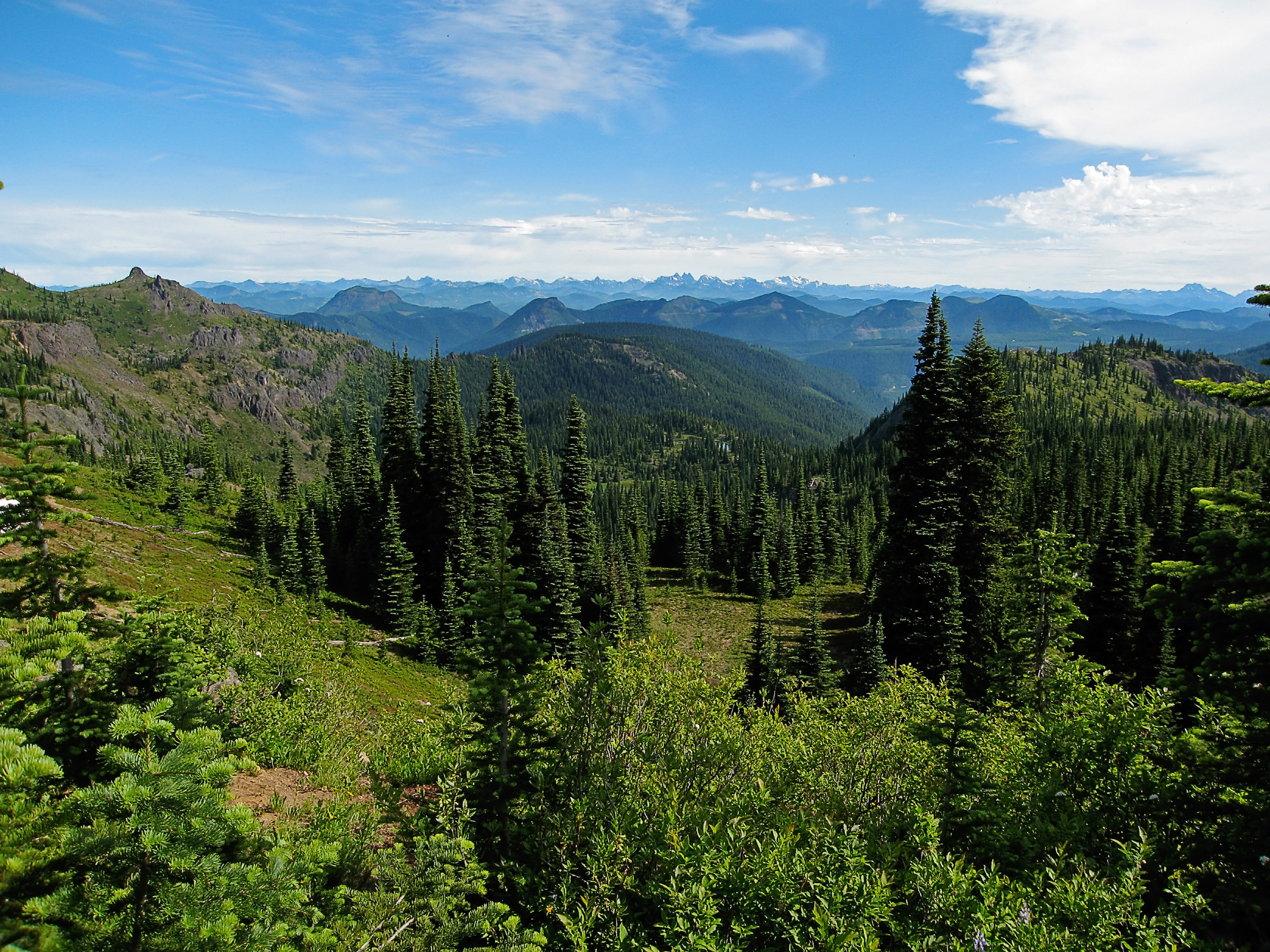
Mount Baker–Snoqualmie National Forest

From the Cascade Mountains westward, Western Washington has a mostly Mediterranean climate, with mild temperatures and wet winters, autumns and springs, and relatively dry summers. The Cascade Range has several volcanoes, which reach altitudes significantly higher than the rest of the mountains. From north to south, these major volcanoes are Mount Baker, Glacier Peak, Mount Rainier, Mount St. Helens, and Mount Adams. All are active volcanoes.

Mount Rainier—the tallest mountain in the state— is 50 miles (80 km) south of the city of Seattle, from which it is prominently visible. The U.S. Geological Survey considers 14,411-foot-tall (4,392 m) Mount Rainier the most dangerous volcano in the Cascade Range, due to its proximity to the Seattle metropolitan area, and most dangerous in the continental U.S. according to the Decade Volcanoes list. It is also covered with more glacial ice than any other peak in the contiguous 48 states.

Western Washington also is home of the Olympic Mountains, far west on the Olympic Peninsula, which support dense forests of conifers and areas of temperate rainforest. These deep forests, such as the Hoh Rainforest, are among the only rainforests in the continental United States. While Western Washington does not always experience a high amount of rainfall as measured in total inches of rain per year, it does consistently have more rainy days per year than most other places in the country.

=== Eastern Washington ===
Southeastern Washington

Eastern Washington—the part of the state east of the Cascades—has a relatively dry climate, in distinct contrast to the west side. It includes large areas of semiarid steppe and a few truly arid deserts in the rain shadow of the Cascades; the Hanford reservation receives an average annual precipitation of 6 to 7 inches (150 to 180 mm). Despite the limited amount of rainfall, agriculture is an extremely important business throughout much of Eastern Washington, as the soil is highly productive and irrigation, aided by dams along the Columbia River, is fairly widespread. The spread of population in Eastern Washington is dominated by access to water, especially rivers. The main cities are all located alongside rivers or lakes; most of them are named after the river or lake they adjoin.

Farther east, the climate becomes less arid, with annual rainfall increasing as one goes east to 21.2 inches (540 mm) in Pullman, near the Washington–Idaho border. The Okanogan Highlands and the rugged Kettle River Range and Selkirk Mountains cover much of the state's northeastern quadrant. The Palouse southeast region of Washington was grassland that has been mostly converted into farmland, and extends to the Blue Mountains.

== Climate ==
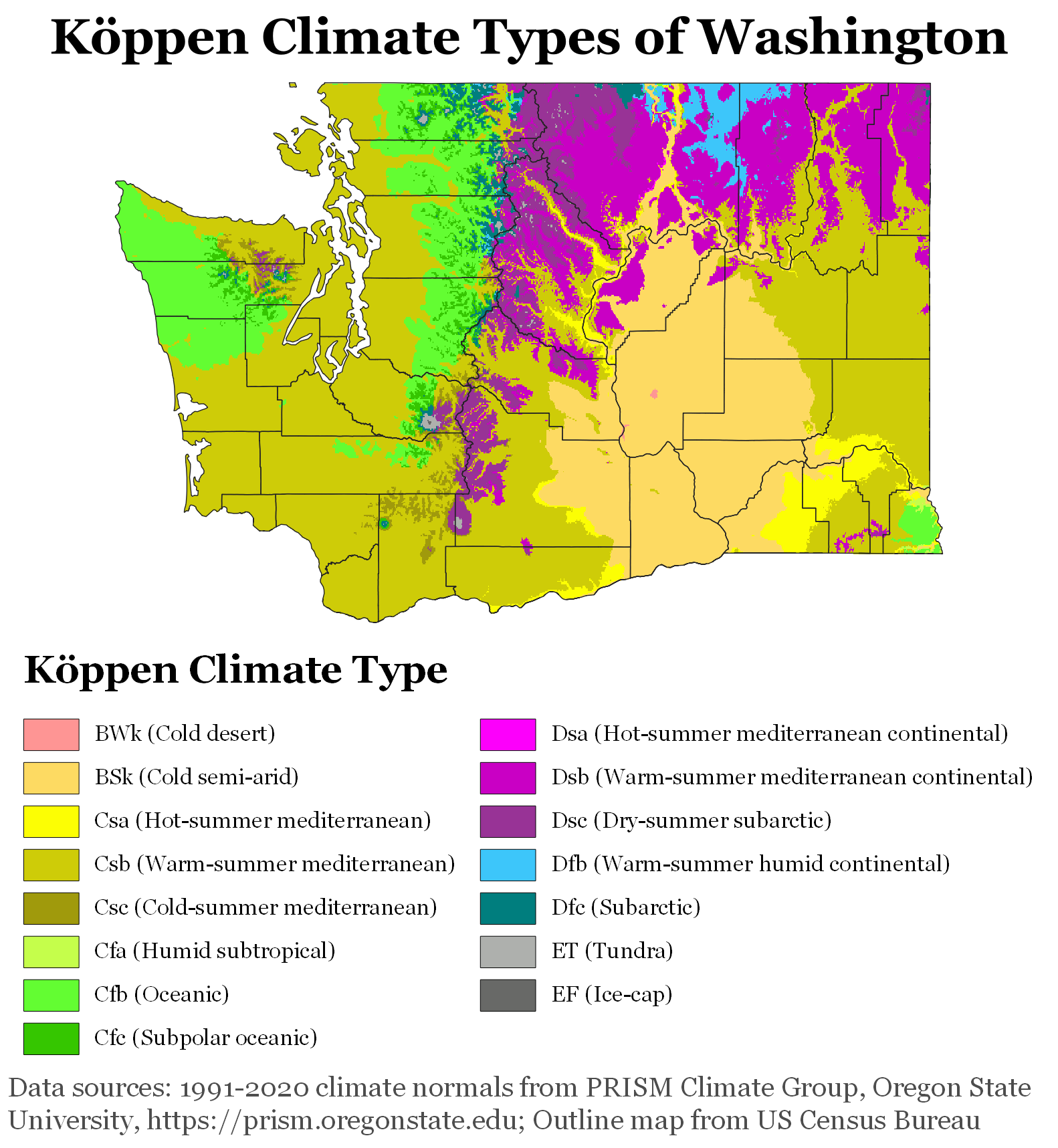
Köppen climate types of Washington, using 1991-2020 climate normals.

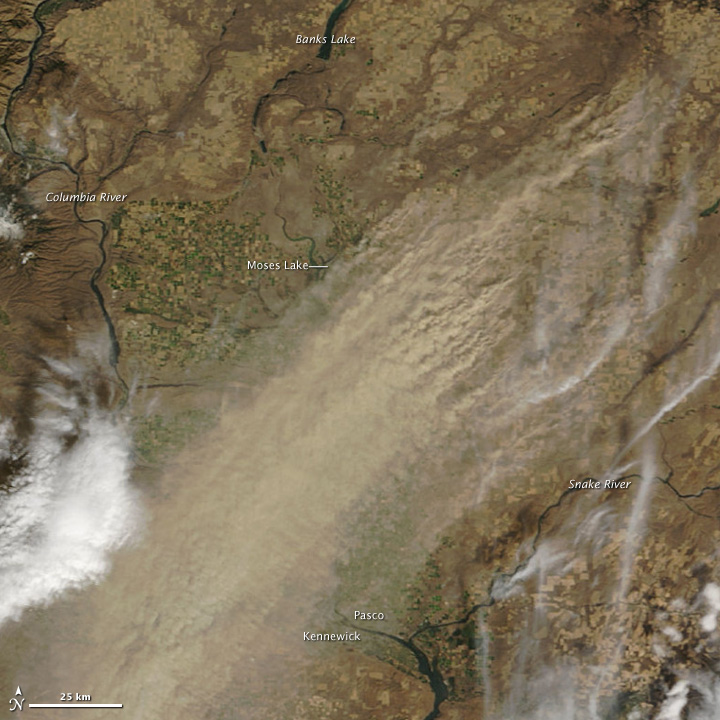
Dryland farming caused a large dust storm in arid parts of Eastern Washington on October 4, 2009. Courtesy: NASA/GSFC, MODIS Rapid Response.

Major factors determining Washington's climate include the large semi-permanent high pressure and low pressure systems of the north Pacific Ocean, the continental air masses of North America, and the Olympic and Cascade mountains. In the spring and summer, a high-pressure anticyclone system dominates the north Pacific Ocean, causing air to spiral out in a clockwise fashion. For Washington, this means prevailing winds from the northwest bring relatively cool air and a predictably dry season.

In the autumn and winter, a low-pressure cyclone system takes over in the north Pacific Ocean. The air spiraling inward in a counter-clockwise fashion causes Washington's prevailing winds to come from the southwest, and bring relatively warm and moist air masses and a predictably wet season. The term "Pineapple Express" is used colloquially to describe atmospheric river events, where repeated storm systems are directed by this persistent cyclone from tropical and near-tropical Pacific regions into the Pacific Northwest.

Despite Western Washington's marine climate similar to many coastal cities of Europe, there are exceptions such as the "Big Snow" events of 1880, 1881, 1893, and 1916, and the "deep freeze" winters of 1883–1884, 1915–1916, 1949–1950, and 1955–1956, among others. During these events, Western Washington experienced up to 6 feet (1.8 m) of snow, sub-zero (−18 °C) temperatures, three months with snow on the ground, and lakes and rivers frozen over for weeks. Seattle's lowest officially recorded temperature is 0 °F (−18 °C) set on January 31, 1950, but low-altitude areas approximately three hours away from Seattle have recorded lows as cold as −48 °F (−44 °C).

The Southern Oscillation greatly influences weather during the cold season. During the El Niño phase, the jet stream enters the U.S. farther south through California, therefore late fall and winter are drier than normal with less snowpack. The La Niña phase reinforces the jet stream through the Pacific Northwest, causing Washington to have more rain and snow than average.

In 2006, the Climate Impacts Group at the University of Washington published The Impacts of Climate change in Washington's Economy, a preliminary assessment of the risks and opportunities presented given the possibility of a rise in global temperatures and their effects on Washington state.

=== Rain shadow effects ===
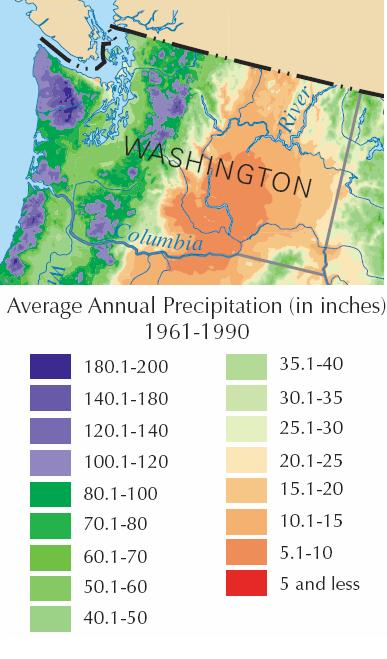
Washington experiences extensive variation in rainfall.

Rainfall in Washington varies dramatically going from east to west. The Olympic Peninsula's western side receives as much as 160 inches (4,100 mm) of precipitation annually, making it the wettest area of the 48 conterminous states and a temperate rainforest. Weeks may pass without a clear day. The western slopes of the Cascade Range receive some of the heaviest annual snowfall (in some places more than 200 inches or 5,100 millimeters water equivalent) in the country. In the rain shadow area east of the Cascades, the annual precipitation is only 6 inches (150 mm). Precipitation then increases again eastward toward the Rocky Mountains (about 120 miles (190 km) east of the Idaho border).

The Olympic mountains and Cascades compound this climatic pattern by causing orographic lift of the air masses blown inland from the Pacific Ocean, resulting in the windward side of the mountains receiving high levels of precipitation and the leeward side receiving low levels. This occurs most dramatically around the Olympic Mountains and the Cascade Range. In both cases, the windward slopes facing southwest receive high precipitation and mild, cool temperatures. While the Puget Sound lowlands are known for clouds and rain in the winter, the western slopes of the Cascades receive larger amounts of precipitation, often falling as snow at higher elevations. Mount Baker, near the state's northern border, is one of the snowiest places in the world. In 1999, it set the world record for snowfall in a single season—1,140 inches (95 ft; 29 m).

East of the Cascades, a large region experiences strong rain shadow effects. Semi-arid conditions occur in much of Eastern Washington with the strongest rain shadow effects at the relatively low elevations of the central Columbia Plateau—especially the region just east of the Columbia River from about the Snake River to the Okanagan Highland. Thus, instead of rain forests, much of Eastern Washington is covered with dry grassland, shrub-steppe, and dunes.

=== Temperatures ===
The average annual temperature ranges from 51 °F (11 °C) on the Pacific coast to 40 °F (4 °C) in the northeast. The lowest temperature recorded in the state was −48 °F (−44 °C) in Winthrop and Mazama. The highest recorded temperature in the state was 120 °F (49 °C) at Hanford on June 29, 2021. Both records were set east of the Cascades. Western Washington is known for its mild climate, considerable fog, frequent cloud cover, long-lasting drizzles in the winter and warm, temperate summers. The eastern region, which does not benefit from the general moderating effect of the Pacific Ocean, occasionally experiences extreme climate. Arctic cold fronts in the winter and heat waves in the summer are not uncommon. In the Western region, temperatures have reached as high as 118 °F (48 °C) in Maple Valley during the June 2021 heat wave, which was reported to be a 1000-year weather event and broke several records in the Pacific Northwest. In Western Washington, they have also gone as low as −6 °F (−21 °C) in Longview.

=== Climate data ===
Climate data for Washington state (general) (1895–2015)
Month	Jan	Feb	Mar	Apr	May	Jun	Jul	Aug	Sep	Oct	Nov	Dec	Year
Record high °F (°C)	74 (23)	83 (28)	95 (35)	103 (39)	107 (42)	120 (49)	118 (48)	118 (48)	111 (44)	99 (37)	83 (28)	74 (23)	120 (49)
Mean maximum °F (°C)	60 (16)	64 (18)	73 (23)	86 (30)	94 (34)	102 (39)	109 (43)	106 (41)	98 (37)	84 (29)	67 (19)	60 (16)	112 (44)
Mean daily maximum °F (°C)	34.8 (1.6)	40.6 (4.8)	47.7 (8.7)	55.9 (13.3)	63.6 (17.6)	69.9 (21.1)	78.0 (25.6)	77.3 (25.2)	69.4 (20.8)	57.2 (14.0)	43.2 (6.2)	36.2 (2.3)	56.2 (13.4)
Mean daily minimum °F (°C)	23.0 (−5.0)	26.0 (−3.3)	29.6 (−1.3)	34.2 (1.2)	40.1 (4.5)	45.7 (7.6)	50.5 (10.3)	50.0 (10.0)	44.7 (7.1)	37.2 (2.9)	29.9 (−1.2)	25.3 (−3.7)	36.4 (2.4)
Mean minimum °F (°C)	−19 (−28)	−8 (−22)	−2 (−19)	14 (−10)	21 (−6)	26 (−3)	31 (−1)	31 (−1)	24 (−4)	16 (−9)	2 (−17)	−8 (−22)	−20 (−29)
Record low °F (°C)	−42 (−41)	−40 (−40)	−25 (−32)	−7 (−22)	11 (−12)	20 (−7)	22 (−6)	20 (−7)	11 (−12)	−5 (−21)	−29 (−34)	−48 (−44)	−48 (−44)
Average precipitation inches (mm)	6.08 (154)	4.61 (117)	4.23 (107)	2.87 (73)	2.31 (59)	1.89 (48)	0.85 (22)	1.02 (26)	1.93 (49)	3.67 (93)	6.22 (158)	6.52 (166)	42.2 (1,072)
Source 1: "Office of the Washington State Climatologist". OWSC. Archived from the original on October 20, 2019.
Source 2: "Comparative Data for the Western States". WRCC. Archived from the original on July 29, 2016.

Average daily high and low temperatures in °F (°C) in cities and other locations in Washington colored and sortable by average temperature
Place	Jan	Feb	Mar	Apr	May	Jun	Jul	Aug	Sep	Oct	Nov	Dec
Bellingham	48 / 36 (9 / 2)	50 / 36 (10 / 2)	54 / 39 (12 / 4)	59 / 42 (15 / 6)	64 / 47 (18 / 8)	69 / 51 (21 / 11)	73 / 54 (23 / 12)	74 / 54 (23 / 12)	68 / 50 (20 / 10)	59 / 45 (15 / 7)	51 / 39 (11 / 4)	46 / 35 (8 / 2)
Ephrata	35 / 22 (2 / −6)	43 / 26 (6 / −3)	54 / 32 (12 / 0)	63 / 38 (17 / 3)	72 / 46 (22 / 8)	80 / 54 (27 / 12)	88 / 60 (31 / 16)	87 / 59 (31 / 15)	78 / 50 (26 / 10)	62 / 39 (17 / 4)	45 / 29 (7 / −2)	34 / 21 (1 / −6)
Forks	47 / 36 (8 / 2)	49 / 35 (9 / 2)	51 / 37 (11 / 3)	55 / 39 (13 / 4)	60 / 43 (16 / 6)	63 / 48 (17 / 9)	67 / 51 (19 / 11)	69 / 51 (21 / 11)	66 / 47 (19 / 8)	58 / 42 (14 / 6)	50 / 38 (10 / 3)	46 / 35 (8 / 2)
Paradise	35 / 23 (2 / −5)	36 / 22 (2 / −6)	38 / 24 (3 / −4)	42 / 26 (6 / −3)	49 / 32 (9 / 0)	55 / 36 (13 / 2)	63 / 43 (17 / 6)	65 / 44 (18 / 7)	58 / 40 (14 / 4)	48 / 33 (9 / 1)	37 / 25 (3 / −4)	34 / 21 (1 / −6)
Richland	41 / 29 (5 / −2)	47 / 30 (8 / −1)	58 / 35 (14 / 2)	65 / 41 (18 / 5)	73 / 48 (23 / 9)	80 / 54 (27 / 12)	88 / 59 (31 / 15)	88 / 58 (31 / 14)	78 / 50 (26 / 10)	64 / 40 (18 / 4)	49 / 34 (9 / 1)	38 / 27 (3 / −3)
Seattle	47 / 37 (8 / 3)	50 / 37 (10 / 3)	54 / 39 (12 / 4)	59 / 42 (15 / 6)	65 / 47 (18 / 8)	70 / 52 (21 / 11)	76 / 56 (24 / 13)	76 / 56 (24 / 13)	71 / 52 (22 / 11)	60 / 46 (16 / 8)	51 / 40 (11 / 4)	46 / 36 (8 / 2)
Spokane	35 / 24 (2 / −4)	40 / 25 (4 / −4)	49 / 31 (9 / −1)	57 / 36 (14 / 2)	67 / 43 (19 / 6)	74 / 50 (23 / 10)	83 / 55 (28 / 13)	83 / 55 (28 / 13)	73 / 46 (23 / 8)	58 / 36 (14 / 2)	42 / 29 (6 / −2)	32 / 22 (0 / −6)
Vancouver	47 / 33 (8 / 1)	51 / 33 (11 / 1)	56 / 37 (13 / 3)	60 / 40 (16 / 4)	67 / 45 (19 / 7)	72 / 50 (22 / 10)	78 / 54 (26 / 12)	79 / 53 (26 / 12)	75 / 48 (24 / 9)	63 / 41 (17 / 5)	52 / 37 (11 / 3)	46 / 32 (8 / 0)
Winthrop	31 / 15 (−1 / −9)	39 / 18 (4 / −8)	51 / 26 (11 / −3)	62 / 32 (17 / 0)	71 / 40 (22 / 4)	78 / 46 (26 / 8)	86 / 50 (30 / 10)	86 / 49 (30 / 9)	78 / 41 (26 / 5)	62 / 32 (17 / 0)	42 / 25 (6 / −4)	29 / 14 (−2 / −10)
Yakima	39 / 23 (4 / −5)	46 / 26 (8 / −3)	56 / 30 (13 / −1)	64 / 34 (18 / 1)	72 / 42 (22 / 6)	80 / 48 (27 / 9)	88 / 53 (31 / 12)	87 / 52 (31 / 11)	78 / 44 (26 / 7)	64 / 34 (18 / 1)	48 / 27 (9 / −3)	36 / 21 (2 / −6)

Climate data for Seattle (SeaTac Airport), 1991–2020 normals, (Note: Mean monthly maxima and minima (i.e. the highest and lowest temperature readings during an entire month or year) calculated based on data at said location from 1991 to 2020.) extremes 1894–present (Note: Official records are restricted to SeaTac Airport from January 1945 onward.)
Month	Jan	Feb	Mar	Apr	May	Jun	Jul	Aug	Sep	Oct	Nov	Dec	Year
Record high °F (°C)	67 (19)	70 (21)	79 (26)	89 (32)	93 (34)	108 (42)	103 (39)	99 (37)	98 (37)	89 (32)	74 (23)	66 (19)	108 (42)
Mean maximum °F (°C)	57.0 (13.9)	59.1 (15.1)	66.4 (19.1)	74.3 (23.5)	81.9 (27.7)	85.8 (29.9)	91.2 (32.9)	89.9 (32.2)	84.1 (28.9)	72.0 (22.2)	61.6 (16.4)	56.8 (13.8)	94.1 (34.5)
Mean daily maximum °F (°C)	48.0 (8.9)	50.3 (10.2)	54.2 (12.3)	59.3 (15.2)	66.3 (19.1)	71.1 (21.7)	77.4 (25.2)	77.6 (25.3)	71.6 (22.0)	60.5 (15.8)	52.1 (11.2)	47.0 (8.3)	61.3 (16.3)
Daily mean °F (°C)	42.8 (6.0)	44.0 (6.7)	47.1 (8.4)	51.3 (10.7)	57.5 (14.2)	62.0 (16.7)	67.1 (19.5)	67.4 (19.7)	62.6 (17.0)	53.8 (12.1)	46.5 (8.1)	42.0 (5.6)	53.7 (12.1)
Mean daily minimum °F (°C)	37.7 (3.2)	37.7 (3.2)	39.9 (4.4)	43.3 (6.3)	48.7 (9.3)	53.0 (11.7)	56.8 (13.8)	57.2 (14.0)	53.6 (12.0)	47.0 (8.3)	40.9 (4.9)	37.1 (2.8)	46.1 (7.8)
Mean minimum °F (°C)	26.1 (−3.3)	27.3 (−2.6)	31.3 (−0.4)	35.6 (2.0)	40.6 (4.8)	46.6 (8.1)	51.5 (10.8)	51.7 (10.9)	45.8 (7.7)	36.8 (2.7)	29.2 (−1.6)	25.4 (−3.7)	21.5 (−5.8)
Record low °F (°C)	0 (−18)	1 (−17)	11 (−12)	29 (−2)	28 (−2)	38 (3)	43 (6)	44 (7)	35 (2)	28 (−2)	6 (−14)	6 (−14)	0 (−18)
Average precipitation inches (mm)	5.78 (147)	3.76 (96)	4.17 (106)	3.18 (81)	1.88 (48)	1.45 (37)	0.60 (15)	0.97 (25)	1.61 (41)	3.91 (99)	6.31 (160)	5.72 (145)	39.34 (999)
Average snowfall inches (cm)	1.8 (4.6)	2.2 (5.6)	0.4 (1.0)	0.0 (0.0)	0.0 (0.0)	0.0 (0.0)	0.0 (0.0)	0.0 (0.0)	0.0 (0.0)	0.0 (0.0)	0.2 (0.51)	1.7 (4.3)	6.3 (16)
Average precipitation days (≥ 0.01 in)	18.7	15.9	17.1	15.0	11.3	9.2	4.7	4.9	8.3	14.3	18.4	18.4	156.2
Average snowy days (≥ 0.1 in)	1.4	1.2	0.4	0.0	0.0	0.0	0.0	0.0	0.0	0.0	0.2	1.5	4.7
Average relative humidity (%)	78.0	75.2	73.6	71.4	68.9	67.1	65.4	68.2	73.2	78.6	79.8	80.1	73.3
Average dew point °F (°C)	33.1 (0.6)	35.1 (1.7)	36.3 (2.4)	38.8 (3.8)	43.5 (6.4)	48.2 (9.0)	51.4 (10.8)	52.7 (11.5)	50.2 (10.1)	45.1 (7.3)	38.8 (3.8)	34.3 (1.3)	42.3 (5.7)
Mean monthly sunshine hours	69.8	108.8	178.4	207.3	253.7	268.4	312.0	281.4	221.7	142.6	72.7	52.9	2,169.7
Percentage possible sunshine	25	38	48	51	54	56	65	64	59	42	26	20	49
Average ultraviolet index	0.8	1.5	2.8	4.5	6.0	6.9	7.3	6.2	4.4	2.3	1.1	0.7	3.7
Source 1: NOAA (relative humidity, dew point and sun 1961–1990)
Source 2: UV Index Today (1995 to 2022)

Climate data for Spokane
Month	Jan	Feb	Mar	Apr	May	Jun	Jul	Aug	Sep	Oct	Nov	Dec	Year
Record high °F (°C)	62 (17)	63 (17)	74 (23)	90 (32)	97 (36)	109 (43)	108 (42)	108 (42)	98 (37)	87 (31)	70 (21)	60 (16)	109 (43)
Mean maximum °F (°C)	48.2 (9.0)	51.1 (10.6)	63.0 (17.2)	73.9 (23.3)	84.0 (28.9)	90.5 (32.5)	97.5 (36.4)	97.0 (36.1)	89.2 (31.8)	74.6 (23.7)	56.4 (13.6)	48.0 (8.9)	99.1 (37.3)
Mean daily maximum °F (°C)	34.5 (1.4)	39.5 (4.2)	48.6 (9.2)	56.9 (13.8)	67.1 (19.5)	73.7 (23.2)	84.4 (29.1)	83.8 (28.8)	73.6 (23.1)	57.7 (14.3)	42.3 (5.7)	33.8 (1.0)	58.0 (14.4)
Daily mean °F (°C)	29.6 (−1.3)	32.9 (0.5)	40.0 (4.4)	47.0 (8.3)	56.0 (13.3)	62.3 (16.8)	71.0 (21.7)	70.3 (21.3)	61.1 (16.2)	47.9 (8.8)	36.3 (2.4)	29.1 (−1.6)	48.6 (9.2)
Mean daily minimum °F (°C)	24.7 (−4.1)	26.3 (−3.2)	31.5 (−0.3)	37.0 (2.8)	44.9 (7.2)	50.8 (10.4)	57.6 (14.2)	56.7 (13.7)	48.6 (9.2)	38.0 (3.3)	30.3 (−0.9)	24.3 (−4.3)	39.2 (4.0)
Mean minimum °F (°C)	4.4 (−15.3)	9.8 (−12.3)	18.5 (−7.5)	26.4 (−3.1)	32.7 (0.4)	40.2 (4.6)	45.9 (7.7)	45.6 (7.6)	35.4 (1.9)	23.2 (−4.9)	14.1 (−9.9)	7.1 (−13.8)	−3.0 (−19.4)
Record low °F (°C)	−30 (−34)	−24 (−31)	−10 (−23)	14 (−10)	24 (−4)	33 (1)	37 (3)	35 (2)	22 (−6)	7 (−14)	−21 (−29)	−25 (−32)	−30 (−34)
Average precipitation inches (mm)	1.97 (50)	1.44 (37)	1.83 (46)	1.25 (32)	1.55 (39)	1.17 (30)	0.42 (11)	0.47 (12)	0.58 (15)	1.37 (35)	2.06 (52)	2.34 (59)	16.45 (418)
Average snowfall inches (cm)	12.3 (31)	7.8 (20)	3.9 (9.9)	0.7 (1.8)	0.1 (0.25)	0.0 (0.0)	0.0 (0.0)	0.0 (0.0)	0.1 (0.25)	0.5 (1.3)	6.2 (16)	13.8 (35)	45.4 (115)
Average precipitation days (≥ 0.01 in)	14.2	10.9	11.8	10.3	9.7	7.8	4.0	3.2	4.7	8.9	13.4	13.8	112.7
Average snowy days (≥ 0.1 in)	9.5	5.7	4.0	1.0	0.3	0.0	0.0	0.0	0.1	0.3	4.3	9.5	34.7
Average relative humidity (%)	82.5	79.1	70.3	61.0	58.2	53.9	44.0	45.0	53.9	66.6	82.7	85.5	65.2
Mean monthly sunshine hours	78.3	118.0	199.3	242.3	296.7	322.8	382.4	340.4	271.2	191.0	73.8	59.1	2,575.3
Percentage possible sunshine	28	41	54	59	63	68	79	77	72	57	26	22	54
Source: NOAA (relative humidity and sun 1961–1990)

== Flora and fauna ==
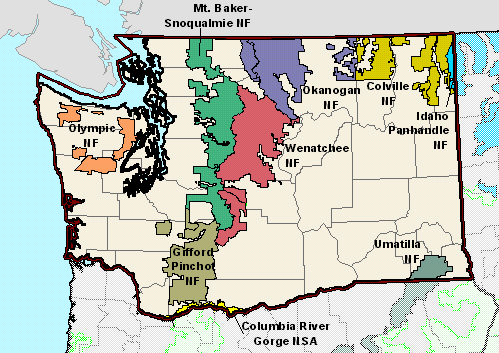
Washington's national forests

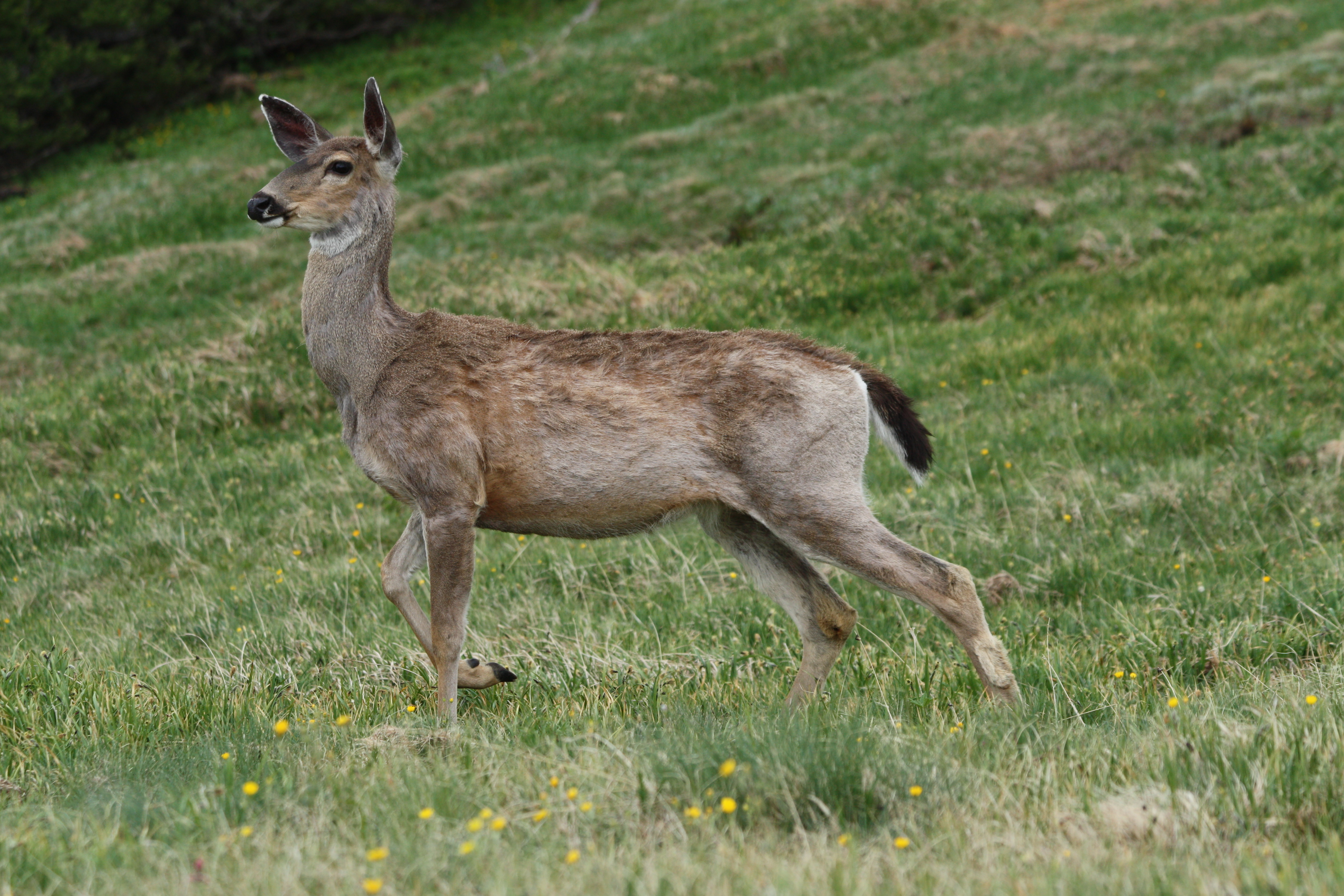
Black-tailed deer graze at Deer Park in Olympic National Park

Forests cover about half the state's land area, mostly west of the northern Cascades. Approximately two-thirds of Washington's 22 million acres of forestlands is publicly owned, including 64 percent of federal land. Common trees and plants in the region are camassia, Douglas fir, hemlock, penstemon, ponderosa pine, western red cedar, and many species of ferns. The state's various areas of wilderness offer sanctuary, with substantially large populations of shorebirds and marine mammals. The Pacific shore surrounding the San Juan Islands is heavily inhabited by killer, gray, and humpback whales.

In Eastern Washington, the flora is vastly different. Tumbleweeds and sagebrush dominate the landscape throughout large parts of the countryside. Russian olives and other trees are common alongside riverbanks; however, apart from the riversides, large swaths of Eastern Washington have no naturally existing trees at all (though many trees have been planted and are irrigated by people, of course). A wider variety of flora can be found in both the Blue Mountains and the eastern sides of the Cascades.

Mammals native to the state include the bat, black bear, bobcat, cougar, coyote, deer, elk, gray wolf, hare, moose, mountain beaver, muskrat, opossum, pocket gopher, rabbit, raccoon, river otter, skunk, and tree squirrel. Because of the wide range of geography, the State of Washington is home to several different ecoregions, which allow for a varied range of bird species. This range includes raptors, shorebirds, woodland birds, grassland birds, ducks, and others. There have also been a large number of species introduced to Washington, dating back to the early 18th century, including horses and burros. The channel catfish, lamprey, and sturgeon are among the 400 known freshwater fishes. Along with the Cascades frog, there are several forms of snakes that define the most prominent reptiles and amphibians. Coastal bays and islands are often inhabited by plentiful amounts of shellfish and whales. There are five species of salmon that ascend the Western Washington area, from streams to spawn.

Washington has a variety of National Park Service units. Among these are the Alta Lake State Park, Lake Roosevelt National Recreation Area, San Juan Islands National Wildlife Refuge, as well as three national parks—the Olympic National Park, North Cascades National Park, and Mount Rainier National Park. The three national parks were established between 1899 and 1968. Almost 95 percent (876,517 acres, 354,714 hectares, 3,547.14 square kilometers) of Olympic National Park's area has been designated as wilderness under the National Wilderness Preservation System. Additionally, there are 143 state parks and 9 national forests, run by the Washington State Park System and the United States Forest Service. The Okanogan National Forest is the largest national forest on the West Coast, encompassing 1,499,023 acres (606,633 ha). It is managed together as the Okanogan–Wenatchee National Forest, encompassing a considerably larger area of around 3,239,404 acres (1,310,940 ha).

== Administrative divisions ==
There are 39 counties within the state, and 281 incorporated municipalities which are divided into cities and towns. The majority of the state's population lives within Western Washington, in the Seattle metropolitan area; the city of Seattle is the principal city of the metropolitan area, and Western Washington, with a 2020 census population of 737,015.

Largest cities or towns in Washington Source: 2020 U.S. census
Rank	Name	County	Pop.
1	Seattle	King	737,015
2	Spokane	Spokane	228,989
3	Tacoma	Pierce	219,346
4	Vancouver	Clark	190,915
5	Bellevue	King	151,854
6	Kent	King	136,588
7	Everett	Snohomish	110,629
8	Renton	King	106,785
9	Spokane Valley	Spokane	102,976
10	Federal Way	King	101,030

== See also ==
- Geography of Idaho
- Mount St Helens
- Cascadia (region)
