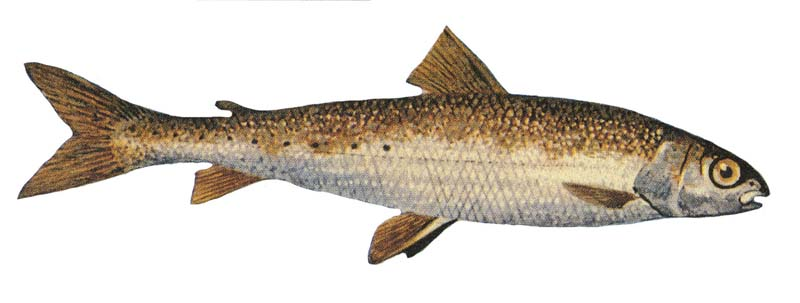
- Prosopium cylindraceum

Scientific classification
- Kingdom: Animalia
- Phylum: Chordata
- Class: Actinopterygii
- Order: Salmoniformes
- Family: Salmonidae
- Subfamily: Coregoninae
- Genus: Prosopium; D. S. Jordan, 1878

Type species
- Coregonus cylindraceus Pennant, 1784

= Prosopium =

Prosopium Temporal range: Late Miocene to Recent

Genus of fishes

Prosopium is a genus of freshwater whitefishes found in North America and parts of eastern Russia. It contains three fairly widespread species: the round whitefish, the pygmy whitefish, and the mountain whitefish. The remaining species, the Bonneville cisco, the Bonneville whitefish, and the Bear Lake whitefish are endemic to Bear Lake.

== Species ==
There are currently six recognized species in this genus:

Image	Scientific name	Common name	Distribution
	Prosopium abyssicola (Snyder, 1919)	Bear Lake whitefish	Bear Lake on the Utah-Idaho border
	Prosopium coulterii (C. H. Eigenmann & R. S. Eigenmann, 1892)	Pygmy whitefish	mountain streams and lakes in western North America, it also has isolated populations in Lake Superior and in Ekityki Lake, Chukchi Peninsula.
	Prosopium cylindraceum (Pennant, 1784)	Round whitefish	Alaska to New England, including the Great Lakes
	Prosopium gemmifer (Snyder, 1919)	Bonneville cisco	Bear Lake on the Utah-Idaho border
	Prosopium spilonotus (Snyder, 1919)	Bonneville whitefish	Bear Lake on the Utah-Idaho border.
	Prosopium williamsoni (Girard, 1856)	Mountain whitefish	Mackenzie River drainage in Northwest Territories, Canada south through western Canada and the northwestern USA in the Pacific, Hudson Bay and upper Missouri River basins to the Truckee River drainage in Nevada and Sevier River drainage in Utah

The extinct species †Prosopium prolixus Kimmel, 1975 is known from Late Miocene and Early Pliocene-aged Deer Butte Formation of Oregon and the Glenns Ferry Formation of Idaho.
