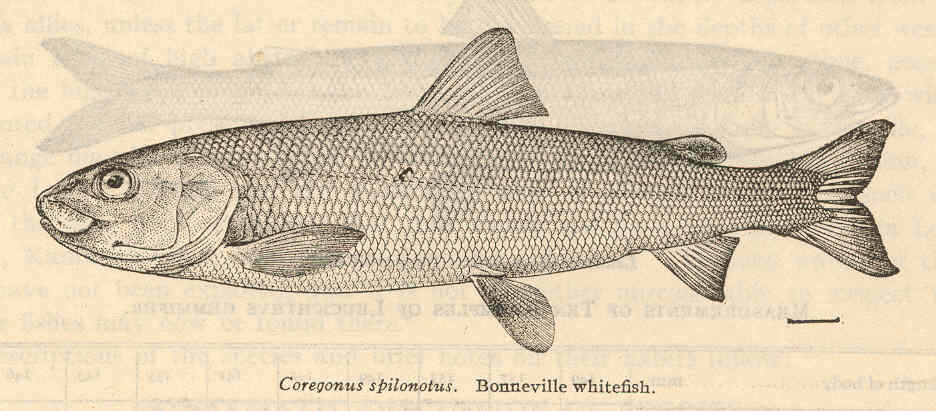

Conservation status
- Vulnerable (NatureServe)

Scientific classification
- Domain: Eukaryota
- Kingdom: Animalia
- Phylum: Chordata
- Class: Actinopterygii
- Order: Salmoniformes
- Family: Salmonidae
- Genus: Prosopium
- Species: P. spilonotus

Binomial name
- Prosopium spilonotus (Snyder, 1919)

= Bonneville whitefish =

Species of fish

The Bonneville whitefish (Prosopium spilonotus) is a salmonid fish endemic to Bear Lake on the Utah-Idaho border. It is one of three species of Prosopium endemic to Bear Lake, the other two being the Bear Lake whitefish and the Bonneville cisco. The species is listed as a Wildlife Species of Concern by the Utah Division of Wildlife Resources.

In appearance, it is very similar to the closely related Bear Lake whitefish P. abyssicola. Generally whitish in color, its nose is more tapered than that of the Bear Lake whitefish, and its scales are smaller. Younger fish, up to 10 inches (25 cm) long, have a pattern of spots which then fades. They have been reported to reach a length of 22 inches (56 cm) and an age of eight years.

It generally inhabits mid-levels of the lake, where it primarily feeds on chironomid larvae and pupae, along with a variety of insects. The fish may also move into shallower waters, particularly during the winter months. Older fish also seem to be more likely to move into shallow water than younger ones.

They spawn from mid-February through early March, over rocky or sandy areas. The female will stop to spawn, with 5-6 males in attendance, the total process lasting 5 to 15 seconds before the fish rejoin their school.

While some are caught on hook and line, they are not especially popular with anglers. A number are caught by gill nets deployed at depths of 40 to 100 feet.
