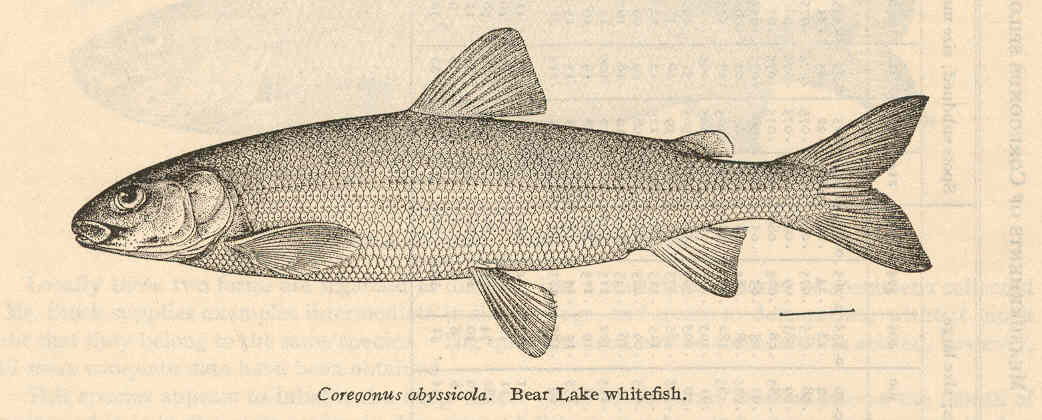

Conservation status
- Critically Imperiled (NatureServe)

Scientific classification
- Kingdom: Animalia
- Phylum: Chordata
- Class: Actinopterygii
- Order: Salmoniformes
- Family: Salmonidae
- Genus: Prosopium
- Species: P. abyssicola

Binomial name
- Prosopium abyssicola (Snyder, 1919)

= Bear Lake whitefish =

Species of fish

The Bear Lake whitefish, Prosopium abyssicola, is a salmonid fish endemic to Bear Lake on the Utah-Idaho border. It is one of three species of Prosopium endemic to Bear Lake, the other two being the Bonneville whitefish and the Bonneville cisco. The species is listed as a Wildlife Species of Concern by the Utah Division of Wildlife Resources.

In appearance it is very similar to the closely related Bonneville whitefish P. spilonotus. Generally whitish in color, it has more of a "Roman nose" than the Bonneville whitefish, and larger scales. It never has spots, while young Bonneville whitefish (up to 10 inches) have a pattern of spots. The Bear Lake whitefish tends to be smaller as well, rarely longer than 9 inches, and with a maximum known length of 11 inches.

It is primarily an inhabitant of the deeper parts of the lake bottom, where it feeds on a variety of small invertebrates such as ostracods, copepods, and insects. It spawns from late December to early February, at depths of 50 to 100 feet.

Rarely seen near the shore, it is not often caught by hook and line.
