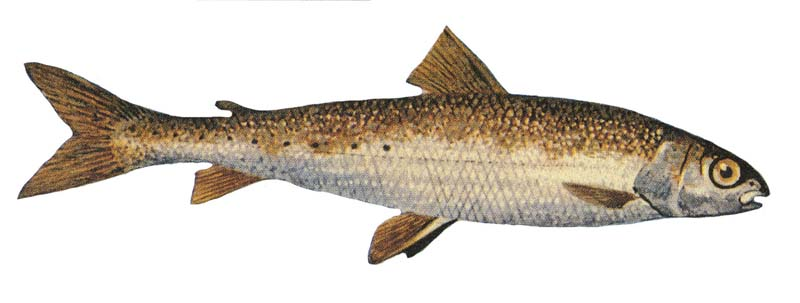

Conservation status
- Least Concern (IUCN 3.1)

Scientific classification
- Kingdom: Animalia
- Phylum: Chordata
- Class: Actinopterygii
- Order: Salmoniformes
- Family: Salmonidae
- Genus: Prosopium
- Species: P. cylindraceum

Binomial name
- Prosopium cylindraceum (Pennant, 1784)

= Round whitefish =

Species of fish

The round whitefish (Prosopium cylindraceum) is a freshwater species of fish that is found in North American drainages from Alaska to New England, including the Great Lakes except for Lake Erie, and in Arctic tributaries of northeast Asia, as well as northern Kamchatka Peninsula and the northern coasts of the Sea of Okhotsk. It has an olive-brown back with light silvery sides and underside and its length is generally between 9 and 19 inches (23 and 48 cm). They are bottom feeders, feeding mostly on invertebrates, such as crustaceans, insect larvae, and fish eggs. Some other fish species, like white sucker in turn eat their eggs. Lake trout, northern pike and burbot are natural predators. Other common names of the round whitefish are Menominee, pilot fish, frost fish, round-fish, and Menominee whitefish. The common name "round whitefish" is also sometimes used to describe Coregonus huntsmani, a salmonid more commonly known as the Atlantic whitefish.

Where it was once common, round whitefish numbers in certain localities have been decreasing in the last century due to a number of possible causes. The round whitefish is now protected in some U.S. states, such as New York and New Hampshire, from harvest or possession as an endangered or threatened species. In Alaska, the whitefish is occasionally caught by anglers, but in general, the fish is not sought after, is rarely caught, since it is a bottom feeder; and the species is not protected. Globally the species has been assessed by the International Union for Conservation of Nature (IUCN) as facing no major threats.

== Description ==
The whitefish is part of the salmon family, and the distinctive traits of this subfamily (in comparison to the rest of the salmon family) include larger scales, smaller mouth, weak or no teeth, and other internal characteristics. The round whitefish is a cylindrical fish (hence cylindraceum) and is considered a deep-bodied fish. It is mostly silver in color with a few exceptions. Its back has a green tinge to its appearance with scales that range from sepia brown to bronze and are edged with black. Its lower fins can be various shades of amber, and its adipose fin is normally brown spotted. The round whitefish has between 42–46 scales around its body, 22–24 scales around its caudal peduncle, and 83–96 scales in its lateral line. In addition, this species has 87–117 pyloric caeca, 59–63 vertebrae, and less than 20 gill rakers. The round whitefish is different than other whitefish by having one flap between the nostril openings (instead of two). It can grow up to 50 centimetres (20 in) in length and typically grow in increments of 55–65 millimetres (2.2–2.6 in) annually. Most of its growth takes place in its first five years of life. Round-fish can live up to 12 years.

== Life cycle ==
Round whitefish have regular migrations to and from freshwater tributaries, where spawning takes place. Spawning sites are layered with various-sized pebbles and are below shoreline currents, roughly 1–1.5 metres (3.5–5 ft) deep. Even at this depth, there is an underwater current, with a velocity of 0.5–1 m/s (1.6–3.3 ft/s), that disperses some of the deposited eggs downstream in the tributary system. Fertilized eggs are 3.1–3.25 mm (0.12–0.13 in) in diameter and are held in spaces between rocks as well as in the ice crystals of the slushy, tributary floor. The sexual dimorphism is subtle in round whitefish in comparison to other species in the salmon family. Males develop defined pearl organs along the side of their bodies and have altered coloration during spawning. Its pelvic, pectoral, and anal fins, as well as its belly, become anywhere from yellow-orange to red in color. Round-fish are fall spawners, laying their eggs between early October and late November, when the water temperature is at or below 2.5 °C (36.5 °F). The spawning migration begins in August, although first maturation fish tend to start migrating as early as June. The round-fish experience their first spawning normally at age seven. These species do not spawn annually, but it is common for first year spawners to spawn the following year. After sexually mature round-fish reach the tributary system, overall growth slows down and annual growth increments decrease from 55–65 mm (2.2–2.6 in) to 40–45 mm (1.6–1.8 in) due to a decrease in food intake.

== Habitat range ==
Round whitefish are found in cold freshwaters of Arctic seas, post-glacial lakes, rivers, and brackish waters. The wide-ranging pilot fish inhabits the northern waters of North America to the northeastern waters of Asia, normally at a depth of 180 to 700 ft (55 to 213 m)+. In Asia, they commonly inhabit from the Siberian Yenisei River to the Kamchatka and the Bering Sea. The North American range of the round-fish includes the Great Lakes (except Lake Erie), areas of the Arctic Ocean, Hudson Bay, waterways in northern Canadian provinces, arctic brackish waters, and throughout Alaska. Although they are freshwater species, the round-fish can be found in areas in the Arctic Ocean that have very low salinity, which occurs from the abundance of rivers and waterways that empty into the Arctic Sea. This explains their wide distribution in northern waters.

== Dietary habits ==
Round whitefish are considered benthivores, feeding on benthos and plankton. In addition to the previous list, the generalized feeding pattern of the round-fish diet includes amphipods, gastropods, isopods, chironomid larvae and pupae, and various aquatic insects, such as spiny water flea (Bythotrephes longimanus). Round whitefish are stable generalized feeders due to the majority of their food being found in the deeper parts of the water. They are considered opportunistic feeders in that round-fish feed on the kind of prey that is available. Among different populations, the main food source each group preys on may differ from one another in relation to what kind of food is available. Other factors that influence food availability are location, neighboring species, and time of year. In different bodies of water at different times of the year, the kind and amount of prey change, and round-fish are adapted to be able to feed on what is seasonally available. This capability allows them to migrate periodically to and from spawning sites. Food availability is also influenced by the abundance of other species sharing and/or around the range of the round-fish. When species return to their non-spawning body of water after spawning and winter, round-fish diet consists of more of chironomids, isopods, and gastropods. During the migration to spawning sites, they mostly feed on spiny water fleas, black fly larvae, and other aquatic insects. These species do not feed during spawning, so it is important for them to increase their food intake to accumulate energy for storage to survive through spawning.

== Human uses and influence ==
Round whitefish is not a primary target of subsistence or sport fisheries. Relatively, low numbers of round-fish are caught, and currently, there are not any fisheries that specifically target these species.

Human activity near round whitefish habitats have some influence on these species. Various studies have taken place near developing projects to learn if and how nearshore developments, such as mining, are influencing fish populations. Currently, the global population is estimated to be either stable or gradually declining globally per the IUCN Red List species assessment. In several studies, a decrease in round-fish food sources has been observed as well as a decrease in water quality. Human influence, on a broader scale, fuels the global warming phenomenon, currently occurring. Although, this change in round-fish populations is minimal in comparison to other aquatic species, this could grow into a larger problem if global warming continues to progress. Round whitefish live and spawn in cold waters, so if water temperatures continue to rise as a result of global climate change, this species may be impacted. If these influences are detrimental enough, broader conservation measures may need to be taken into consideration for the round whitefish.

On a local scale, biotic and abiotic factors can threaten round whitefish and even lead to their extirpation. Predation from native and introduced species such as yellow perch (Perca flavescens), smallmouth bass (Micropterus dolomieu) and rainbow smelt (Osmerus mordax) are detrimental to existing populations and may prevent reintroductions of round whitefish. Competition for food resources in younger life stages with juvenile smelt can also be limiting. Acid rain has been cited as contributing to round whitefish decline in New York. Siltation, which can damage spawning habitat, and chloride pollution from road salt runoff may also impact round whitefish in developed areas.
