= Nooksack dace =

Scientific classification
- Kingdom: Animalia
- Phylum: Chordata
- Class: Actinopterygii
- Order: Cypriniformes
- Family: Cyprinidae
- Genus: Rhinichthys
- Species: R. sp.

Binomial name
- Rhinichthys sp.

The Nooksack dace is a small cyprinid fish occurring in streams in southern British Columbia and western Washington state. It has not yet been formally described taxonomically. It is considered a genetically distinct subspecies of longnose dace (Rhinichthys cataractae) but may be a distinct species.

In Canada, the distribution of the Nooksack dace is limited to four streams: three in the Nooksack basin, and one in the Fraser basin. In Canada, degradation of the stream channels due to urbanization, agriculture and low instream flow has led to the species being declared endangered under Canada's Species at Risk Act. The Nooksack dace requires shallow, fast-flowing riffle habitat within stream channels, and a low flow during the summer has been identified as a key threat to the recovery of this endangered species.

The Nooksack dace is much more widely distributed in Washington, occurring in eastern Puget Sound drainages from the Nooksack south to the Puyallup, and in Pacific coastal drainages from the Quillayute south to the Willapa.
