= Margined sculpin =

Conservation status
- Near Threatened (IUCN 3.1)

Scientific classification
- Kingdom: Animalia
- Phylum: Chordata
- Class: Actinopterygii
- Order: Perciformes
- Suborder: Cottoidei
- Family: Cottidae
- Genus: Cottus
- Species: C. marginatus

Binomial name
- Cottus marginatus T. H. Bean, 1881

Species of fish

The margined sculpin (Cottus marginatus) is a species of freshwater ray-finned fish belonging to the family Cottidae, the typical sculpins. It is found in the United States, inhabiting the Columbia River drainage from the Walla Walla River system, Washington, to the Umatilla River system in Oregon. It reaches a maximum length of 13.0 cm. It prefers rubble and gravel riffles.
