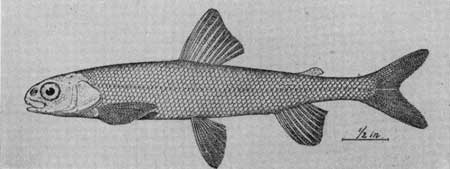

Scientific classification
- Kingdom: Animalia
- Phylum: Chordata
- Class: Actinopterygii
- Order: Salmoniformes
- Family: Salmonidae
- Genus: Prosopium
- Species: P. coulterii

Binomial name
- Prosopium coulterii (C. H. Eigenmann & R. S. Eigenmann, 1892)

= Pygmy whitefish =

Species of fish

The pygmy whitefish (Prosopium coulterii) is a freshwater whitefish of the genus Prosopium in the family Salmonidae. Found in the mountain streams and lakes in western North America, it also has isolated populations in Lake Superior and in Ekityki Lake, Chukchi Peninsula.

== Description ==
The pygmy whitefish is a small herring-like fish with a long and cylindrical body by comparison to other whitefishes. Silvery in colour, it has a brownish back, and a whitish belly. Black spots on the side called "parr marks", which are present on young trout or "parrs", are present on the young of this species, and on adults in some Alaskan populations. Commonly ranging from 3 to 15.3 centimetres (1.2 to 6.0 in) in length, it is typically 12 centimetres (4.7 in) long, and reaches a maximum length of 28 centimetres (11 in). It is identified by its small size, and its large eye, which has a greater length than its blunt snout. Its dorsal fin and pectoral fin are usually clear, and its tail is clear with a faint dark spot. Its anal fin and pelvic fin are plain whitish. It has large scales with only 56–70 on its lateral line, fewer gill rakers, all characteristics that indicate a degree of differentiation from the other Prosopium fishes. Because of this, it is considered sister to many of the other species in its genus, and it is the most trout-like member of a genus considered the most trout-like and primitive whitefish group.

== Taxonomy ==
The pygmy whitefish was first described by Carl H. Eigenmann and Rosa Smith Eigenmann in 1892, as Coregonus coulteri. they named the species after the prominent botanist John Merle Coulter. Since its initial description as a Coregonus, it has been placed in the genus Prosopium of more primitive whitefishes. The members of this genus are distinguished from the other whitefishes by several characteristics, such as a single flap of skin over the nostril, rather than one; "parr marks" as on trout and char; a round body; and a small toothless mouth. The genus name Prosopium, meaning "mask" in Greek, refers to the large bones in front of its eyes.

== Distribution ==
The pygmy whitefish is found mostly in the northern Rocky Mountains, with three other disjunct populations. One is in Lake Superior, another is in southwestern Alaska, and the third is in the Ekityki Lake, Chukchi Peninsula, Russia. The pygmy whitefish's range probably was continuous until the late Pleistocene. In the Rocky Mountains it is found in cold and rapid streams, and in cool lakes at depths of over 6 metres (20 ft). In Lake Superior it is found in cooler water, at depths of 18 to 89 metres (59 to 292 ft).

== Ecology ==
In Lake Superior, the pygmy whitefish spawns during November and December at depths of 31 to 46 metres (102 to 151 ft). Females lay an average of 362 orange eggs, with a diameter of 2.57 millimetres (0.101 in). Elsewhere, the pygmy whitefish migrates upstream to spawn, usually spawning in November or December in gravelly streams. Pygmy whitefish feed primarily on the aquatic larvae of insects, and crustaceans. In Lake Superior, the amphipod Pontoporeia and various other crustaceans, mostly ostracods, form 77 percent of the pygmy whitefish's diet. The burbot, kingfishers, and terns, and pikes have been recorded preying on the pygmy whitefish.

== Literature cited ==
- Alaska Natural Heritage Program (2005). "Pygmy Whitefish" Fishes Tracking List and Status Reports. Retrieved 10 February 2010.
- Behnke, Robert J. (2002). Trout and Salmon of North America. Free Press. ISBN 978-0-7432-2220-4.
- Becker, George C. (1983). Fishes of Wisconsin Madison, Wisconsin: University of Wisconsin Press. ISBN 0-299-08790-5
- Dickson, Tom (2008). The Great Minnesota Fish Book Minneapolis: University of Minnesota Press. ISBN 978-0-8166-5135-1
- Froese, Rainer; Pauly, Daniel (eds.). "Prosopium coulterii". FishBase. February 12 version.
- Hubbs, Carl C.; Lagler, Karl F.; and Smith, Gerald R. (2004). Fishes of the Great Lakes Region revised ed. Ann Arbor: University of Michigan Press. ISBN 0-472-11371-2
- Mackay, W. C. (2000). "Status of the Pygmy Whitefish (Prosopium coulteri) in Alberta." Wildlife Status Report 27 Edmonton, Alberta: Alberta Environment, Fisheries and Wildlife Management Division, and Alberta Conservation Association. Retrieved 16 February 2010
- Page, Lawrence M., and Burr, Brooks M. (1991). A Field Guide to Freshwater Fishes Boston: Houghton Mifflin. ISBN 0-395-91091-9
