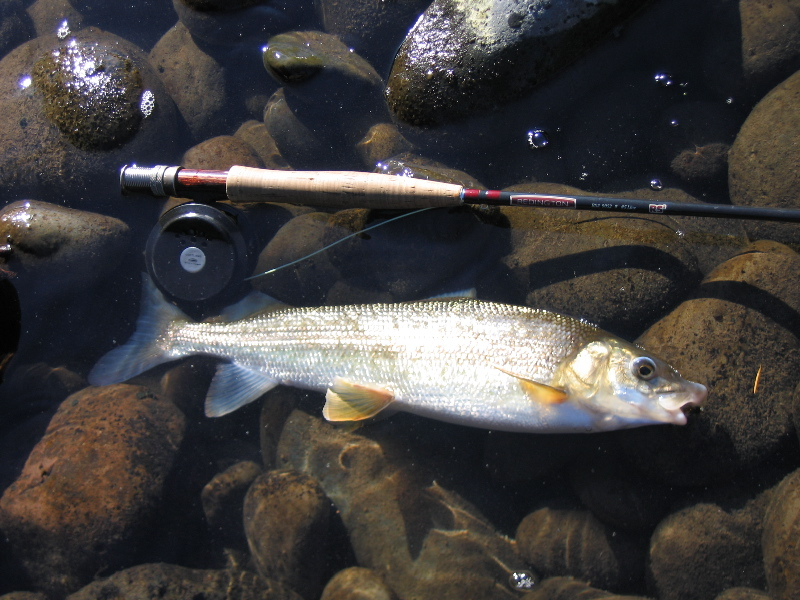
- 16 inches (41 cm) Mountain whitefish, McKenzie River, Oregon

Conservation status
- Secure (NatureServe)

Scientific classification
- Kingdom: Animalia
- Phylum: Chordata
- Class: Actinopterygii
- Division: Teleostei
- Order: Salmoniformes
- Family: Salmonidae
- Genus: Prosopium
- Species: P. williamsoni

Binomial name
- Prosopium williamsoni (Girard, 1856)

Synonyms
- Coregonus williamsoni Girard, 1856 Coregonus oregonius Jordan & Snyder, 1909 Prosopium oregonium (Jordan & Snyder, 1909)

= Mountain whitefish =

Species of fish

The mountain whitefish (Prosopium williamsoni) is one of the most widely distributed salmonid fish of western North America. It is found from the Mackenzie River drainage in Northwest Territories, Canada through western Canada and the northwestern USA in the Pacific, Hudson Bay and upper Missouri River basins to the Truckee River drainage in Nevada and Sevier River drainage in Utah.

== Description ==
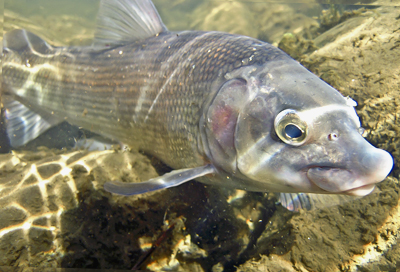
mountain whitefish underwater

The body shape is superficially similar to the cyprinids, although it is distinguished by having both the adipose fin and axillary process of salmonids. The body is slender and nearly cylindrical in cross section, generally silver with a dusky olive-green shade dorsally. The scales possess pigmented borders, which are especially defined on the posterior end.

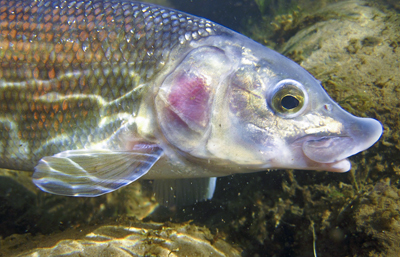
mountain whitefish underwater

Mountain whitefish possess a forked homocercal tail. The short head has a small mouth underneath the snout.

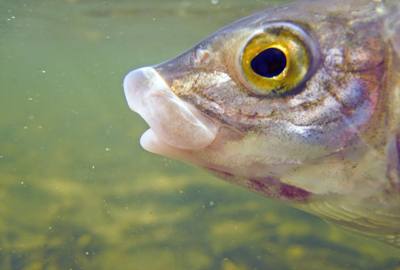
mountain whitefish underwater

The short dorsal fin has 12–13 rays, with 11–13 for the anal fin, 10–12 for the pelvic fins, and 14–18 for the pectoral fins. Size has been recorded at up to 70 centimeters (28 inches) in length and a weight of 2.9 kilograms (6.4 lb).

== Life history ==
The spawning season is from October to early December, when water temperatures are 2–6 °C. Mountain whitefish congregate in large schools on fall spawning runs and seek out areas of coarse gravels or cobbles at depths of at least 75 cm (30 inches), typically in shallow areas of small tributaries or shorelines of lakes. Their non-adhesive eggs are scattered along the substrate. The eggs then develop slowly through the winter (6–10 weeks), hatching in the early spring, generally in March. Mountain whitefish reach reproductive maturity at approximately three years old, females can produce as many as 4,000 eggs annually. Mountain whitefish typically live between 7–9 years in the wild.

== Feeding ==
Mountain whitefish are demersal feeders, stirring up the substrate with pectoral and tail fins to expose insect larvae and other invertebrates, including snails, crayfish, and amphipods. Their main feeding time is in the evening, but they will also take drifting prey during the day. The mountain whitefish frequently feeds in the lower strata of streams, but populations may rise to the surface to prey on hatching insects, including mayflies. Mountain whitefish fry are a common food source for other trout species.

== Ecology ==
=== Habitat ===
The mountain whitefish are commonly found in mountain streams and lakes, favoring clear cold water and large deep pools of at least a meter's depth; the Lake Tahoe population lives just above the bottom in deeper water.

=== Range ===
This species occurs throughout the western half of North America, as far north as the Mackenzie River (Canada) and the drainages of the Hudson Bay, in the Columbia River, upper Missouri River, upper Colorado River, Adirondack Lakes of New York, and Lake Champlain.

=== Migration ===
Mountain whitefish are non-anadromous fish and spend the majority of their lives in freshwater ecosystems. Relatively little is known about the migration patterns of whitefish, but it is believed that they do migrate for spawning and because of temperature fluctuations. In the Methow River, a tributary of the Columbia River, mountain whitefish have been found migrating due to increases in shallower tributary water temperatures into the larger Columbia River. Mountain whitefish have also been known to spend the winter in the Columbia River which provides more suitable habitats for these fishes. Evidence shows that mountain whitefish in the Methow River are returning annually to the same headwater tributaries, which indicates migration for the primary purpose of returning to birth streams to spawn – similar to other anadromous salmonid species.

=== Aging fish ===
To better understand the conservation and management needs of mountain whitefish biologists seek to understand life history strategies of these fishes. Understanding the growth, age structure, and age at maturity of these fish can better inform limitations on which fish can be harvested and which should be released. If the age at which the fish matures is known, management agencies can estimate sizes of these fishes and inform anglers that no fish under this maturation size may be kept to ensure new generations. The age of these fish can be determined by counting annuli (growth rings) in fish scales, pectoral fin rays, and otoliths (ear bones). Efficacy of these counting strategies can vary, but in combination they could provide vital data to ensure that mountain whitefish populations continue to stay at healthy levels. Some of the most effective ways to age mountain whitefish have been determined to be by examining scales for younger fishes or otoliths for older fishes.

== Conservation ==
Mountain whitefish have a secure conservation status. In many of the larger intermountain Western rivers, mountain whitefish are the only native salmonid. Mountain whitefish typically occur in high abundance, in the Snake River Basin in Idaho, mountain whitefish abundance was found to be 1,257/100 m. Historically, mountain whitefish are not popular game fish and have been thrown onto the banks when caught because they are 'trash fish.' Similar to other native salmonids, mountain whitefish have received backlash because anglers believe that they are competing for food and spawning resources for more popular introduced species, like brook trout (Idaho). Due to common misconceptions, some native mountain whitefish populations have been decimated by both management agencies and anglers alike. The health of mountain whitefish, like other salmonids, can be a predictor of the health of the environment that they live in, so understanding and maintaining their populations can be beneficial for ecosystem prosperity.
