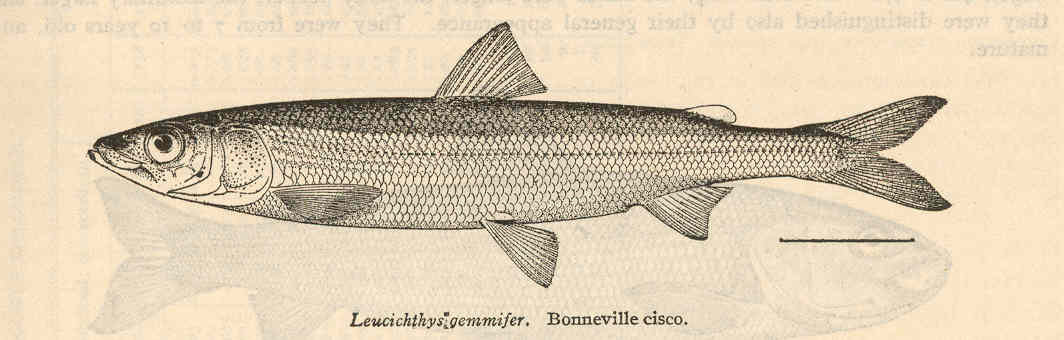

Conservation status
- Vulnerable (NatureServe)

Scientific classification
- Domain: Eukaryota
- Kingdom: Animalia
- Phylum: Chordata
- Class: Actinopterygii
- Order: Salmoniformes
- Family: Salmonidae
- Genus: Prosopium
- Species: P. gemmifer

Binomial name
- Prosopium gemmifer (Snyder, 1919)

= Bonneville cisco =

Species of fish

The Bonneville cisco (Prosopium gemmifer) is a freshwater cisco endemic to Bear Lake along the Utah-Idaho border of the United States. It is a popular ice-fishing target when the lake freezes and is caught by hand nets during the spawning season of January and February.

== Taxonomy ==
The Bonneville cisco was first described by John Otterbein Snyder in the early 1900s. The species name gemmifer is Latin for bearing or producing gems, and is likely a reference to the pearly tubercles that appear on this species when in spawning condition.

== Description ==
The mouth of the Bonneville cisco is terminal, with the lower jaw slightly extending past the upper jaw. The caudal fin is deeply forked. Normally, the scales of Bonneville cisco are light silver but may become golden, brassy, or yellow during spawning. The Bonneville cisco is generally less than 7.5 in (190 mm) in total length but has been reported up to 8.6 in (220 mm). Age estimation suggests that Bonneville cisco achieve maximum growth in the first two years of their life and can live over five years.

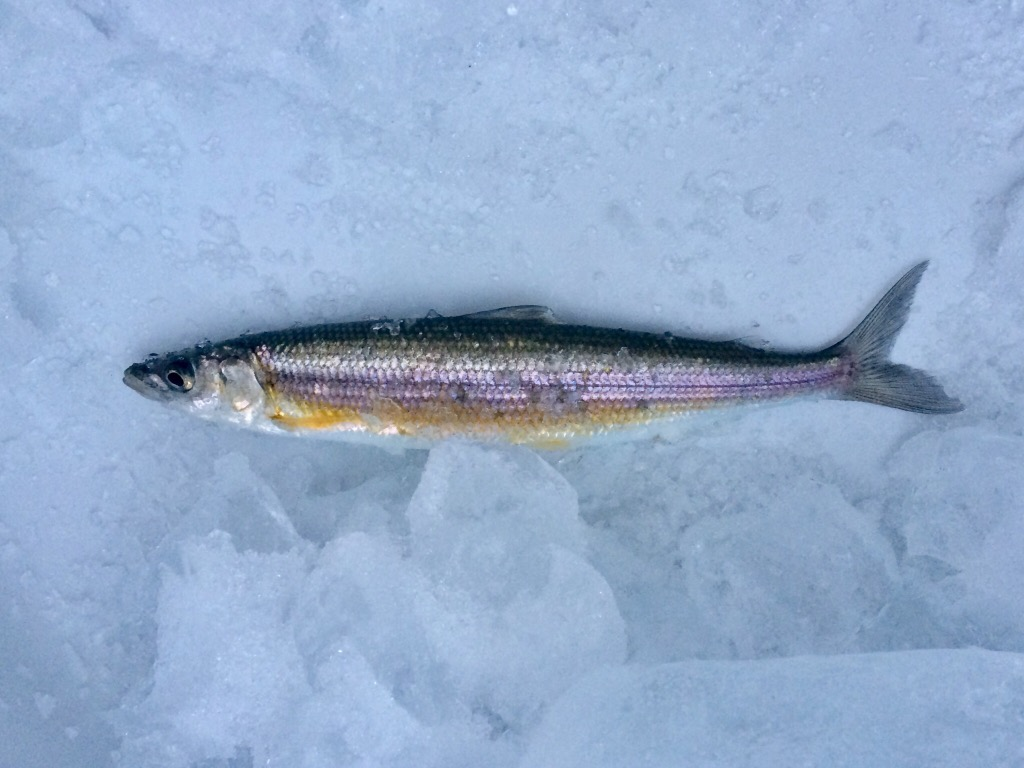
A Bonneville cisco caught at Bear Lake in February 2019.

== Distribution and habitat ==
The Bonneville cisco is only found in Bear Lake along the northern Utah-southern Idaho border. Bones of Bonneville cisco have also been identified in Homestead Cave, Utah where ancient Lake Bonneville once existed. Fishery managers attempted to introduce Bonneville cisco into Flaming Gorge Reservoir to provide additional forage to other gamefish, but stocking was unsuccessful at establishing a population. Within Bear Lake, Bonneville cisco can be found at all depths but show preference for cold water, specifically water below 59 °F (15 °C).

== Diet ==
Bonneville cisco predominantly prey upon small crustaceans such as Epischura and Bosmina and insects such as chironomids.

== Reproduction ==
Spawning generally occurs when water temperatures are between 36–39 °F (2–4 °C) in early to mid-January. During this time, Bonneville cisco form large schools over rocky substrate, predominantly in 2–5 ft (0.61–1.52 m) of water. Bonneville cisco are broadcast spawners and provide no parental care for young.

== Management ==
Currently, Bonneville cisco are considered a Wildlife Species of Concern by the Utah Division of Wildlife Resources and Vulnerable (G3) by NatureServe, mostly due to their limited distribution. Despite this ranking, the Bonneville cisco is locally abundant and can be legally harvested. Harvest generally occurs during winter while Bonneville cisco are spawning in shallow and easily accessible areas. The spawning run coincides with annual festivities inside Garden City and the Bear Lake lakeshore, with one such event dubbed the "Cisco Disco". Additionally, Bonneville cisco are important forage for lake trout (Salvelinus fontinalis) and Bonneville cutthroat trout (Oncorhynchus virginalis utah). Some anglers capture and freeze Bonneville cisco to use as bait to catch these predatory fish.
