= List of fishes of Colorado =

Coordinates: 38.9972°N 105.5478°W

The location of the State of Colorado in the United States of America.

The U.S. State of Colorado is home to 101 fishes, 55 of which are native. Twenty-three native species are threatened or endangered at either the federal or state level. The federally endangered species are the Humpback Chub (Gila cypha), Bonytail (Gila elegans), Colorado Pikeminnow (Ptychocheilus lucius), and Razorback Sucker (Xyrauchen texanus).

== Fishes ==
Common name	Scientific name		Description	Conservation status	Geographic range
Anguillidae
Catastomidae
River carpsucker	Carpiodes carpio		Native to eastern Colorado, river carpsuckers prefer to reside in large and deep rivers with sand or silt bottoms with slow moving but they can also be found in backwaters or smaller creeks. River carpsuckers are not considered an endangered species or a threat to humans. They can typically reach up to 12 to 18 inches in length, can weigh between 1 and 3 pounds, and have an average life span of 2 to 4 years.	LC	Found in Mississippi River Basin. Ranges from Pennsylvania to Montana, in the Gulf Slope and Rio Grande drainages.
Quillback	Carpiodes cyprinus		A reported fish in southeastern Colorado but there are no specimens in collection. The Quillback live in warm water rivers and warm water lakes inhabiting clear slow moving shallow waters. Quillbacks are omnivorous fish eating insects, aquatic crustaceans to leaves and algae. They are long-lived fish, living up to 11 years old and growing to about 15 to 20 inches in length.	LC	Found in Mississippi, Great Lakes, St. Lawrence, and Hudson Bay basins. Occurs in the Gulf Slope and Atlantic slope drainages near Delaware to Georgia.
Longnose sucker	Catostomus catostomus		Native to the eastern slopes of Colorado. They are known to reside in areas such as clear water lakes and streams. Longnose suckers also prefer moderate to faster-moving waters. The Longnose sucker can reach an average length of 15 to 20 inches, and weigh up 1 to 2 pounds. Longnose suckers are omnivores bottom feeders; they will slowly swim on the bottom searching for curstactions, invertebrates, algae and fish eggs to consume.	LC	Occurs in the Atlantic, Arctic, Pacific, and Great Lakes basins. Can be found in the majority of drainages contained in these basins including Delaware, Columbia, and Colorado drainages.
White sucker	Catostomus commersoni		Native to the eastern slopes of Colorado and later introduced to the western slopes. The white sucker can usually be found in cool clear rivers, streams, and lakes. white suckers will usually be feeding on aquatic plants, algae, and invertebrates. The white sucker can be found reaching a length of 20 inches and about 2–3 pounds. The life expectancy of a white sucker will usually be around 15 years.	LC	Found in Atlantic, Arctic, Great Lakes, and Mississippi basins. Encompasses most of Canada and much of the Northern United States.
Bluehead sucker	Catostomus discobolus		Native to the western slopes of Colorado. The Bluehead sucker is usually found in headwater streams to large rivers, requiring a medium to fast pace of water making them absent from lakes. Bluehead suckers also prefer beds composed of rock substrate. Bluehead suckers will feed on algae, invertebrates, and materials scraped from rock.	LC	Commonly found in the Snake River system. Extends into several south-western states through the Colorado River drainage.
Flannelmouth sucker	Catostomus latipinnis		Native to Colorado, ranged in the western slopes and waters of Colorado. The flannelmouth sucker inhabits large streams and rivers with turbid waters and sand or muddy bottoms. Known as a bottom feeder, the flannelmouth sucker will feed on algae and invertebrates. The flannelmouth sucker can reach up to sizes of 28 inches and can live up to 30 years of age. Also a bottom feeder, the flannelmouth sucker will feed on algae and invertebrates such as aquatic insect larvae.	LC	Colorado River drainage system, extending from Wyoming into the Southwest United States.
Mountain sucker	Catostomus platyrhynchus		Native to northwestern Colorado. The mountain sucker inhabits smaller rivers and streams with gravel, sand, and mud bottoms. They are also found in eddies and small pools with a medium current. Younger suckers will reside in shallower eddies and back waters. The mountain sucker will feed on algae, insects, and larvae.		Found through much of western Canada and US. Range includes the Saskatchewan, Fraser, Missouri, and Colorado river drainages.
Rio Grande sucker	Catostomus plebeius		Native to southern Colorado. The Rio Grande sucker inhabits areas such as rocky pools, runs, and small to medium-sized rivers. They prefer rapidly flowing water for cover, where they will generally feed on algae and small invertebrates.	LC	Found in the Rio Grande and Pacific Slope drainage systems in the Gila River system.
Smallmouth buffalo	Ictiobus bubalus		Not native to Colorado. The smallmouth buffalo can be found in rivers and lakes, but they prefer clean water or mildly turbid waters. Warm and deep waters with abundant vegetation is most productive for this fish. Smallmouth buffalo will feed on shellfish, algae, insects and other bottom organisms. The smallmouth buffalo can reach up to lengths of 36 inches and weigh from 2 to 10 pounds.	LC	Found in a variety of systems, including the Great Lakes, Hudson Bay, and Mississippi River basins. Extends into the Gulf Slope drainages.
Shorthead redhorse	Moxostoma macrolepidotum		Not native to Colorado. The shorthead redhorse fish usually tends to reside in lakes and are found on the shallower end of the waters in areas with sand and gravel substrate. Shorthead redhorses prefer clean clear water over polluted turbid waters. Their diet consists of small mollusks, insects, insect larvae, and other aquatic invertebrates. Shorthead redhorse fish are known to grow up to 25 inches, but are typically 12 to 18 inches weighing in about two to three pounds.	LC	Commonly found in the Great Lakes basin, but also extends into the St. Lawrence, Hudson Bay, and the Mississippi river basin. Extends into the Atlantic Slope drainages.
Razorback sucker	Xyrauchen texanus		Native to western Colorado. The razorback sucker is a large, native Colorado sucker that can grow up to 20 inches and weigh up to 2–3 pounds. Found in deeper waters from 4–10 feet, the adults will stick to strong currents and feed off of algae and invertebrates.	CR	Native to the Colorado River basin, it is currently known to only inhabit the lower Colorado River system above the Grand Canyon.
	Centrarchidae (family)				
Sacramento perch	Archoplites interruptus		Not native to Colorado. They inhabit areas such as sloughs, lakes, ponds, and slow moving rivers. They are adaptive fish and reside in areas with clear waters with vegetated bottoms or turbid waters with rocky bottoms. Sacramento perch will feed on insects, insect larvae, aquatic crustaceans, and small fish. Typically about 12 inches in length and about three quarters of a pound, but have been known to reach a length of 24 inches in the state of California.	EN	Native to the Sacramento River system. Extends into the Sacramento-San Joaquin, Pajaro, and Salinas River drainages. Also known to occur in Clear Lake, California.
Rock bass	Ambloplites rupestris		Not native to Colorado. Rock bass inhabit areas such as clear water streams, rivers, and lakes. They prefer areas with cover such as rock piles, large boulders, and tree roots they are usually found along the shoreline of water sources. The rock bass's primary diet consists of aquatic insects, crawfish and minnows. Rock bass will typically grow up to 7 to 10 inches.	LC	Found throughout much of the continental United States. Present in the Mississippi, St. Lawrence, Great Lakes, and Hudson Bay river basins. Drainage systems include the Atlantic, Missouri, and Arkansas systems.
Green sunfish	Lepomis cyanellus		Native to Colorado and found in small lakes in ponds. This is a common fish that will generally over-populate in lakes and ponds. The green sunfish will eat anything that will fit in their mouths such as insects, small fish, small crayfish, and frogs. The Green sunfish usually resides in a wide range of environments depending on the conditions. The typical length of this fish is between three and six inches.	LC	Native to the Great Lakes, Hudson Bay, and Mississippi River basins. Drainage systems include the Gulf Slope and Pacific drainages, with the latter being introduced into.
Pumpkinseed	Lepomis gibbosus		Not native to Colorado. This sunfish usually resides in heavily vegetated lakes, ponds, shallow waters, near cover such as weeds, docks, and sunken vegetation. The pumpkinseed is typically six to eight inches in length and can typically live up to eight years of age. These fish forge on insects, insect larvae, crustaceans, and small fish.	LC	Native to the Mississippi, Great Lakes, and Hudson Bay river basins. Found in both Atlantic and Pacific drainages, being introduced into the latter.
Warmouth	Lepomis gulosus		Native to Colorado. Warmouth reside in lakes, ponds, and swamps, as well as slow moving streams. They prefer muddy or vegetated bottoms and will take cover in rocky banks or near stumps. Warmouth are sight feeders and will feed on crayfish, insects and small fish. A typical size for a warmouth is 4 to 10 inches in length.	LC	Native to the Great Lakes and Mississippi River basins, extending into the Atlantic and Gulf Slope drainages. Introduced into Pacific drainages.
Orangespotted sunfish	Lepomis humilis		Native to northern Colorado. Similar to the green sunfish they will stick close to cover such as rocks, stumps, and weeds. Orangespotted sunfish can be found in slow moving waters and turbid waters but are mostly found in large muddy rivers and reservoirs. The orange spotted sunfish will feed on insects, crawfish, larve, and small fish. These fish will grow to be typically 2–3 inches in length.	LC	Present in the Great Lakes, Hudson Bay, and Mississippi River systems. Extends into the Gulf Slope drainage system.
Bluegill	Lepomis macrochirus		Native to Colorado. Bluegill prefer to reside in weed beds and deep drop off points in lakes and ponds, as well as in slow moving streams and lagoons. They will usually stay near brush piles and under overhanging trees casting a shadow. Bluegill will feed on insects, larvae, worms, crawfish and small fish. A common length for a bluegill will be about 7.5 inches in length and can live a life span of four to six years, but some have been known to live up to 11 years.	LC	Native to the St. Lawrence, Great Lakes, and Mississippi River basins. Extends into Gulf Slope and Atlantic drainages.
Smallmouth bass	Micropterus dolomieu		Not native to Colorado. Smallmouth bass prefer large clear lakes and reservoirs but can also be found in clear streams. These fish prefer gravel rocky bottoms and will favor structures such as logs, trees, rocks, and dam faces. Smallmouth bass's primary diet is small fish, crayfish, and insects. A typical smallmouth bass will range from 8 to 12 inches in length. They can live up to 12 years of age and will mature by three to four years of age.	LC	Native to the St. Lawrence, Great Lakes, Hudson Bay, and Mississippi River basins. Widely introduced, it is common on the Atlantic Slope drainages.
Largemouth bass	Micropterus salmoides		Not native to Colorado. The largemouth bass resides in shallow water habitats such as reeds, water lilies, and other vegetation. Largemouth bass prefer no current and clear water lakes and ponds. Bass will feed on minnows, carp, trout, crawfish and any other species of fish that is available, even their own. A typical length for bass will be about 15 inches and one to two pounds.	LC	Believed to be native to the St. Lawrence, Mississippi, and Great Lakes basins. Extends into the Atlantic and Gulf drainage systems.
White crappie	Promoxis annularis		Not native to Colorado. White crappies typically inhabit reservoirs and freshwater lakes but will also be found in ponds and slow moving rivers with bottoms of sand or mud. White crappies usually don't mind turbid or clear water. White crappie will typically reach a varied length of 6 to 20 inches and will weigh from 1 to 5 pounds. Their primary diet is mainly zooplankton and small crustaceans as juveniles and minnows and small shads as adults.	LC	Native to Great Lakes, Hudson Bay, and Mississippi River basins. Extends into the Gulf drainages.
Black crappie	Pomoxis nigromaculatus		Not native to Colorado. Black crappies reside; in lakes, reservoirs as well as rivers, streams, and backwaters. They usually are found in clear water with vegetated surrounds and mud or sandy bottoms. Black crappies can grow up to 19.3 inches in length but are typically 10.8 inches in length. As juveniles black crappie will feed on zooplankton and crustaceans and insect larvae while when adults they will primarily feed on small fish.	LC	Native range too difficult to pinpoint; Found in almost every US basin system including the St. Lawrence, Great Lakes, Mississippi, and Hudson Bay basins.
	Clupeidae (family)				
Gizzard shad	Dorosoma cepedianum		Native to Colorado. Gizzard shad are found in large rivers, lakes, and swamps. Gizzard shad can be found in clear to turbid waters in open water areas. Gizzard shad will feed primarily on plankton, algae, and plant debris. Gizzard shad can live up to 10 to 11 years of age but will typically live from 5 to 7 years of age. The Gizzard shad can reach length up to 18 inches and bigger but the typical size of a gizzard shad is between 8 and 14 inches.	LC	Found in St Lawrence, Great Lakes, Mississippi, Atlantic, and Gulf drainage systems.
Threadfin shad	Dorosoma petenense		Not native to Colorado. The Threadfin shad is usually found in large rivers, lakes, and reservoirs usually near rocky banks or open water. Threadfin shad will generally feed on algae, plankton, and microscopic organisms. The Threadfin shad will typically grow to about 5 to 7 inches but can grow to lengths of 9 inches.	LC	Native to Gulf Slope drainages. Introduced into Mississippi, Atlantic, and Colorado River drainages.
	Cichlidae (family)				
Tilapia	Tilapia spp.			NE	Native to Africa and Jordan Valley. Stocked for aquaculture, populations have been established in a multitude of states.
	Cottidae (family)				
Mottled sculpin	Cottus bairdi		Native to Colorado. The Mottled sculpin is generally found in creeks, rivers, lakes and reservoirs. They prefer areas with gravel or rocky bottoms with swift waters. The Mottled sculpin will feed on aquatic insects, larvae, crustaceans, small fish, and fish eggs. Mottled sculpin typically will reach a length of 3–3.6 inches but can reach a length of 5 inches. Their life span is usually around three years of age and will very rarely reach the age of 4 years old.	LC	Highly widespread across the continental United States. Basins include the Arctic, Atlantic, and Mississippi. Drainages include the Tennessee, Missouri, Colorado, and Columbia systems.
Paiute sculpin	Cottus beldingi		Native to Colorado. Paiute sculpin are usually found in cold clear streams with rocky bottoms but can also be found in lakes as well. The Paiute sculpin will primarily feed on snails, algae, and detritus. Paiute sculpin can reach a length up to 2.5 to 4 inches long but have been known to grow to 5 inches.	LC	Present in the Columbia River Drainage system.
	Cyprinidae (family)				
Central stoneroller	Campostoma anomalum		Native to Colorado. The Central stoneroller can be found in streams with sand or gravel substrate. They prefer areas with riffles and pools but can tolerate many different waters as long as there is a food supply. Central stonerollers will feed on algae and detritus. Their typically range from lengths is 3 to 5 inches but are known to reach lengths of 7 inches.	LC	Widespread species found in the Atlantic, Great Lakes, Mississippi, and Hudson Bay basins. Extends into the Gulf Slope drainages.
Goldfish	Carassius auratus		Not native to Colorado. Although originating from china goldfish prefer living in slow moving waters. They are fairly similar to their cousin the common carp, they Thrive murky waters with plants and dirt at the bottom are ideal conditions for Goldfish. Goldfish will eat plants, insects, insect larvae, curastactions, and zooplankton. Goldfish have been known to live long lives up to 41 years of age.	LC	Native to Asia, but introduced into most of the major river systems of the US and Canada.
Northern redbelly dace	Chrosomus eos		Native to Colorado. Northern redbelly dace will usually inhabit streams with emergent aquatic plants. Northern redbelly dace will grow to about 3 inches in length and weigh about 2 grams. The Northern redbelly dace will usually live up to about 3 years of age. The Northern redbelly dace's daily diet will consist of algae, diatoms, water fleas, and small insect larvae.	LC	Found in the Atlantic, Great Lakes, Hudson Bay, and Mississippi basins. Extends into the upper Mississippi, Missouri, and Peace-Mackenzie drainages.
Southern redbelly dace	Chrosomus erythrogaster		Native to Colorado. They will inhabit cold, clear streams with sand, gravel, or mud substrate. The Southern redbelly also prefers areas with overhanging vegetation allowing for cover over banks. The Southern redbelly dace will feed on algae, aquatic invertebrate, and detritus.	LC	Found in Lake Erie, Michigan, and Mississippi basins. Extends into the Tennessee, Alabama, White, and Arkansas River drainages.
Lake chub	Couesius plumbeus		Native to Colorado. The Lake chub is generally found in lakes but can also be found in cold clear rivers and streams. They usually prefer areas with shallow waters and sandy bottoms. Juvenile lake chubs will focus their diets on aquatic crustaceans such as cladocerans and copepods while adults will change to insects.	LC	Found through much of the northern US and Canada. Some populations may be present in the Missouri River drainage, but prefers higher latitude.
Grass carp	Ctenopharyngodon idella		Not native to Colorado. Grass carp will usually inhibit areas such as lakes, ponds, pools, and backwaters. The Grass carp will generally stick close to shallow waters being herbivores and benefiting from all the aquatic plants they can feed on. Grass carp can reach up to sizes of 48 inches and weigh up to 50 pounds while typical lengths and weights are 24 inches and 14 pounds.	LC	Native to East Asia. Present in the majority of the United States.
Red shiner	Cyprinella lutrensis		Native to Colorado. The Red shiner resides in streams and rivers with deeper pools and silty conditions. The Red shiner will primarily feed on aquatic insects and algae. Red shiners tend to reach an average length of 3 inches.	LC	Found in the Mississippi River basin and extends into the Gulf drainages.
Common carp	Cyprinus carpio		Not native to Colorado. The common carp are known to inhabit lakes, ponds, and rivers. The common carp is an omnivorous species that will consume vegertion, detirus, algae, small crustaceans, aquatic plants, and benthic organisms. Common carp will typically reach 1 to 2 feet in length and weigh from 1 to 8 pounds, but have been known to reach up to 30 or 40 pounds. Common carp are known to live long lives reported up to 47 years of age.	LC	Native to Eurasia but was introduced to most major river systems in the US.
Utah chub	Gila atraria			LC	Found in the Snake River, Lake Bonneville, and Missouri Basins. Drainages include the Colorado and Great Salt Lake drainage systems.
Humpback chub	Gila cypha		Native to Colorado. It is known to only reside in rivers but prefers slower eddies and pools with bottoms of sand, gravel, or rock substrate. Humpback chubs can reach up to lengths of 20 inches in and weigh up to 2.5 pounds. Humpback chubs are known to be a long living fish having a life span of up to 30 years. The Humpback chub is an opportunistic omnivore, their diet consists of insects, crustaceans, plants, seeds, small fish, and reptiles.	EN	Found in the Colorado River drainage system.
Brassy minnow	Hybognathus hankinsoni		Native to Colorado. The brassy minnow is known to reside in stream channels, pools, backwaters, and beaver ponds with abundant vegetation. The brassy minnows diet will primarily consist of plankton. Brassy minnows will typically grow to lengths of 2 to 3 inches in length.	LC	Found in the Great Lakes, Mississippi, Hudson Bay, and Missouri river basins.
Plains minnow	Hybognathus placitus		Native to Colorado. The Plains minnow can be found in shallow streams or small to large rivers with sandy bottoms. A typical length of a plains minnow is about 5 inches. They will generally eat algae, organic materials and some invertebrates.	LC	Found in the Missouri, Arkansas, Red, Brazos, and Colorado River drainage systems.
Bonytail chub	Gila elegans		Native to Colorado. The bonytail chub is usually found in streams and rivers. The Bonytail chub can be measured to be over 2 feet long and live over 30 years long. The primary diet of a Bonytail chub is insects, small fish, worms, algae, plankton, and plant debris.	CR	Found in the Colorado River drainage system.
Rio Grande chub	Gila pandora		Native to Colorado. The Rio Grande chub resides in streams, impoundments and lakes but is known to also inhibit engineered waterways and irrigation ditches. They usually prefer areas with sand and cobble substrates. The Rio Grande Chubs are omnivores creatures that will consume vegetation, detritus, crustaceans, insects, invertebrates, plankton, and small fish. Rio Grande Chub can grow as long as 12inches but for Colorado about 5 inches in length.	LC	Found in the upper Rio Grande and Pecos River systems.
Roundtail chub	Gila robusta		Native to Colorado. The Roundtail chub will inhabit rivers and streams and will occupy the deepest pools available. They will find areas where there is cover such as boulders, overhanging cliffs and overhanging vegetation. The Roundtail chub will live up to 7 years of age and typically will be 9 inches to 12 inches long but have been reported to be at least 19 inches long. The diet of a Roundtail chub will consist of aquatic macroinvertebrates, larvae, and nymphs.		Found in the Colorado River drainage system.
Common shiner	Luxilus cornutus		Native to Colorado. The Common shiner will reside in lakes and rivers. While in lakes they will prefer to live in vegetated areas and in rivers they reside in areas of gravel and rubble substrate. The diets of Common shiners will consist of aquatic insects, larvae, and algae. The Common shiner will usually grow up to lengths of 6 to 7 inches in length.	LC	Found in the Atlantic, Great Lakes, Hudson Bay, and Mississippi River basins. Extends into the James River drainage.
Speckled chub	Macrhybopsis aestivalis		Native to Colorado. The Speckled chub will usually be found in small to large rivers with sand or gravel bottoms. Speckled chub will feed on aquatic insects and larvae. The speckled Chub will usually grow up to 3 inches in length but can reach a maximum length of 6 inches.	LC	Found in the Rio Grande and San Fernando River drainage systems.
Hornyhead chub	Nocomis biguttatus		Native to Colorado. The Hornyhead chub will inhabit streams with gravel and sand bottoms. The Hornyhead chub also prefers streams with slower currents. The Hornyhead chub will feed on aquatic invertebrates, and terrestrial insects. They will usually reach lengths from 4–7 inches in length but are known to reach lengths of up to 9 inches.	LC	Very common in the US. Found in the Mohawk, Mississippi, and Great Lakes basins. Drainages include the Red River, Ohio, Kentucky, Ozark, Platte, and Cheyenne river systems.
River shiner	Notropis blennius		Not native to Colorado. The River shiner resides in rivers and streams that usually have sand or gravel bottoms. The River shiner usually has a diet that consists of invertebrates and terrestrial insects. River shiners are a typical length of 3–4 inches but can reach a length of 5 inches.	LC	Found in the Hudson Bay and Mississippi River basins. Drainages include the Lake Michigan and Red River drainages.
Golden shiner	Notemigonus crysoleucas		Not native to Colorado. The Golden shiner will usually be found in calm quiet waters such as lakes, ponds, and sloughs with aquatic vegetation. Their diet will usually consist of crustaceans, algae, insects, and plankton. Golden shiners will grow to be about 3–7 inches in length but are known to exceed 12 inches in length.	LC	Found in the Great Lakes, Hudson Bay, and Mississippi River basins. Native to the Atlantic and Gulf slope drainages.
Bigmouth shiner	Notropis dorsalis		Native to Colorado. They will most likely be found in pools from creeks and rivers with a sandy substrate. The Bigmouth shiner will feed on aquatic invertebrates, terrestrial insects, and algae. The typical length of a bigmouth shiner is 2 to 3 inches but can reach 3.5 inches.	LC	Found in Great Lakes, Mississippi, and Hudson Bay basins. Extends into the Platte River system.
Arkansas River shiner	Notropis girardi		Not native to Colorado. The Arkansas river shiner will inhabit areas such as large rivers and streams with shallow sandy bottoms. Arkansas river shiners will usually consume small aquatic insects, invertebrates, and insect larvae for their diet. Adult Arkansas river shiners will grow to about 2 inches in length.	VU	Currently found in the Arkansas River Basin.
Spottail shiner	Notropis hudsonius		Not native to Colorado. Spottail shiners will inhabit lakes or rivers and will often be found over sand or gravel. The spottail shiner will feed on aquatic invertebrates, plankton, and cladocerans. Spottail shiners will typically reach the lengths of 3.5 to 6 inches long.	LC	Found in the Arctic, Great Lakes, and Mississippi River Basins. Extends into the Atlantic and Gulf Slope drainages.
Sand shiner	Notropis stramineus		Native to Colorado. They inhabit rivers of varied sizes as well as streams with sand or fine gravel substrates. Sand shiners depending on region will prefer clearer water over turbid water and vice versa. Sand shiners will feed on aquatic invertebrates, terrestrial invertebrates, and will also eat phytoplankton. Sand Shiners will have a lifespan of about three years and will grow to about 4.4 cm and 8.2 cm.	LC	Found in the St. Lawrence, Great Lakes, Hudson Bay, and Mississippi basins. Extends into the Colorado and Ohio River from the Gulf slope drainages.
Suckermouth minnow	Phenacobius mirabilis		Native to Colorado. They inhabit streams medium to large rivers and prefer turbid waters. The Suckerminnow will feed on small invertebrates such as chironomid large, tricioteran larvae, chironomid pupae as well as plankton. The suckermouth minnow will reach up to 2 to 4 inches in length but is not uncommon to reach lengths of 5 inches.	LC	Found mostly in the Mississippi River basin. Drainages include the Lake Erie and Gulf drainages.
Fathead minnow	Pimephales promelas		Native to Colorado. They inhabit small streams, ponds, and lakes and are very tolerant of most types of water clarity and pH levels. Fathead minnows will eat organic debris, aquatic insects and zooplankton in their daily diet. Fathead minnows can grow up to 4 inches in length but will usually range between 2–3 inches.	LC	Found throughout most of the United States. River systems include the Colorado River drainage system.
Flathead chub	Platygobio gracilis		Native to Colorado. The Flathead chub will reside in rivers and streams with moderate levels of turbidity. They also prefer areas with gravel substrate. Flathead chubs will consume aquatic invertebrates, terrestrial insects, and algae in their daily diet. The Flathead chub can also grow up to 12 inches in length.	LC	Found in the Mississippi and Missouri River basins. Drainages include the Mackenzie, Saskatchewan, Lake Winnipeg, Arkansas, and Rio Grande drainages.
Colorado pikeminnow	Ptychocheilus lucius		Native to Colorado. The Colorado pikeminnow will usually inhabit rivers and quiet backwaters. Juvenile Colorado pikeminnow will feed on insects and plankton while adults will primarily feed on fish. Colorado pikeminnow being one of the largest minnows will typically reach lengths of 20 inches with the biggest reported being 70 inches long.	LC	Found only in the Colorado River drainage system.
Bullhead minnow	Pimephales vigilax			LC	Found in the Mississippi River Basin. Drainages include the Gulf Slope drainages into the Rio Grande system.
Longnose dace	Rhinichthys cataractae		Native to Colorado. Longnose dace will usually inhabit lakes, streams, and springs with rocky bottoms. The Longnose dace will feed on aquatic insects, algae, and fish eggs. The average longnose dace will typically be 2 to 4 inches in length, but some are known to reach about 5 inches.	LC	Occurs through most of the US. Specific drainage systems include the Mackenzie and Rio Grande drainage systems.
Speckled dace	Rhinichthys osculus		Native to Colorado. The Speckled dace will usually reside in streams, springs, lakes, and rivers. They prefer areas that have quiet, clear, and well oxygenated water. The speckled dace will feed on small invertebrates, algae, nymphs, and plankton. Speckled dace will typically grow to about 4 inches in length and live up to three years.	LC	Widespread fish. Range includes western drainages such as the Columbia and Colorado drainage systems.
Redside shiner	Richardsonius balteatus		Not native to Colorado. The Redside shiner will inhabit areas such as lakes, ponds, and rivers with a slow current to a non-existent current. The Redside shiner will consume plankton, aquatic insects, and snails in their diet. Redside shiners will grow to a length of about 7 inches long.	LC	Found in the Arctic, Bonneville, and Missouri basins. Drainages include Rogue, Klamath, Columbia, and Colorado River drainages.
Creek chub	Semotilus atromaculatus		Native to Colorado. The Creek chub will usually reside in small streams. Creek chubs will feed on insects, small fishes, crayfish, worms, and mollusks as their diet. The Creek chubs will typically measure up to 4 to 8 inches in length and can reach up to 12 inches in length.	LC	Found in Atlantic, Great Lakes, Hudson Bay, Mississippi, and Gulf basins. Common throughout the US.
Tench	Tinca tinca		Not native to Colorado. The Tench will usually inhabit areas such as shallow lakes, rivers, and backwaters with abundant vegetation. The Tench will consume algae, vegetation, detritus, snails, mosquito larvae, and other small organisms. Tench can reach up to 33 inches in length, weigh up to 16.5 pounds and live up to 20 years.	LC	Introduced species. Found through much of the US, including the Colorado River basin.
	Esocidae (family)				
Northern pike	Esox lucius		Not native to Colorado. The Northern pike will inhabit areas such as streams, large rivers, and lakes with dense vegetation. The Northern is a carnivorous fish and will eat fish, frogs, waterfowl and anything that is smaller than themselves. Northern pike are known to be 24 to 30 inches long and weigh 3 to 7 pounds but the largest pike was known to be 58 inches long and weighed 68 pounds.	LC	Highly widespread. Found in the Atlantic, Arctic, Pacific, Great Lakes, and Mississippi River basins.
Tiger muskellunge	E. lucius × E. masquinongy		Not native to Colorado. The Tiger Muskellunge resides in lakes and large rivers with rocky bottoms and heavy cover, they also prefer shallow waters. Tiger Muskellunge diet will consist of fish, frogs, waterfowl, mice and other mammals and birds. The Tiger Muskellunge can grow up to 22 to 50 inches long and weigh from 3 to 40 pounds and will live up to 10 years.	Hybrid, occurs where northern pike and muskellunge range overlaps.	
	Fundulidae (family)				
Plains topminnow	Fundulus sciadicus		Native to Colorado. The Plains topminnow usually inhabits streams, oxbows, and ditches. They will generally feed on insects, ostracods, gastropods, and snails. The Plains topminnow will rarely grow larger than 2.5 inches in length.	LC	Found primarily in the Missouri River basin. Drainages include the Missouri drainage system.
Plains killifish	Fundulus zebrinus		Native to Colorado. The Plains killifish inhabits shallow sandy runs, ponds, and streams with sandy bottoms. The plains killifish will reach about 4 inches in length and will have a life span of 3 years.	LC	Native to the Mississippi and Gulf Slope basins. Extends into the Colorado and Pecos river drainages.
	Gasterosteidae (family)				
Brook stickleback	Culaea inconstans		Not native to Colorado. The Brook stickleback inhabits areas such as rivers, streams, lakes, and ponds that have cool and clear waters, with abundant vegetation. The Brook stickleback will grow to about 2.4 inches and will live up to 3 years.	LC	Found in the Mississippi and Great Lakes basins. Drainages include both the Arctic and the Atlantic drainage systems.
	Ictaluridae (family)				
Black bullhead	Ameiurus melas		Is a native species to Colorado. The black bullhead inhabits small creeks, rivers, ponds, and lakes. The Black bullhead will consume ostracods, amphipods, copepods, and insects. Black bullheads usually have a typical lifespan of five years and the typical lengths will be about 4 to 14 inches and weigh about 1.5 to 8 pounds.	LC	Native to the Great Lakes, Hudson Bay and Mississippi river basins. Present in Gulf slope drainages.
Yellow bullhead	Ameiurus natalis		Is non-native species in Colorado. The Yellow bullhead will reside in streams, lakes, ponds, and large bays with rock, sand, and clay substrates. The Yellow bullhead will also eat minnows, crayfish, insects, larvae, aquatic invertebrates, worms, and vegetation. The Yellow bullhead will have an average life span of 4 years and can grow up from 8 inches to 10 inches in length.	LC	Found in the St. Lawrence, Great Lakes, and Mississippi river basins. Drainages include the Atlantic and Gulf slope drainages.
Brown bullhead	Ameiurus nebulosus		Can be found in lakes and rivers. They will feed on fish, crayfish, and aquatic insects but will often scavenge on dead fish or other animals. Brown bullheads will typically grow to 8 to 16 inches long and weigh 1 to 2 pounds. They have been known to grow up to 20 inches in length and weigh about 4 pounds.	LC	Found in the St. Lawrence, Great Lakes, Hudson Bay, and Mississippi river basins. Drainages include the Atlantic and Gulf slope drainages.
Blue catfish	Ictalurus furcatus		Can be found in rivers, lakes and reservoirs with hard to soft bottoms such as gravel, boulders, rock ripraps, sand and silt. The Blue catfish will eat fish, crayfish, molluscs, and frogs. Blue catfish can grow up to 5 ft long and weigh up to more than 100 lbs. Blue catfish looks a lot like the channel catfish but the different is that the differentiate of the spine on the anal fin is different.	LC	Introduced into many river systems. Found in the Mississippi river basin, additional drainages include the Platte, Gulf Slope, Escambia, and Rio Grande drainage systems.
Channel catfish	Ictalurus punctatus		Inhabit rivers, streams, lakes, ponds and reservoirs. They prefer to live in clean well oxygenated water. Their diet consists of crustaceans, clams, snails, aquatic insects, fish, birds, and other small animals. Channel catfish can get up to 52 inches and weigh at almost 58 lbs. The oldest reported channel catfish to live was around 24 years old.	LC	Native to the St. Lawrence, Great Lakes, Hudson Bay, Missouri, and Mississippi river basins. Drainages include the Atlantic and Gulf slope drainages.
Flathead catfish	Pylodictus olivaris		Can be found in large bodies of water, large rivers with deep pools or lots of cover like driftwood and timber. They are omnivorous and opportunistic and eat whatever is available to them. They prey on insects, crayfish, clam, and small fish. The small fish they eat are like sunfish, shiners, and shad. They used their barbels and dermal taste buds to locate their food. They are quick at growing and can grow up to probably 30 inches or more but can weigh up to 50 pounds length.	LC	Found in the Great Lakes and Mississippi river basins. Drainages include the Gulf Slope and Mobile Bay drainages systems.
Stonecat	Noturus flavus		Are found in large creeks and small rivers. Stonecat used their barbels and dermal taste buds to locate food. They will feed on insects, aquatic crustaceans, and fish. They can live up to 7 years and can grow up to 12 inches long.	LC	Found in the St Lawrence, Great Lakes, Hudson Bay, and Mississippi river basins. Drainages include the Hudson Bay drainage system.
	Moronidae (family)				
Wiper (hybrid striped bass)	M. chrysops × M. saxatilis		A hybrid between Morone chrysops (white bass) and Morone saxatilis (striped bass). Wiper forages the same as a White bass and a Striped bass primarily eating gizzard shad, silversides, yellow perch and various sunfish. Wiper prefer to be in open water and only come close to shore or rock to feed on the baitfish it is chasing. They are stock in large lakes, reservoirs and can be found in rivers too. Wiper are known to grow more than 30 inches and also weigh in at 27 pounds or more.	NE	Hybrid, likely occurs where white and striped bass ranges overlap.
White bass	Morone chrysops		Lives in lakes, ponds and rivers. White bass do not like muddy water or areas with vegetation and prefer open water or rocky parts. White bass feed on small invertebrates like small crustaceans, midge larvae, and small species of fishes. White bass common length size is 12.5 inches but can grow up to 17 inches and more. The longest living white bass recorded was 9 years. Climate usually affects how long it takes a White Bass to mature into an adult.	LC	Found in St. Lawrence, Great Lakes, Hudson Bay, and Mississippi river basins. Drainages include the Gulf Slope drainages into the Rio Grande system.
Striped bass	Morone saxatilis		Lives in both freshwater and saltwater. Usually Striped bass can grow up to 6 ft 6 inches or more. They can also weigh in at 125 lbs and usually the females are bigger than the males. They Live in rivers, lakes, reservoirs, Atlantic coast, Gulf of Mexico and Pacific Coast of North America. Striped bass are opportunistic predators and feed on plankton, insects, crustaceans, small fishes, eels, shrimps, and worms.	LC	Found in Atlantic and Gulf Slope drainages. Widely introduced, it is also present in Pacific drainages.
	Osmeridae (family)				
Rainbow smelt	Osmerus mordax		An invasive species. Rainbow smelt are anadromous and move from saltwater to freshwater streams to spawn. They can live completely in freshwater and habit rivers, streams, lakes, and reservoirs. They are invasive because they eat larva of other species and species food resources but not only that fish species eggs. They are known to negatively impact ecosystems and can grow to 7 to 9 inches. They were introduced into horsetooth reservoirs but the condition of their population decreased. Not knowing if they survived or not due to the water temperature.	LC	Introduced into many different river systems. Present in the Pacific and Atlantic drainages of the US.
	Percidae (family)				
Arkansas darter	Etheostoma cragini		Lives in shallow creeks with sand bottoms. They feed on various sorts of aquatic insects and some plants that include small seed. They only have been recorded to grow up to 2.5 inches. Their maximum age is three years and are declining in population in Arkansas but are more dominated in population in the state Missouri.	NT	Present in the Arkansas River drainage system.
Iowa darter	Etheostoma exile		Has slender body shape and very short snout. Males are known to have blue blotches during breeding times. They are native in Colorado and mainly only found in the South Platte River. They are usually 1.5-2.5 inches long but some can get up to 3 inches. Darters are found in natural lakes and very sluggish streams or marshes with moderate aquatic vegetation and clear waters. They feed on insect larvae, crustaceans, and other aquatic invertebrates.	LC	Found in the St. Lawrence, Great Lakes, Hudson Bay, and Mississippi River systems.
Johnny darter	Etheostoma nigrum		Among the first fishes to move to new locations and recolonize those locations. Another name for them is Etheostoma nigrum, prefer to live in water that is clean and sandy gravel bottom of still slow moving water. They mainly eat water fleas, midge larvae, mayfly larvae, caddisfly larvae. They usually grow up to 2.5 inches for males and females 2.3 inches. They can live up to 3 years.	LC	Found in the St. Lawrence, Great Lakes, Hudson Bay, and Mississippi River basins. Drainages include the Colorado, Arkansas, Tennessee, and Cumberland river drainages.
Orangethroat darter	Etheostoma spectabile		A Tier 1 species and one of the greatest conservation needs. They are restricted to streams and feed on bottom for macroinvertebrates like insects, isopods, and amphipods. They do sometimes eat fish eggs. They can grow up to 3 inches and females patterned are the same as male but with colors that are muted brown.	LC	Found in the Lake Erie and Mississippi River basins. Drainages include many of the Gulf slope drainages
Logperch	Percina caprodes		Hard to find and very rare in Colorado. They live in shallow water of rivers and creeks but can be found in large rivers, lakes and reservoirs. They prefer fast moving water with sand and gravel bottoms. They like to lay their eggs in the sand of lakes and streams. They prefer to eat non-insect arthropods but also eat eggs, insects, mollusks, terrestrial worms, marine worms, and aquatic crustaceans. They can grow up to 13 to 18 cm and can live up to 4 years.	LC	Found in the St. Lawrence, Hudson Bay, Mississippi, and Great Lakes river basins. Drainages include the Hudson Bay drainage.
Yellow perch	Perca flavescens		Found in ponds, lakes, slow moving rivers, and creeks. Yellow Perch prefer clear water closest to vegetation and tend to school together near shore. Yellow perch diet consists of a wider variety of invertebrates and smaller fish. Yellow Perch can grow up to 19.7 inches and can live up to 11 years or more.	LC	Found in the Atlantic, Arctic, Great Lakes, and Mississippi River basins.
Sauger	Sander canadense		Found in rivers and large lakes and prefer moderate to fast currents. They like water close to 19.6 °C and are closely related to walleyes. Their diet consists of insects, aquatic crustaceans, zooplankton, but when they get bigger they mainly eat fish. Female saugers can lay up to 50,000 eggs and they can live up to 13 years. They can grow up to 25 inches, maybe more.	LC	Found in the St. Lawrence, Great Lakes, Mississippi, and Hudson Bay basins. Introduced in drainage systems across the US.
Walleye	Sander viterus		A commonly stocked game fish. The walleye mouth has large, sharp teeth. The Walleye like cold, deep, quieter water in rivers, lakes, and reservoirs. Walleye are mostly nocturnal and prefer to hide in tree roots, logs and aquatic plants during the day time. Since they are mostly nocturnal, they hunt more during the night which their diet depends on small fish, large invertebrates and insects. They will hunt in the day, too, but prefer nights. Walleyes can get as big as 3 feet and weigh as much as 20 pounds.	LC	Found in St. Lawrence, Great Lakes, Mississippi, and Arctic river basins. Drainages include both the Pacific and Atlantic drainages of the US.
Bigscale logperch	Percina macrolepida		Not native to Colorado and hard to find in Colorado. Found in large rivers or lakes but can be found in small streams. They can grow up to 95mm and are opportunistic feeders and consume a variety of benthic invertebrates. They lack a swim bladder so spend lots of time in small streams or lake bottom.	LC	Found primarily in the Rio Grande drainage system.
	Poecilidae (family)				
Western mosquitofish	Gambusia affinis		Has been introduced throughout the U.S. and the world because it eats mosquitoes. Diet consists of macro invertebrates, eggs of fish and amphibians, algae, and other small fishes. Western Mosquitofish can grow up to 7 cm but can create a large impact on ecosystems in good and bad ways.	LC	Widespread species, has been introduced into most river systems of the US.
	Salmonidae (family)				
Snake River cutthroat trout	Oncorhynchus clarki behnkei		Introduced as a sport fish in drainages other than the Snake River. They inhabit large rivers, small streams, lakes, and reservoirs but prefer good overhead or instream cover to hide from predators and to attack prey. Their diet consists of aquatic insects and plankton. They can also reach up to 12 inches in length and start eating smaller fish and crayfish.	NE	Likely to currently exist in small populations in the Rio Grande system.
Colorado River cutthroat trout	Oncorhynchus clarki pleuriticus		Considered one of the more beautiful trout in North America for its red coloration from the bottom mouth to the abdomen. These trout are found in high-country lakes and stream in the cool mountains. The native subspecies that feed on aquatic and terrestrial insects can grow up to 12 inches.	NE	Found in the upper Colorado River basin.
Greenback cutthroat trout	Oncorhynchus clarki stomias		An endangered species that is in the process of recovery of its population. Greenback cutthroat trout diet consists of aquatic and terrestrial invertebrates but they are also known to be opportunistic feeders. They eat what they can find. They live in rivers and lakes and it's actually very rare to find a greenback cutthroat trout 10 inches in length.	NE	Found in the Upper South Platte and Arkansas river drainages.
Rio Grande cutthroat trout	Oncorhynchus clarki virginalis		Found in high elevation streams and lakes. Rio Grande Cutthroat trout are generalist feeders and eat aquatic, terrestrial insects including other smaller fish. Due to the size of the river they can only get to a length of 10 to 12 inches.	NE	Found in the upper Rio Grande and Pecos drainage systems
Rainbow trout	Oncorhynchus mykiss		Eat aquatic insects, grasshoppers, worms, salamanders, crayfish and other fish. The difference is that Rainbow trout will go search for food if there is no food in it area. They live in rivers, streams, lakes, and reservoirs and usually grow much faster than other trout. Rainbow trout can live up to 11 years and grow up to 16 inches or more.	NE	Widely introduced, and established in the Arctic, Atlantic, Great Lakes, Mississippi, and Rio Grande basins.
Golden trout	Oncorhynchus mykiss aguabonita		Small members of the trout family. They occupy high altitude lakes and rivers from ranges of 9000 to 12000 feet in low temperature. They feed on small insects, larvae, aquatic insects, and small crustaceans. The biggest golden trout caught was 28 inches and 11.25 lbs.	NE	Found in the upper Kern river system.
Sockeye salmon	Oncorhynchus nerka		An anadromous species, meaning they hatch in freshwater streams, rivers or lakes and migrate to the ocean to feed and grow. Then when breeding season comes they return to their mating ground in freshwater where they were born to lay eggs. While in fresh water they eat insects, zooplankton, and amphipods. In the ocean they eat zooplankton, small larval, small fishes, and squid. They can grow up to 1.5 to 2.5 feet in length and weight up to 4 to 15 pounds before coming back to their spawning ground.	LC	Found in many drainages contained within the Pacific and Arctic river basins.
Mountain whitefish	Prosopium williamsoni		Found in western North America in lakes, rivers, and streams in the Rocky Mountain region. They live in the lower regions of Colorado where it is not as cold. They are known for small mouths so they eat small insects and crustaceans. They are important for trout because trout rely on their youngling and egg to get ready for the winter season. The population is important because it could affect the trout population.	NE	Found in Arctic, Pacific, Atlantic, and Missouri River basins.
Arctic char	Salvelinus alpinus		Introduced to Dillon Reservoir. Can be anadromous. They can live in the ocean but spawn in freshwater streams or remain landlocked and remain in fresh water for the rest of their life. Their color changes on the condition of the environment and water. Char diet varies with season as they can eat aquatic insects to salmon eggs, snails, small crustaceans, and fish during the spring and summer seasons. In the fall and winter season they change their diet and begin eating zooplankton, freshwater shrimp, and small fishes. They can weigh up to 20 pounds and grow more than 30 inches.	LC	Circumpolar. Found in the Atlantic, Pacific, and Arctic drainage systems.
Brook trout	Salvelinus fontinalis		Native to headwater and small streams in northeastern and southeastern Minnesota but have been introduced to Colorado lakes and rivers. Brook trout preferred habitats are sand gravel bottom with vegetation. They like living in headwater in ponds and rivers but also can be found in lakes. The brook trout eat small insects and other aquatic insects but as they get bigger that start to feed on minnows and other small fishes. They can grow up to 6 to 10 inches in small streams, rivers, and lakes. Some in lakes can get to as big as 24 inches.	NE	Found in the Atlantic, Great Lakes, and Mississippi River basins.
Lake trout	Salvelinus namaycush		Live in deep parts of the lakes. They rarely live in brackish water and also in some rivers and streams. Lake trout feed on a variety of organisms like crustaceans, insects, fishes, and small animals. Some can feed on plankton throughout its whole life but it will grow slow and be smaller in size. Lake trout can grow up to 59 inches and can live up to 40 years and maybe more.	NE	Present in Atlantic, Arctic, and Pacific basins.
Splake	Salvelinus namaycush × S.fontinalis		A hybrid between Salvelinus namaycush (lake trout) and Salvelinus fontinalis (brook trout). Splake were introduced by the Ministry of Natural Resources and do well in small bodies of water that remain cool throughout the year. They are raised in hatchery where brook trout sperm is used to fertilize lake trout eggs. The diet of Splake is the same as a brook trout eating plankton, insects, crayfish and small fish. They grow up to 20 inches and more quickly than their parent species. Splakes are able to live as long as 20 years. The second generation of Splake offspring have a harder time living and higher mortality rates.	NE	Hybrid, occurs where lake trout and brook trout interbreed.
Brown trout	Salmo trutta		Not native to North America. They were introduced to North America and live in lakes and rivers. Brown trout grow fast until they reach maturity and grow as long as 25 inches and weight in as much as 16 lbs. They are usually smaller in rivers than in lakes. Brown trout are active feeders and will feed on insects, zooplankton, worms, crayfish, small slams, snails, small fish like trout, minnows, young mink, and turtles. Brown trout will not die after spawn and will spawn multiple years in the same area.	LC	Native to Europe, but stocked in many river systems of the US.
Arctic grayling	Thymallus arcticus	Arctic Grayling	Known to swim 60 miles in between habitats. Arctic graylings like to live in habitats that are clear, cold, open water, and high concentrations of oxygen like rivers and lakes. Arctic grayling feed on zooplankton, insects, fish, fish eggs, lemmings, planktonic crustaceans. They can grow up to 13.5 inches and weigh 8.4 lbs. The oldest Arctic grayling was 18 years old.	LC	Found in the Arctic, Pacific, and Hudson Bay basins. Drainages include the Missouri River drainage.
	Sciaenidae (family)				
Freshwater drum	Aplodinotus grunniens		Live in medium to large rivers and reservoirs in deep water or open water. They can grow up to 20 inches or more and weigh up to 38 lbs. Freshwater drums are bottom feeder as well as carnivore and eat small fish, crayfish, aquatic insects, clams, and snails. They have strong molar teeth in its throat to crush the shell of snail and clams. Their call drum because they can produce a noise or sound with the rapid contraction of their abdominal muscles against their air bladder. This usually occurs during mating season.	LC	Found in the St. Lawrence, Great Lakes, Hudson Bay, and Mississippi River basins. Drainages include many of the Gulf Slope drainages.

== See also ==
- List of U.S. state fish
- Bibliography of Colorado
- Geography of Colorado
- History of Colorado
- Index of Colorado-related articles
- List of Colorado-related lists
- Outline of Colorado
