= Colorado ice fishing =

Fishing in Colorado has brought in a large amount of revenue for the state. In 2019 Colorado Parks and Wildlife estimated outdoor recreation contributed roughly 62 billion dollars to the state economy. Fishing was reported to be the 5th most popular outdoor activity and 110, 511 fishing and hunting combination licenses were sold. Ice fishing makes up part of this total fishing revenue and is a common annual sport for Colorado residents and out-of-state visitors. There is no legal definition of ice fishing season. Rather, people begin to ice fish once the lakes freeze over with thick enough ice (CPW recommends ice being at least 4 inches thick). Colorado Parks and Wildlife also recommend that people always ice-fish with another person. Typically, this starts in December and ends in April for Colorado. Lakes size, depth, elevation, and seasonal weather can cause variance to the season. Once the lakes freeze over with thick enough ice, anglers go out onto the ice, drill holes through the ice, and fish for a variety of species.

== Colorado rules and regulations ==
Before Colorado ice anglers can start fishing they need to obtain their fishing license for that year and become familiar with the regulations. Currently the rules specific for ice fishing in Colorado are:

- Ice holes not exceeding 10 inches in diameter
- Fires must be enclosed
- No littering
- Temporary ice structures must be removed before nightfall
- Permanent ice structures must have name and CID number of owner displayed.

Other regulation outlined by fishing and location based rules can be unique. The cost are subject to change but currently the annual resident cost is $35.17 and non-resident annual cost is $97.97. One day resident license is $13.90 and non-resident is $16.94.

The amount of fish caught are regulated by the State of Colorado too. The daily creel limits are as follows:

- Trout: 4
- Arctic char: 4
- Salmon: 4
- Brook trout: 10
- Kokanee salmon: 10
- Walleye: 5
- Saugeye: 5
- Sauger: 5
- Largemouth bass: 5
- Smallmouth bass: 5
- Largemouth bass (west of continental divide): unlimited
- Smallmouth bass (west of continental divide): unlimited
- White bass: 10
- Striped bass:10
- Striper: 10
- Channel catfish: 10
- Flathead catfish: 10
- Blue catfish: 10
- White crappie: 20
- Black crappie: 20
- Bluegill: 20
- Green sunfish: 20
- Pumpkinseed sunfish: 20
- Yellow perch: 20
- Yellow perch (west of continental divide): unlimited
- Tiger muskellunge: 1
- Northern pike: unlimited
- Whitefish: unlimited
- Sculpin: unlimited
- Sculpin (west of continental divide): 20

There are at-risk and endangered fish that anglers are urged to put back into the water as soon as possible by the state of Colorado.

- Arkansas darter, Etheostoma cragini
- Bonytail chub, Gila elegans
- Brassy minnow, Hybognathus hankinsoni
- Colorado pikeminnow, Ptychocheilus lucius
- Colorado River cutthroat trout, Oncorhynchus clarki pleuriticus
- Colorado roundtail chub, Gila robusta
- Common shiner, Luxilus cornutus
- Flathead chub, Platygobio gracilis
- Greenback cutthroat trout, Oncorhynchus clarki stomias
- Humpback chub, Gila cypha
- Iowa darter, Etheostoma exile
- Lake chub, Couesius plumbeus
- Mountain sucker, Catostomus playtrhynchus
- Northern redbelly dace, Phoxinus eos
- Plains minnow, Hybognathus placitus
- Plains orangethroat darter, Etheostoma spectabile
- Rio Grande chub, Gila pandora
- Rio Grande cutthroat trout, Oncorhynchus clarki virginalis
- Rio Grande sucker, Catostomus plebeius
- Razorback sucker, Xyrauchen texanus
- Southern redbelly dace, Phoxinus erythrogaster
- Stonecat, Noturus flavus
- Suckermouth minnow, Phenacobius mirabilis

== Ice fishing equipment ==
Often, anglers use an Auger (drill) to drill through the ice. There are a variety of augers that operate by gasoline, electric, or hand power. Ice shanty is another piece of equipment popular in ice fishing. These help protect anglers from the elements such as wind or precipitation. Commonly, anglers use a fishing rod to catch fish. These rods are often smaller than a standard fishing rods used by other types of fishing. This helps with the ability to use the ice hole and help anglers be less encumbered in an ice shanty. There is also no required casting because of the limited open water. Anglers also can use a tip-up device. This device has a trigger attached to the line which will raise up a flag that indicates when a fish has taken the bait. A variety of bait is put used with fishing poles and this is often at the discretion of the anger. There are some limitations that the state of Colorado has on bait that usually involve live bait. Oftentimes, lesser wax moth caterpillars and earthworm are popular in Colorado since trout with bite these. Although, there are lots of different worms, larvae, and lures that ice anglers can use based on their fish type, size, and location preferences. Crustaceans and mollusks are also popular ice fishing bait choices. Warm clothing is also common since the average temperatures in Colorado can become very cool during the winter months with the average low temperature at -8 °F and average high temperature at 25 °F for the month of January.

== Popular ice fishing lakes ==
There are many lakes in Colorado where anglers can go ice fishing. This is a list of popular lakes for the sport.

- Adobe Creek Reservoir
- Aurora Reservoir
- Blue Mesa Reservoir
- Bonny Reservoir
- Carter Lake
- Chatfield Reservoir
- Cherry Creek Reservoir
- Crystal Creek Reservoir
- Dillon Reservoir
- Echo Lake
- Eleven Mile Reservoir
- Evergreen Lake
- Grand Lake
- Green Mountain Reservoir
- Gross Reservoir
- Horsetooth Reservoir
- Lake Granby
- Lake Isabel
- Lake San Cristobal
- Lathrop State Park
- McPhee Reservoir
- Morrow Point Reservoir
- Navajo Lake
- Rampart Reservoir
- Ridgway Reservoir
- Rifle Gap Reservoir
- Ruedi Reservoir
- Shadow Mountain Lake
- Sloan lake
- Stagecoach Reservoir
- Standley Lake
- Taylor Park Reservoir
- Vallecito Reservoir
- Walden Reservoir
- Williams Fork Reservoir
- Wolford Mountain Reservoir

In addition to these lakes which are typically larger, there are many other smaller and lesser known lakes that anglers may fish at. It is recommended that if you decided to explore lakes in the wilderness you are experienced with snow and mountain safety.

== Winter behavior and anatomical changes ==
The fish environment is different during the winter months compared to the summer months. The layer of ice on the lake affects the dissolved oxygen, hydrogen sulfide, free carbon dioxide, and temperature depending on the water depth. Often, there will be more dissolved oxygen near the surface of the lake. The temperature usually is warmer towards the bottom of a lake. There is evidence that the longest lived Northern pike, yellow perch, and bluegill stayed near the surface of the lake.

Commonly small sized fish survive just as well in the winter as larger fish. This is dependent on predation and food sources of the lake. If food source is exhausted, smaller fish tend to die first. Different types of predation will affect fish survival. Size-selective predation often results in smaller fish being preyed upon more. One study shows that with predation, mortality rates are 20% higher. Although, on average smaller fish grew more in length compared to larger sized fish in the same species during the winter.

Different types of fish also feed less during the winter. Warm-water fish such as pike tend to have lower activity during the winter. This activity included movement and feeding making a catch rarer. Some fish all together will not feed for multiple weeks and rely on their fat stores. Cold-water fish such as many in the carp family can be very active during the winter months. Trout, perch, bluegill and crappie all feed throughout most of the winter and are popular catches for ice anglers. Temperatures tend to have less variability throughout the lake during the winter months and tend to be within 2 - 3 degrees Celsius. This often results in reduced lake habitat diversity. Fish will conjugate near warm water inlets during the winter months. This poses a risk for fishermen since there is a higher risk of weak ice. Although, with higher activity and density of fishes, anglers can sometimes be more successful catching fish.

"Winterkill" may kill a large amount of fish when a lake experiences especially harsh winter weather. This is due to the water lacking in oxygen and associated more commonly with severe winters. Small and shallow lakes are especially at risk for "winterkill". This is often due to vegetation in the water not receiving enough sunlight to undergo photosynthesis and produce oxygen. It may also be affected by relative hydrogeology and fall climate. Bacteria, fish, and vegetation use up all the oxygen of a lake which results in the fish death. Different fish are affected differently by low oxygen levels. Trout are the most vulnerable to low oxygen levels. Walleye, yellow perch, northern pike, carp and crappie can live in water with oxygen levels at 2 ppm.

== Ice fishing sport fishes in Colorado ==
A variety of fishes can be fished for during ice fishing. These include

- Arctic grayling, Thymallus arcticus
- Black crappie, Pomoxis nigromaculatus
- Bluegill, Lepomis macrochirus
- Brook trout, Salvelinus fontinalis
- Brown trout, Salmo trutta
- Channel catfish, Ictalurus punctatus
- Colorado River cutthroat trout, Oncorhynchus clarki pleuriticus
- Flathead catfish, Pylodictus olivaris
- Golden trout, Oncorhynchus mykiss aguabonita
- Green sunfish, Lepomis cyanellus
- Greenback cutthroat trout, Oncorhynchus clarki stomias
- Kokanee salmon, Oncorhynchus nerka
- Lake trout, Salvelinus namaycush
- Largemouth bass, Micropterus salmoides
- Mountain whitefish, Prosopium williamsoni
- Northern pike, Esox lucius
- Rainbow trout, Oncorhynchus mykiss
- Rio Grande cutthroat trout, Oncorhynchus clarki virginalis
- Sauger, Sander canadense
- Smallmouth bass, Micropterus dolomieu
- Splake, Salvelinus namaycush × S. fontinalis
- striped bass, Morone saxatilis
- Tiger muskellunge (hybrid) E. lucius × E. masquinongy
- Walleye, Sander vitreus
- White crappie, Pomoxis annularis
- Wiper, M. chrysops × M. saxatilis
- Yellow perch, Perca flavescens

These are common sport fishes but there are many different types of Colorado fish that anglers may catch either intentionally or unintentionally.
