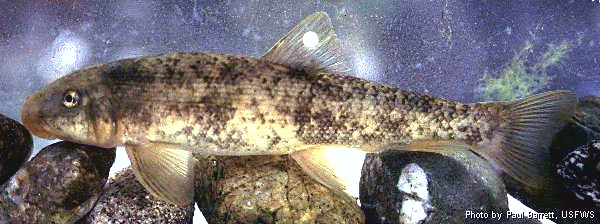

Conservation status
- Endangered (IUCN 3.1)

- Threatened (ESA)

Scientific classification
- Kingdom: Animalia
- Phylum: Chordata
- Class: Actinopterygii
- Order: Cypriniformes
- Family: Catostomidae
- Genus: Pantosteus
- Species: P. santaanae

Binomial name
- Pantosteus santaanae Snyder, 1908

Synonyms
- Catostomus santaanae (Snyder, 1908)

= Santa Ana sucker =

Species of fish

The Santa Ana sucker (Pantosteus santaanae) is a freshwater ray-finned fish, endemic to California. It is closely related to the mountain sucker and has dark grey upper parts and silvery underparts. It grows to a maximum length of 25 cm (10 in), but most adults are much smaller than this. It feeds on algae, diatoms and detritus on the floor of shallow streams with sand, gravel or cobble bottoms. It is found in only a few streams in southern California, and many of these in the Greater Los Angeles metropolitan area have been restricted to concrete channels. Because of its small area of occupancy and vulnerability, the International Union for Conservation of Nature has rated this fish as "endangered".

Often placed in the genus Catostomus, it is now placed in the genus Pantosteus, in which it was originally described. It is the only member of the genus found west of the Pacific Coast Ranges.

== Description ==
The Santa Ana sucker is closely related to the mountain sucker, and quite similar in appearance. Color is dark grey above and silvery-white below; the sides have a faint pattern of darker blotches and stripes. There are distinct notches where the upper and lower lips meet, and the lower lip is narrower in the middle, with only 3 or 4 rows of papillae at that point. The dorsal fins have 9 to 11 rays, while the pelvic fins have 8 to 10 rays. These suckers do have an anatomy variation by sex where females have tubercles on caudal peduncle and anal fin while males develop additional tubercles on lower half of caudal peduncle, anal, and caudal fins in the breeding season. The caudal peduncle is somewhat longish. In contrast to the mountain sucker, the membrane between the rays of the tail fin is pigmented. Length has been recorded up to 25 cm (9.8 in), but less than 16 cm (6.3 in) is more typical.

Also like the mountain sucker, it feeds on diatoms, other kinds of algae, and detritus, which it obtains by scraping surfaces such as rocks. It also eats the occasional insect larva, with larger fish observed to consume insects more frequently.

The breading habits of Santa Ana Suckers do not differ from other species of suckers as the female fish are attended by at least 2 male fishes during mating seasons. A female sucker can release between 4,000 and 16,000 eggs amongst her gradual breeding process.

Their living patterns consist of being a nonmigrant species that are short-lived with around 4 years of time, on average.

== Habitat ==
Santa Ana suckers live in small to medium size streams throughout the year in Southern California. They notably thrive in freshwater conditions. The depths go from a few centimeters to over 1 metre (3 ft 3 in). The rivers they swim in are at cool temperatures (average of less than 22 °C or 72 °F), with variable flow as the suckers are well adapted to survive in the most intense flood conditions. Not surprisingly, given their feeding method, they prefer gravel, rubble, and boulder substrates.

== Range ==
The Pantosteus santaanae range is extremely restricted; they are native only to the Los Angeles, San Gabriel, Santa Ana, and Santa Clara River systems in Southern California. Populations have been lost from several parts of the rivers, so that they now only live in Big Tujunga Creek in the Los Angeles River Basin, the headwaters of the San Gabriel River in the San Gabriel Mountains in Angeles National Forest in Los Angeles County, parts of the Santa Clara River system in Los Angeles and Ventura counties, and the lower part of the Santa Ana River in Orange County, especially areas with additional water effluent from sewage treatment plants. A substantial fish population can also be found in a research-monitored project in Los Angeles County of Haines Creek.

== Conservation ==
Since Santa Ana suckers were first listed as a federally threatened species (effective May 2000), the Santa Ana Watershed Project Authority has been actively working towards conservation efforts through direct administrative action and educational opportunities for the public to become aware of. Watershed conservation efforts are key in saving these suckers as their biggest threat posed is of habitat loss where it is recorded that they currently have lost over 95% of their natural habitat.

Although some stretches of the rivers are 'wild' and protected by being within the Angeles National Forest area of the San Gabriel Mountains, the coincidence of this fish's range and the Greater Los Angeles metropolitan area, and flowing in concrete lined flood control channels, means that it is a species vulnerable to extinction. The International Union for Conservation of Nature has rated this fish as an "endangered species" because of its decreasing area of occupancy and declining population.

In 2005, the U.S. Fish and Wildlife Service eliminated critical habitat in Orange, Riverside, and San Bernardino counties. 8,305 acres of critical habitat was kept along the San Gabriel River and Big Tujunga Creek, down from more than 20,000 acres.

In 2010, the U.S. Fish and Wildlife Service issued an expanded critical habitat determination for the Santa Ana sucker, which came into effect on January 13, 2011.
