= Pantosteus jarrovii =

Conservation status
- Critically Imperiled (NatureServe)

- Endangered (ESA)

Scientific classification
- Kingdom: Animalia
- Phylum: Chordata
- Class: Actinopterygii
- Division: Teleostei
- Order: Cypriniformes
- Family: Catostomidae
- Genus: Pantosteus
- Species: P. jarrovii

Binomial name
- Pantosteus jarrovii (Cope, 1874)

Subspecies of fish

Pantosteus jarrovii, the Zuni bluehead sucker, is a species of fish only found in Arizona and New Mexico in the United States. Formerly placed in the genus Catostomus and as a subspecies of the related bluehead sucker (P. discolobus), it is now placed as its own species in the genus Pantosteus.

== Description ==
The Zuni bluehead sucker has a slender fusiform body with a subterminal mouth. The fish's mouth contains fleshy lips and protuberances, mainly on the lower lips. Both lips are notched laterally, and the middle separation of the lips extends all the way to the fish's anterior margin. The position of the lips is unique to this species. A Zuni bluehead sucker has a generally thick caudal peduncle. For coloration, young Zuni bluehead suckers are dark gray-green dorsally and cream-white ventrally; while adults are slate-gray, being almost black dorsally and cream-white ventrally. Males develop a distinct coloration during spawning season; instead of being slate-gray, they become intense black with a bright red lateral band. Most individuals are 200 mm (7.9 in) at most, although few were found at 250 mm (9.8 in).

== Range ==
The Zuni bluehead sucker can be found in East Central Arizona, and most recently found in four small streams in 1966. Several specimens were collected from East Clear Creek and from Kin Li Chee Creek, but populations decreased in the early 1980s. However, the presence of the Zuni bluehead suckers was confirmed in 1987 and 2000 when individuals were collected again for genetic evaluation.

The Zuni bluehead sucker is New Mexico's most endangered fish, as it is listed on the New Mexico Game and Fish's endangered species list. The Zuni Mountains area south of Grants, New Mexico, provides the only habitat for this species.

The New Mexico Department of Game and Fish is working collaboratively with several agencies to bring back the Zuni bluehead sucker from near extinction.

== Habitat ==
Zuni bluehead suckers are found in stream habitats with shade and substrates such as bedrock, boulders, and cobble. Pools are often edged by emergent aquatic vascular plants.

== Diet ==
Zuni bluehead suckers eat algae and invertebrates off of rocks with the cartilaginous scraper in their mouths.

== Reproduction ==
Zuni bluehead suckers spawn in April through late May, when water temperature reaches 10–15 °C (50–59 °F). Females are usually larger than males, and produce about 200-300 eggs (larger females can produce more than 450).

== Population trend ==
Due to poor watershed management, the populations of the Zuni bluehead sucker decreased 90% in the last 20 years. These fish are now only found in fragmented, somewhat isolated stretches of their historic range.
