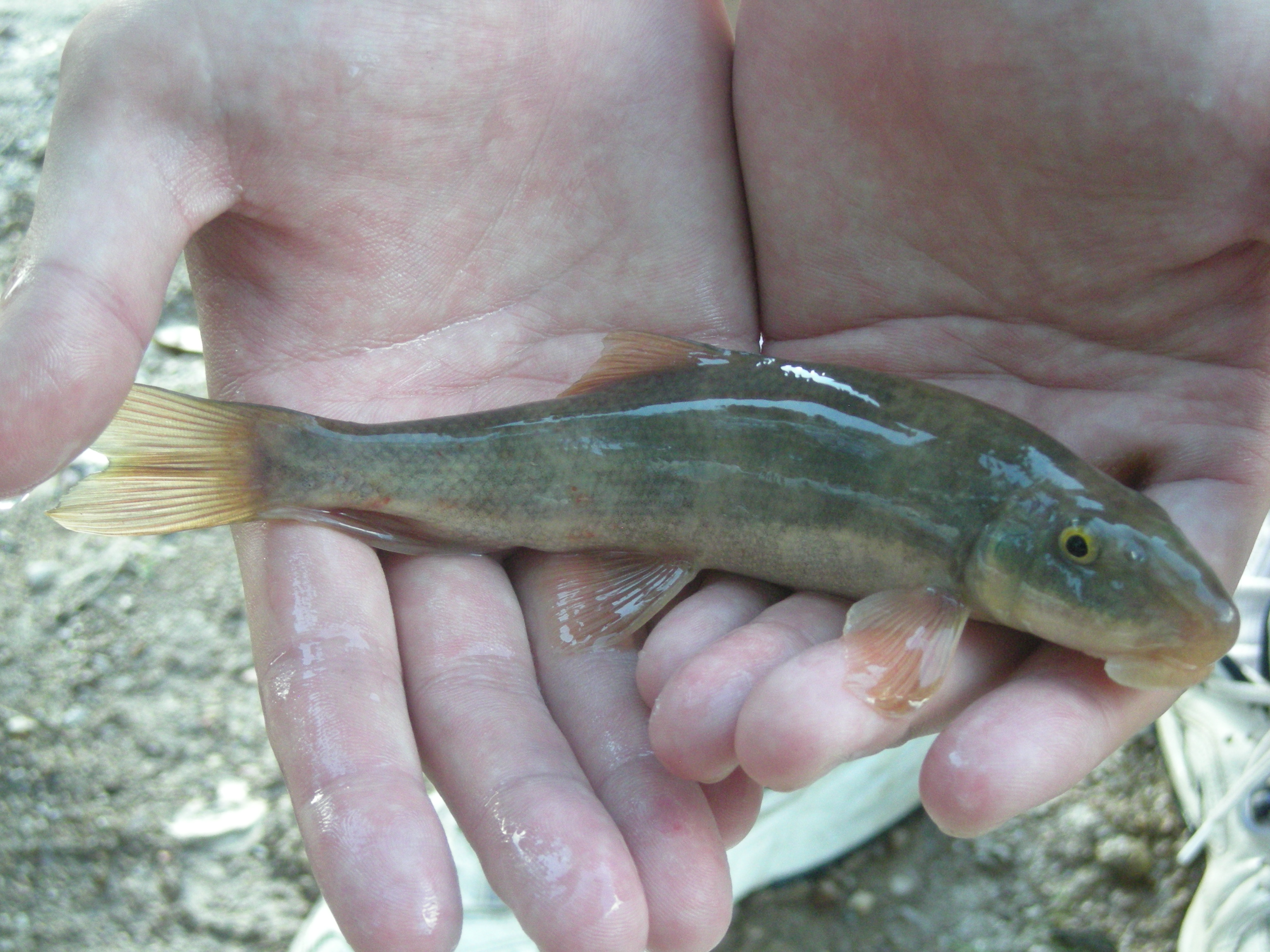
- Desert sucker (P. clarkii)

Scientific classification
- Kingdom: Animalia
- Phylum: Chordata
- Class: Actinopterygii
- Order: Cypriniformes
- Family: Catostomidae
- Subfamily: Catostominae
- Genus: Pantosteus; Cope, 1875

= Pantosteus =

Pantosteus Temporal range: Middle Miocene to present

Genus of fishes

Pantosteus, the mountain suckers, is a genus of North American freshwater ray-finned fish in the family Catostomidae. Long treated as a subgenus of Catostomus, phylogenetic evidence has found them to a form a monophyletic group that diverged from other members of Catostomus during the Miocene, and they are thus treated better as a distinct genus.

They are native to mountainous regions of western North America, from southern Canada to north-central Mexico. They are primarily found in the Interior West, where they are known from the Black Hills, Rocky Mountains,parts of the Sierra Madre Occidental, much of the Great Basin, and parts of the Cascade Range. However, a single isolated species (the Santa Ana sucker) is found west of the Cascades, in the San Gabriel Mountains.

Pantosteus species tend to be smaller than those in Catostomus. They inhabit cool, fast-flowing streams located in high-elevation environments.

== Taxonomy ==
The following species are placed in this genus:

- Pantosteus bondi (G. R. Smith, J. D. Stewart & N. E. Carpenter, 2013) (Cordilleran sucker)
- Pantosteus clarkii (Baird & Girard, 1854) (Desert sucker)
  - P. c. intermedius (Tanner, 1942) (White River desert sucker)
  - P. c. utahensis (Tanner, 1932) (Virgin River desert sucker)
  - P. c. "unnamed" (Meadow Valley Wash desert sucker)
- Pantosteus discobolus (Cope, 1871) (bluehead sucker)
- Pantosteus jarrovii (Cope, 1874) (Zuni bluehead sucker)
- Pantosteus jordani Evermann, 1893 (Plains sucker)
- Pantosteus lahontan Rutter, 1903 (Lahontan sucker)
- Pantosteus nebuliferus (Garman, 1881) (Nazas sucker)
- Pantosteus platyrhynchus (Cope, 1874) (Mountain sucker)
- Pantosteus plebeius (Baird & Girard, 1854) (Rio Grande sucker)
- Pantosteus santaanae Snyder, 1908 (Santa Ana sucker)
- Pantosteus virescens Cope, 1875 (Green sucker)

Catostomus columbianus was also previously placed in Pantosteus, and appears to have undergone some hybridization with Pantosteus in the past. However, treating it as a member of Pantosteus makes the genus Catostomus paraphyletic, and it thus continues to be treated as a member of Catostomus.

The following fossil species are also known:

- †Pantosteus asitus (Smith, Stewart & Carpenter, 2013) - Early Pliocene of Nevada, US (White Narrows Formation)
- †Pantosteus arenatus (Miller & Smith, 1967) - Late Pliocene of Idaho, US (Glenns Ferry Formation)
- †Pantosteus hyomyzon (Smith, Stewart & Carpenter, 2013) - Middle Miocene to Late Miocene of Oregon and Washington, US (Juntura Formation, Drewsey Formation and Ellensburg Formation)
- †Pantosteus oromyzon (Smith, Stewart & Carpenter, 2013) - Early Pliocene of Idaho, US (Glenns Ferry Formation)
