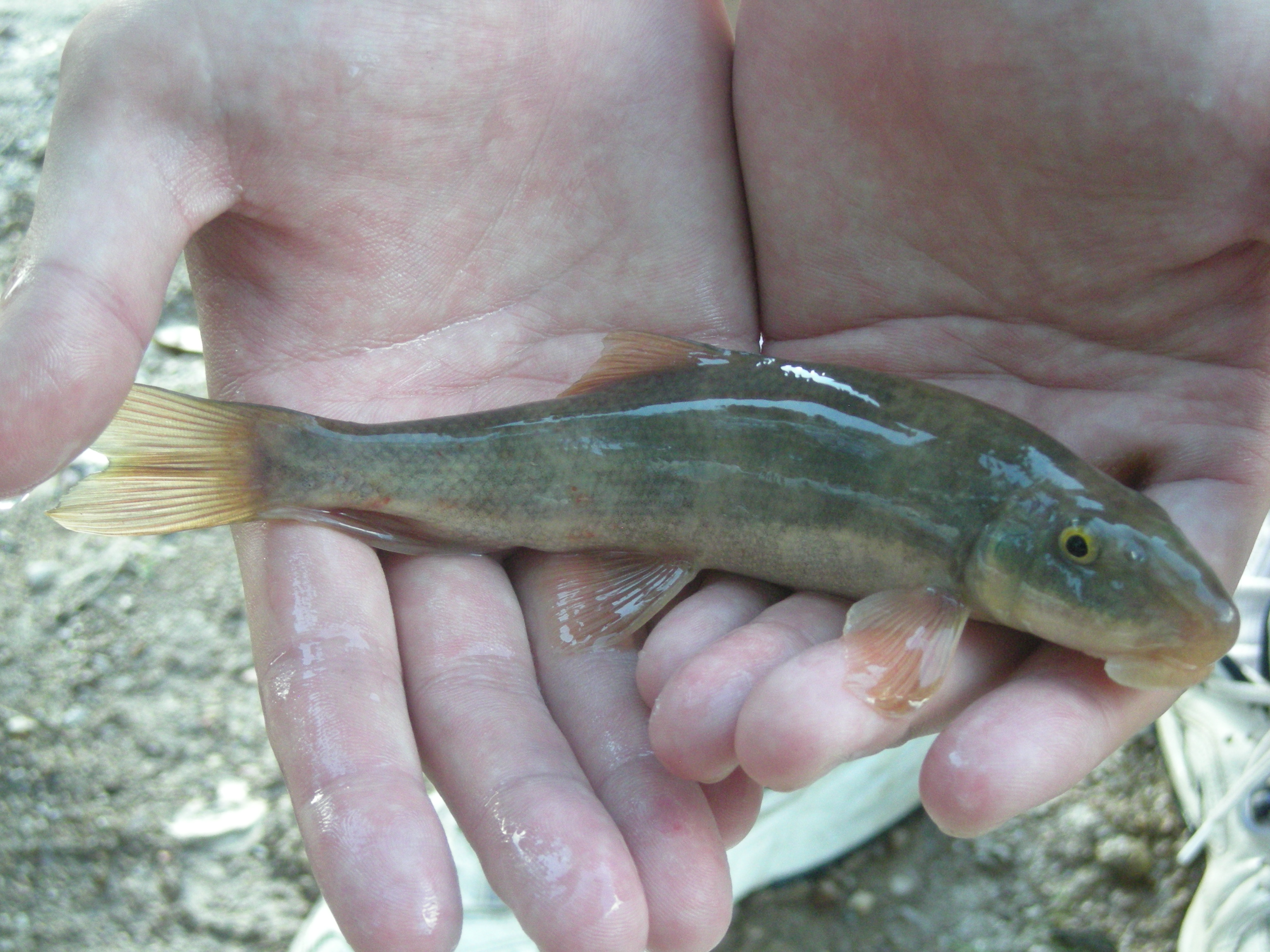

Conservation status
- Least Concern (IUCN 3.1)

- Vulnerable (NatureServe)

Scientific classification
- Kingdom: Animalia
- Phylum: Chordata
- Class: Actinopterygii
- Order: Cypriniformes
- Family: Catostomidae
- Genus: Pantosteus
- Species: P. clarkii

Binomial name
- Pantosteus clarkii (S. F. Baird & Girard, 1854)

Synonyms
- Catostomus clarkii Baird & Girard, 1854; Notolepidomyzon utahensis Tanner, 1932; Notolepidomyzon intermedius Tanner, 1942

= Desert sucker =

Species of fish

The desert sucker or Gila Mountain sucker (Pantosteus clarkii), is a freshwater species of ray-finned fish in the sucker family, endemic to the Great Basin and the Colorado River Basin in the United States. It inhabits rapids and fast-flowing streams with gravelly bottoms. It is a bi-colored fish with the upper parts olive brown to dark green, and the underparts silvery-tan or yellowish. The head is cylindrical, tapering to a thick-lipped mouth on the underside. This fish can grow to 31 in (79 cm) in Arizona but is generally only about half this size elsewhere. Formerly placed in the genus Catostomus, it is now placed in the genus Pantosteus.

== Description ==
Desert suckers are bicolored; the back and upper sides are darker, olive-brown to dark green, and the belly and lower sides are deep-yellow to silvery tan. The scales on the upper half of the body have dark spots which form faint dashed lines. Their head is cylindrical, tapering to a blunt face with the lower lip about three times as thick as upper lip. The mouth is on the underside (ventral) of the face and is proportionately large. The dorsal fin of the desert sucker has 10 to 11 rays. The adult lengths range from 4 to 16 inches (100 to 410 mm) in smaller streams, but up to 31 inches (790 mm) in Arizona. Their weight ranges from 4 to 65 ounces (110–1,840 g).

== Distribution ==
The desert sucker is found in Nevada, Utah, Arizona and New Mexico. The desert sucker occurs in the lower Colorado River basin, below the Grand Canyon, particularly in the Gila River, and above the Grand Canyon in streams in the Virgin River basin, the White River basin and others. The total range area of the desert sucker is estimated at 128,000 km^{2} (49,000 sq mi).

== Habitat ==
Desert suckers prefer ripply waters, rapids and flowing streams with gravelly bottoms.

== Reproduction ==
Desert suckers reach maturity in their second year. Spawning occurs in winter and spring from January through May.

== Subspecies ==
Three subspecies have been identified: the White River desert sucker, Catostomus clarkii intermedius (sometimes known as White River mountain sucker, Pantosteus intermedius), Virgin River desert sucker, Catostomus clarkii utahensis, and the Meadow Valley Wash desert sucker, Catostomus clarkii (unnamed).

Some ichthyologists regarded these as members of the genus Pantosteus, but later authors regard Pantosteus as a subgenus of Catostomus. There are suggestions of hybridization between Catostomus clarkii and Catostomus insignis.
