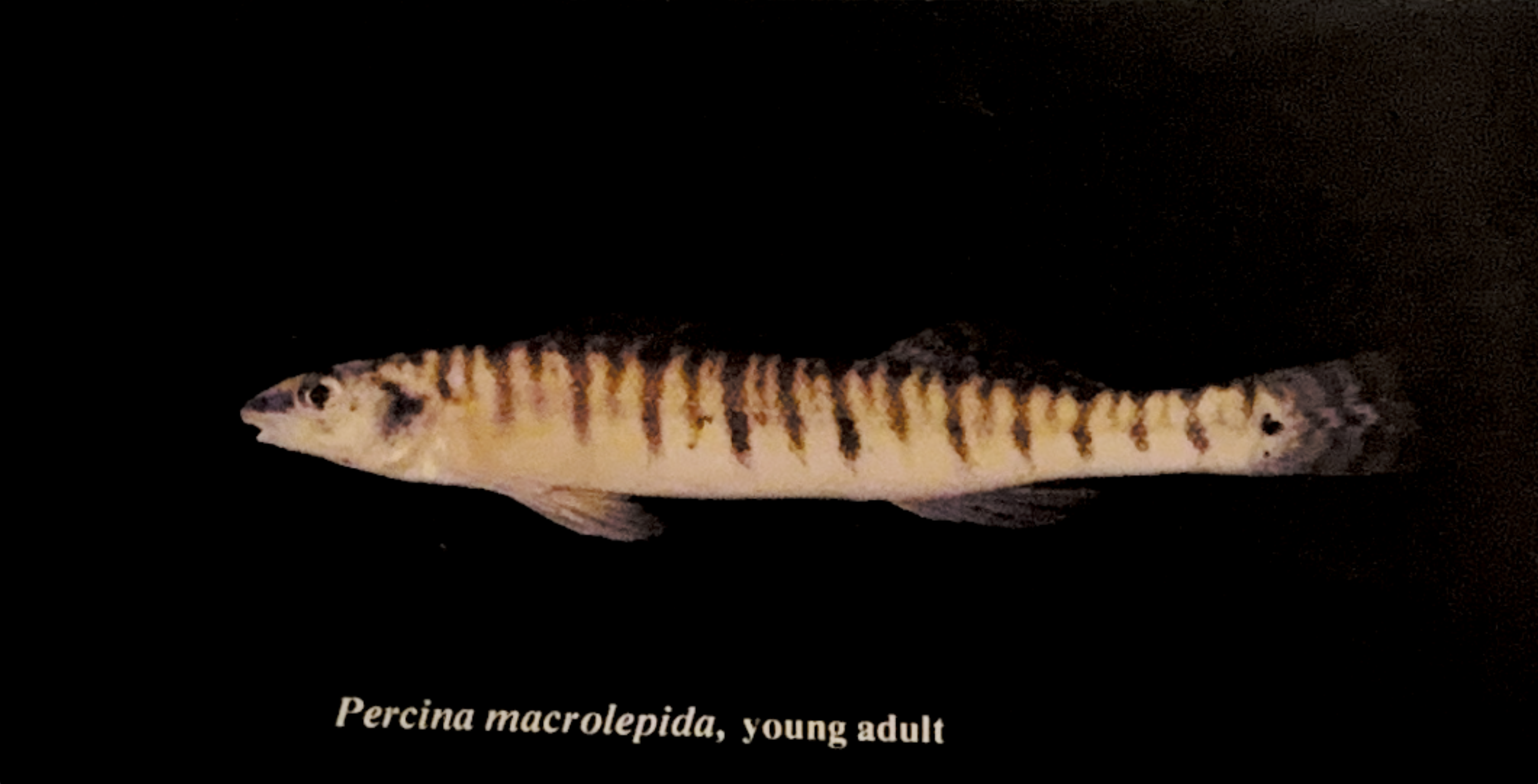

Conservation status
- Least Concern (IUCN 3.1)

Scientific classification
- Kingdom: Animalia
- Phylum: Chordata
- Class: Actinopterygii
- Order: Perciformes
- Family: Percidae
- Genus: Percina
- Species: P. macrolepida

Binomial name
- Percina macrolepida Stevenson, 1971

= Bigscale logperch =

Species of North American freshwater fish

The bigscale logperch (Percina macrolepida) is a rayfinned freshwater fish that is a member of the Percid family and Etheostomatini subfamily (the darters). It was discovered in 1971 by Michael Stevenson and was originally thought to be one with Percina caprodes. This fish is on average 85 mm, but the maximum recorded was 95 mm.

== Description ==
This fish is defined by scales on its nape and breast and a lack of yellow-orange band on the dorsal fin that defines P. caprodes. It generally has large-sized scales, less scales on its lateral line, a more fusiform shape, and a longer caudal peduncle than P. caprodes. This fish differs from other darters by a smaller head size and a unique pattern of lateral bars. This fish has about 20 vertical bars that extend from the dorsal area towards the middle of the lateral section. The central 5-8 bars are darker than the rest, and they continue down the body until reaching the caudal peduncle. P. macrolepida has ctenoid scales on its nape, cheeks, preopercle, and opercle, and both sexes have a scaled stomach. However, females have a mid-ventral line bare of scales, while males have scales on this area. This fish has a terminal mouth with well-developed teeth in multiple rows; the first row of teeth is curved backwards into the mouth. The terminal mouth is characteristic of the Percina genus and infers its ability to eat prey from sides of rocks. P. macrolepida’s vomer, the flat bone on the roof of its mouth, features small prickles.

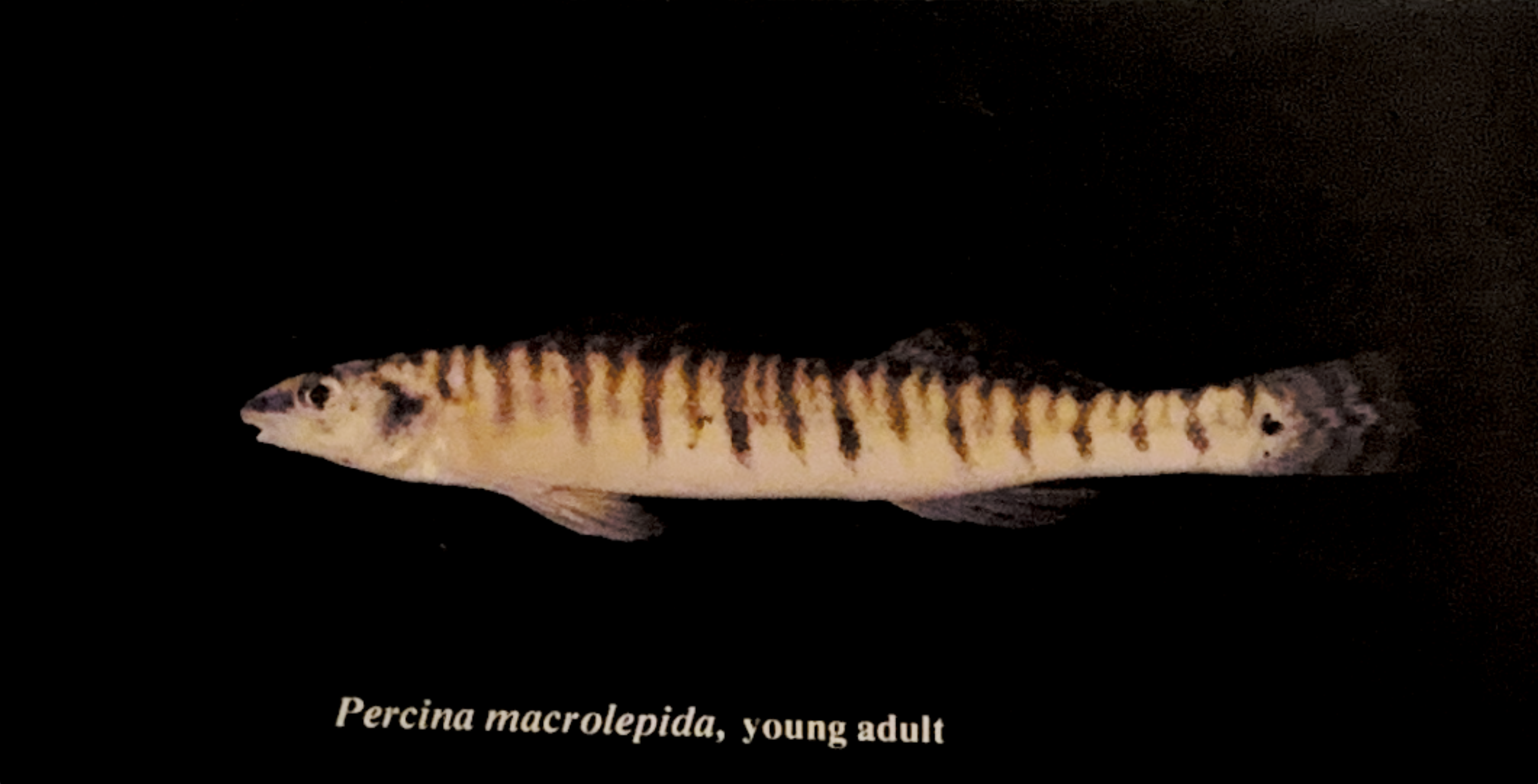
Percina macrolepida as a young adult; note the dark vertical bands and v-shaped marks on its caudal fin.

P. macrolepida are dull-colored and feature dark-colored vertical bars. In adults, the head is dark green while the cheeks and supraoccipital region are yellow-green, and the stomach is cream-colored. Adult caudal fins have V-shaped bars and a dark caudal spot the size of the fish’s pupil. Melanophores are scattered throughout the head, stomach, and pre-pectoral areas. The fish’s dorsal side is dark green and iridescent and its vertical bars are dark black. Reproducing adults have yellow areas around fin bases, opercle, lower lip, and stomach, while breeding males also have yellow-orange at the bases of the dorsal fins, first few dorsal spines, and the caudal fin.

P. macrolepida is a member of the Etheostomatini subfamily, the darters. Percina, one of the three genuses in Etheostomatini and the most primitive, is defined as having at least one large toothed scale between the pelvic fins, a lateral line that ends at the base of the caudal fin, and two spines on its anal fins. This genus is also unique because it has a lactate dehydrogenase (LDH) allele that is absent in other darter genuses.

Darters evolved for life in shallow turbulent waters, which resulted in P. macrolepida’s small size and lack of swim bladder. This fish and its subfamily members are diurnal feeders and use visual cues to find prey. Logperches, including P. macrolepida, have a blunt snout and flat head that is suited for finding prey by flipping over stones on the river floor. Logperches have undergone rapid allopatric speciation which occurred recently, as of the Pleistocene Epoch. The mechanism of logperch’s speciation is unknown, but this evidence suggests that this clade is diverse and may continue to radiate.

== Distribution ==
P. macrolepida are found in all major river systems in Texas, Sabine River in Louisiana, Pecos River in New Mexico, Red River in Oklahoma, and Rio San Carlos in Coahuila, Mexico. It has also been found in irrigation canals and Baker Lake in Colorado and Red River in Arkansas. This fish was introduced into California waters by the US Fish and Wildlife Service in 1954. They were accidentally mixed in a shipment of other fish and brought to Beale Air Force Base in Yuba County. They are currently found in the Sacramento-San Joaquin watershed, including Feather River, the Sacramento Delta, San Joaquin Valley, Putah Creek, and Cache Creek, as well as Del Valle Reservoir in Alameda County, Berryessa Reservoir in Napa County, and several reservoirs in Southern California. This extensive movement results from P. macrolepida being used as bait for other fish; it is frequently transported by fishermen to new locations. The fish is relatively abundant and is not endangered.

P. macrolepida are typically found in large freshwater rivers, lakes, and streams. It is also found in impounded waters like irrigation canals and ponds. This species is unique in that it tends to avoid turbulence in water. This fish is most common in warm, clear streams or shallow reservoirs and can also survive in irrigation canals.

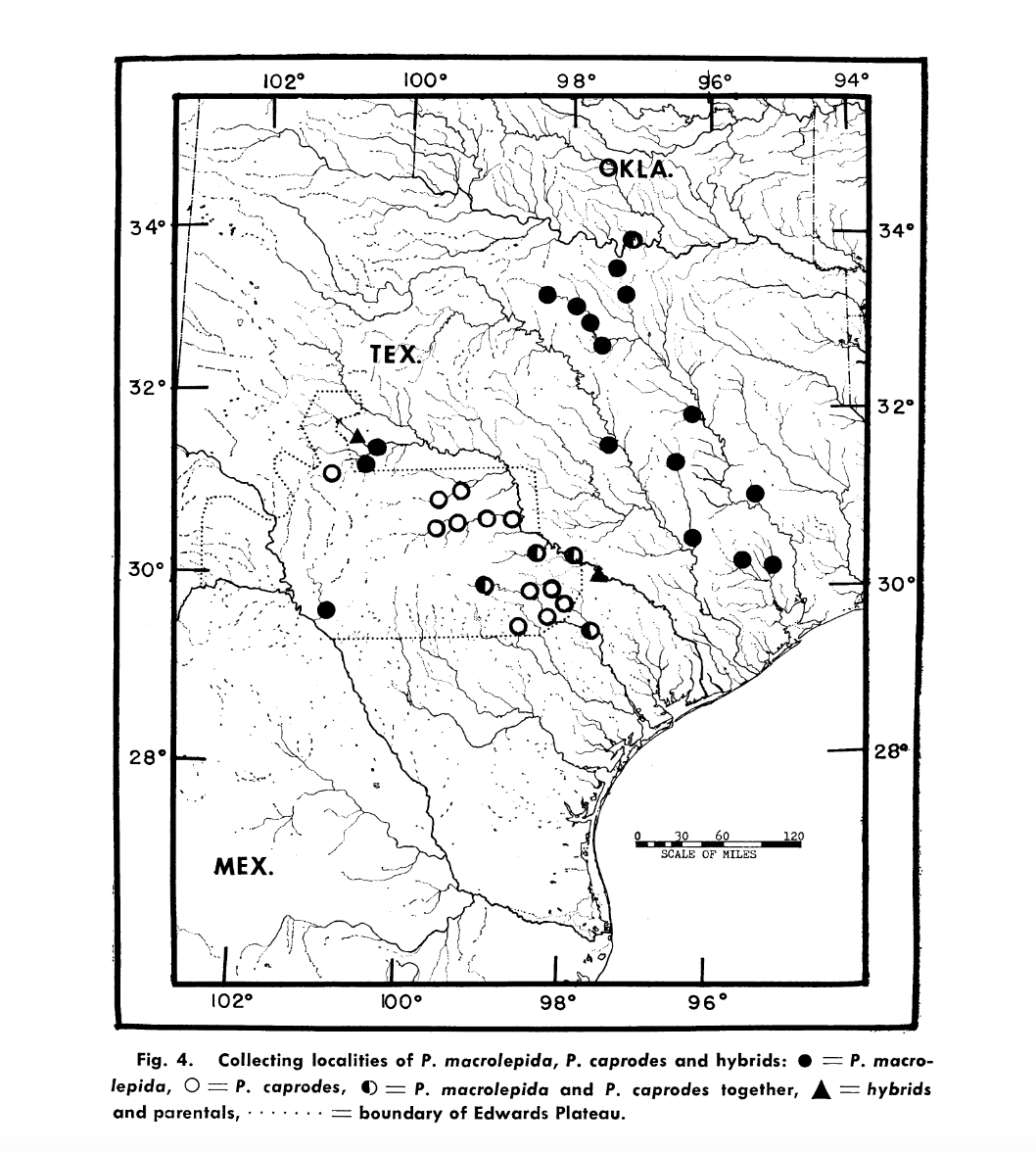
The range of P. macrolepida in Texas, shown in black circles.

== Life History ==
This fish spends its time motionless, only moving in short bursts or longer to find food. It digs pits in the substrate with its tail where it sits without moving.

It is an opportunistic feeder, meaning it eats what insects or invertebrates are most common in the environment. Juvenile darters eat small crustaceans like water fleas, plankton, and ostracods. Juveniles are obligate planktivores while their mouth develops, then eat larvae and invertebrates as adults. Adults eat midges, black flies, mayflies, and caddisflies.

One study found that juveniles prefer substrates of deep sand rather than shallow sand or gravel. It was theorized that the deep sand allowed juveniles to detect where areas are not as turbulent, which is better for feeding on invertebrates. Areas with less turbulence and waves tend to have more zooplankton than areas with more frequent waves. Adults did not prefer deep sand as consistently, largely being found in areas with less sand and more turbulence. This implies that adults prefer waves to dredge up larger prey to eat.

Members of Etheostomatini, which includes P. macrolepida, generally have a high larval mortality, constant death rate of adults, then high mortality as age increases.

Darters have 3 distinct types of ova: small white ova in early fall, intermediate yellow ova in winter, and large orange ova in spring, then spawn in spring. All members of the Percina genus spawn by burying eggs in substrate. The female will select where to lay eggs, then the male will mount and the ova and sperm are released together into the substrate.

The largest number of eggs laid by P. macrolepida was 365 at one time, which is a relatively small number compared to other darters. The reproductive estimate for this species is 186-365 eggs per year. This fish’s eggs are an average of 1.4 mm in diameter.

== Conservation Status ==
Darters (Etheostomatini), including P. macrolepida, have no economic importance to humans except as food for walleye.

According to the IUCN Redlist of threatened species, this species is of “Least Concern.” Its population is stable and has even increased with movement to the Arkansas river basin, California streams, and Colorado lakes. There are no major threats to this species other than localized predation. For instance, in New Mexico, juvenile smallmouth bass were found to have bigscale logperch in their intestinal tract, suggesting predation. Smallmouth bass are invasive in New Mexico, while bigscale logperch are native to that state. Bigscale logperch are protected by the state of New Mexico and it is advised to avoid knowingly stocking invasive predator species such as the smallmouth bass in the same water as native species. Additionally, some research suggests that round gobies outcompete logperch for habitat and might negatively impact the logperch’s population sizes. Wide-scale conservation efforts are not recommended at this time.
