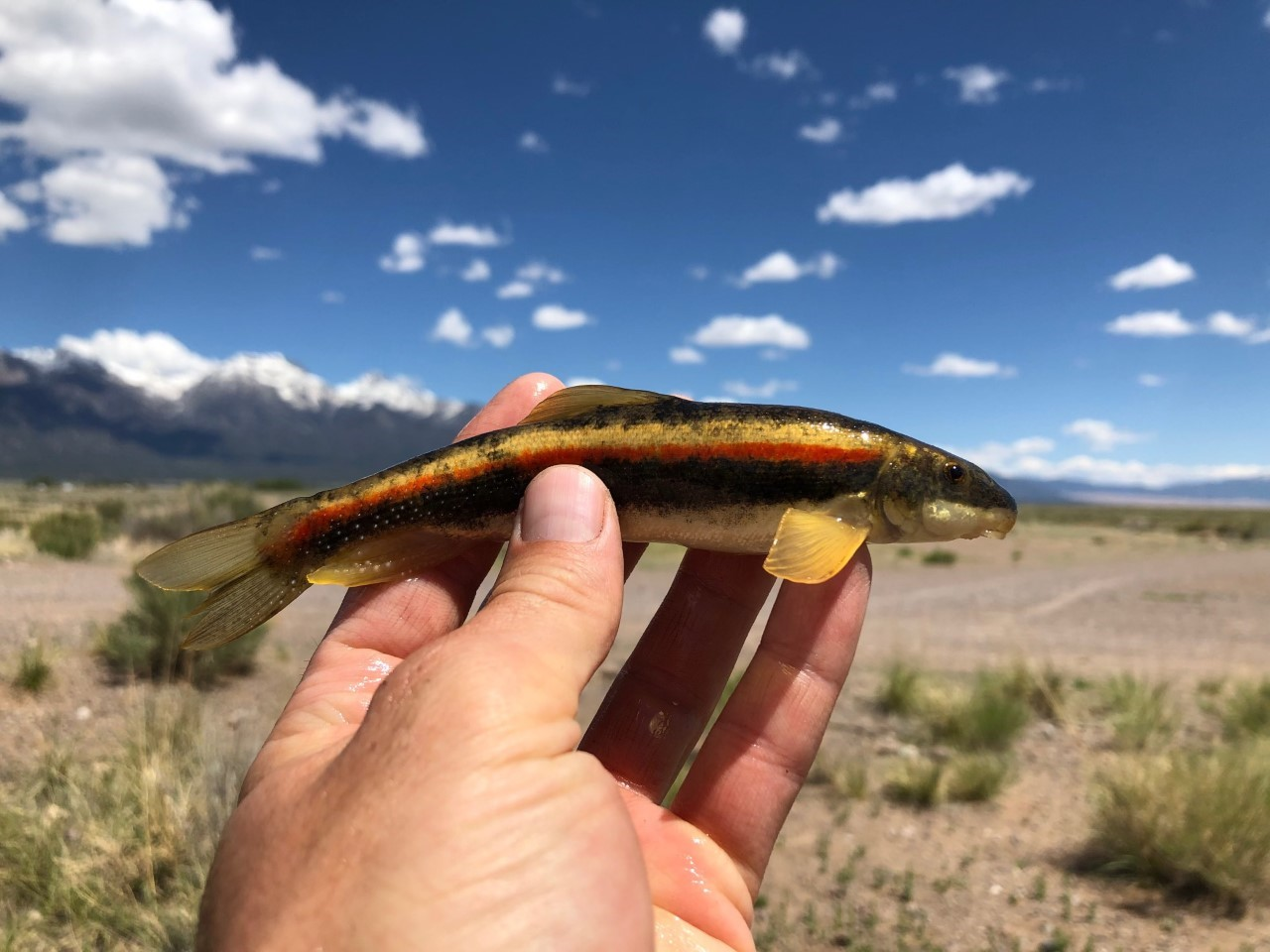
- In breeding coloration

Conservation status
- Data Deficient (IUCN 3.1)

Scientific classification
- Kingdom: Animalia
- Phylum: Chordata
- Class: Actinopterygii
- Order: Cypriniformes
- Family: Catostomidae
- Genus: Pantosteus
- Species: P. plebeius

Binomial name
- Pantosteus plebeius (Baird & Girard, 1854)

Synonyms
- Catostomus plebeius

= Rio Grande sucker =

Species of fish

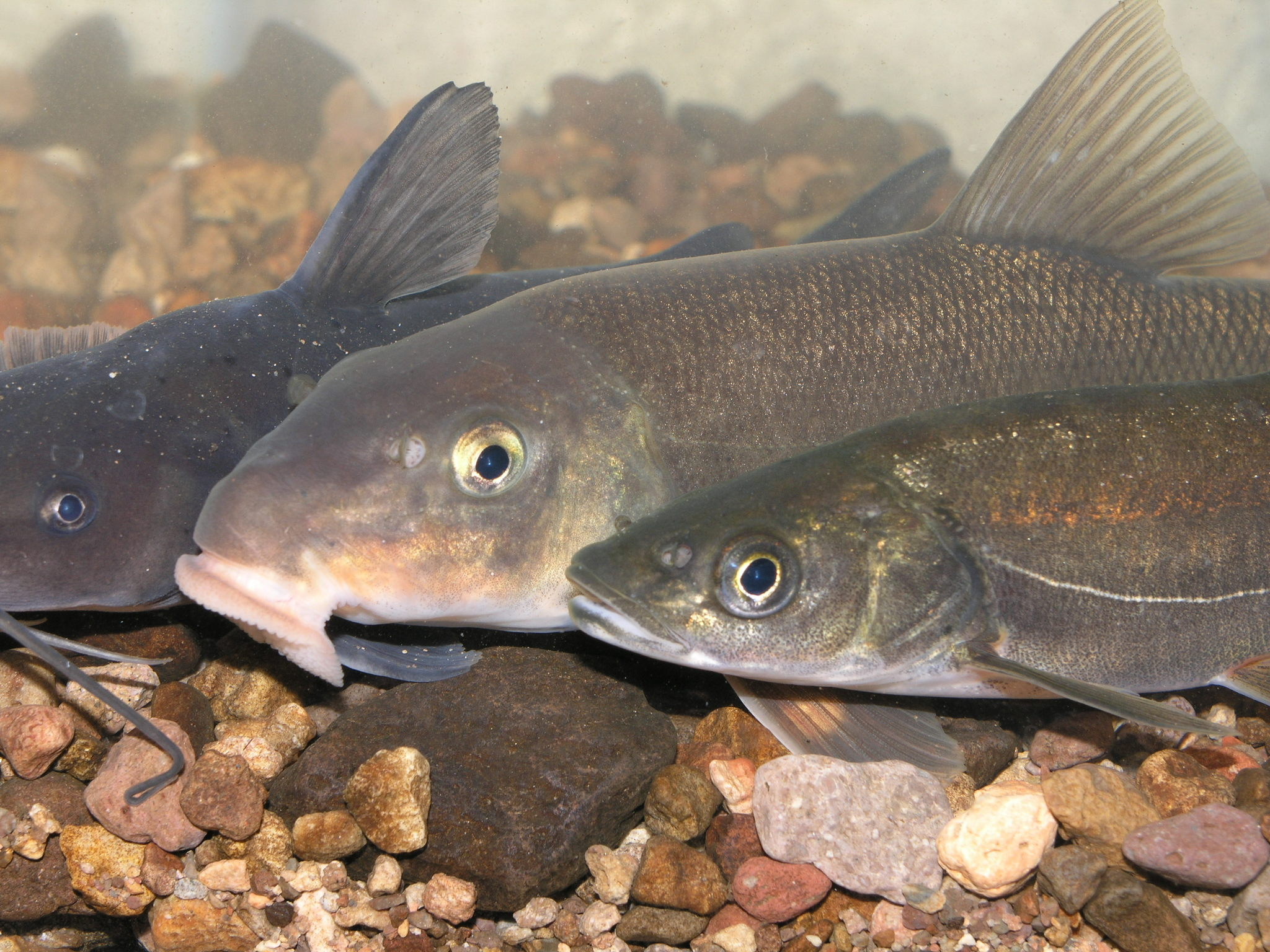
C. bernardini (center) has morphologic similarities to C. plebeius and inhabits regions of the Southwestern United States

The Rio Grande sucker (Pantosteus plebeius) is a North American freshwater fish in the family Catostomidae. It has a typical bottom-feeding phenotype and fills lower trophic levels alongside Rio Grande cutthroat trout and Rio Grande chub species. It is smaller sized in comparison to its other family members, with females being the larger between sexes. Coloration tends to benefit the species due to counter-shading patterns. It is endemic to the Rio Grande basin and was once common throughout. The species has maintained a population in New Mexico, Colorado, Arizona, and Northern Mexico, but has faced challenges from the pressure of non-native species, habitat loss, degradation, and a variety of other aquatic ecosystem changes. There is current pressure from environmental organizations to federally list the species as threatened or endangered.

Formerly placed in the genus Catostomus, it is now placed in the genus Pantosteus.

== Taxonomy ==
The scientific name of the Rio Grande sucker is Catostomus plebeius. The etymology of the name "Catostomus" is Greek, kata = down + Greek, stoma = mouth, which is suggestive of the subterminal mouth orientation. Species name "plebeius" is Latin, belonging to the plebes, or of lower class, commonality. Part of Kingdom Animalia, which encompasses all animals that are multicellular heterotrophs. Fishes, amphibians, reptiles, birds, and mammals fall under the Phylum Chordata which have common morphological characteristics consisting of a notochord, nerve cord, visceral clefts, and arches. Belonging to Class Actinopterygii, or ray-finned fishes, which are the most common and prosperous freshwater and marine fishes. There are three infraclasses to Actinopterygii, in which Teleostei contains the majority of species and includes common fishes such as trout, salmon, flounders, and catfish. A unique feature to superorder Ostariophysi is the Weberian apparatus, a bony connection between the swim bladder and auditory system. The Rio Grande sucker is part of Order Cypriniformes, which include all suckers and minnows. The sucker family, Catostomidae, has populations of different species distributed globally and features similar feeding and spawning characteristics.

== Description ==
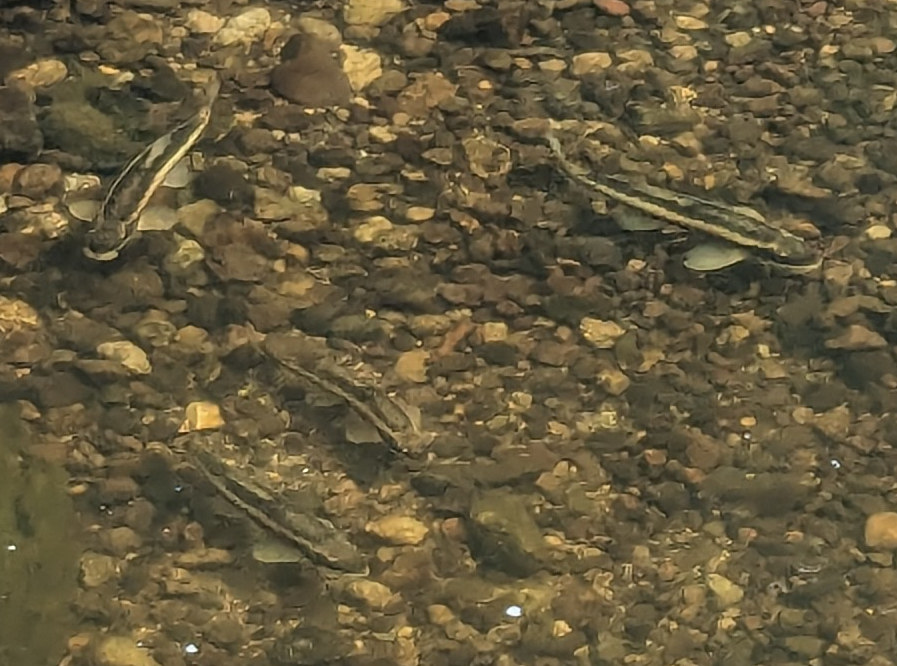
Four Rio Grande suckers in breeding color, photographed in the East Fork of the Jemez River

A smaller member of the family Catostomidae with typical lengths <170 mm (6.7 in). Records indicate that males tend to be smaller than females with one study citing the oldest male captured reached 134 mm (5.3 in) and oldest female was 169 mm (6.7 in). The Rio Grande sucker is distinguished from other members of the genus Catostomus by coloration, head and body shape as well as fins and sexual differences. The head has a broad snout, ventral mouth, thick fleshy lower lip with a deep cleft on each side, and has a cartilaginous ridge of the mandible that is slightly convex. The mouth is fleshy, subterminal, and protractile. A single row of approximately 23 bifurcated pharyngeal teeth exist. Typical body shape is spindle or rod-shaped (terete) with flattening from dorsal to ventral side. The dorsal and lateral sides of the body are brownish green to dusky brown with darker blotches. Breeding males develop bright red lateral stripes. Ventral portions are accentuated by pale and mottled colors leading to a silvery dusky abdominal region. The caudal peduncle is deeper than other members of the genus and the rays are pigmented. Fins contain a range of these rays, the dorsal fin usually has 8–10, pectorals 14–15, pelvic 8–10, and anal fins usually have 7. The dorsal fin is short and triangular, pectorals are bluntly pointed, pelvic fins are oval, and the anal fin is elongated to the base of the caudal fin which is deeply forked.

== Life history ==
The occurrence of spawning is very closely related to water flows and temperature, thus variability throughout the year exists. Peak spawning is typically seen after high flows have occurred, and water tends to be between 51–61 °F (11–16 °C). The highest flows also coincide with spring snowmelt and cooler water temperatures which demonstrate the wide range in the reproductive period, February – June, and occasionally in Autumn months. Food resources also influence breeding. Egg deposition is preferred on clean, gravel substrate. Collection of ova and larva have shown variability in size ranging from 0.5 -1.5mm and around 2mm, respectively. Sexual maturity can happen from 1–3 years of age depending on food resources and body size. Breeding colors are often more dramatic for males than females and tuberculation occurs on both sexes but is distributed differently around the body. Females tend to have tubercles on the caudal peduncle, where males tuberculate on the anal and caudal fins.

== Feeding ==
Mouth morphology dictates feeding strategies within the lower trophic level niche, and like most species within the subgenus, are largely algivorous but will predate on aquatic invertebrates early within their lifecycle. This is due to incomplete ventral migration of the mouth in young of the year, 0–1 years of age, which necessitates a more omnivorous feeding pattern at this life stage. Once the cartilaginous ridge develops it is used for scraping algae or periphyton from rocks, gravel, and other benthic substrates. Sedimentation, competition, and flow can all negatively affect the diet of C. plebeius by depleting primary productivity and food availability.

== Range ==
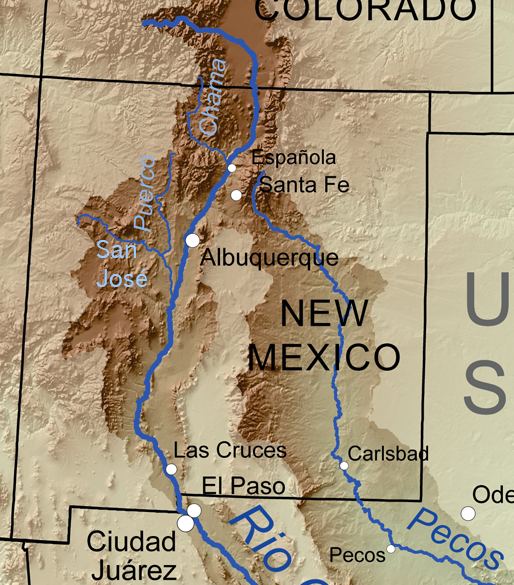
Rio Grande river basin

The southwestern area of the United States has historically held endemic populations in the Rio Grande River and its tributaries, but these have been substantially decreased due to land use, habitat loss, environmental degradation and non-native competition. The Rio Grande sucker has been extirpated from a large portion of its natural range and current populations are much smaller but continue to persist in far Southern Colorado, the Rio Grande basin in New Mexico, Eastern Arizona, and Northern Mexico. The Arizona populations are introduced and established. Major studies of population densities and have occurred primarily in New Mexico. These suggest that the majority of its current range is within waterways of the Santa Fe and Carson National Forests.

== Habitat ==
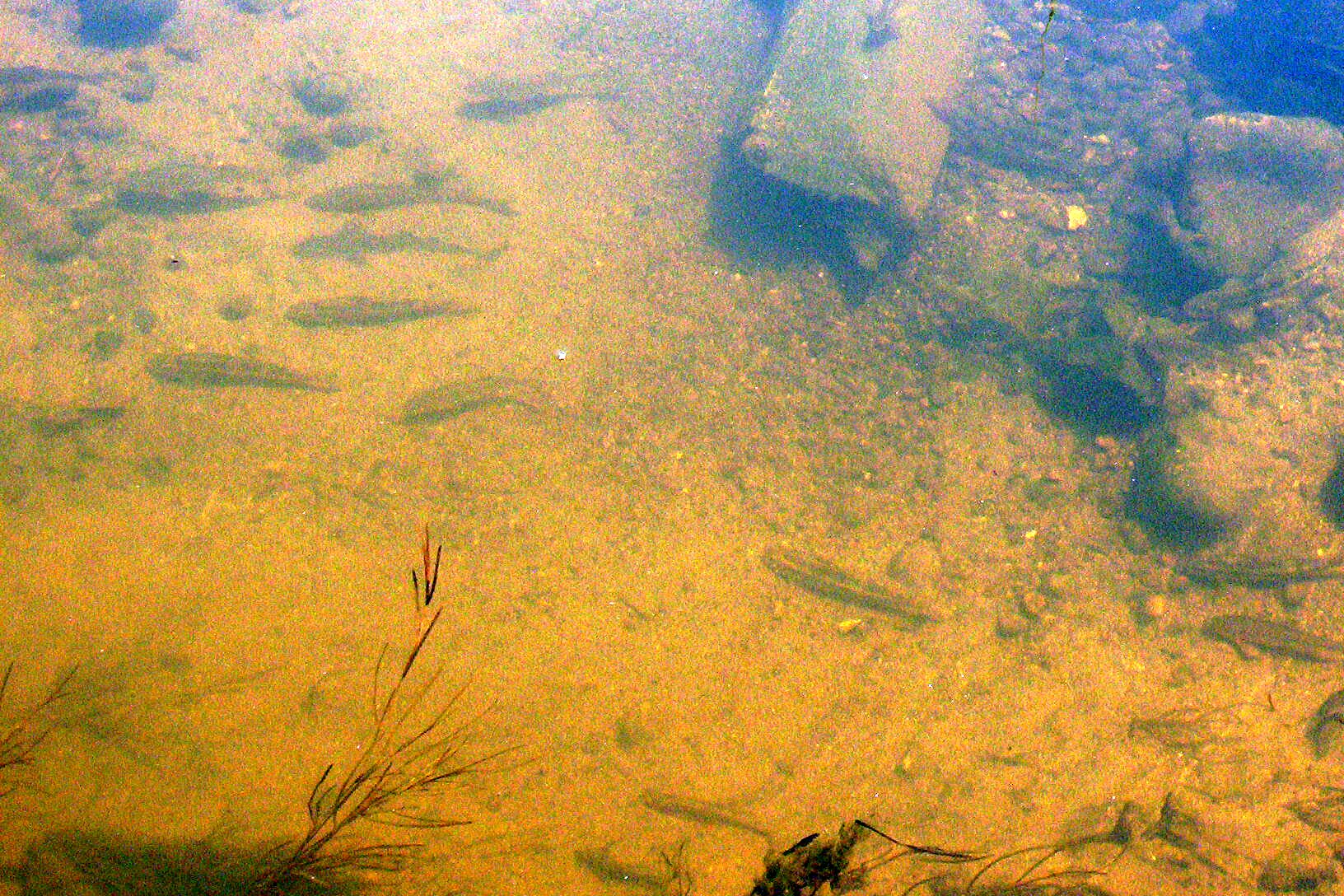
Rio Grande sucker in Baca National Wildlife Refuge

Rio Grande sucker is found in small to large, middle elevation streams and rivers. As an obligate riverine species, the strong correlation between river gradient and populations was hypothesized by (White, 1972), as populations tend to be associated with slower-moving water. A study conducted in Hot Creek, Colorado shows a positive correlation between low turbidity and high aquatic vegetation levels. Stream characteristics such as riffles and glides also had higher levels of Rio Grande sucker. Some studies have shown that glides and pools are the preferred habitat for the adult species and riffles may only fill the spawning life history stage. In-stream large woody debris, clean clear pools, unsorted substrates, and riffles and runs are associated with populations in the Rio Grande Basin of Colorado. However, (Rees and Miller, 2005), emphasize a lack of knowledge about habitat that is positively correlated and suitable for C. plebeius. Negative correlations with species abundance and fine particulate are also noted. What is known, is that human impact on the environment and modification to historically occupied rivers and streams has resulted in habitat destruction. Dramatic changes in the natural structure of the Rio Grande river have occurred with almost complete agricultural diversion and allocation of its average annual flow.

== Conservation and invasive species ==
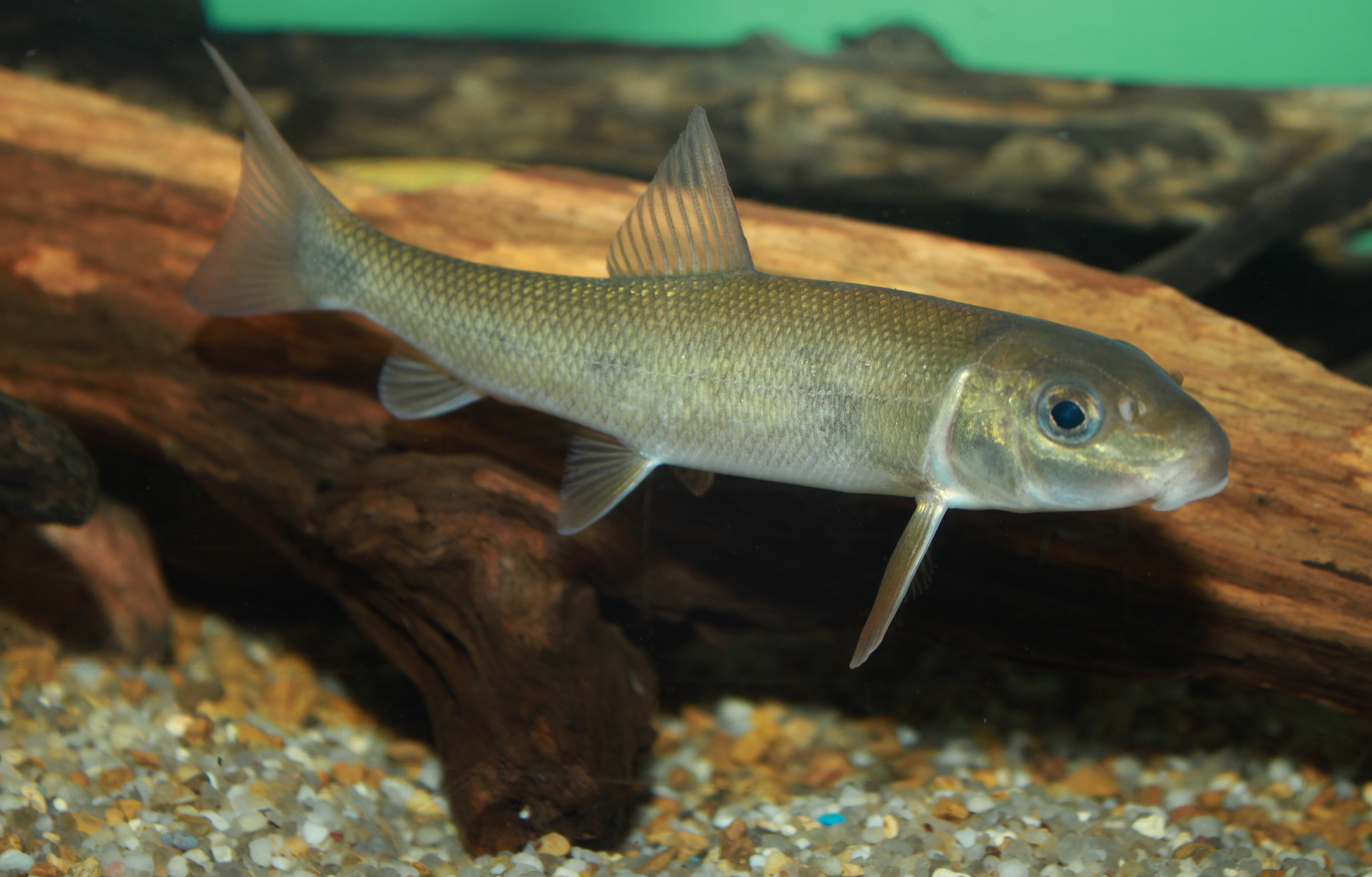
Non-native competition from the White Sucker has disrupted C. plebeius populations

States that have current populations have conducted studies to understand the contractions of abundance. Arizona has listed C. plebeius as a species of concern, while Colorado has the fish listed as endangered. New Mexico has seen large enough numbers that there is no state designation at this time. Two different species compete directly for resources with the Rio Grande sucker. The White sucker, C. commersonii, and the Yaqui sucker, C. bernardini, are known to have increased phenotypic plasticity with their diets which has enhanced their ability to contend for lower trophic level resources. Through different management techniques, there is the possibility to maintain and restore the endemic species. Hydrological considerations include mimicking natural flows, decreasing channelization, and increasing floodplain connectivity. Aquatic vegetation restoration while decreasing non-native vegetative species and maintaining current riparian habitat is intended to help the species. The impact of overgrazing and its correlation to increased turbidity can be addressed if proper riparian buffer zones are sustained or introduced. Also, decreasing the use of pesticides and herbicides can limit water quality degradation.
