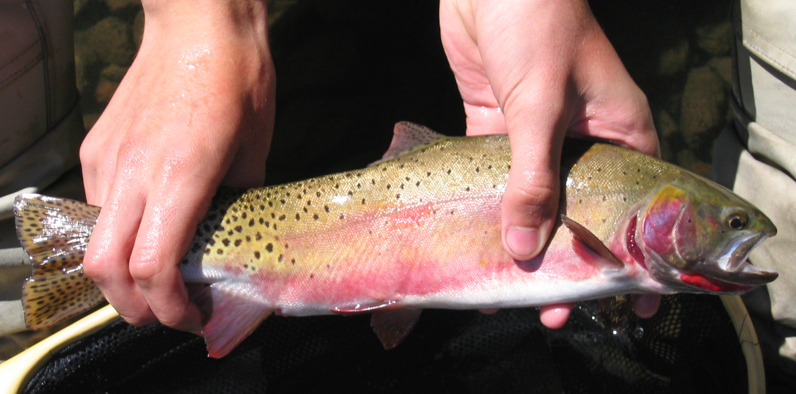
- From the Conejos watershed in southern Colorado

Conservation status
- Vulnerable (NatureServe)

Scientific classification
- Kingdom: Animalia
- Phylum: Chordata
- Class: Actinopterygii
- Division: Teleostei
- Order: Salmoniformes
- Family: Salmonidae
- Genus: Oncorhynchus
- Species: O. virginalis
- Subspecies: O. v. virginalis

Trinomial name
- Oncorhynchus virginalis virginalis (C. F. Girard, 1856)

= Rio Grande cutthroat trout =

Subspecies of fish

The Rio Grande cutthroat trout (Oncorhynchus virginalis virginalis), a member of the family Salmonidae, is found in northern New Mexico and southern Colorado in tributaries of the Rio Grande.

It is one of 9 subspecies of the Rocky Mountain cutthroat trout native to the western United States, and is the state fish of New Mexico. Cutthroat trout were the first New World trout encountered by Europeans when in 1541, Spanish explorer Francisco de Coronado recorded seeing trout in the Pecos River near Santa Fe, New Mexico. These were most likely Rio Grande cutthroat trout (O. v. virginalis).

== Life history ==
Rio Grande cutthroat trout typically spawn between mid-May and mid-June. Males are sexually mature at age two; females mature at age three. They live an average of five years, but in rare cases, may survive into their teens. Rio Grande cutthroat feed opportunistically on aquatic insects and terrestrial insects that fall into the water.

== Description ==
Rio Grande cutthroat trout have variably shaped spots located mostly posteriorly, with fewer and smaller spots above the anterior lateral line. Basibranchial teeth are not prominent or may be absent. Color is variable but often includes red, orange or pink on the opercula and throat, bright rosy to drab olive flanks and yellow-orange undersides.

== Conservation status ==
Rio Grande cutthroat have the distinction of being the southernmost subspecies of cutthroat trout. However, due to the loss of populations across their native range and reports of Rio Grande cutthroat in Mexico and Texas, it is unclear how far south this trout once occurred. The Mexican reports have been all but dismissed, but Garrett and Matlock (1991) provided evidence indicating that Rio Grande cutthroat were likely native to Texas. Today the southernmost known populations are found on the eastern flanks of the Gila Mountains in Southern New Mexico.

Rio Grande cutthroats currently live on 700 miles of stream in the Santa Fe National Forest, which is approximately 91% of their historical range. The Rio Grande cutthroat trout was a candidate for listing under the Endangered Species Act from 2008 to 2014.

In 2014 it was removed from candidacy as it was determined that listing was not warranted for this species. The ruling was challenged by the Center for Biological Diversity, however, and the U.S. Fish and Wildlife Service will reevaluate the species' candidacy.

The Rio Grande cutthroat trout evolved in New Mexico as a member of a native fish assemblage that included the longnose dace, the Rio Grande chub and the Rio Grande sucker.
