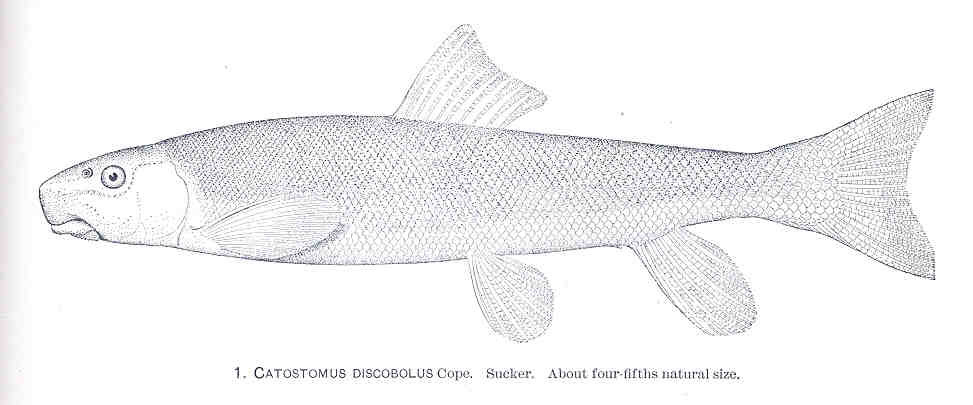

Conservation status
- Least Concern (IUCN 3.1)

Scientific classification
- Kingdom: Animalia
- Phylum: Chordata
- Class: Actinopterygii
- Order: Cypriniformes
- Family: Catostomidae
- Genus: Pantosteus
- Species: P. discobolus

Binomial name
- Pantosteus discobolus (Cope, 1871)

Synonyms
- Catostomus discobolus Cope, 1871

= Pantosteus discobolus =

Bluehead sucker

Species of fish

The bluehead sucker (Pantosteus discobolus) is a species of freshwater cypriniform fish endemic to the intermountain Western US. Formerly placed in the genus Catostomus, it is now placed in the genus Pantosteus.

== Description ==
The bluehead sucker is the largest of all Arizona endemic suckers, reaching lengths over 11.8 in. Their colors are very similar to the desert sucker, with dark green or dark silvery top portions and light yellow bottoms. The bluehead has the largest lips of any sucker and has tiny papillae on the lower lip. This is also the only species with the absence of an inguinal process, just behind the pectoral fins, distinguishing it from the other eight suckers. The lower lip is slightly notched at the midline, with lateral line scales in large numbers that range from 70 to 100. They have 7 to 9 dorsal fin rays and a smaller number of caudal fin rays. During breeding, the males obtain a blue patch on the top of their large heads, and the lower fins become yellow/orange with red/rosy lateral lines. These drastic coloration changes are probably due to sexual selection and female mate choice. An easy way to distinguish the bluehead from the other Arizona suckers is the distinct cartilaginous lower jaw.

== Distribution in Arizona ==
Primary records are concentrated at the Colorado River main stem and the Grand Canyon tributaries, as well as the Colorado River drainages at Lake Mead. Blueheads are also found at Snake River above Shoshone Falls and Bear/Weber River drainages. Scattered reports around the Bonneville Basin have been made. Arizona bluehead sucker distributions are more specifically the Clear, Bright Angel, Shinumo, Kanab, and Havasu Creeks, they are becoming increasingly common below Diamond Creek. Some can be found on the Navajo Reservation and within the San Juan River basin. They can be found at elevations of 609 to 2060 m.

== Habitat ==
Bluehead suckers prefer larger streams and rivers due to their larger size, but they can be found in a variety of habitats. This species has a wide temperature preference, as well, ranging from cold mountain brooks at 12 °C to warmer desert rivers at 27 °C. If times are good and water is clear, the suckers stay in shallow streams and eddies during the day, finding their way to hard-bottomed streams to forage at night. Primary spawning areas include the Grand Canyon tributaries within the Colorado River drainages.

== Reproduction ==
The bluehead sucker spawns in the spring/summer when water temperatures reach > 15 °C. Males join females in gravel/sandy-bottomed streams and copulation begins, taking only a few seconds. In the Grand Canyon tributaries, mating can extend through April, May, and July. This species will not mate unless the water depth is strictly lower than 1 m, probably because the shallow water is easily heated to their desired temperature by the sun. Juveniles grow exponentially fast, reaching lengths of 60 mm and reaching sexual maturity within the first year.

== Biology ==
Suckers use their cartilaginous jaws to scrape the algae and detritus off the stones at the bottom, and despite any shortages of these foods, suckers show little seasonal movement. Diatoms, detritus, algae, and other organic debris have been found in the gut. They can also live to be more than 20 years old.
