= Arkansas darter =

Conservation status
- Near Threatened (IUCN 3.1)

Scientific classification
- Kingdom: Animalia
- Phylum: Chordata
- Class: Actinopterygii
- Order: Perciformes
- Family: Percidae
- Genus: Etheostoma
- Species: E. cragini

Binomial name
- Etheostoma cragini C. H. Gilbert, 1885

Species of fish

The Arkansas darter (Etheostoma cragini) is a species of freshwater ray-finned fish, a darter from the subfamily Etheostomatinae, part of the family Percidae, which also contains the perches, ruffes and pikeperches. It is endemic to the United States where it is found in Kansas, Arkansas, Missouri, Colorado, and Oklahoma.

== Description ==
The Arkansas darter has an olive-brown dorsal surface spotted with fine black markings, and a yellowish-white underside except that in males during the breeding season, the belly turns bright orange. It has a blackish wedge-shaped blotch beneath its eye and there are 12 to 14 dark stripes along the sides. This species reaches a maximum size of 6 cm (2.4 in).

== Distribution ==
The Arkansas darter, despite its name, is primarily found in Kansas. However, its range encompasses the Arkansas River drainage system and this extends into eastern Colorado, southwestern Missouri, northeastern Arkansas and north-central Oklahoma, as well.

== Behavior ==
The Arkansas darter moves up and down stream by as much as several kilometers in accordance with varying water flows. It feeds on small insects and their larvae and sometimes consumes plant material such as seeds. It reaches sexual maturity at about a year and spawns during the spring and summer. The eggs are laid in shallow water on gravel bottoms in open areas or among organic debris accumulations.

== Status ==
The IUCN lists the Arkansas darter as being Near Threatened. It has a limited distribution and threats to this species include the lowering of the water level in streams resulting from groundwater pumping in the western part of its range, and potential development pressures in the eastern part. Drought can also cause water levels to fall and runoff from feed lots may cause pollution.
