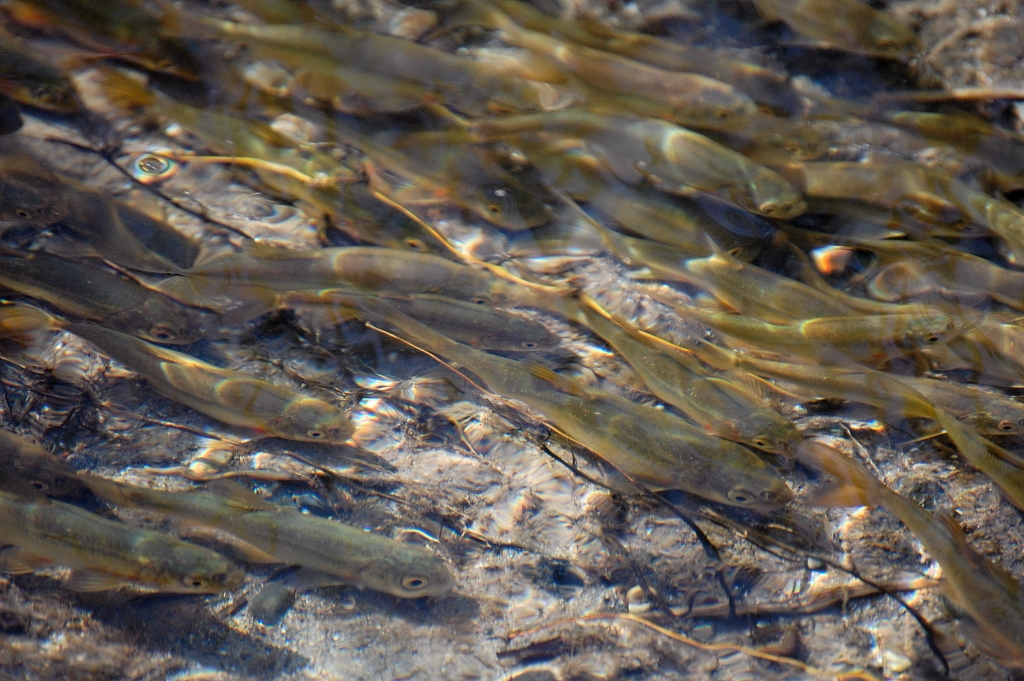

Conservation status
- Least Concern (IUCN 3.1)

Scientific classification
- Kingdom: Animalia
- Phylum: Chordata
- Class: Actinopterygii
- Order: Cypriniformes
- Family: Leuciscidae
- Genus: Gila
- Species: G. pandora

Binomial name
- Gila pandora (Cope, 1872)

Synonyms
- Clinostomus pandora Cope, 1872; Tigoma gracilis Girard, 1854; Gila gula Cope, 1875

= Rio Grande chub =

Species of fish

The Rio Grande chub (Gila pandora) is a species of freshwater ray-finned fish belonging to the family Leuciscidae, which includes the daces, chubs, Eurasian minnows and related species. This fish is endemic to the United States. It inhabits the upper Rio Grande and Pecos River systems in Colorado, New Mexico and Texas. The Rio Grande chub is native to most of its current range including all three of the states it can be found in. There are non-native populations that currently inhabit Coyote Creek, the Mora River, the Sapello River and other areas in New Mexico. There are currently no studies showing how the Rio Grande chub is impacting waterways in its non-native range. It has also been proposed that this fish is native to the Canadian River in New Mexico but this has not been proven. It is possible it was introduced there. Natural hybridization can occur between the Rio Grande chub and the longnose dace (Rhinichthys cataractae).

== Physical characteristics ==
Physical characteristics that can be used to identify the Rio Grande chub include the head, eyes, tail, and size. Adults of this species can grow as large as 30 centimeters however they are typically much smaller. In Colorado, they are usually about 13 cm long. The Rio Grande chub has large eyes and an elongated head. They also have a forked tail. They typically have a dark dorsal side, or back. They have a light underside. The colors gradually get lighter as you move to the ventral side. They have two faint black lines along the sides of their body. One these lines is above the fish's lateral line and the other is below. While these fish are breading, the fins, sides, and mouth of the fish will take on a yellowish color. Males will express brighter colors than females during this period.

More detailed identification can be achieved by counting the number of scales that make up this fish's lateral line. The Rio Grade chub will have between 51 and 67 scales that create the lateral line. There are also 8 rays in both the dorsal and anal fin. This fish also has 6 to 10 gill rakers.

== Habitat ==
The Rio Grande chub can be found in small, flowing bodies of water. Small streams and rivers, headwaters, and flowing pools are this fish's preferred habitat. They have also been found in small lakes and ponds. Occasionally, the Rio Grade chub will live in engineered waterways. Examples of this include irrigation ditches, canals, and stock ponds. The Rio Grande chub prefers cool, flowing water. They also require cover within their habitat. Undercut banks, overhanging vegetation, in-stream woody material, and in-stream vegetation all provide this fish enough cover for suitable habitat. There is also some evidence that they like areas with a bottom consisting of sand, gravel, cobble, or a combination of the three. This fish needs gravel and cobble areas to spawn. They can be found between 7580 and 8400 feet in elevation and between 12 and 69 inches in the water column.

== Diet ==
The Rio Grande chub is characterized by some as a mid-water carnivore. This fish preys on zooplankton, insects, crustaceans, and juvenile fish. The Rio Grande chub also exhibits some omnivore behavior. They will eat limited vegetation and some amount of detritus. Beyond this, very little is known about the feeding habits of this fish. Its specific food preferences are not known. Likewise, the impacts of habitat, migration, and competition on this fish's feeding have not been studied. One study did show that Rio Grande chub have a higher success rate when they prey on larvae with smaller cases. This fish evolved alongside the Rio Grande Cutthroat trout and the Rio Grande sucker. It fills a unique tropic position within the ecosystems it is found in. There is no evidence that any other fish can fill this position in place of the Rio Grande chub.

== Conservation concerns ==
The Rio Grande chub does not currently have any federal protections or listings under the Endangered Species Act. However, the US Forest Service lists this fish as a sensitive species. It is also listed as a sensitive species with the Bureau of Land Management. Populations of the Rio Grande chub have significantly decided from historical levels. At one point, this chub was the most common fish in the Rio Grande Watershed. It is estimated that overall numbers have declined by 75 percent. One of the largest factors that has been attributed to the decline of the Rio Grande chub is the introduction of other non-native fishes. Brook trout and Brown trout were both introduced into the Rio Grande watershed. They replaced the Rio Grande Cutthroat trout as ecosystem's top predator. Both of these species compete with the Rio Grande chub for resources. They also prey upon the chub. Other non-natives like Common carp and northern pike are also suspected to prey on the Rio Grande chub at various stages along its life cycle.

Habitat fragmentation and destruction have also reduced Rio Grande chub numbers. Impoundments such as dams and diversions have fragmented this fish's habitat and interfere with its migration and colonization efforts. Dams prevent genetic exchange between population. Water released from dams also changes the thermal regime of the water the Rio Grande chub inhabits. This has created colder conditions in the winter and warmer water in the summer then what was historically present. Some Rio Grande habitat has been destroyed by human manipulations. These include overgrazing in riparian areas, constriction of roads and bridges in areas with highly erodible soil, and bad timer harvest practices. All of these factors, and many more, change the chemistry and geometry of Rio Grande chub habitat which negatively impacts the fish.

In Colorado, the Rio Grande chub is listed as a species of concern. It is designated a tier 1 species of greatest conservation needed. Population declines in Colorado can be attributed to habitat destruction and the introduction of non-native species. Many of the populations in Colorado are isolated which increases the likelihood of further decline.

Conservation efforts for the Rio Grande chub are focused on many areas. Conservation requires further study on this fish's habitat requirements and life history. Some efforts are focused on maintaining natural streamflow conditions. This includes reducing the amount of water diverted from Rio Grande chub habitat and limiting the amount sediment in waterways. Other efforts focus on protecting the vegetation that is critical for Rio Grande chub habitat. New regulations are also intended to limit the amount of livestock grazing in riparian areas and prohibit bad land use practices that increase erosion and the sediment load in the water.
