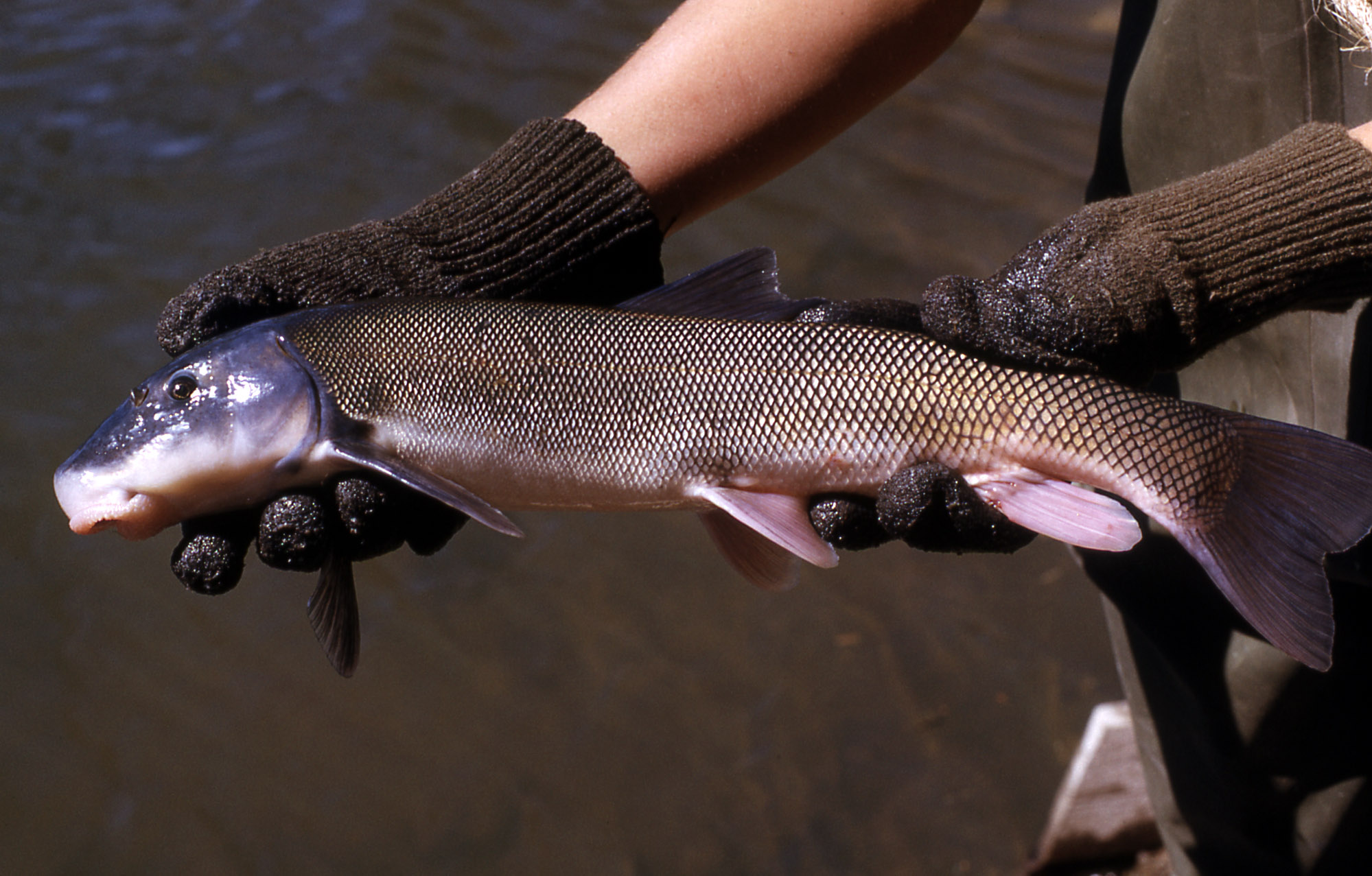

Conservation status
- Least Concern (IUCN 3.1)

Scientific classification
- Kingdom: Animalia
- Phylum: Chordata
- Class: Actinopterygii
- Division: Teleostei
- Order: Cypriniformes
- Family: Catostomidae
- Genus: Pantosteus
- Species: P. platyrhynchus

Binomial name
- Pantosteus platyrhynchus (Cope, 1874)

Synonyms
- Minomus platyrhynchus Cope, 1874; Catostomus platyrhynchus (Cope, 1874); Minomus delphinus Cope, 1871; Pantosteus delphinus (Cope, 1871); Pantosteus jordani Evermann, 1895

= Mountain sucker =

Species of fish

The mountain sucker (Pantosteus platyrhynchus) is a sucker found throughout western North America, on both sides of the Rocky Mountains, including the upper Missouri River, Columbia River, Sacramento River, and Colorado River. It was formerly placed in the genus Catostomus, but was later moved to the genus Pantosteus, while still remaining in the Catostomidae family. Recent phylogenetic studies suggest that it comprises three species: P. platyrhynchus sensu stricto found in the northern Great Basin, P. lahontan found in Nevada and northeastern California, and P. jordani found east of the Rocky Mountains. The name “Catostomidae” is derived from the New Latin words “cato,” meaning “down,” and “stoma,” meaning “mouth,” and refers to their inferior (downward pointing) mouths positioned on the underside of the fish, which is characteristic of sucker fish. The lips of the mouth are protruding, fleshy, and covered with numerous papillae; this, along with the positioning of the mouth, facilitate the fish’s feeding habits of scraping food off of river bottoms. Both the upper and bottom lips are cleft at the junction of the lips.

== Description ==
This is a slender and streamlined sucker, generally olive green to brown above and on the sides, and white to yellowish underneath. There may be a pattern of darker blotches along the sides. Adult males will also have a dark red-orange band over a dark green band on each side, and during breeding season their fins will take on a red-orange shade also. Although the species epithet platyrhynchus means "flat snout", the snout is not actually less round than in other suckers. The mouth is underneath, framed by large and protrusible lips covered with many papillae. The inner margin of the lower lip has two semicircular bare areas, and a cartilaginous plate used for scraping. Just above the nine-rayed pelvic fins there are small protrusions on each side.

The average size of mountain suckers is around 12 centimetres (4.7 in) total length, with females typically growing larger than males. This pattern of females growing larger than males is characteristic in the majority of fish species, and holds true for the mountain sucker as well. The dorsal (top) side of the fish is a dark olive or brown color, while the ventral (under) side is usually yellow to white in color. Typically, the body is slender and sleek, but during spawning season, breeding males typically develop hard, keratinized tubercles, also called nodes, over their entire body with the exception of the dorsal fin. Females develop tubercles as well, but they are only found on the dorsal and lateral sides of the head and body. Additionally, mature males exhibit bright orange and black lateral stripes when sexually mature, while females present a duller, less noticeable red lateral stripe at sexual maturity. Juveniles are mostly similar in appearance to the adults, but typically darker in color, and female mountain suckers will generally grow to be larger than the males.

== Distribution and habitat ==
The mountain sucker's range is quite extensive in the United States, but extremely limited in Canada. In Canada, they can be found in Saskatchewan, Alberta, and British Columbia. In the United States, it is found on both sides of the Rocky Mountains, including the upper Missouri River, Columbia River, Sacramento River, and Colorado River. Other states where it is found include California, Oregon, Washington, Nevada, Colorado, Idaho, Montana, and Wyoming.

While sucker fishes can be found in a variety of different habitats, mountain suckers are commonly found in cool, clear, and somewhat shallow rivers. They prefer pools of water within these rivers, but generally do not prefer large bodies of water and as such are, they are not commonly found in lakes. While some populations of mountain suckers may be found in some small lakes throughout their range, they are noticeably absent from larger lakes such as the Great Lakes and Lake Tahoe, even though these lakes occur within their range. They are usually found in rivers with depths of less than 2 metres (6.6 ft) but between 2–15 metres (6.6–49.2 ft) wide. The most common elevation to find mountain suckers is at medium elevations, no higher than 2,800 metres (9,200 ft). They also prefer rocky bottoms as this provides the best opportunity to forage for their food sources, but can also be found in rivers and pools with logs, undercut banks, and rubble or sandy bottoms. Perennial streams seem to be preferred by mountain suckers, and at lower elevations they are found in shallower gradient streams while they are found more commonly in steeper gradient streams at higher elevations.

== Ecology ==
Contrary to many western North American fish found in streams, mountain suckers typically spawn in midsummer (from late May or early June through mid-to-late August) rather than in the spring. Details of their spawning is somewhat unclear but one study by Breeggemann et al. (2014), taking place in the Black Hills region of South Dakota and which examined the otoliths of study specimens of mountain suckers, reports that they appeared to either exhibit protracted spawning or highly differential growth rates in individual fry in the first year of life. Protracted spawning refers to spawning that takes place over a long period of time, weeks to months, as opposed to at one time. Additionally, it was previously believed that mountain suckers only spawn in river habitats, but a 2018 study by Arostegui (2018) taking place in a Utah lake reports what may be the first documented case of mountain suckers spawning in lake habitats.

While mountain suckers can live up to 9 years of age, the age of sexual maturity generally ranges from 3 to 6 years. One study taking place in South Dakota sampled mountain suckers ages 3 to 6 years old and concluded that around half of the sampled suckers were sexually mature at 3 years, nearly three-quarters of sampled fish were sexually mature by age 4, and by age 5, nearly all (93%) of the suckers were sexually mature. 100% of sampled fish were found to be sexually mature by age 6. Males reach sexual maturity about a year earlier than females on average, which is another feature common in most sucker species and fish in general.

Spawning behavior usually takes place near the shoreline of rivers and consists of spawning aggregates of 8-10 males where the males compete for space around a single female. Spawning occurs in low but stable flows of water of temperatures of 11–19 °C (52–66 °F). Males in mountain sucker mating aggregates have at times been observed leaving the aggregate while displaying diminished swimming movement and speed and foraging elsewhere in the stream before rejoining the aggregate. This behavior displays the competition that takes place between males in mating aggregates.

== Conservation status ==
While the mountain sucker is generally considered a non-threatened species, it has been in noticeable decline in recent history and is a listed species in certain parts of its range, such as in South Dakota, where it is considered a species of greatest conservation.

Threats to the species include pollution from agriculture and forestry industries, habitat loss, and depleting water levels in streams, and invasive species. One example of the influence of invasive species on mountain sucker populations was shown in the Black Hill regions of South Dakota, where it was noted that mountain suckers occurred less in streams where both mountain suckers and the introduced brown trout were found together as opposed to streams where just mountain suckers and not brown trout were found. Brown trout are known to outcompete medium to large fish in areas they are introduced to, and this appears to be happening to the mountain sucker as well.

One issue slowing the research and conservation of mountain suckers and sucker species as a whole is the difficulty of differentiating species, which can be difficult even to a well-trained eye. Additionally, many regional guidebooks that are used for identification do not include all suckers that may be found in the area, leading to confusion and easily misidentifying species. This is especially apparent in early life stages, when they may be even harder to distinguish. Many agencies and bodies that monitor fish also tend to lump sucker species into one category rather than differentiating them to a species level. Even many research papers report being unable to confidently and accurately distinguish mountain sucker fry from other similar species.

Negative perceptions of sucker species has also taken a toll on their ability to be properly studied, monitored, or conserved. One common perception, for example, is that they are tolerant of less than favorable water conditions, such as murky, dirty, or polluted waters. However, while they may be somewhat more tolerant than other visible indicator species, they are only tolerant of so much change and have been shown to be intolerant to certain factors such as silt. Additionally, there are negative perceptions of suckers pertaining to them being detrimental to other freshwater species, specifically due to predation on juveniles of other species. These perceptions are perpetuated by management practices aimed at eradicating sucker populations from certain waterways in order to improve recreational fisheries. However, not all sucker populations have the same feeding practices, and the mountain sucker is not known to feed on juveniles of other species. Nonetheless, due to the aforementioned issue of suckers oftentimes being lumped together in a similar group, these differences in diet and ecosystem effects are often lost on the general public.

While there is not much available information or research done on how climate change may affect mountain sucker populations, it is possible that warming waters can affect the timing and locations of spawning. Additionally, altered waterflow from droughts or floods may impact spawning, survivability of juvenile mountain suckers, food availability, and ability to traverse waterways.

Conservation strategies for the mountain sucker along with other suckers include restoration of damaged habitat, fish bypass systems that are effective for suckers, and protecting critical habitat utilized by suckers, particularly in regions of high concern, such as in South Dakota. Further research into sucker species in general, and specifically the mountain sucker, will improve the scientific understanding of how populations of this species are fairing and help identify further ways that they can be protected in the ranges in which they are in severe decline or listed as a species of greatest conservation.
