= Sacramento–San Joaquin =

Freshwater ecoregion in California

Sacramento–San Joaquin is a freshwater ecoregion in California. It includes the Sacramento and San Joaquin river systems of California's Central Valley, which converge in the inland Sacramento–San Joaquin Delta. It also includes the mostly-closed Tulare Lake basin in the southern Central Valley, the rivers and streams that empty into San Francisco Bay, and the Pajaro and Salinas river systems of Central California which empty into Monterey Bay.

== Geography ==
The ecoregion covers an area of 176,170 square kilometres (68,020 mi^{2}), which covers 45% of California. 99% of the ecoregion is in California, with a small portion – the Goose Lake basin – extending into southern Oregon.

The Central Valley extends north and south, bounded on the east by the Sierra Nevada, and on the west by the Coast Ranges. The Sacramento River originates in the mountains ringing the northern Central Valley and flows southwards. The San Joaquin originates in the southern Sierra and flows northwards to meet the Sacramento in the inland Sacramento–San Joaquin Delta. Both are joined by tributaries flowing westward from the Sierra.

In the southern Central Valley, the Kings and Kaweah River flowed from headwaters in southern Sierra to empty into shallow Tulare Lake, and the Kern River flowed into Buena Vista Lake. This basin was mostly endorheic or closed, and Tulare and Buena Vista lakes would seasonally expand with winter rains and spring runoff, and contract during the summer dry season. During periods of extreme flood the lakes would expand further and overtop the low divides separating them, and separating Tulare Lake from the San Joaquin River.

San Francisco Bay occupies a gap in the Coast Ranges, and connects the Sacramento–San Joaquin Delta to the Pacific Ocean. A number of smaller rivers and creeks empty into San Francisco bay from origins in the hills and mountains ringing the bay.

The Salinas River originates in the coast ranges of Central California, and flows northwards through the Salinas Valley to empty into Monterey Bay.

The ecoregion also includes the Carrizo Plain, an endorheic basin in the Coast Ranges of Central California.

== Fauna ==
The ecoregion is home to 40 species of fish. These include five species of salmonids – chinook salmon (Oncorhynchus tshawytscha), pink salmon (O. gorbuscha), chum salmon (O. keta), coho salmon (O. kisutch), and steelhead (O. mykiss). These species are typically anadromous, migrating to the sea from their birthplace streams, and returning as adults to their rivers of origin to spawn. This pattern of returning to ancestral streams has given rise to distinct populations of the various species which have adaptations to their specific watersheds. Steelhead which are blocked from migrating to the sea are known as rainbow trout, and mature and breed in their native rivers. The ecoregion is also home to several distinct subspecies of rainbow trout, including the Little Kern golden trout (O. m. whitei), South Fork Kern golden trout (O. m. aguabonita), and Kern River rainbow trout (O. m. gilberti). Other anadromous native fishes include lampreys, sturgeon, and smelt.

The ecoregion is home to eight endemic species, in five endemic genera - Archoplites, Pogonichthys, Orthodon, Lavinia, and Mylopharodon. Fish species endemic to the ecoregion include the Sacramento perch (Archoplites interruptus), Delta smelt (Hypomesus transpacificus), Sacramento splittail (Pogonichthys macrolepidotus), rough sculpin (Cottus asperrimus), tule perch (Hysterocarpus traskii), Sacramento pikeminnow (Ptychocheilus grandis), Kern brook lamprey (Lampetra hubbsi), and hardhead (Mylopharodon conocephalus).

== Conservation and threats ==
The Central and Salinas valleys have mostly been converted to productive agricultural regions. Many of the ecoregion's rivers have been dammed, and spring runoff is impounded and used for irrigation during the summer dry season. A portion of the Sacramento's flow is diverted to farms and cities in the southern Central Valley and Southern California. Many rivers and streams are contained in levees or have been channelized, and most of the ecoregion's floodplain wetlands, including Tulare Lake, and its riparian forests have been converted to farmland. Runoff from farms and livestock pastures carries pollutants into the rivers and streams.

== Protected areas ==
Ramsar Sites (wetlands of international importance) in the ecoregion include Elkhorn Slough on Monterey Bay, San Francisco Bay and Estuary, and Grassland Ecological Area in the San Joaquin Valley.
