= List of freshwater fish in California =

An extensive list of the freshwater fish found in California, including both native and introduced species.

Common name	Scientific name	Image	Native	Non-Native	Notes
Pacific Lamprey	Lampetra tridentata		check		
River Lamprey	Lampetra ayresl		check		
Pit-Klamath Brook Lamprey	Lampetra lethophaga		check		
Klamath River Lamprey	Lampetra simiiis		check		
Kern Brook Lamprey	Lampetra hubbsi		check		
Western Brook Lamprey	Lampetra ricchardsoni		check		
White Sturgeon	Acipenser transmontanus		check		
Green Sturgeon	Acipenser medirostris		check		
American Shad	Alosa sapidissima			check	
Threadfin Shad	Dorosoma petenense			check	
Coho Salmon or Silver Salmon	Oncorhynchus kisutch		check		
Chinook Salmon or King Salmon	Oncorhynchus tshawytscha		check		
Kokanee Salmon or Sockeye Salmon	Oncorhynchus nerka		check	check	
Pink Salmon	Oncorhynchus gorbuscha		check		
Chum Salmon	Oncorhynchus keta		check		
Rainbow Trout	Oncorhynchus mykiss		check		
Coastal Rainbow Trout or Steelhead Trout	Oncorhyncus mykiss irideus		check		
California Golden Trout	Oncorhynchus mykiss aguabonita		check		
Little Kern Golden Trout	Oncorhynchus mykiss whitel		check		
Kern River Rainbow Trout	Oncorhynchus mykiss gilberti		check		
Sacramento Redband Trout	Oncorhynchus mykiss stonei		check		
Eagle Lake Rainbow Trout	Oncorhynchus mykiss aquilarum		check		
Cutthroat Trout	Oncorhynchus clarkii		check		
Coastal Cutthroat Trout	Oncorhynchus clarkii clarkii		check		
Lahontan Cutthroat Trout	Oncorhynchus clarkii henshawl		check		
Paiute Cutthroat Trout	Oncorhynchus clarkii seleniris		check		
Bull Trout	Salvelinus confluentus		check		
Brook Trout	Salvelinus fontinalls			check	
Brown Trout	Salmo trutta			check	
Lake Trout or Mackinaw Trout	Salvelinus namaycush			check	
Mountain Whitefish	Prosoplum williamsoni		check		
Delta Smelt	Hypomesus transpacificus		check		
Wakasagi	Hypomesus nipponensis			check	
Longfin Smelt	Spirinchus thalechthys		check		
Eulachon	Thaleichthys pacificus		check		
California Roach	Lavinia symmetricus		check		
Hitch	Lavinia exilicauda		check		
Lahontan Redside	Richarsonius egregius		check		
Speckled Dace	Rhinichthys osculus		check		
Tui Chub	Siphateles bicolor		check		
Mojave Tui Chub	Siphateles bicolor mohavensis		check		
Owens Tui Chub	Siphateles bicolor snyderi		check		
Blue Chub	Gila coerulea		check		
Arroyo Chub	Gila orcutti		check		
Thicktail Chub	Gila crassicauda		check		
Bonytail	Gila elegans		check		
Sacramento Splittail	Pogonichthys macrolepidotus		check		
Clear Lake Splittail	Pogonichthys ciscoldes		check		
Hardhead	Mylopharodon conocephalus		check		
Sacramento Blackfish	Orthodon microlepidotus		check		
Sacramento Pikeminnow	Ptychochellus grandis		check		
Colorado Pikeminnow	Ptychochellus luclus		check		
Common Carp	Cyprinus carpio			check	
Goldfish	Carassius auratus			check	
Golden Shiner	Notemigonus crysoleucas			check	
Red Shiner	Cyprinella lutrensis			check	
Fathead Minnow	Pimephales promelas			check	
Tench	Tinca tinca			check	
Grass Carp	Ctenopharyngodon idella			check	
Sacramento Sucker	Catostomus occidentalls		check		
Goose Lake Sucker	Catostomus occidentalis lacusanserinus		check		
Tahoe Sucker	Catostomus tahoensis		check		
Owens Sucker	Catostomus fumelventris		check		
Lost River Sucker	Catostomus luxatus		check		
Klamath Largescale Sucker	Catostomus snyderi		check		
Klamath Smallscale Sucker	Catostomus rimiculus		check		
Modoc Sucker	Catostomus microps		check		
Santa Ana Sucker	Catostomus santaanae		check		
Razorback Sucker	Xyrauchen texanus		check		
Shortnose Sucker	Chasmistes brevirostris		check		
Brown Bullhead	Amelurus nebulosus			check	
Mountain Sucker	Catostomus platyrhynchus		check		
Black Bullhead	Amelurus melas			check	
Yellow Bullhead	Amelurus natalls			check	
Channel Catfish	Ictalurus puctatus			check	
Blue Catfish	Ictalurus furcatus			check	
White Catfish	Ameriurus catus			check	
Flathead Catfish	Plyodictis olivaris			check	
Amargosa Pupfish	Cyprinodon nevadensis		check		
Desert Pupfish	Cyprinodon macularius		check		
Salt Creek Pupfish	Cyprinodon salinus		check		
Owens Pupfish	Cyprinodon radiosus		check		
California Killifish	Fundulus parvipinnis		check		
Rainwater Killifish	Lucania parva			check	
Western Mosquitofish	Gambusia affinis			check	
Sailfin Molly	Poecilla latipinna			check	
Porthole Livebearer	Poecillopsis gracilis			check	
Inland Silverside	Menidia beryllina			check	
Threespine Stickleback	Gasterosteus aculeatus		check		
Brook Stickleback	Culaea inconstans			check	
Striped Bass	Morone saxatilis			check	
White Bass	Morone chrysops			check	
Sacramento Perch	Archoplites interruptus		check		
Bluegill	Lepomis macrochirus			check	
Redear Sunfish	Lepomis microlophus			check	
Pumpkinseed	Lepomis gibbosus			check	
Green Sunfish	Lepomis cyanellus			check	
Warmouth	Lepomis gulosus			check	
White Crappie	Pomoxis annularis			check	
Black Crappie	Pomoxis nigromaculatus			check	
Largemouth Bass	Micropterus salmoides			check	
Smallmouth Bass	Micropterus dolomieu			check	
Spotted Bass	Micropterus punctulatus			check	
Redeye Bass	Micropterus coosae			check	
Yellow Perch	Perca flavescens			check	
Bigscale Logperch	Percina macrolepida			check	
Mozambique Tilapia	Oreochromis mossambicus			check	
Redbelly Tilapia	Tilapia zillii			check	
Blue Tilapia	Oreochromis aureus			check	
Nile Tilapia	Oreochromis niloticus			check	
Tuleperch	Hysterocarpus traski		check		
Shiner Perch	Cymatogaster aggregata		check		
Striped Mullet	Mugil cephalus		check		
Yellowfin Goby	Acanthogoblus flavimanus			check	
Shimofuri Goby	Tridentiger bifasclatus			check	
Tidewater Goby	Eucyclogoblus newberryi		check		
Prickly Sculpin	Cottus asper		check		
Riffle Sculpin	Cottus gulosus		check		
Pit Sculpin	Cottus pitensis		check		
Coastrange Sculpin	Cottus aleuticus		check		
Reticulate Sculpin	Cottus perplexus		check		
Marbled Sculpin	Cottus klamathensis		check		
Rough Sculpin	Cottus asperrimus		check		
Paiute Sculpin	Cottus beldingi		check		
Pacific Staghorn Sculpin	Leptocottus armatus		check		
Starry Flounder	Platichthys stellatus		check		
Northern Pike	Esox lucius			check	
