= Fauna of California =

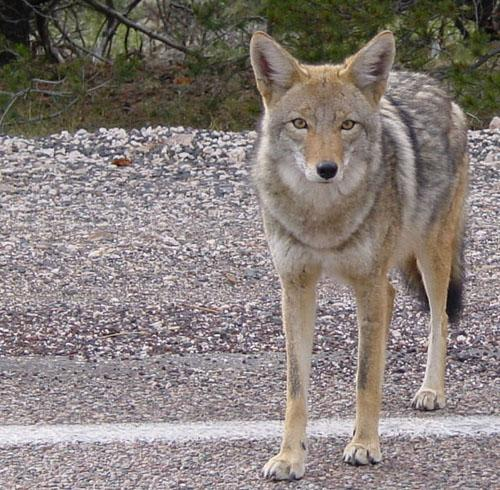
Coyotes live in every habitat in California, from the arid deserts in the south to foggy coastal regions in the north.

The fauna of the U.S. state of California may be the most diverse in the United States. Of the lower 48 contiguous states, California has the greatest diversity in climate, terrain, and geology. The state's six life zones are the lower Sonoran (desert); upper Sonoran (foothill regions and some coastal lands); transition (coastal areas and moist northeastern counties); and the Canadian, Hudsonian, and Arctic zones, comprising California's highest elevations. California's diverse geography gives rise to dozens of ecosystems, each of which has its own native plants and animals. California is a huge state, the third largest in the U.S., and ranges broadly in habitats.

Earth scientists typically divide California into eleven distinct geomorphic provinces with clearly defined boundaries. They are, from north to south, the Klamath Mountains, the Cascade Range, the Modoc Plateau, the Basin and Range, the Coast Ranges, the Central Valley, the Sierra Nevada, the Transverse Ranges, the Mojave Desert, the Peninsular Ranges, and the Colorado Desert. Here, the Los Angeles Basin, the Channel Islands, and the Pacific Ocean are treated as distinct regions.

Common animals that live throughout all the state include raccoons, weasels, otters, beavers, hawks, lizards, owls, coyotes, skunks, snakes, cougars, black bears, deer, squirrels, and whales. As of 2024, there are 687 bird species listed by the California Birds Records Committee, 16 of which are introduced, not native to the state. The California quail, the official state bird, breeds mainly in shrubby areas and open woodland. Another bird which winters in California is the American white pelican which is a large seabird, with a wingspan reaching up to 9 feet 2 inches (280 cm).

Venomous spiders in California include Arizona recluse, Chilean recluse, desert recluse, brown widow, and western black widow.

== Northern California ==
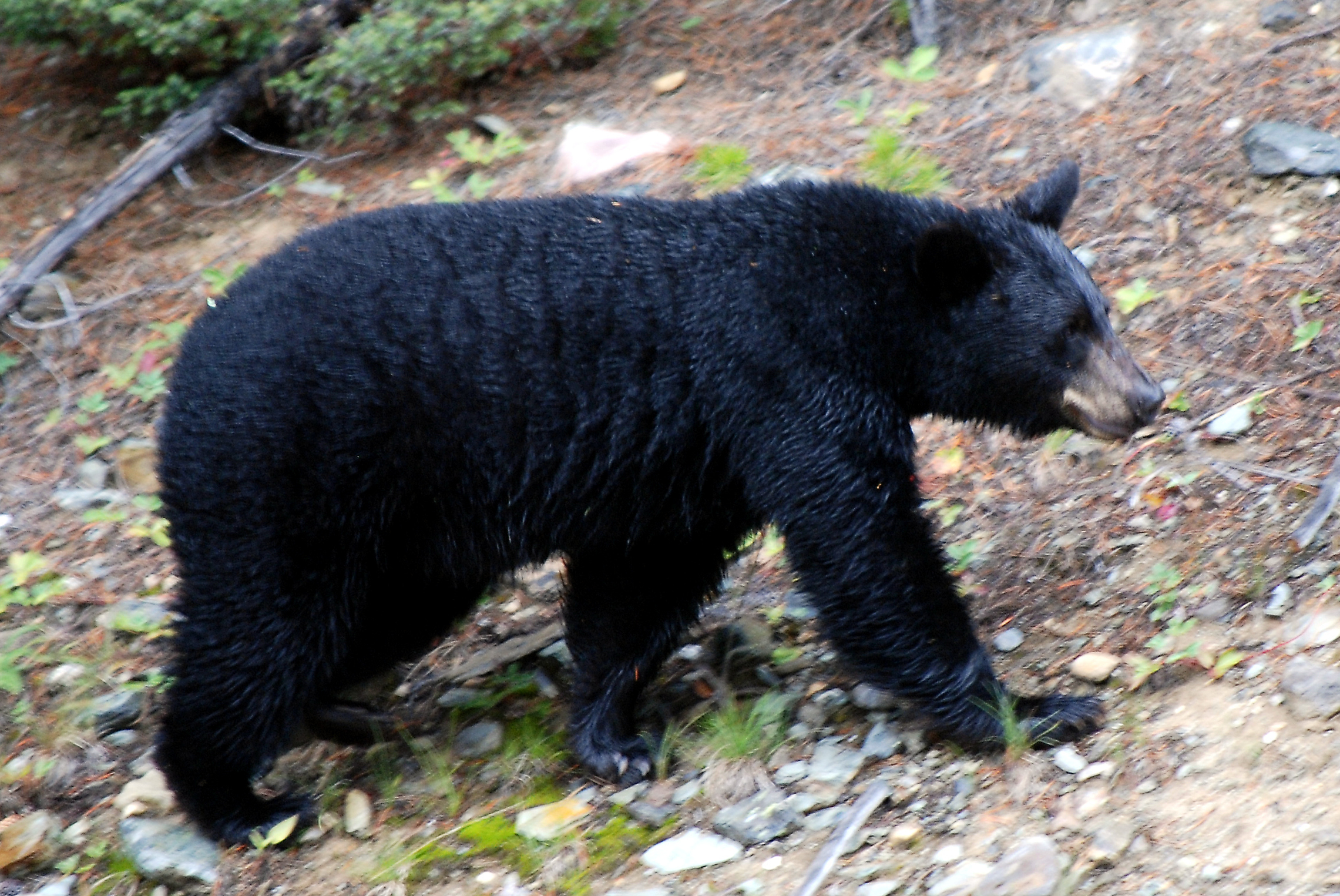
The forests of Northern California are home to many animals, for instance the American black bear. There are between 25,000 and 35,000 black bears in the state.

The forests in northern parts of California have an abundant fauna, which includes for instance the black-tailed deer, black bear, gray fox, North American cougar, bobcat, and Roosevelt elk. Garter snakes and rattlesnakes are common, as are such amphibians as the mudpuppy and redwood salamander. The kingfisher, chickadee, towhee, and hummingbird represent the bird life of this region. There were an estimated 1,750 wild horses in Northern California in 2013, according to the Bureau of Land Management. Gray wolves began repopulating California in 2011 as they entered Lassen, Siskiyou, and Plumas counties from the Cascade Range of Oregon.

=== Sierra Nevada ===
Mammals of the Canadian zone include the snowshoe hare and several species of chipmunk. Conspicuous birds include the blue-fronted jay, hermit thrush, American dipper, and Townsend's solitaire. Birds become scarcer as one ascends to the Hudsonian zone, and the wolverine is now regarded as rare. The only bird native to the high Arctic region is the gray-crowned rosy finch, but others often visit, including Anna's hummingbird and Clark's nutcracker.

Principal mammals of this region are also visitors from other zones; the Sierra coney and white-tailed jackrabbit make their homes here. The bighorn sheep also lives in this mountainous terrain; the bighorn sheep was listed as endangered by the US Fish and Wildlife Service. Some animals in the Yosemite Valley include bobcats, mountain lions, ring-tailed cats, the Steller's jay, California ground squirrels, and the American black bear.

==== Lake Tahoe ====
The largest lake in California by volume is Lake Tahoe, located on the California–Nevada border. The area in and around Lake Tahoe is filled with a huge diversity of animals and plants. Mammals included are the yellow-bellied marmot, the Douglas squirrel or chickaree, golden-mantled ground squirrel, American marten, mule deer, black bear, coyote, raccoon, beaver, and porcupine.

Birds in the region include American robin, bald eagle, California gull, Canada goose, dark-eyed junco, hairy woodpecker, mallard, mountain chickadee, red-tailed hawk, Steller's jay, western tanager, and yellow-headed blackbird. The region has numerous venomous spiders, such as the black widow, brown recluse, tarantula, and hobo spider. The mountain yellow-legged frog also lives throughout the area. Fish species in the lake include Tahoe sucker, mountain whitefish, brown bullhead catfish, smallmouth bass, mosquitofish, and brown trout.

=== Klamath Mountains ===
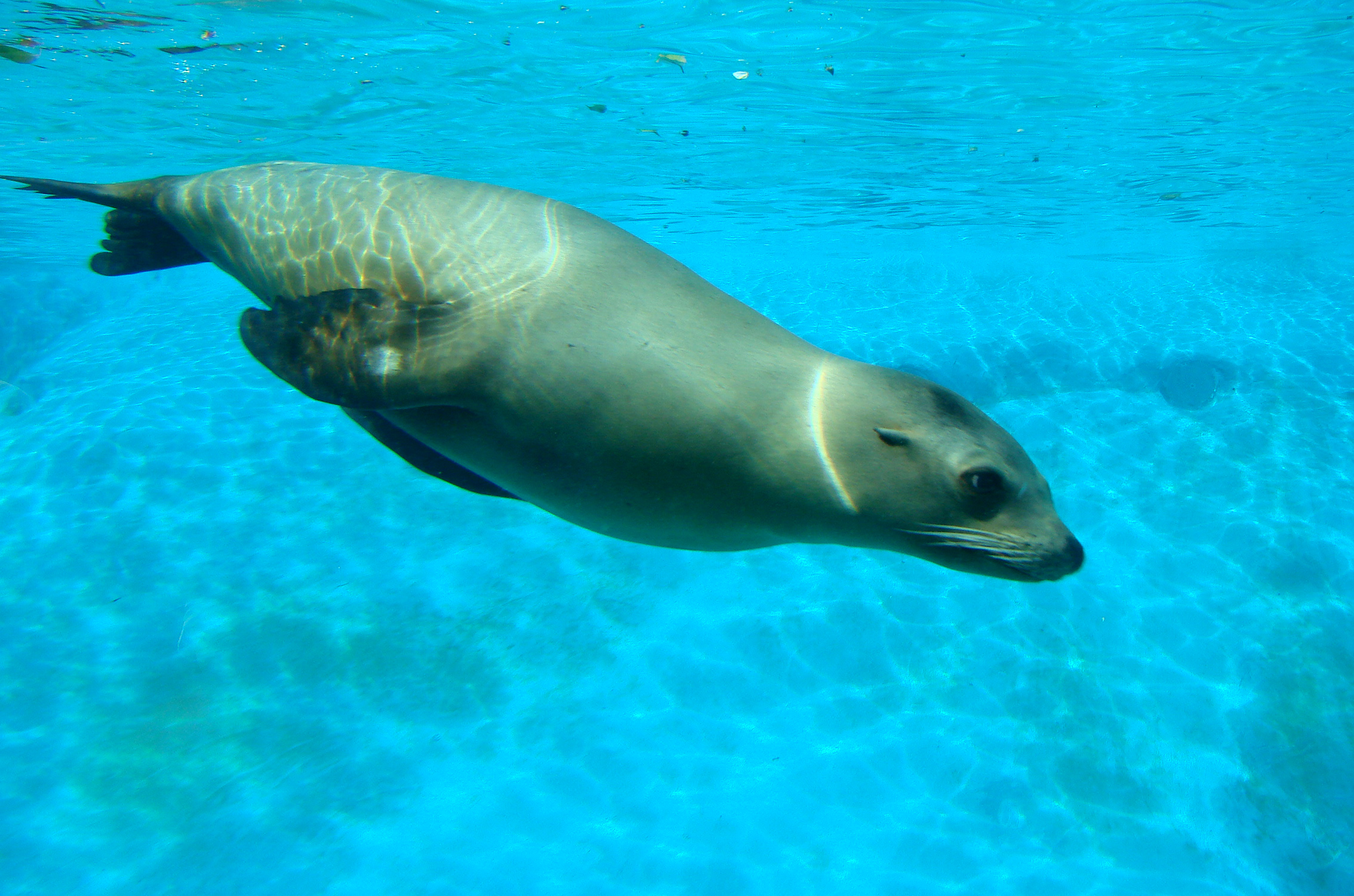
The California sea lion ranges along the western coast and islands of California.

The vast forested Klamath Mountains in Northern California, coupled with a low rate of human settlement in the rugged remote terrain, makes for excellent habitat for a number of species. Mammal species include mountain lions, black bears, bobcats, lynx, raccoons, martens, fishers, beavers, grey fox, red fox, northern flying squirrel, and plentiful deer. Bird species include bald eagles, golden eagles, pileated woodpecker, band-tailed pigeon, several hawks including goshawks, several large owl species including the spotted owl.

The area has wolves. The 517,000-acre Trinity Alps Wilderness is the second largest designated wilderness in California and spans three national forest boundaries. Bears are very common, and it is recommended that hikers use bear bags or canisters. Salmon and steelhead runs occur in a number of rivers whose headwaters lie in the wilderness, including the Stuart Fork Trinity River, South Fork Salmon River, North Fork Trinity River, and New River. Other fish species include king salmon, silver salmon, brown trout, rainbow trout, kokanee salmon, eastern brook trout, crappie, bluegill, catfish, large, and smallmouth bass.

=== Big Sur ===
Big Sur is a region of the Central Coast of California where the Santa Lucia Mountains rise abruptly from the Pacific Ocean. Big Sur is home to a wide variety of animals. Mammals include bobcat, weasel, coyote, gray fox, and puma, as well as non-native Russian boar which were imported in the 1920s for sport hunting to Rancho San Carlos and can now be found in 56 of the state's 58 counties. Sea lions, harbor seals, elephant seals, gray whales, sea otters, and several species of sharks can be spotted off the rocky coastline.

Many varieties of seabirds and waterfowl also call it home, including seagulls, cormorants, willets, sandpipers, oystercatchers, guillemots, and many others. Andrew Molera State Park has over 350 species of birds. The peregrine falcon, brown pelican, Brandt's cormorant, and other seabirds are very easy to see along the coast. Three amphibians are found in the area: arboreal salamander, California newt, and western toad.

== Southern California ==
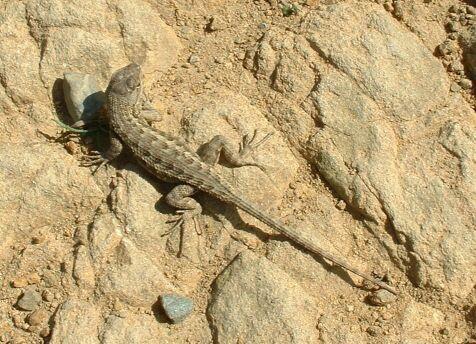
California is home to dozens of species of lizards. The western fence lizard (depicted) is the most common in Southern California.

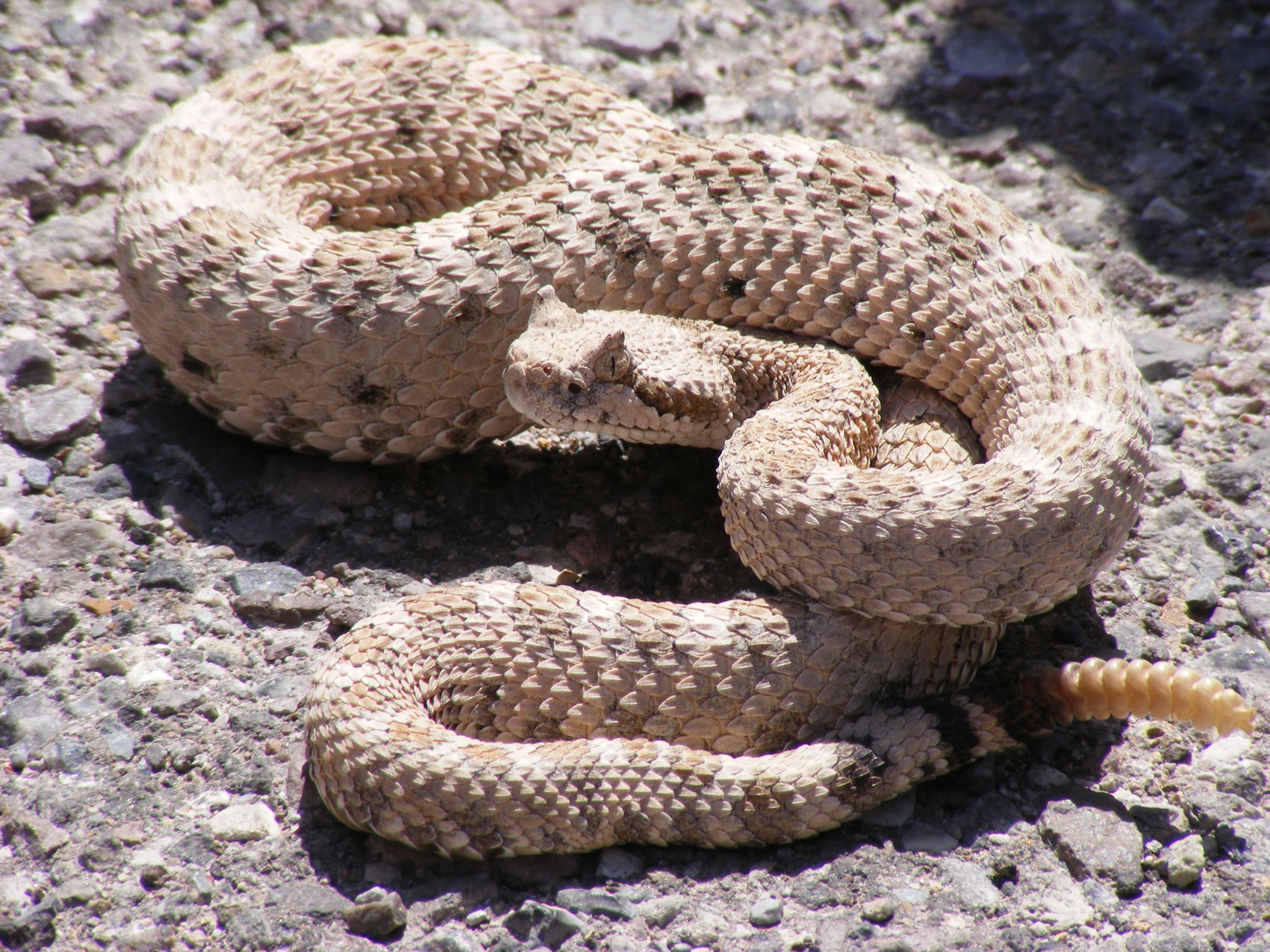
The Sonoran Desert has eleven species of rattlesnakes, more than anywhere else in the world.

Southern California constitutes one of the more varied collections of geologic, topographic, and natural ecosystem landscapes in a diversity outnumbering other major regions in the country. The region spans from Pacific Channel Islands, shorelines, beaches, and coastal plains, through the Transverse and Peninsular Ranges with their peaks, into the large and small interior valleys, to the vast deserts of California.

Several varieties of rattlesnakes are indigenous to the region. While only the Pacific Northwest rattler makes its home in Northern California, almost a dozen rattlesnakes make their home in the deserts of Southern California, including the western diamondback and Mojave rattlesnake. Birds in the region include Anna's hummingbird, acorn woodpecker, northern flicker, California towhee, California vulture, red-tailed hawk, and many more.

=== Mojave Desert ===
The Mojave Desert appears to have little in the way of wildlife but actually has large, diverse populations. The extremely warm desert environment has animals that have adapted to their environment with each filling an important niche in the desert ecosystem. Animals in the Mojave Desert include the Mohave rattlesnake, desert tortoise, glossy snake, common side-blotched lizard, California kingsnake, giant hairy scorpion, stripe tailed scorpion, and the desert iguana.

=== Sonoran Desert ===
Mammals found in the deserts of the lower Sonoran zone include the jackrabbit, kangaroo rat, and opossum. The western screech owl, roadrunner, cactus wren, and various species of hawk are common birds, and the sidewinder, desert tortoise, and horned toad represent the area's reptilian life. The upper Sonoran zone is home to such mammals as the antelope, brown-footed woodrat, and ring-tailed cat. Birds distinctive to this zone are the California thrasher, the American bushtit, and California condor.

=== Colorado River ===
The Colorado River is the longest river in California. Many animals have made the Colorado River and surrounding valley their home. Animals along the river include several species of snakes, scorpions, tarantula, yellow-headed blackbird, desert iguana, kit fox, bobcats, and coyotes. Rivers and streams in the Colorado Basin were once home to 49 species of native fish, of which 42 are endemic.

Engineering projects and river regulation have led to the extinction of four species and severe declines in the populations of 40 species. The bonytail chub, razorback sucker, Colorado pikeminnow, and humpback chub are among those considered the most at risk. All are unique to the Colorado River system and well adapted to the river's natural silty conditions and flow variations.

=== Californian Coast ===
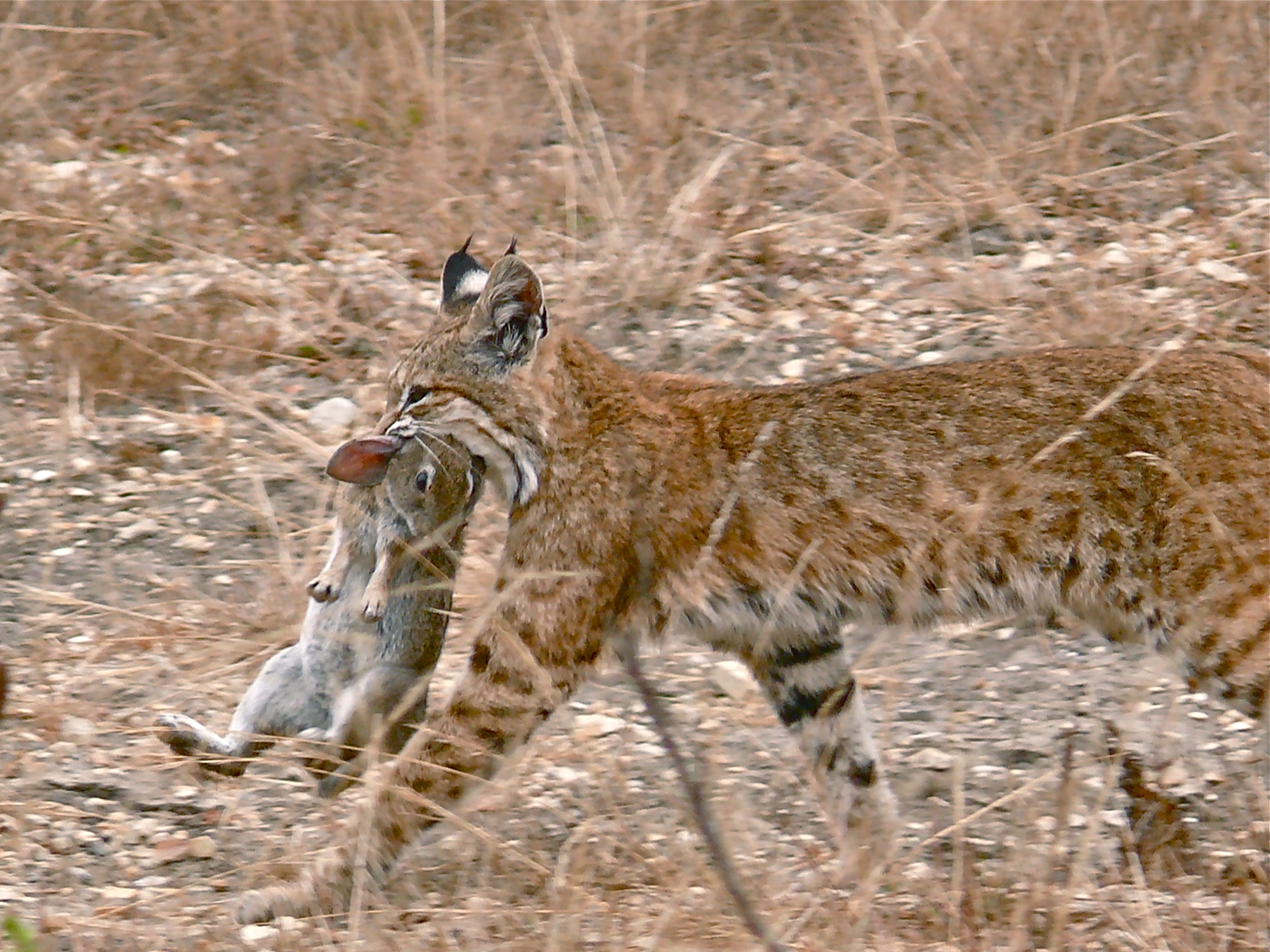
Bobcat with a rabbit, Montaña de Oro State Park.

On the Californian Coast, many species of animals and plants can be found. The raccoon, skunk, opossum, and rat are 4 of the species. Large predators include the red fox, bobcat, coyote, American black bear, and the cougar. Wasps, the European honeybee, yellowjackets, flies, moths, and many other insects also live on the Californian Coast. Marine life includes orcas and great white sharks. The gray fox is more common than its red cousin.

==== Backyard wildlife ====
Raccoons, opossums, skunks, and foxes are common in yards, along with insects, birds, lizards, and squirrels. Bobcats may appear near the wild-land borders, along with rattlesnakes, coyotes, cougars, and bears.

=== Channel Islands ===
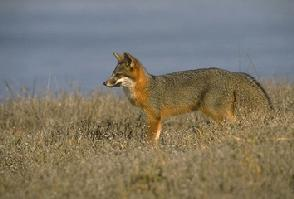
The Channel Island fox is native to six of the eight Channel Islands of California. There are six subspecies of the fox, each unique to the island it lives on.

More than 2000 species of plants and animals can be found within the Channel Islands National Park, which consists of five of the eight islands that compromise the Channel Islands. Three mammals are endemic to the archipelago: the Channel Islands fox, the deer mouse, and the Channel Islands spotted skunk. Introduced mammal species include feral pigs, cats, rats, deer, cattle, the Santa Cruz sheep, and the Catalina Island bison herd.

Other mammals include the western harvest mouse, the ground squirrel, and the ornate shrew. Other animals in the islands include island fence lizard, island scrub jay, harbor seal, California sea lion, island night lizard, barn owl, bald eagles, American kestrel, horned lark, meadowlark, and California brown pelican. One hundred and forty-five of these species are found in the islands and nowhere else in the world. Marine life ranges from microscopic plankton to the endangered blue whale, the largest animal ever to live on earth. The oceans surrounding the islands have rich marine life; species include orcas, swellshark, bat ray, California moray, great white shark, and sea lions.

== Coastal California ==
Dolphins by Anacapa Island

Along the coast of California is the California sea lion, which can grow up to seven feet long and can be found in shallow ocean water, near beaches, and among rocks. In the open ocean is the northern elephant seal, which grows up to a massive 14 feet (4.3 metres) and has a population of just over 150,000. The ocean off California is home to six species of seals: Guadalupe fur seal, northern fur seal, northern sea lion, California sea lion, northern elephant seal, and harbor seal.

California waters are also home to eleven species of dolphins, including the short-beaked common dolphin and the Pacific white-sided dolphin. A dozen species of whales live in California, including the killer whale and the gray whale. At least 34 species of sharks have been recorded off the California coast, including great whites and tiger sharks.

== See also ==
- List of amphibians of California
- List of birds of California
- List of freshwater fish in California
- List of mammals of California
- List of reptiles of California
- California Floristic Province
- List of California native plants
- Fauna of the United States
