= Golden Trout Creek =

Tributary of the Kern River

Coordinates: 36°21′01″N 118°24′16″W

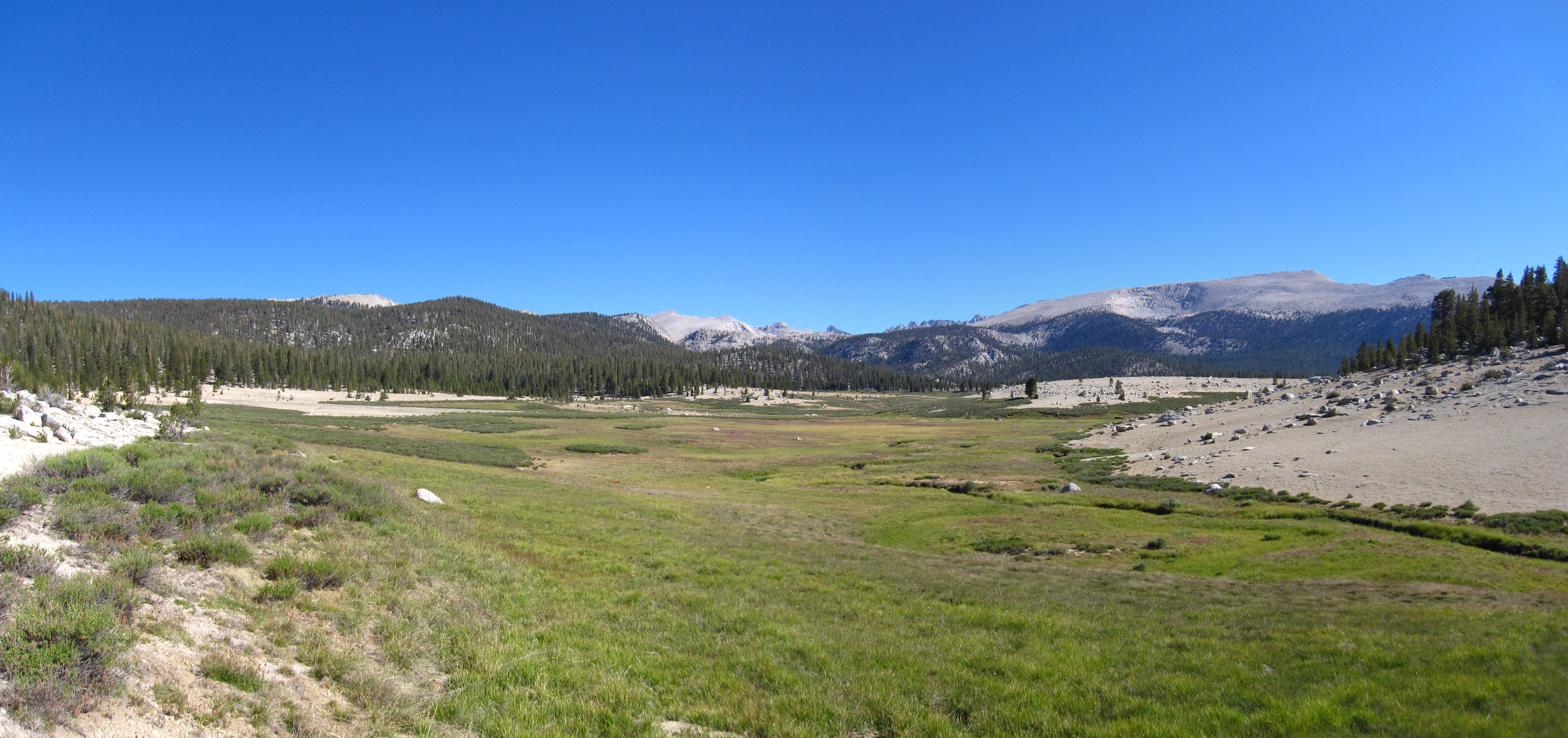
Big Whitney Meadow, the source of Golden Trout Creek

Golden Trout Creek is an approximately 9-mile (14 km) long tributary of the Kern River, flowing in northeastern Tulare County, California.

The creek drains an area of the High Sierra Nevada in the Inyo National Forest. Volcano Creek is a tributary of it.

== Course ==
It starts near 12,900-foot (3,900 m) Cirque Peak and Siberian Pass as the confluence of several small streams in Big Whitney Meadow and flows south, turning west at the confluence of the South Fork. From there, it flows through the Golden Trout Creek Volcanic Field at Little Whitney Meadow and joins the Kern River in Kern Canyon, about 40 mi (64 km) north of Lake Isabella.

== Ecology ==
California's state fish, the Golden trout, are native to Golden Trout Creek. The high Volcano Falls located near the mouth of the creek prevents other trout species from the main Kern River from mixing with those in this creek.

== See also ==
- Golden Trout Wilderness Area
- Kern River rainbow trout
