= Golden Trout Wilderness =

Protected wilderness area in California, United States

- IUCN category Ib (wilderness area)
- Lookout from the Jordan Trail

- Location within California Location within the United States
- Interactive map of Golden Trout Wilderness
- Location: Southern Sierra Nevada Mountains, Tulare County / Inyo County, California, United States
- Nearest city: Porterville, California
- Coordinates: 36°18′0″N 118°19′19″W
- Area: 303,511 acres (1,228.3 km^{2})
- Established: 1978
- Governing body: USDA / U.S. Forest Service

The Golden Trout Wilderness is a federally designated wilderness area in the Sierra Nevada, in Tulare County and Inyo County, California. It is located 40 miles (64 km) east of Porterville within Inyo National Forest and Sequoia National Forest.

It is 303,511 acres (1,228.3 km^{2}) in size and was created by the US Congress in 1978 as part of the National Wilderness Preservation System. The wilderness is managed by the U.S. Forest Service.

The wilderness is named for and protects the habitat of California's state freshwater fish, the golden trout.

Elevations range from about 680 feet (210 m) to 12,900 feet (3,900 m).

Within the wilderness are portions of the Kern Plateau, the Great Western Divide's southern extension, and the main stem of the Kern River, the South Fork of the Kern and the Little Kern River.

The wilderness area is bordered on the northeast and northwest by the high peaks of the southern Sierra Nevada. Cirque Peak is the high point at 12,894 feet (3,930 m).

== Kern Plateau ==
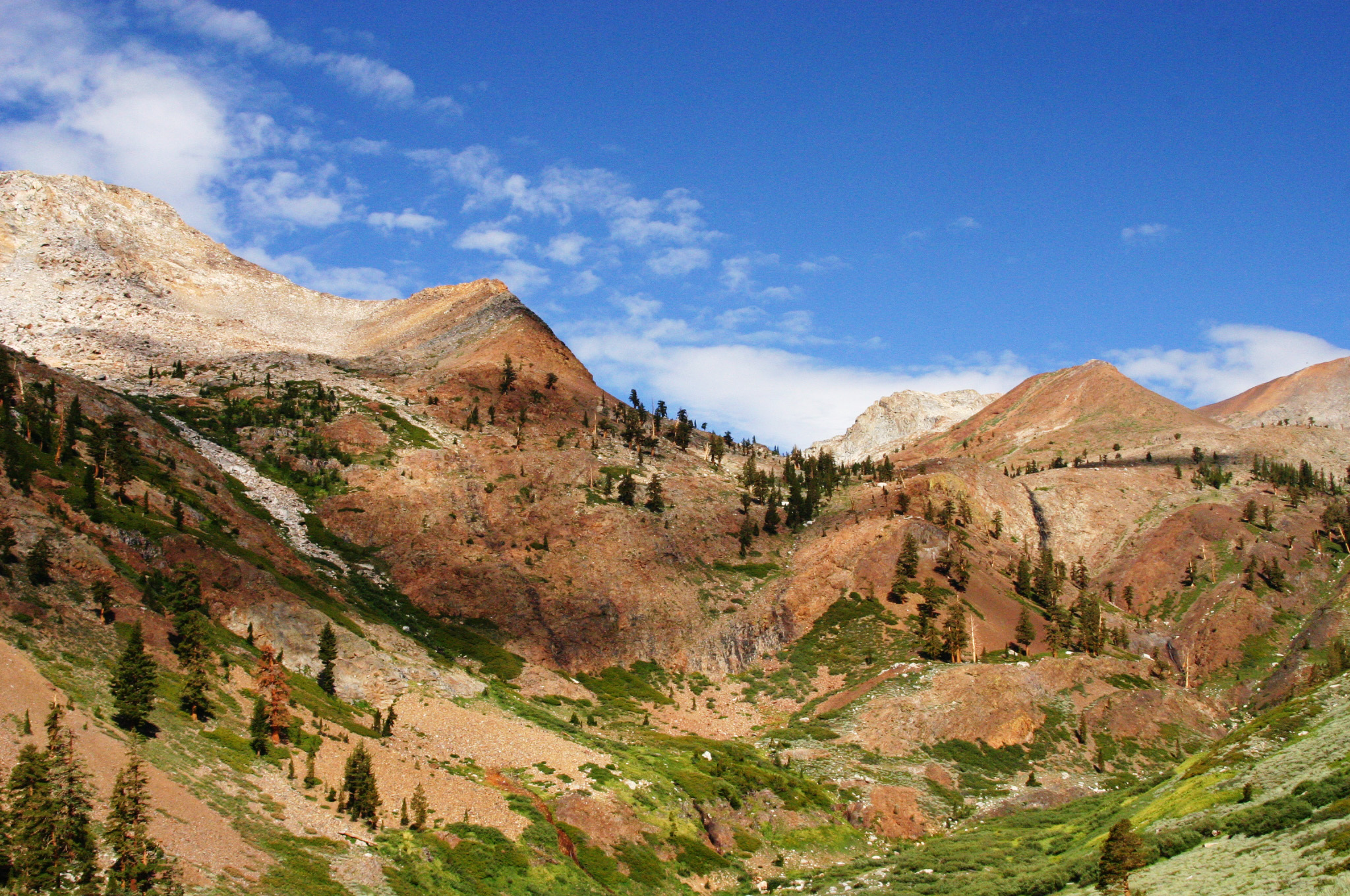
Golden Trout Wilderness, one day after a rainstorm, just south of Farewell Gap

The Kern Plateau is a large tableland with sprawling meadows, narrow grasslands along streams, and forested ridges and flats. The centerpiece of the plateau is Kern Peak (11,443 ft) which has far-reaching vistas of the middle and upper Kern River drainage and much of the far southern Sierra, including Olancha Peak, the southern Kaweah Range, the mountains of the Mineral King area, and the Dome Land Wilderness of the far southern Sierra.

Located in both Sequoia and Inyo national forests, this 500,000-acre (2,000 km^{2}) plateau had been the center of a battle between preservationists and multiple-use advocates. Before 1947, there was little incentive to develop the area, but that changed with the Secretary of Agriculture's plan to manage the area along multiple-use guidelines due to its proximity to population centers. In addition, there was an epidemic of insect damage in the commercial timber, which was estimated at 30 million board feet. A growing market for lumber added more pressure to develop the area and in 1956, a multiple-use management plan was completed that included a timber sale on the plateau.

Wilderness advocates wanted to preserve the plateau, and opposed the Forest Service plan at public meetings. But, because no new facts were presented, the Forest Service went ahead with the timber sale which included building an access road. The sale contract contained special provisions to assure that the timber operators recognized them as they logged. A second road was constructed despite strong opposition from the Sierra Club, The Wilderness Society and the Kern Plateau Association.

The Kern Plateau controversy in the 1950s deepened the chasm between the Forest Service and wilderness proponents. According to former Regional Forester Doug Leisz, "The Kern Plateau use controversy was the beginning of the preservationists vs. use fight which has since touched public lands over the entire country", although an argument can be made that the battle over the Hetch Hetchy Valley with John Muir was the beginning.

== Wildlife ==
Wildlife includes the large Monache deer herd, the sensitive Sierra Nevada red fox, pine martens, cougars, and black bears.

== California state fish ==
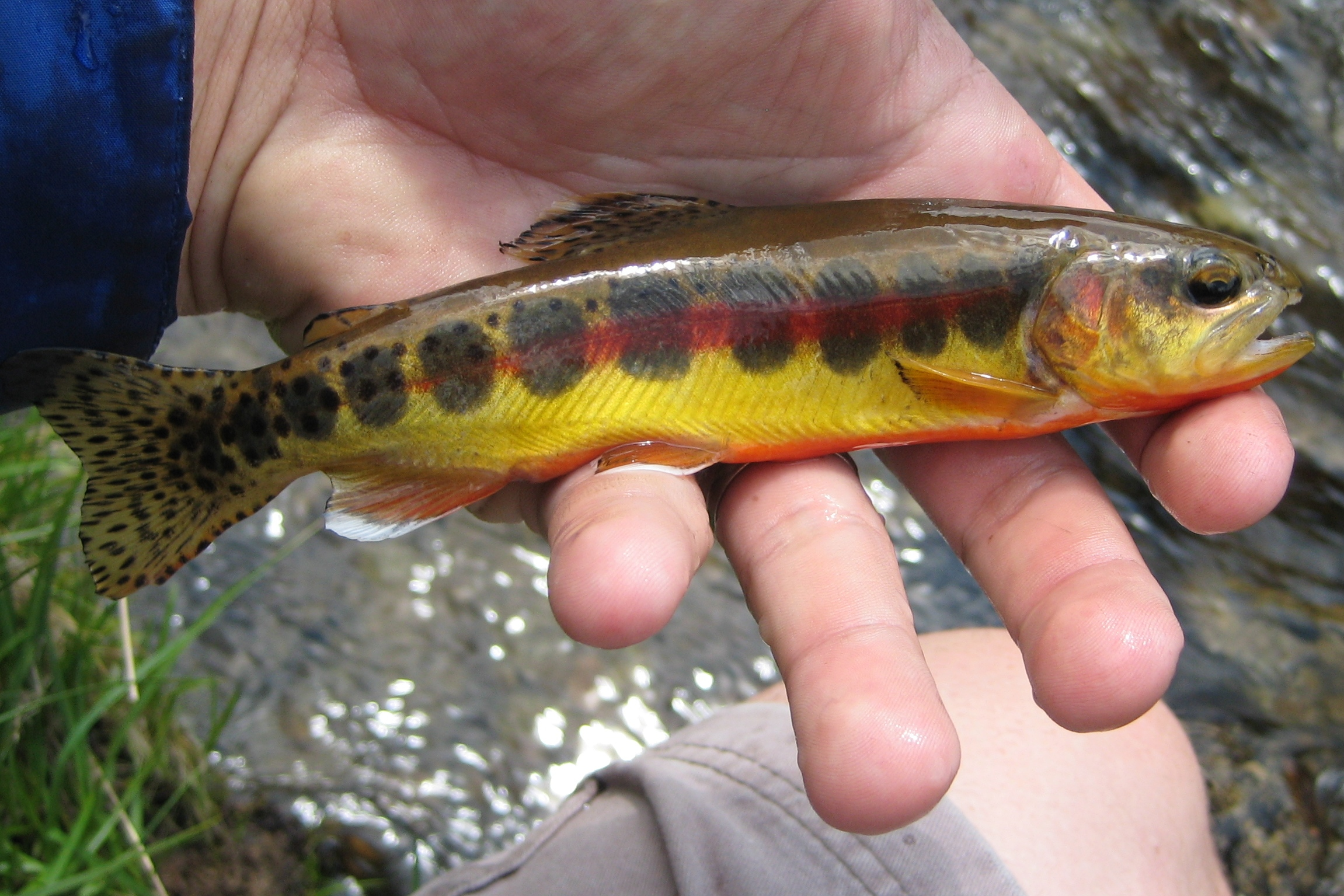
The golden trout

The golden trout is California's state fish. The golden trout is closely related to two other rainbow trout subspecies found in this wilderness: the Little Kern golden trout (O. m. whitei), found in the Little Kern River basin, and the Kern River rainbow trout (O. m. gilberti), found in the Kern River system. Together, these three trout form what is sometimes referred to as the "Golden Trout Complex". The Little Kern golden trout is listed as threatened under the Endangered Species Act.

== Recreation and restrictions ==
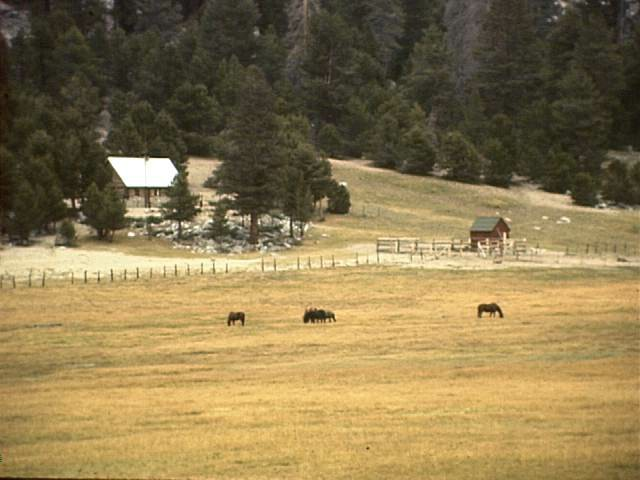
Casa Vieja Guard Station, at Casa Vieja Meadows, Mount Whitney Ranger District, circa 1976. Built in 1959.

Recreational activities include backpacking, horseback riding, swimming, day hiking, fishing, hunting, rock climbing, mountaineering, skiing, snowshoeing, and off-roading.

There are 379 miles (610 km) of trail including the Pacific Crest Trail (PCT), which stays above 10,000 feet (3,000 m) elevation for most of the 25-mile (40 km) route through the Golden Trout Wilderness. There are historical sites, such as the Tunnel Meadow and Casa Vieja guard stations, and the 12-mile trail to Jordan Hot Springs along Ninemile Creek. The trail was built in 1861 by John Jordan for access to Olancha from Visalia. Past volcanic activity created the hot springs as well as Groundhog Cone and the Golden Trout Volcanic Field.

Permits are required for all overnight use and there is a quota in effect for the Cottonwood Pass Trailhead.

Other restrictions include a ban on wood-fueled fires along the PCT between Cottonwood Pass to the Sequoia-Kings Canyon Wilderness and also at the Rocky Basin Lake area.

== See also ==
- Mount Whitney Fish Hatchery
- List of wilderness areas in California
- Silver Knapsack Trail
