= Little Kern River =

- Location of the Little Kern River in California

Location
- Country: United States
- State: California

Physical characteristics
- Source: Great Western Divide
  - location: Sequoia National Forest
  - coordinates: 36°23′57″N 118°34′19″W
  - elevation: 10,603 ft (3,232 m)
- Mouth: Kern River
  - location: Forks of the Kern
  - coordinates: 36°08′00″N 118°26′20″W
  - elevation: 4,790 ft (1,460 m)
- Length: 24.4 mi (39.3 km)
- Basin size: 133 sq mi (340 km^{2})
- Discharge
  - location: Quaking Aspen Camp
  - average: 131 cu ft/s (3.7 m^{3}/s)
  - minimum: 7.12 cu ft/s (0.202 m^{3}/s)
  - maximum: 13,100 cu ft/s (370 m^{3}/s)

The Little Kern River is a 24.4-mile-long (39.3 km) major tributary of the upper Kern River in the Sequoia National Forest, in the southern Sierra Nevada, California. It is one of three streams, along with Volcano Creek and Golden Trout Creek, that harbor golden trout (Oncorhynchus mykiss aguabonita).

== Watershed and Course ==
The Little Kern River drains approximately 133 square miles (340 km^{2}) of wilderness, all of it in Tulare County.

The Little Kern begins at Bullfrog Lakes, in the Golden Trout Wilderness south of Farewell Gap near Mineral King. It flows south, past Table Meadow and Burnt Corral Meadows, then enters a deep gorge before it joins with the Kern River at Forks of the Kern. The Little Kern roughly defines the southwest boundary of the Great Western Divide; the confluence with the main Kern (which flows to the east of the range) marks the southernmost tip of the range. Forks of the Kern is located about 40 miles (64 km) upstream of Lake Isabella.

== Ecology ==
Major efforts were made since the 1960s to create refuge areas for golden trout in the upper reaches of the South Fork Kern River. Three barriers were built (Ramshaw, Templeton, and Schaeffer) and a piscicide was applied to the river to kill all non-native fish above or between these barriers. From 1969 through 2000, 10 chemical treatments were performed, with varying degrees of success.
