= Golden trout =

Conservation status
- Critically Imperiled (NatureServe)

Scientific classification
- Kingdom: Animalia
- Phylum: Chordata
- Class: Actinopterygii
- Division: Teleostei
- Order: Salmoniformes
- Family: Salmonidae
- Genus: Oncorhynchus
- Species: O. aguabonita

Binomial name
- Oncorhynchus aguabonita (Jordan, 1892)
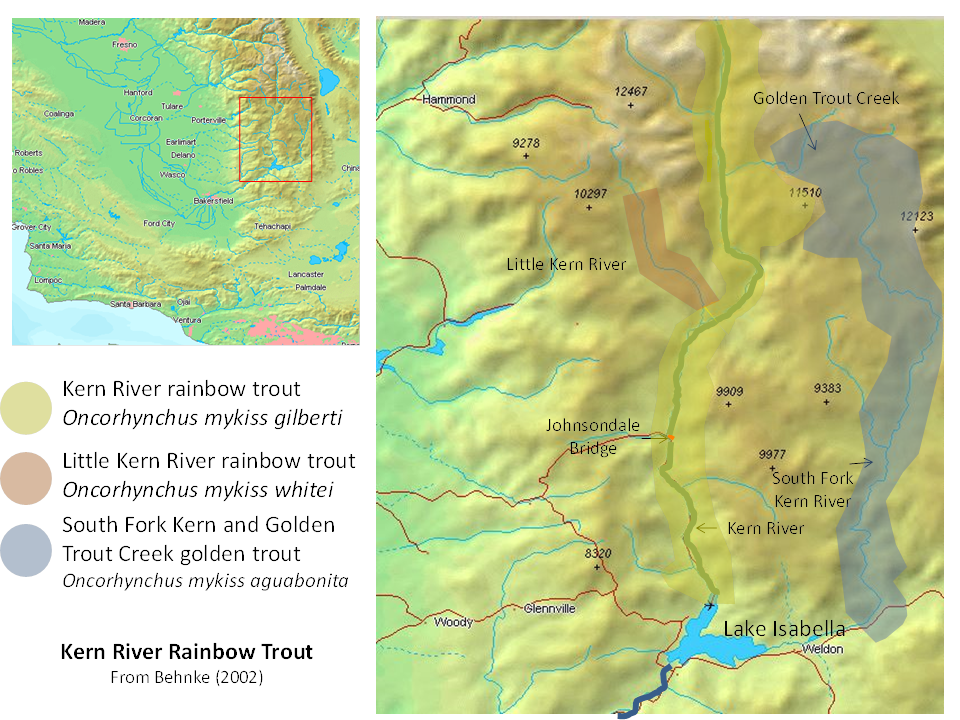
- Kern River trout range map

Synonyms
- Oncorhynchus mykiss aguabonita

Species of fish

The California golden trout (Oncorhynchus aguabonita) is a species of trout native to California. The golden trout is normally found in the Golden Trout Creek (tributary to the Kern River), Volcano Creek (tributary to Golden Trout Creek), and the South Fork Kern River. The Golden trout has been the official freshwater state fish of California since 1947.

The California golden trout is closely related to two rainbow trout subspecies. The Little Kern golden trout (O. m. whitei), found in the Little Kern River basin, and the Kern River rainbow trout (O. m. gilberti), found in the Kern River system. Together, these three trout form what is sometimes referred to as the "golden trout complex".

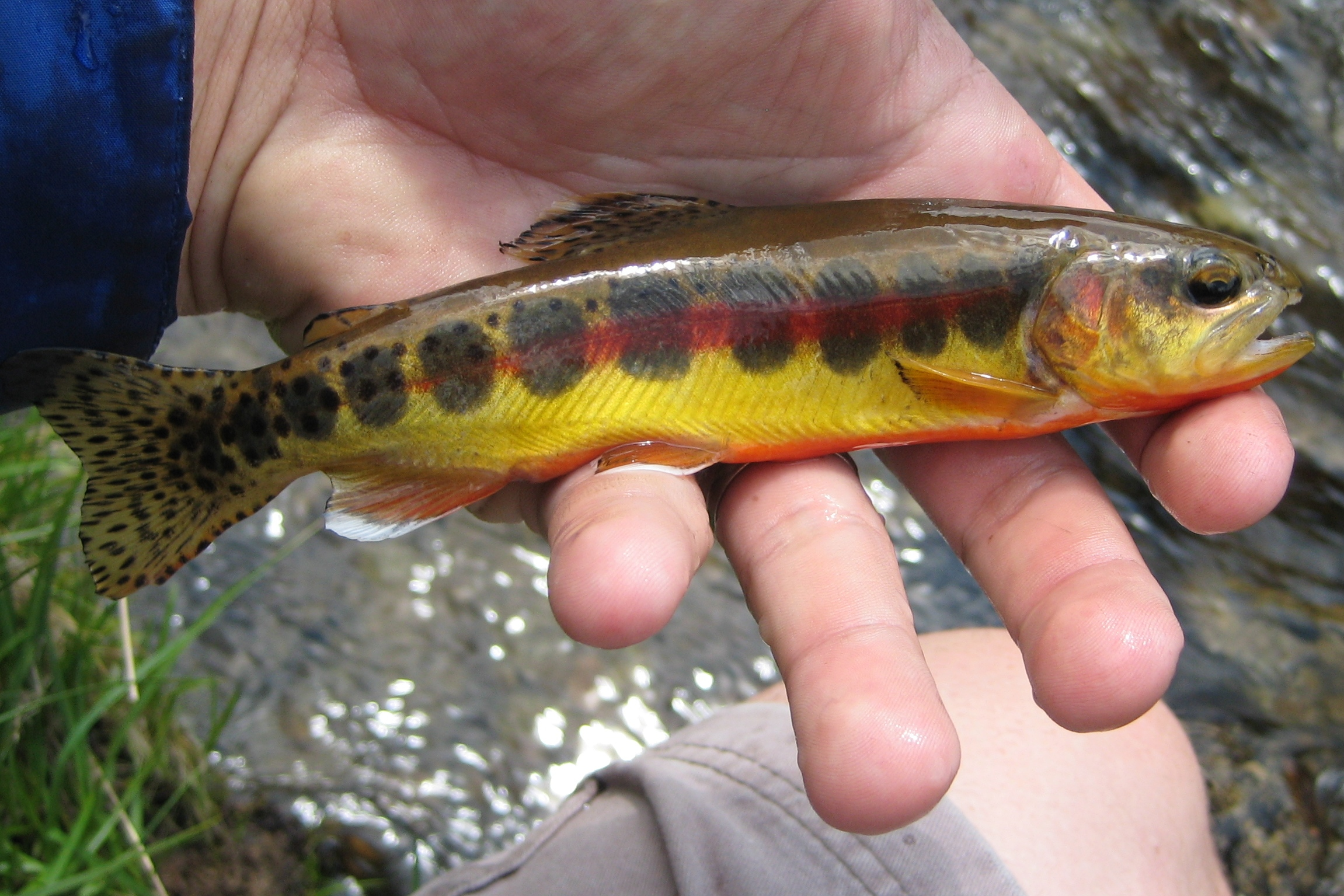
Golden trout from within the John Muir Wilderness

Golden trout caught in a high mountain lake of the Wind River Range

== Taxonomy ==
Originally the golden trout was described as a subspecies of the salmon species, with a name Salmo mykiss agua-bonita, and it is still often considered a subspecies (now called Oncorhynchus mykiss aguabonita) along with several other rainbow trout subspecies commonly known as redband trout.

FishBase and the Catalog of Fishes however now (2014) list O. aguabonita as an independent species rather than as a subspecies of O. mykiss. Likewise, while ITIS lists O. m. whitei and O. m. gilberti as subspecies of O. mykiss, O. aguabonita instead is listed as a full species.

== Description ==
The golden trout has golden flanks with red, horizontal bands along the lateral lines on each side and about 10 dark, vertical, oval marks (called "parr marks") on each side. Dorsal, lateral and anal fins have white leading edges. In their native habitat, adults range from 6 to 12 inches (15 to 30 cm) long. Fish over 12 inches (30 cm) are considered large. Golden trout that have been transplanted to lakes have been recorded up to 11 pounds (5.0 kg).

The Golden Trout should be distinguished from the similarly named Golden Rainbow Trout, also known as the Lightning Trout, an informal name given to eliminate confusion between the two species. The Golden Rainbow Trou is a genetic mutation color variant of the Rainbow Trout and often confused with the Palomino Trout. The two often get used interchangeably but are very different in appearance. The Golden Rainbow is very vibrant Yellow and Orange in color. The Palomino Trout is a washed out pale Yellow color. The Golden Rainbow Trout is a creation of breeding a Golden Rainbow Trout with another Golden Rainbow Trout. A Palomino Trout is a creation of breeding a Golden Rainbow Trout with a regular colored Rainbow Trout. Palomino Trout were first introduced in Pennsylvania via the Pennsylvania Fish and Boat Commission's State Stocking Program and were stocked in PA waters from 1967 to 1969. From 1970 forward, Pennsylvania began stocking the more vibrant pure strain of Golden Rainbow Trout.

The golden trout is commonly found at elevations from 6,890 feet (2,100 m) to 10,000 feet (3,000 m) above sea level, and is native to California's southern Sierra Nevada mountains. Outside of its native range in California, golden trout are more often found in cirques and creeks in wilderness areas around 10,500–12,000 feet (3,200–3,700 m) elevation, often in higher passes that are not passable without crampons, ice axes, and ropes until after the Fourth of July. Their preferred water temperature is 58 to 62 °F (14 to 17 °C) but they can tolerate temperatures in degraded streams on the Kern Plateau as high as 70 °F (21 °C) so long as those waters cool during the night. The only other species of fish indigenous to the native range of California golden trout is the Sacramento sucker (Catostomus occidentalis occidentalis).

=== Record catches ===
The Wyoming Game & Fish Department state record golden trout measured 28 in (71 cm) and weighed 11 lb 4 oz (5.1 kg), caught in Cooks Lake, Wyoming in 1948. The IGFA "All-Tackle Length Record" for O. aguabonita measured 21 in (53 cm) caught in Golden Lake, Wyoming in 2012.

== Distribution ==
O. m. aguabonita is native to the southern Sierra Nevada, including the upper reach and tributaries of the South Fork of the Kern River, and Golden Trout Creek and its tributaries. It has been introduced in hundreds of lakes and streams outside the native range, though most of these populations did not last or hybridized with cutthroat trout and other subspecies of rainbow trout.

== History ==
In 1892, the California golden trout was originally described by David Starr Jordan, the first President of Stanford University, as Salmo mykiss agua-bonita. The fish was named after the Agua Bonita Waterfall where the first specimens were collected, at the mouth of Volcano Creek, at the creek's confluence with the Kern River. A century later they were listed as Oncorhynchus mykiss aguabonita in Behnke's Native trout of western North America.

In 1904, Stewart Edward White communicated to his friend President Theodore Roosevelt, that overfishing could lead to extinction of the golden trout. In White's novel The Mountains, he wrote about the threatened golden trout on California's Kern Plateau. Roosevelt shared White's concern and, through U.S. Fish Commissioner George M. Bowers, dispatched biologist Barton Warren Evermann of the U.S. Bureau of Fisheries to study the situation. In 1906 Evermann published The Golden Trout of the Southern High Sierras. Based on morphology, Evermann accurately described four forms of this native fish: Salmo roosevelti from Golden Trout (Volcano) Creek, Salmo aguabonita from nearby South Fork of the Kern River, Salmo whitei (named in recognition of Stewart Edward White) from the Little Kern River, and Salmo gilberti, the Kern River rainbow.

Genetic studies have since clarified three groups of trout native to the Kern River: California golden trout (O. m. aguabonita) native to the South Fork Kern River and Golden Trout Creek (tributary to the Kern River mainstem but the historic course of the South Fork Kern River and now only separated from it by a lava flow and ridge of sediment), Little Kern River golden trout (O. m. whitei), and Kern River rainbow trout (O. m. gilberti).

== Conservation ==
Years of overexploitation, mismanagement and competition with exotic species have brought golden trout to the brink of being designated as "threatened". Introduced brook trout (Salvelinus fontinalis) outcompete them for food, introduced brown trout (Salmo trutta) prey on them and introduced rainbow trout (O. mykiss) hybridize with them, damaging the native gene pool through introgression. Populations have been in steady decline for decades.

In 1978, the Golden Trout Wilderness was established within Inyo National Forest and Sequoia National Forest, protecting the upper watersheds of the Kern River and South Fork Kern River. It also resulted in the closure of the Tunnel Air Camp airstrip and air charters operations for sport fishermen in the region.

In September 2004, the California Department of Fish and Game signed an agreement with federal agencies to work on restoring back-country habitat, heavily damaged by overgrazing from cattle and sheep, as part of a comprehensive conservation strategy.

The US Endangered Species Act (USESA) designated the subspecies O. m. whitei as LT, or Listed Threatened, since 1978, under the name Oncorhynchus aguabonita whitei.

=== Subspecies designations ===
NatureServe has designated the following NatureServe Conservation Status for the three subspecies:

- Oncorhynchus mykiss aguabonita—Golden trout (G5T1): Critically Imperiled, last reviewed in 2013. The primary threat is hybridization and introgression with stocked rainbow trout. Other threats include competition with non-native brown trout and rainbow trout, predation by brown trout, habitat degradation from cattle grazing, and possibly expanding beaver populations in the native range. Genetic studies showed hybridization with stocked rainbow trout in almost all known wild populations analyzed to as of 2003. Non-hybridized populations are restricted to less than 1% of their native range, and confinement to these areas for long periods create a significant risk of inbreeding depression, and loss of heterozygosity and genetic variance.
- Oncorhynchus mykiss gilberti—Kern River rainbow trout (G5T1Q): Critically Imperiled, with questionable taxonomy that may reduce conservation priority, last reviewed in 2005. Few if any genetically pure populations still exist. Primary threats include continued introgression with introduced rainbow trout, habitat loss from grazing, logging and road building, unpredictable events such as floods, drought, and fire (and subsequent landslides), and reduced habitat availability due to introduced beaver.
- Oncorhynchus mykiss whitei—Little Kern golden trout (G5T2Q): Imperiled, with questionable taxonomy that may reduce conservation priority, last reviewed in 2005. Hybridization with introduced rainbow trout is considered a threat, and "there is a constant threat from introductions of other salmonids by disgruntled anglers." The subspecies still occurs in the Little Kern River, above the falls on the lower river, though some populations show signs of introgression with coastal rainbow trout.

The American Fisheries Society has designated all three subspecies as Threatened since August 2008.

=== Government efforts ===
The golden trout is an endangered species in California. In 1991, the fish was added to the U.S. Fish and Wildlife Service’s list. This is in efforts to protect the species legally and create measures to ensure their survival. The government is allowed to make recovery plans, restrict commercial trade, and purchase habitats.

The areas used for cattle grazing have been decreased and fencing is enforced in certain areas to ensure cows do not enter the stream. Though scientists are still studying the ecosystems, many improvement projects are still developing.

== Population decline ==
The population of golden trout in their original habitat has strongly decreased in recent times. In 1965 there were about 40,000 golden trout. In most recent times there are only 400-2,600 recorded to be within a distance of the Volcano Creek. It is challenging to keep an accurate record of the population because many of them are no longer within their habitats.

The decrease in population size is a reflection of the decrease in habitat size. Originally the total habitat of the golden trout was around 450 square miles (1,200 km^{2}). In recent times, the golden trout is only secure in 20 square miles (52 km^{2}), a dramatic decrease to only about 4% of its original habitat. Moreover, the streams that they inhabit are also decreasing. A survey of Volcanic Creek showed that the stream decreased from 2.1 kilometres (1.3 mi) in 2013, to 1.4 kilometres (0.87 mi) in 2014, to 1 kilometre (0.62 mi) in 2015. The continuous decline in the stream shows the low quality of habitat the Golden trout experiences in recent times.

== Translocations outside of endemic range ==
The golden trout underwent 20th century translocations into many Western states. Established populations remain in California, Idaho, Montana, Utah, Washington, Colorado, and Wyoming. Populations in the high-elevation lakes of the Ruby Mountains, Nevada, have died out. The current status of golden trout in some Western states, including Arizona, New Mexico and Oregon, lacks documentation.

Wyoming maintains a particularly robust population of translocated golden trout. California golden trout eggs were introduced to Wyoming in 1920; since then, the Wyoming Game and Fish Department has stocked nearly 90 high-altitude lakes and streams, primarily by helicopter. The Story Fish Hatchery, located in Banner, Wyoming, houses the world's only genetically pure captive golden trout broodstock. The golden trout program at the Story Fish Hatchery supports golden trout populations in Wyoming and neighboring states, including Colorado, Idaho, and Washington.

New Mexico had a storied population of golden trout. In his autobiography, Chuck Yeager wrote of a scheme to introduce golden trout to New Mexico involving himself, Bud Anderson, and General Irving "Twig" Branch. New Mexico's golden trout populations have since extirpated.

The Rocky Mountains of Alberta, Canada, are home to an introduced, self-sustaining golden trout population. No outside golden trout are brought into Alberta's population; the population is carefully managed and balanced by translocating existing fish between high-altitude lakes and streams.

In the United Kingdom, a small number of producers farm golden trout for commercial consumption.

== See also ==
- Garibaldi (the state saltwater fish of California)

== Other sources ==
- Finkel, David (Summer 2005). "The New Gold Rush: Celebrating and Protecting the California Golden Trout in the Sierra Nevada" (PDF). The American Fly Fisher. 31 (3): 10–21. Archived from the original (PDF) on 2014-11-29.
