= Irving L. Branch =

United States Air Force general

- Major General Irving L. Branch (left) shakes hands with F-111 test pilots Fred Voorhies and Val Prahl.
- Born: 1 August 1912; Keokuk, Iowa, US
- Died: 3 January 1966 (aged 53); Puget Sound, Washington, US
- Burial place: Arlington National Cemetery, Virginia US
- Military career
- Allegiance: United States
- Branch: United States Army (1935–1947); United States Air Force (1947–1966)
- Service years: 1934–1966
- Rank: Major General
- Commands: Air Force Flight Test Center; Aircraft Nuclear Propulsion Office; Air Force Special Weapons Center
- Conflicts: World War II
- Awards: Legion of Merit (2); Distinguished Flying Cross; Air Medal

Irving Lewis Branch (1 August 1912 – 3 January 1966) was a United States Air Force general. A graduate of the Norwich University, he served in the China Burma India Theater during World War II. After the war was the chief of staff of Armed Forces Special Weapons Project, deputy commander of the Air Force Special Weapons Center, and the head of the Aircraft Nuclear Propulsion Office. In 1959 he assumed command of the US Air Force Flight Test Center, where he was in charge of the X-15 program and the first test flight of the experimental B-70 Valkyrie supersonic bomber. He died on active service when his T-38 Talon jet crashed into Puget Sound.

== Early life ==
Irving Lewis "Twig" Branch was born in Keokuk, Iowa, on 1 August 1912, the son of Gordon Irving Branch, a chemical and electrical engineer, and his wife Helen née Lewis. He had two sisters, one of whom, Elizabeth H. Branch, became a colonel in the Women's Army Corps. He graduated from Stamford High School in Stamford, Connecticut, in June 1930, and then entered Norwich University in Northfield, Vermont, from which he graduated with a Bachelor of Science degree in civil engineering in June 1934. He was member of Norwich University Reserve Officer Training Corps, reaching the rank of staff sergeant.

After graduation, Branch enrolled in the Army Air Force Aviation Cadet Training Program, from which he graduated in June 1935. He was commissioned as a second lieutenant in the United States Army Air Corps, and posted to the 1st Pursuit Group, which was based at Selfridge Field, Michigan. While there he married Margaret Dulaney "Jolly" Rogers on 19 June 1937. He spent the next two years with the 5th Bombardment Group at Luke Field in the Territory of Hawaii He returned to the United States in 1939, and became the operations officer of the 9th Bombardment Group at Mitchel Field, New York. In January 1941, he was assigned to the newly-formed 18th Reconnaissance Squadron, which had responsibility for antisubmarine operations. He then became the liaison officer for antisubmarine warfare with the Secretary of War.

== World War II ==
During World War II, Branch served in the China-Burma-India Theater, where he was the American co-commander of the 1st Bombardment Group of the Republic of China Air Force, flying North American B-25 Mitchell bombers. He flew 79 combat missions, including one against Formosa in November 1943 which was the first against Japanese pre-war territory since the Doolittle Raid in 1942. For his services commanding, training and leading Chinese pilots, he was awarded the Distinguished Flying Cross, Chinese Air Force Wings and the Chinese Order of the Cloud and Banner. Branch also received the Air Medal and the Legion of Merit for his wartime service.

Branch returned to the United States in September 1944, and became the commander of the 72nd Fighter Wing at Colorado Springs Army Air Base in Colorado. This was a training formation of the Second Air Force for fighter pilots.

== Post-war ==
After the war Branch attended the Armed Forces Staff College. After graduation in September 1947, he became the assistant to the United States Air Force (USAF) representative of the US Military Staff at the United Nations, working with some of the Chinese pilots that he had trained during the war. He went to Europe as the chief of the Air Intelligence Division of the Directorate of Intelligence for the US Air Forces in Europe. In August 1952, he returned to the United States and attended the Air War College, from which he graduated in July 1953.

Branch's next assignment was in Washington, D.C., as the assistant chief of the Development Directorate of the Armed Forces Special Weapons Project (AFSWP), which was responsible for nuclear weapons. He was chief of staff of the AFSWP from January 1954 until September 1957, when he moved to Kirtland Air Force Base in New Mexico, and became the deputy commander of the Air Force Special Weapons Center. He was promoted to brigadier in June 1959, and became head of the Aircraft Nuclear Propulsion Office, a joint USAF-Atomic Energy Commission effort to develop nuclear-powered aircraft. It also oversaw Project Pluto, which created a reactor for a nuclear-powered Supersonic Low Altitude Missile (SLAM). He received an additional award of the Legion of Merit for his service.

On 29 July 1961, Branch became the commander of the USAF Flight Test Center. As such, he was in charge of the X-15 program and the first test flight of the experimental B-70 Valkyrie supersonic bomber. He died on 3 January 1966, when his T-38 Talon jet crashed into Puget Sound while on a solo flight to Boeing in Seattle, Washington. Divers recovered his body from the wreckage in 18 metres (60 ft) of water two days later, and he was buried in Arlington National Cemetery. Irving L. Branch Elementary School at Edwards Air Force Base is named his honor.

== Dates of rank ==
Insignia	Rank	Component	Date	Reference
	Second Lieutenant	United States Army Air Corps	June 1935	
	First Lieutenant	United States Army Air Corps	20 September 1940	
	Captain	United States Army Air Corps	25 May 1942	
	Major	United States Army Air Corps	1 July 1942	
	Lieutenant Colonel	United States Army Air Corps	9 January 1943	
	Colonel	United States Army Air Corps	2 January 1944	
	Brigadier general	United States Air Force	June 1959	
	Major general	United States Air Force	February 1965	
