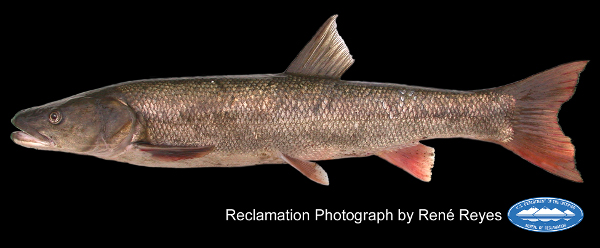

Conservation status
- Least Concern (IUCN 3.1)

Scientific classification
- Kingdom: Animalia
- Phylum: Chordata
- Class: Actinopterygii
- Division: Teleostei
- Order: Cypriniformes
- Family: Leuciscidae
- Subfamily: Laviniinae
- Genus: Ptychocheilus
- Species: P. grandis

Binomial name
- Ptychocheilus grandis (Ayres, 1854)

Synonyms
- Gila grandis Ayres, 1854; Leuciscus gracilis Ayres, 1854; Ptychocheilus major Agassiz, 1855; Ptychocheilus harfordi Jordan & Gilbert, 1881

= Sacramento pikeminnow =

Species of fish

The Sacramento pikeminnow (Ptychocheilus grandis), formerly known as the Sacramento squawfish, is a large species of freshwater ray-finned fish belonging to the family Leuciscidae, the daces, chubs, Eurasian minnows and related species. This species is endemic to California in the United States. It is native to the Sacramento-San Joaquin, Pajaro-Salinas, Russian River, Clear Lake and upper Pit River river basins. It is predatory and reaches up to 1.4 m (4.6 ft) in total length.

The species has been introduced into the Salt River, where it is considered an invasive species.

The species was introduced to the Eel River watershed in the 1970s by anglers using the pikeminnow as bait. It has a large appetite for salmonid species once it reaches about 6 inches (15 cm) long. Until then, it eats anything in its path. Because it is invasive in the Eel River, it has very few predators. River otter populations have increased and helped stabilize the pikeminnow population, but they still put pressure on endangered salmonid species.

== Species description ==
This species is known to have an elongated slender body with a flattened head and a large mouth which is well suited for prey. It has a narrow caudal peduncle and a deeply forked tail. Their former reference to 'squawfishes' is now considered offensive and outdated. Bigger adults have dark brown to olive coloration and the underside is golden-yellow. The smaller fish are silver and have a dark spot at the base of their tails. Spawning fish are observed to develop an orange-reddish coloration on their tails and males tend to develop nodes or tubercles on their heads. It has 8 dorsal, 8 anal rays, 15–18 pectoral rays and 9 pelvic fin rays. Their known maximum weight can be approximately 14.6 kg (32 lb), though the official record is only 5.19 kg (11 lb 7 oz). There are usually 67–75 scales on their lateral line and about 12–15 scales above the lateral line. It is closely related to the three other pikeminnow species part of the same genus - Colorado pikeminnow (Ptychocheilus lucius), Northern pikeminnow (Ptychocheilus oregonensis) and Umpqua pikeminnow (Ptychocheilus umpquae). These species can be distinguished based on regional distribution, weight and minor differences in appearance such as number of scales and rays.

== Regional distribution ==
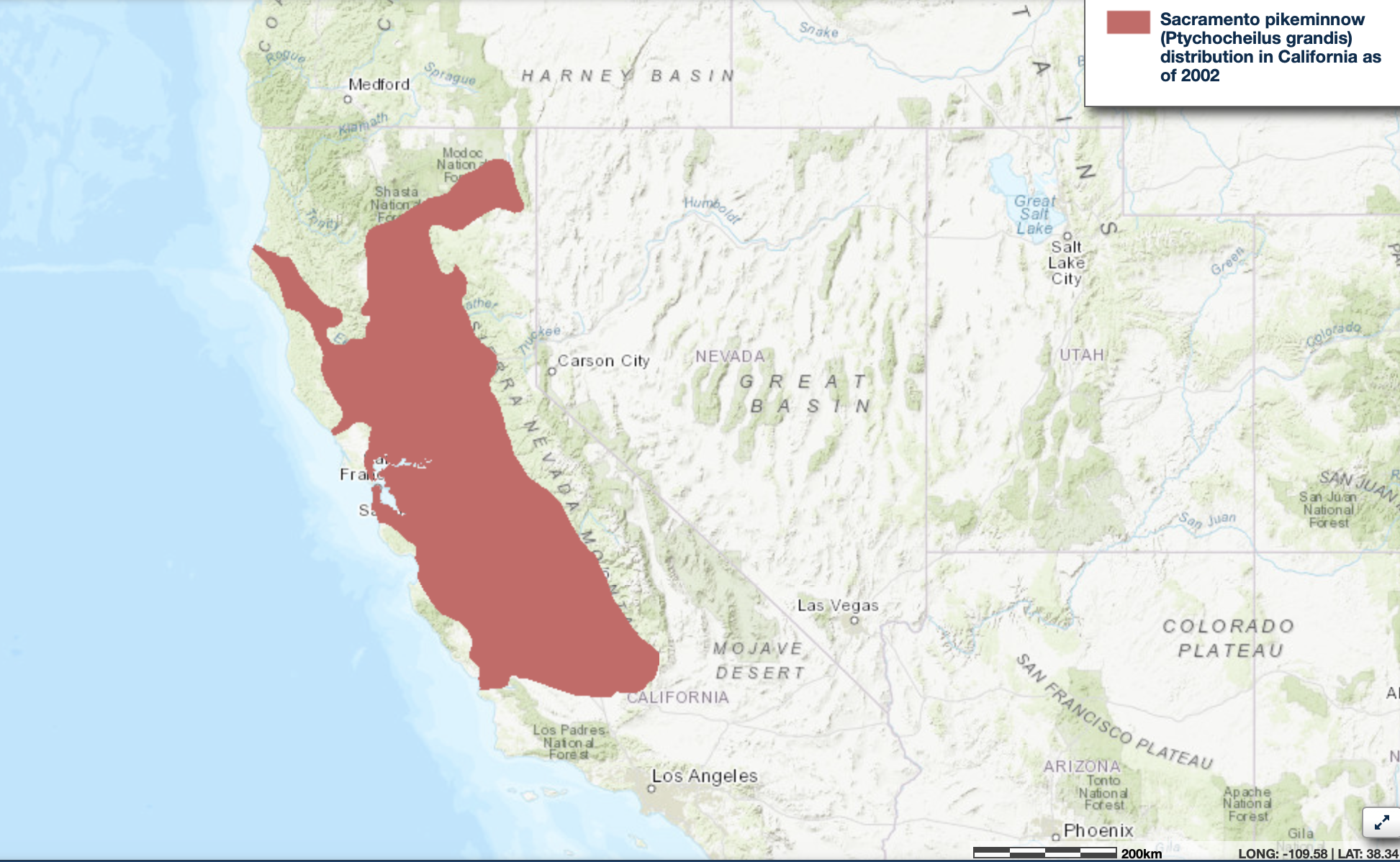
Distribution of Sacramento pikeminnow in California (https://databasin.org/datasets/6bf3a95a414b47308eaafe7df2bf5e87/

Sacramento pikeminnow is a common widely distributed species that is native to California.

Its natural distribution includes low and middle elevation run of the Sacramento-San Joaquin Province, the Clear Lake Basin and the Pajaro-Salinas and Russian river systems. They have also been introduced into the Eel River, Morro Bay tributaries and Southern California reservoirs. It is, however, uncommon in the freshwater Delta region. The species introduction resulted from juveniles released as bait fishes or in stocked gamefishes.

== Diet ==
The diet of Sacramento pikeminnow is diversified including freshwater and estuarine invertebrates and fish species. Juveniles smaller than 10 cm (3.9 in) fundamentally feed on insect larvae and aquatic invertebrates. As they grow, the focus of their diet shifts to crustaceans and then fishes. There is considerable overlap in the diet of this species and Striped Bass. Both are opportunistic feeders that prey on seasonally available food including chinook salmon, minnows and sculpins. They even prey on frogs, large stoneflies, lamprey ammocoetes, and small rodents. This piscivorous species is known to also feed on its own young. And so, the juveniles tend to inhabit more sheltered areas to avoid predation threats.

== Reproduction and age ==
These warmwater fishes can live up to 16 years. They become sexually mature around the age of 3–4. After which, they spawn annually and can lay 15,000- 40,000 eggs a year. This adds up to half a million eggs in the lifetime of a single female Sacramento pikeminnow. After hatching the larvae disperse by means of water flow and rapidly seek suitable habitat in the backwaters. Juveniles that migrate to the delta grow faster than those in the tributary habitats especially in spring and early summer. They spawn in rivers with no tides and migrate upstream from the deltas to do so. But there is a lot of variation in this behavior as some travel long distances to lay eggs and some remain exactly where they were. Ideally, they lay eggs in riffles and pool tails with substrates of gravel. In the warm springtime months of April and May, males look for suitable spawning habitat by swimming upstream. A single female is pursued by 1 to 6 males. As eggs are deposited down close to the riverbed, they are simultaneously fertilized by males swimming close behind the females.

== Cultural history ==
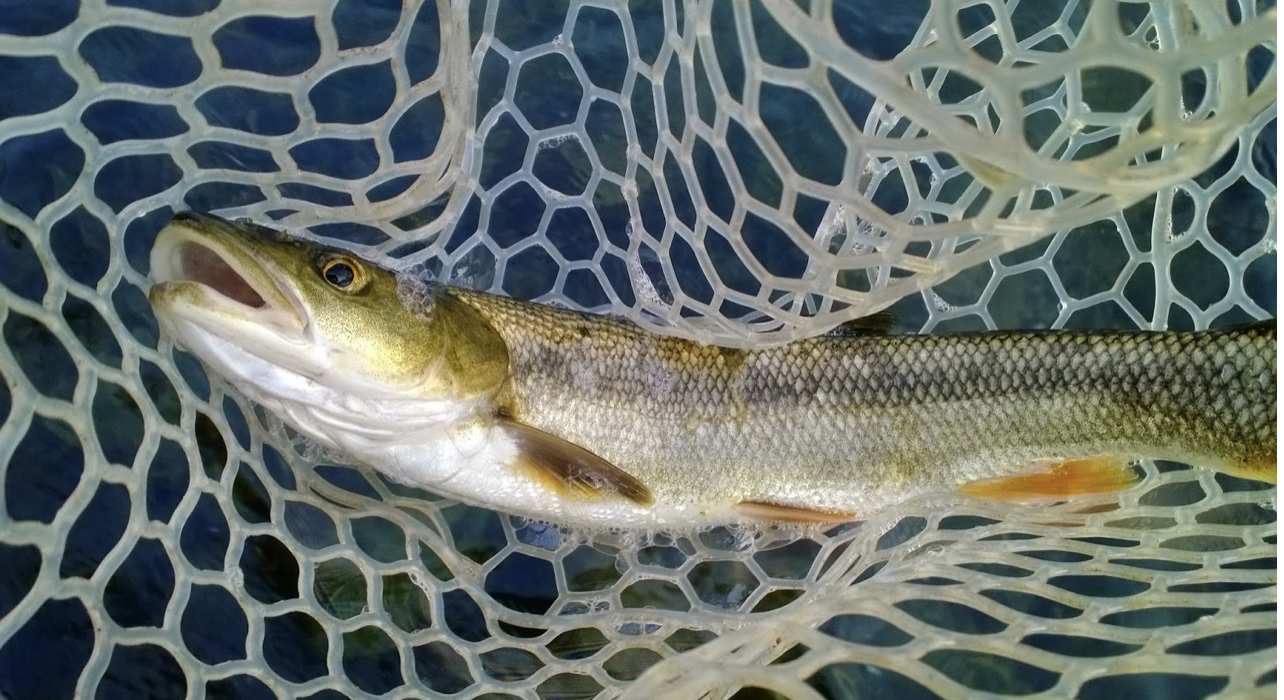
Sacramento pikeminnow (https://keepcalmandflyfish.com/2015/01/debunking-trash-fish-of-california.html)

The pikeminnows were historically considered a 'trash species' based on old ideas about 'good' and 'bad' fish. These fish were considered to be less desirable than trout or salmon or other commonly known game fish. It was understood that their apex predatory nature would contribute to elimination of more valuable fishes. Some native tribes in the past have consumed them in their diet. But more recently, it has been found to contain high levels of methylmercury and it is advised to not consume it. The community around Lake Pillsbury holds an annual sport reward Pikeminnow Derby awarding prizes to anglers who catch the largest, the smallest and most fishes. Such an event has been known to eliminate about 600 pounds (270 kg) of pikeminnow at a time.

== Threats ==
There has been evidence suggesting that pikeminnows have been a primary food source for otters along the San Francisco Eel River. Social groups of otters with more adults have been successful in capturing adult pikeminnow. This has prevented the complete decline of salmonids that are common prey of pikeminnow. Photographic evidence suggests that river otters can play a role in controlling the invasive pikeminnow populations. Large-scale elimination efforts and projects by the California department of Fish and wildlife have been futile and unsuccessful as of yet.

== Invasive species ==
The Sacramento pikeminnow competes with other native species such as the Central Coast Steelhead for habitat and prey on young trout. In the Morro Bay region, rainbow or steelhead trout and California red legged frog are common prey for pikeminnows. The Morro Bay Estuary Program has been successful in regulating pikeminnow population. The novel approach of environmental DNA has been used to keep track of the presence of this species. There have been collaborations with agencies for reevaluating plans of pikeminnow management.

== Conservation status ==
The conservation status is currently of least concern as the population has been thriving over the years. The Gold Rush of California (1848–1855) had certain implications on the population of this fish species amongst others. Due to the influx of miners and use of toxic substances including mercury, many environmental changes were brought about. Natural vegetation was replaced, and it has had significant impact on the feeding and habitat of the Sacramento pikeminnow. In the coming years with lower water discharge and higher air temperatures, the population of this species is expected to move upstream earlier increasing competition with other native species. Greater understanding of this species and its interaction with other native species will be crucial to overcoming challenges caused by the climate and resource limitations.
