= Little Kern golden trout =

Conservation status
- Threatened (ESA)

Scientific classification
- Kingdom: Animalia
- Phylum: Chordata
- Class: Actinopterygii
- Division: Teleostei
- Order: Salmoniformes
- Family: Salmonidae
- Genus: Oncorhynchus
- Species: O. mykiss
- Subspecies: O. m. whitei

Trinomial name
- Oncorhynchus mykiss whitei (Evermann, 1906)
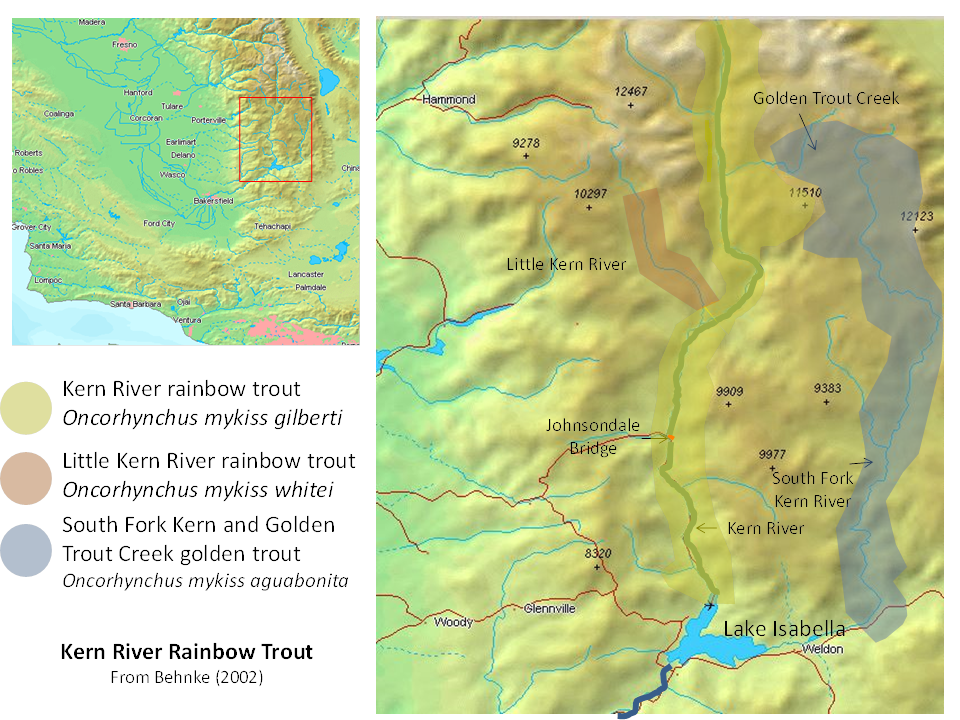
- Kern River trout range map

Subspecies of fish

The Little Kern golden trout (Oncorhynchus mykiss whitei) is a brightly colored subspecies of rainbow trout native to the main stem and tributaries of the Little Kern River in Tulare County, California. Together with the California golden trout (the state fish of California) and the Kern River rainbow trout, the Little Kern golden trout forms what is sometimes referred to as the "golden trout complex" of the Kern River basin.

== Taxonomic history ==
The evolutionary relationships between salmonoids are a matter of ongoing discovery, and there are different opinions about how specific populations should be grouped and named. The same can be said for the Little Kern golden trout, which has experienced several classification revisions since its first formal description.

The Little Kern golden trout was first described as Salmo Whitei in 1906 by the biologist Barton Warren Evermann in his book ...The Golden Trout of the Southern High Sierras. Everman had been sent to the Kern Plateau by Theodore Roosevelt, after Roosevelt's friend Stewart Edward White had expressed concern that the brightly colored trout of the region were at risk of being fished into extinction. Everman named the fish in honor of White's role in its recognition.

In 1989, morphological and genetic studies by Gerald Smith and Ralph Stearley indicated that trouts of the Pacific basin were genetically closer to Pacific salmon (Oncorhynchus species) than to the Salmos; brown trout (Salmo trutta) or Atlantic salmon (Salmo salar) of the Atlantic basin. Furthermore, in 1992 the Little Kern golden trout was then classified as a subspecies of rainbow trout (Oncorhynchus mykiss) by Robert J. Behnke. This led to the classification most commonly accepted today; Oncorhynchus mykiss whitei.

== Description ==
The Little Kern golden trout is a brightly colored fish with profuse black spots on the back and tail. The belly and cheeks are typically a bright orange to orange-red. The lower sides of the fish range from light yellow to bright gold. The back is olive green. The pectoral, pelvic and anal fins are orange with white tips. Unlike many varieties of rainbow trout, but similar to other redband trout and trout in the "golden trout complex", the Little Kern golden trout typically retain into adulthood up to ten parr marks along their sides. There is also often an intermediate row of smaller parr marks occurring above and/or below the main row of parr marks.

Morphologically, the Little Kern golden trout sits somewhat in between the California golden trout and the typical coastal rainbow trout (Oncorhynchus mykiss irideus). Compared to the California golden trout, the brilliance of coloration in the Little Kern golden trout is usually a bit more subdued. Little Kern goldens tend to have more black spots along its back, especially anterior to the caudal peduncle, and onto its head in comparison to California golden trouts. Compared to coastal rainbow trout, Little Kern goldens tend to have fewer, larger, and rounder spots. Little Kern golden trout in their native small stream habitat rarely exceed 12 inches (30 cm) in length and any fish exceeding 10 inches (25 cm) would be considered large.

== Historic range and habitat ==
Little Kern golden trout historically occupied roughly 100 miles (160 km) of the Little Kern River and its tributaries above a natural waterfall barrier preceding its confluence with the main stem Kern River.

== Conservation ==
As a result of hybridization with hatchery rainbow trout introduced into its watershed, the Little Kern golden trout as a distinct subspecies experienced a widespread contraction in its range. By the 1960s it was limited to only about 8 miles (13 km) of small headwater streams above three natural barriers. To address the problems of hybridization, planting of non-native trout ceased in the 1950s, and the California Department of Fish and Game (CDFG) began surveys in 1965 to initiate restoration efforts. Allozyme electrophoretic analyses begun in 1976 at UC Davis ultimately identified, what they thought were six pure populations of Little Kern Golden Trout. Restoration efforts began in 1975 with the first rotenone treatments being used to kill off non-native fish in the historic habitat. After chemical treatments there was a period of restocking of treated waters with pure Little Kern golden trout raised at the Kern River Fish Hatchery near Kernville, California from broodstock collected in the six "pure" populations previously identified. Additional restoration efforts included construction of barriers to the upstream movement of non-native trout, habitat improvement of streams damaged by cattle grazing, public education, and continued monitoring of fish populations, their genetic integrity, and habitat conditions. By 1996, restoration was believed to have been complete.

=== Conservation shortfalls ===
Later studies showed that one of the six populations used to form the Little Kern River golden trout broodstock, clustered genetically with California golden trout and rainbow trout instead of Little Kern golden trout. This study also showed that one individual fish collected as broodstock from Deadman Creek genetically clustered entirely with hatchery rainbow trout reference populations. This individual was likely inadvertently mixed with pure Little Kern Golden trout at the Kern River Fish Hatchery. The consequence of these two oversights meant that fish hybridized with rainbow trout and California golden trout were reintroduced back into Little Kern habitat.

An additional shortfall of the recovery is that the broodstock populations all came from small headwater streams with small individual populations and low genetic diversity. It is likely that the original removal of hybridized fish from the Little Kern Basin, also removed some native Little Kern golden genetic diversity that now cannot be restored. There is concern that the adaptability of the species has suffered as a result leading to an increased risk of extinction from disease or climate change. Furthermore, these populations are markedly divergent from each other; reflecting long isolation and population structure. Future work is needed to determine the extent to which divergent populations should be admixed when trying to expand the species back into its native range.
