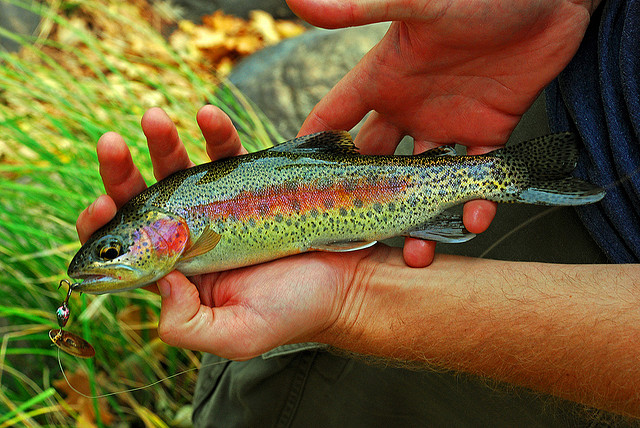

Conservation status
- Critically Imperiled (NatureServe)

Scientific classification
- Kingdom: Animalia
- Phylum: Chordata
- Class: Actinopterygii
- Division: Teleostei
- Order: Salmoniformes
- Family: Salmonidae
- Genus: Oncorhynchus
- Species: O. mykiss
- Subspecies: O. m. gilberti

Trinomial name
- Oncorhynchus mykiss gilberti (Jordan, 1894)
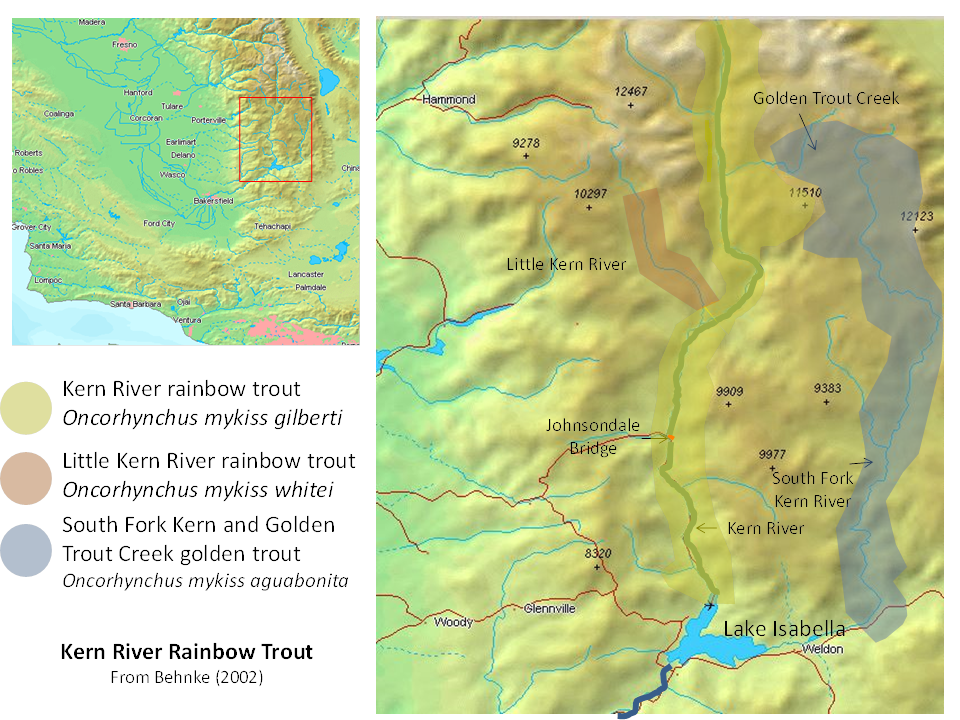
- Kern River trout range map

= Kern River rainbow trout =

Subspecies of fish

The Kern River rainbow trout (Oncorhynchus mykiss gilberti) is a localized subspecies of the rainbow trout (Oncorhynchus mykiss), a variety of fish in the family Salmonidae. It is found in a short section of the main stem of the Kern River and several tributaries in the southern Sierra Nevada in California. The Kern River rainbow trout is a "Species of Special Concern" in the state of California due to habitat loss and hybridization with other native and non-native trout in their range.

The Kern River rainbow trout is one of three subspecies of O. mykiss that are all endemic to the Kern River basin, sharing the headwaters of the river with the Little Kern golden trout and golden trout. Some of the existing range of the Kern River rainbow trout lies within the California Golden Trout Wilderness.

== Distribution ==
Kern River rainbow trout are endemic to the Kern River and tributaries in Tulare County, California. Its current range is drastically reduced from its historic range. Remnant populations live in the Kern River above Durrwood Creek, in upper Ninemile, Rattlesnake and Osa Creeks, and possibly in upper Peppermint Creek. Kern River rainbows have been successfully introduced into the Kaweah-Kern River and Chagoopa Creek. Its historic range in the main stem of the Kern River probably extended downstream below where Isabella Dam is today and upstream in the South Fork of the Kern River as far as Onyx creek. The subspecies has been extirpated in the Kern River from the Johnsondale bridge downstream. The Kern River rainbow trout hybridize with nonnative, introduced stocks of rainbow trout, and Behnke (2002) doubts that pure Kern River rainbow trout still exist in their historic range. Recent genetic analyses however suggest that some un-hybridized populations still exist.
