= Bridgelip sucker =

Conservation status
- Least Concern (IUCN 3.1)

Scientific classification
- Kingdom: Animalia
- Phylum: Chordata
- Class: Actinopterygii
- Order: Cypriniformes
- Family: Catostomidae
- Genus: Catostomus
- Species: C. columbianus

Binomial name
- Catostomus columbianus C. H. Eigenmann & R. S. Eigenmann, 1893

Species of fish

The bridgelip sucker (Catostomus columbianus) is a fish in the family Catostomidae that occupies the Columbia River system. Like all sucker fish, they live only in fresh water. Bridgelip suckers have a tendency to live in deeper waters during the day and move into shallower water around evening time. As adults they eat periphyton (green growth and microorganisms found on submerged substrata). Adolescents, however, eat aquatic hatchlings and zooplankton. Adult bridgelip sucker range in size from 5 inches to 17 inches. They spawn around May, when the water temperature is between 8-13 C, and lay somewhere around 9,955 and 21,040 eggs. Inside of the Columbia River system, the bridgelip sucker shares much of its territory another similar looking sucker, the largescale sucker.
