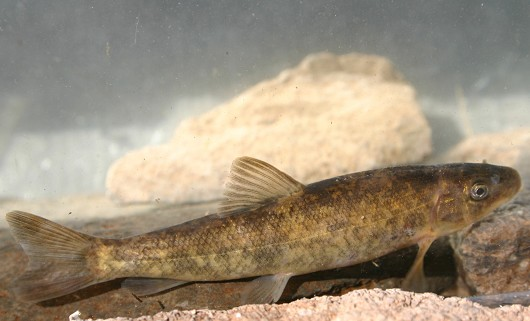

Conservation status
- Least Concern (IUCN 3.1)

Scientific classification
- Kingdom: Animalia
- Phylum: Chordata
- Class: Actinopterygii
- Order: Cypriniformes
- Family: Catostomidae
- Genus: Catostomus
- Species: C. fumeiventris

Binomial name
- Catostomus fumeiventris R. R. Miller, 1973

= Owens sucker =

Species of fish

The Owens sucker is a fish in the family Catostomidae that is endemic to eastern California. The species name fumeiventris comes from the Latin fumeus meaning "smoky" and ventris meaning "belly." Originally described as a population of sandbar suckers (Catostomus arenarius), it became recognized as its own species in 1938. Owens suckers are closely related to Tahoe suckers and possess the ability to hybridize with Santa Ana suckers.

== Description ==
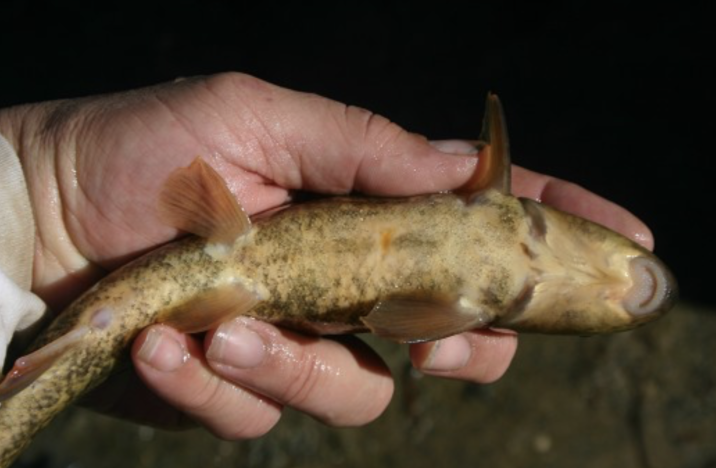
Bottom view of an Owens sucker

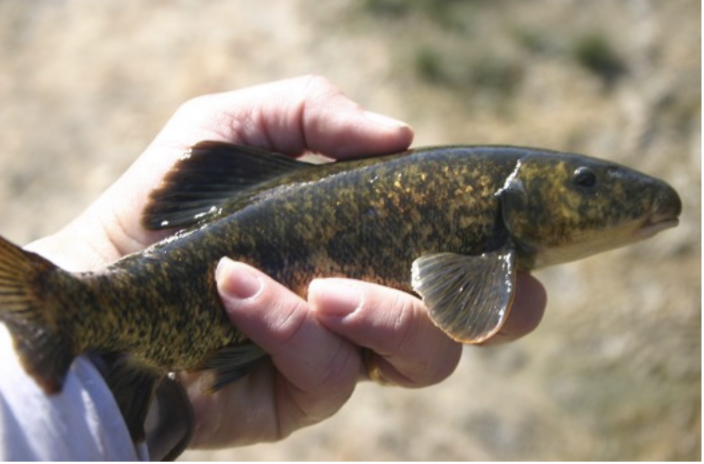
Side view of an Owens sucker

The Owens sucker has an inferior mouth facing the bottom of water sources and has pectoral fins flattening out, suggesting it prefers staying near the bottom of the river or lake bed. Tending to feed at night, this fish often feeds on algae and other organic matter that sinks to the bottom of these waterways. It has 10 dorsal fin rays with a dusky abdomen more pronounced in nuptial males and lacks the red lateral stripe of a similar species, the Tahoe Sucker. The Owens sucker is similar to the Tahoe sucker (Catostomus tahoensis), but it has coarser scales and is duller in colour. The Owens Sucker larva has a more complete line of melanophores around its gut when compared to the Tahoe sucker. Owens suckers also have differently shaped mouths when compared. The Owens sucker has fewer than 80 lateral line scales as opposed to the Tahoe suckers possessing more than 80 lateral line scales, making for easier distinctions. The adults are slaty-colored. Some individuals, especially spawning males, have very dark bodies with dusky bellies. It grows to a maximum size of 50 cm (20 in) but is usually found around 30 cm (12 in) in total length.

== Environment ==
Owens suckers prefer to live in water with temperatures between 100 and 120 degrees Fahrenheit (38-49 °C) and pH values ranging from 7.9 to 8.0. Despite their "least concern" conservation status, rising temperatures from climate change could potentially push water temperatures beyond the preferred range for Owens suckers. Due to the constantly changing conditions, monitoring is crucial. Owens suckers favor waterways with finer substrates as opposed to areas with gravel or rocks. Although they have been introduced to other waterways, they are native to only one watershed, and the territories they occupy are very limited due to human interaction. These fish, however, are very adaptable and can repopulate habitats as well as compete with non-native species.

== Distribution ==
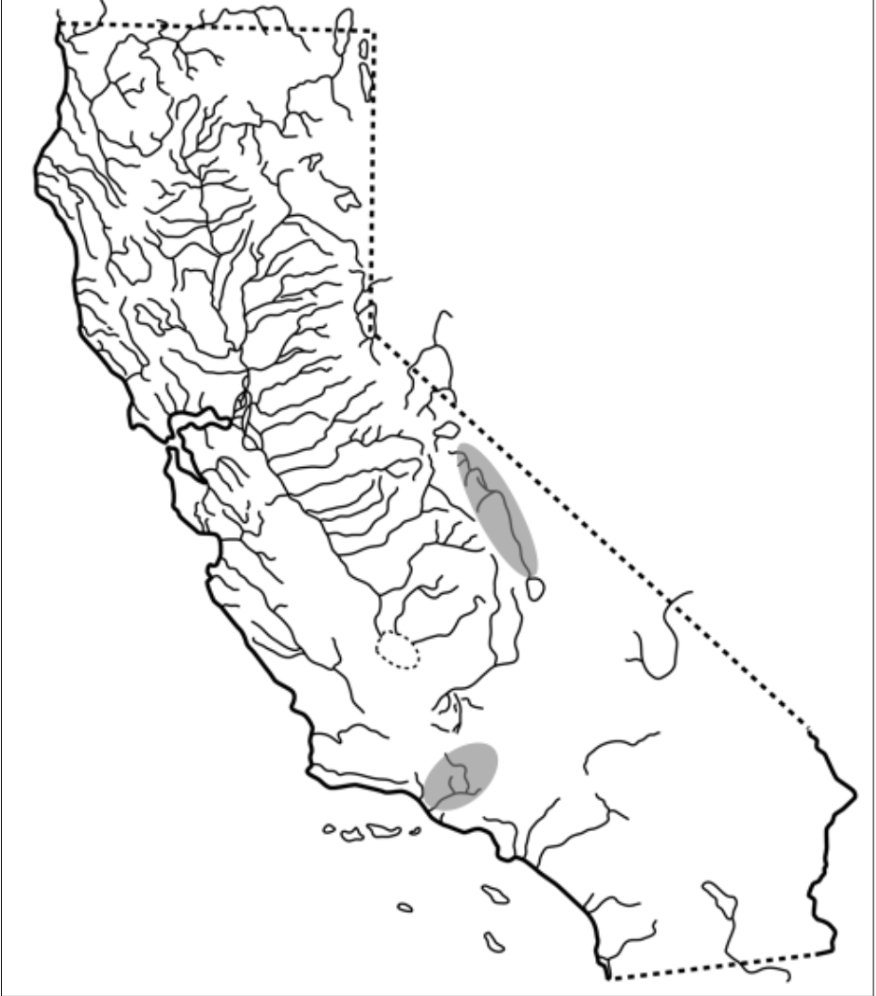
Areas where Owens sucker is commonly found

Owens suckers are endemic to the Owens River in the Owens Valley of eastern California and have been introduced into June Lake in the Mono Lake basin and to the Santa Clara River system as a result of a release of water from the Owens River through the Los Angeles Aqueduct. It is abundant in Crowley Lake, with populations in Convict Lake and Lake Sabrina, and populations have been established in the Owens River sanctuary. This species is also present in Sespe Creek near the outlet of the Fillmore Hatchery and Piru Creek above Lake Piru, California. The endemic location of the Owens sucker, Owens Valley, originally lacked aquatic diversity, with only two minnow species, the Owens sucker and a killifish, notably missing any species of trout that were common in areas North and West of the Owens Valley. The exact population in the Santa Clara system is uncertain, but introduced Owens suckers often end up hybridizing with the native Santa Ana suckers in this region.

== Conservation status ==
During the 1870s, irrigation projects diverted water away from Owens Valley, which drastically altered the aquatic systems. Around 1890, catfish, along with carp and salmon, were introduced to the valley, leading to a serious decline in native fish populations. Several native fish, such as the Owens pupfish and Owens tui chub, are now endangered, and the Owens speckled dace is a "species of concern." However, the Owens sucker, itself, is a species of least concern. Approximately 83% of California's inland fish species are either extinct or experiencing population decline. Despite this, when evaluated on a 1–5 scale, taking into account factors such as area occupied, climate change resistance, and overall tolerance, the Owens sucker received a value of 3.9. Its score indicates that its population is relatively stable, but should still be monitored. The largest threats to the Owens sucker include the construction of dams, regulation of the Owens River, urbanization of areas near the Owens River, and predation by invasive species. Factors such as grazing, wildfires, and harvesting are seen as negligible when considering the conservation of this species. A 1993 source reports that large numbers of adults would congregate below the outlet of the Fillmore Hatchery for weeks in March, but their numbers have decreased by half since 1989.

California has looked into an umbrella species program, where the conservation and monitoring of select species indirectly protect the many other species that comprise the habitat. It is unclear which Californian Freshwater species would be the umbrella species, but the Owens sucker is a candidate alongside the White sturgeon, Santa Ana sucker, and Sacramento pikeminnow.

== Biology ==
Owens suckers are nocturnal. Their diet consists of aquatic insects, algae, detritus, and organic matter. They spawn from May through early July over gravel substrates in tributaries, though populations in lakes will also spawn over gravelly areas of the lake beds and springs. The lifecycle of the Owens sucker is split into three phases: pre-larvae, post-larvae, and juveniles. Pre-larvae measure around 11–12 mm in length and have a yolk for the full length of their gut. At around 12 mm, most pre-larvae successfully transition into post-larvae. The pelvic fin for the Owens sucker does not appear until the fish reaches lengths of around 18–22 mm, at which point they appear as small buds. The larvae transition into juveniles when they reach a total length of 19–22 mm. At this stage, the fin rays are fully developed, and the anterior gut darkens noticeably. The juveniles tend to seek refuge along stream margins and in backwaters, often hiding among aquatic weeds.

When reproducing, the genes of the Owens sucker undergo "gene silencing," where one set of genes becomes inactive, often allowing for evolutionary advancements in their morphology. While being tetraploid, the Owens sucker may behave as if it were a diploid due to many of its genes being silenced. On average, the Owens sucker only expresses 42% of its duplicated genes. It grows to a maximum size of 50 cm but is typically found at 30 cm. Closely related species, such as the Tahoe sucker, have diploidization events occurring in their genome. Still, more research is needed to determine whether the Owens sucker could also undergo a return of its genome back to a diploid state.

Comparisons between the Owens sucker and the Owens tui chub support the hypothesis that the Lahontan Basin and the Owens River Basin were once connected but split apart due to geological changes such as the formation of the Owens River gorge. Additionally, genetic data supports the hypothesis that the Speckled dace and Owens sucker may have been separated due to a volcanic event around 760,000 years ago.
