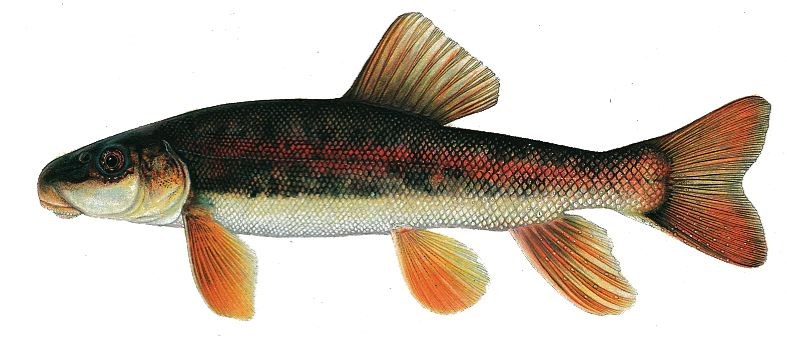

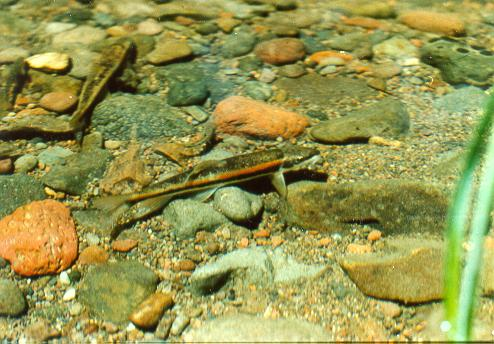
- Modoc sucker in spawning colors

Conservation status
- Near Threatened (IUCN 3.1)

- Imperiled (NatureServe)

Scientific classification
- Kingdom: Animalia
- Phylum: Chordata
- Class: Actinopterygii
- Division: Teleostei
- Order: Cypriniformes
- Family: Catostomidae
- Genus: Catostomus
- Species: C. microps

Binomial name
- Catostomus microps Rutter, 1908

= Modoc sucker =

Species of fish

The Modoc sucker (Catostomus microps) is a rare species of freshwater fish native to northern California and southern Oregon. It grows to a length of about 7 in (18 cm) and becomes sexually mature at 4 in (10 cm). It feeds on algae, small invertebrates and detritus, and hides under stones, detritus and overhanging vegetation. It is found in only a few streams and is listed as an endangered species in California and the United States. Conservation measures have been put in place such as fencing the streams in which it lives from livestock. It was previously rated as "endangered" in 1973 by the International Union for Conservation of Nature, but this rating has now been changed to "near threatened", and the U.S. Fish and Wildlife Service removed the Modoc sucker from the federal list of endangered and threatened wildlife in 2016.

== Description ==
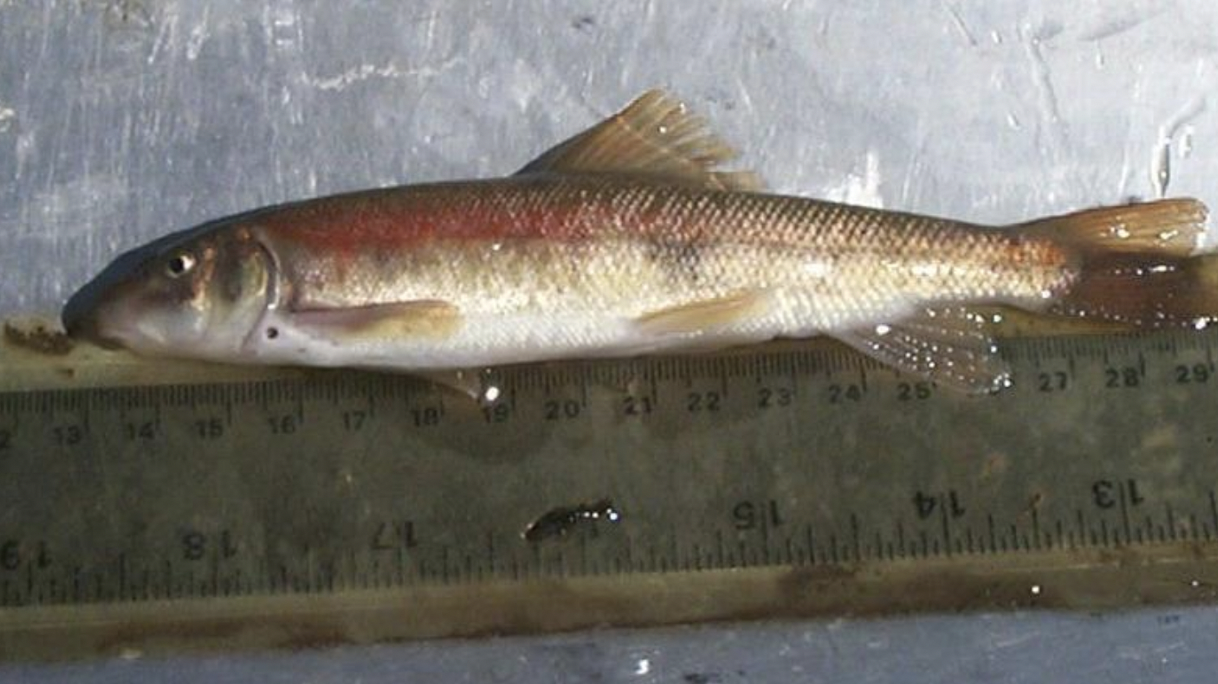
Modoc sucker lies on the ruler

Modoc suckers have short heads and small eyes. This sucker is mature when it reaches 3 to 4 inches (76 to 102 mm) long; the adult is usually no more than 7 inches (180 mm) long but it rarely exceeds 13 inches (330 mm). The largest Modoc sucker found in Goose Lake to date measured 11 inches (280 mm). Their lateral line scales count is usually 73 to 91.The average number of scales above the lateral line is 15 up to 19; the number of scales below the lateral line ranges from 9 to 12. It has been observed to reach five years of age at the oldest. Modoc suckers have 5 types of fins, which are dorsal, anal, pectoral, pelvic, and caudal. In detail, the number of dorsal fins ranges from 9 to 12 rays, anal fins from 7 rays, pelvic fins from 8 to 10 rays, pectoral fins from 15 to 17 rays, and caudal fins from 18 to 19 rays. The lower lip of Modoc Suckers is deeply notched and only one of the five to six rows of papillae connects the two lips. They have little yellowish-brown fins. Overall, they are greenish-brown or olive, and their backs are represented reddish color. Specifically, non-breeding body coloration of both sexes’ ranges from greenish brown to light blue to dark gray and olive. They have lighter coloration on the sides of the body with generalized mottling, usually with 3–4 darker spots similar in size to those of Sacramento suckers. The abdomen appears white to cream or yellowish with no markings. For breeding males, however, they have orange-red lateral bands, orange fins, and they have tubercles on their fins and body.

== Morphological similarity to other fishes ==
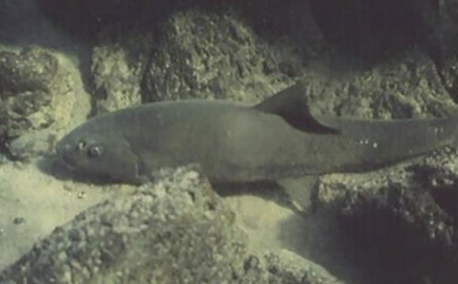
Sacramento sucker

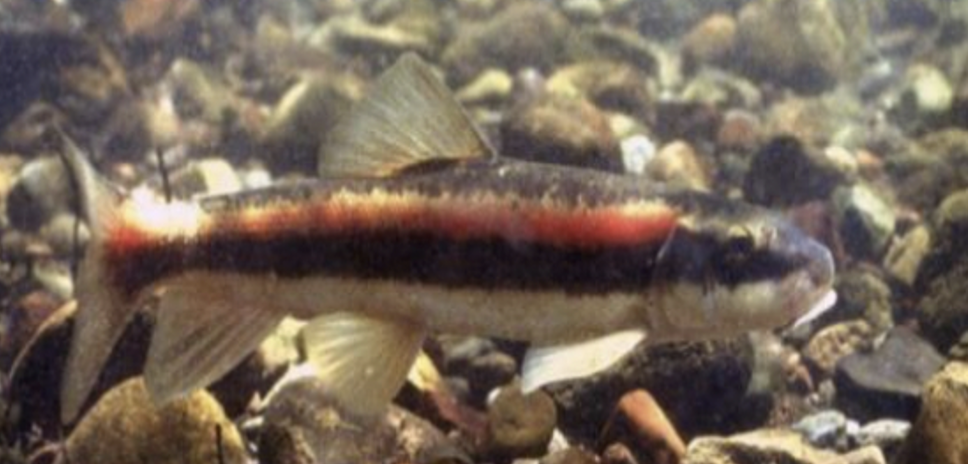
This is a Tahoe sucker

Modoc sucker is similar in appearance to other fishes in the sucker family and is especially most similar to the Sacramento sucker and Tahoe sucker. As a member of the sucker family, it has the typical characteristics of fish in this family, such as a pendulous mouth and a cylindrical body. However, they differ from each other in body length, head size, and number of scales, respectively. The Modoc sucker is a small fish with a short head and small eyes. It is also a small fish with a shorter head and smaller eyes, and the lower lip is deeply concave, with only one of the 5–6 rows of papillae connecting the two-halves; the number of lateral line scales is 73–91; and the number of dorsal fin rays is 9–12. However, Sacramento sucker can grow much larger in size and have a relatively long head. Specifically, the range of their dorsal fin scales is slightly higher and narrower (11–13) than Modoc sucker. In terms of the number of lateral line scales, Sacramento sucker has a relatively lower number of 56–75 than Modoc sucker. This feature is an important basis for distinguishing the two species. When compared to the Tahoe sucker and Modoc sucker, the Tahoe sucker is larger, up to 24 inches (610 mm) in length, and has a wider distribution throughout the Lahontan Basin of Southeastern Oregon, Nevada, and Northeastern California, primarily inhabiting large lakes and reservoirs. The dorsal fins of the Tahoe sucker have 9–11 fins, usually no more than 12, and the flanks of males appear distinctly red during the breeding season. During the breeding season, males have distinctive red stripes on their flanks.

== Distribution ==
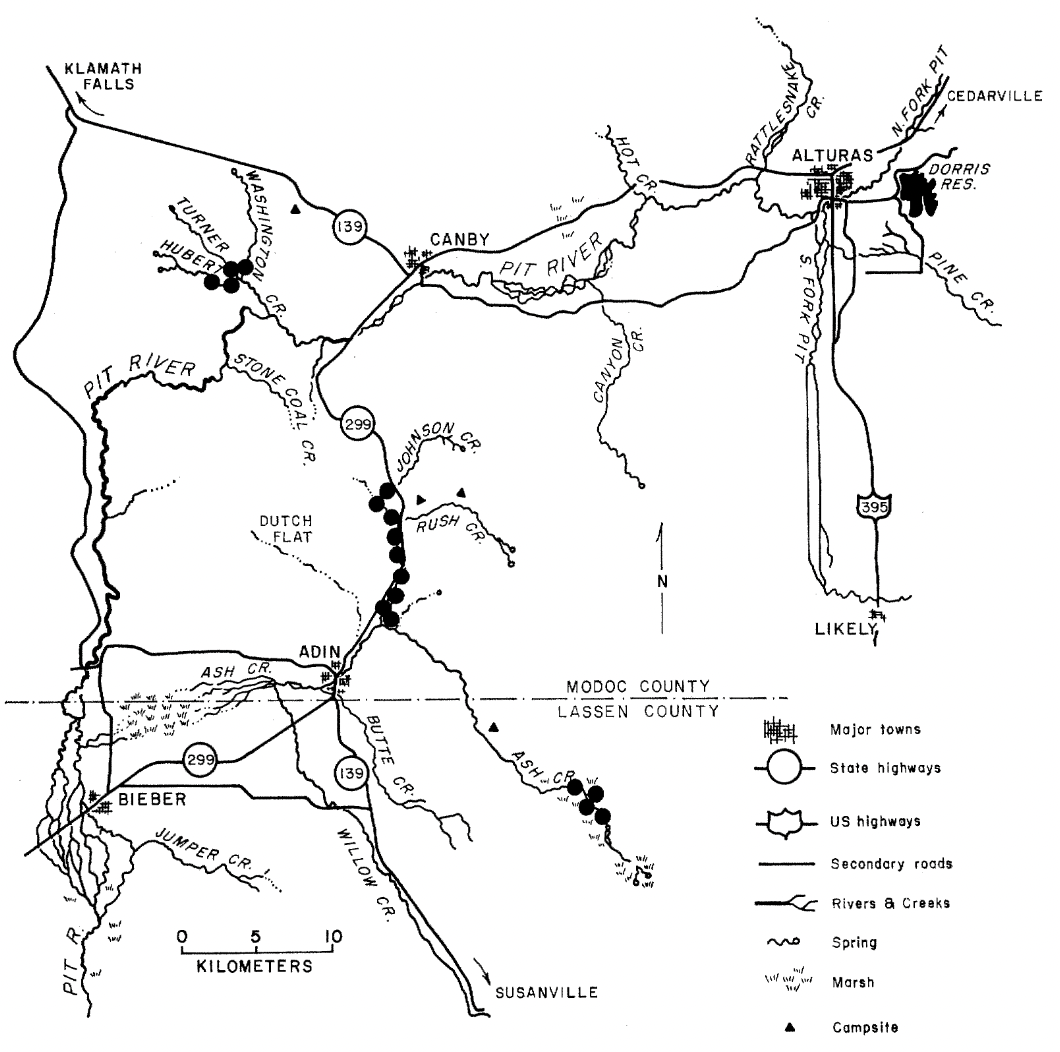
The black dots represent places where the Modoc sucker is often found

This fish is limited to a few creeks in northern California and southern Oregon, where its historical range was located in the Ash Creek and Turner Creek drainages in the basin of the Pit River, the Goose Lake basin, which was once connected to the Pit River，as well as, the lower Cox Creek, approximately 6 km (3.7 mi) downstream of the Thomas's waterfall. It can currently be found in ten streams in this region. The current habitat range of the Modoc sucker is quite extensive, covering approximately 68.4 kilometres (42.5 mi) of water. This range significantly expands its earlier known range. In 1977, the known habitat of this fish was limited to seven streams in the Turner Creek and Ash Creek subbasins, totalling approximately 20.8 kilometres (12.9 mi).Remarkably, the present range encompasses virtually all of the known historical range of the Modoc sucker, with the sole exception of Willow Creek in the Ash Creek watershed, which appears to be outside of its habitat at this time. Modoc suckers primarily inhabit waters between 1,286 and 1,567 metres (4,220 and 5,140 ft) above sea level. The topography of this generation of waters ranges from flat to moderately undulating. The river flows south and meanders through the valley, diverging and converging in a series of creek valleys with numerous agricultural backwaters along the way. Modoc suckers are found primarily in the following areas: the lower sections of the Rush River and its main tributary, the Johnson River, the upper marshy areas of the Gray River, and the middle sections of the Washington, Turner, and Hurlburt Rivers, as well as Ash creek. These streams are usually surrounded by vegetation and shade canopy like junipers, aspens, conifers, cottonwoods, willows, and chokecherries. For example, Ash Creek within the Grand Canyon are bordered by dense willow forests, which are closely surrounded by native grasslands or farmland.

== Preferred habitat conditions ==
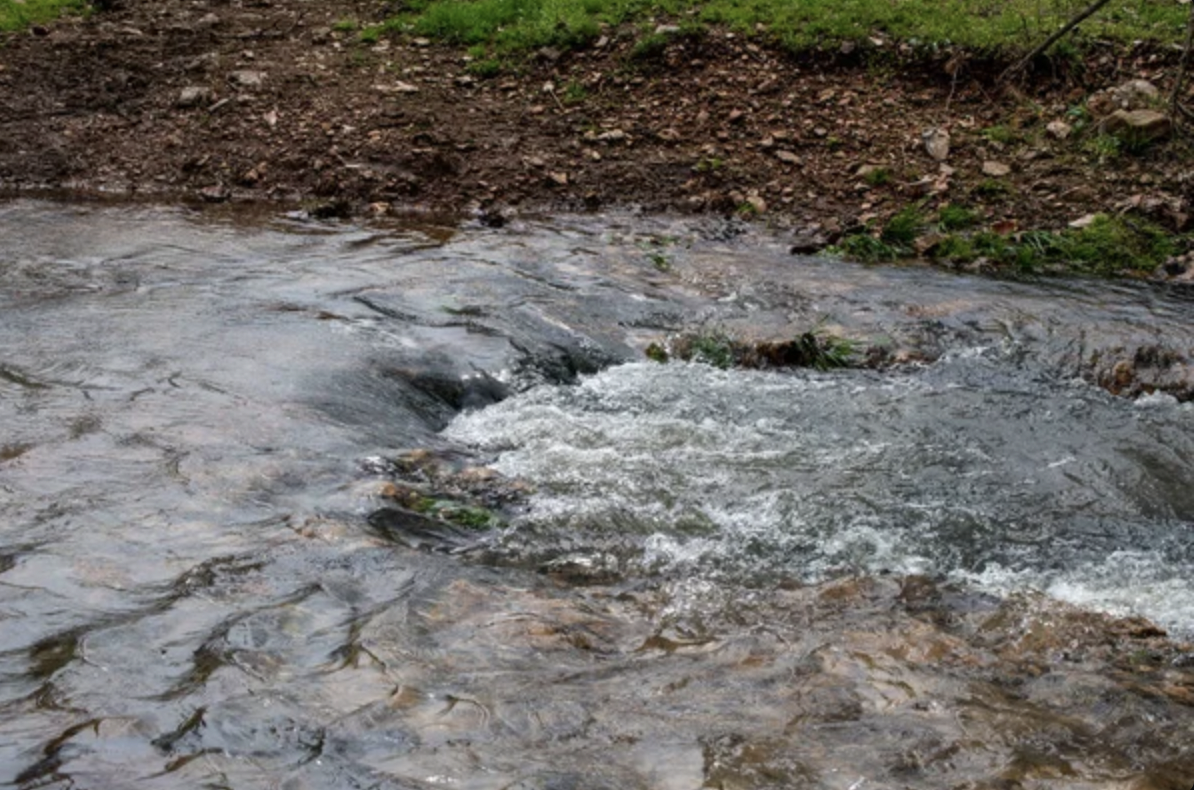
slow-moving stream

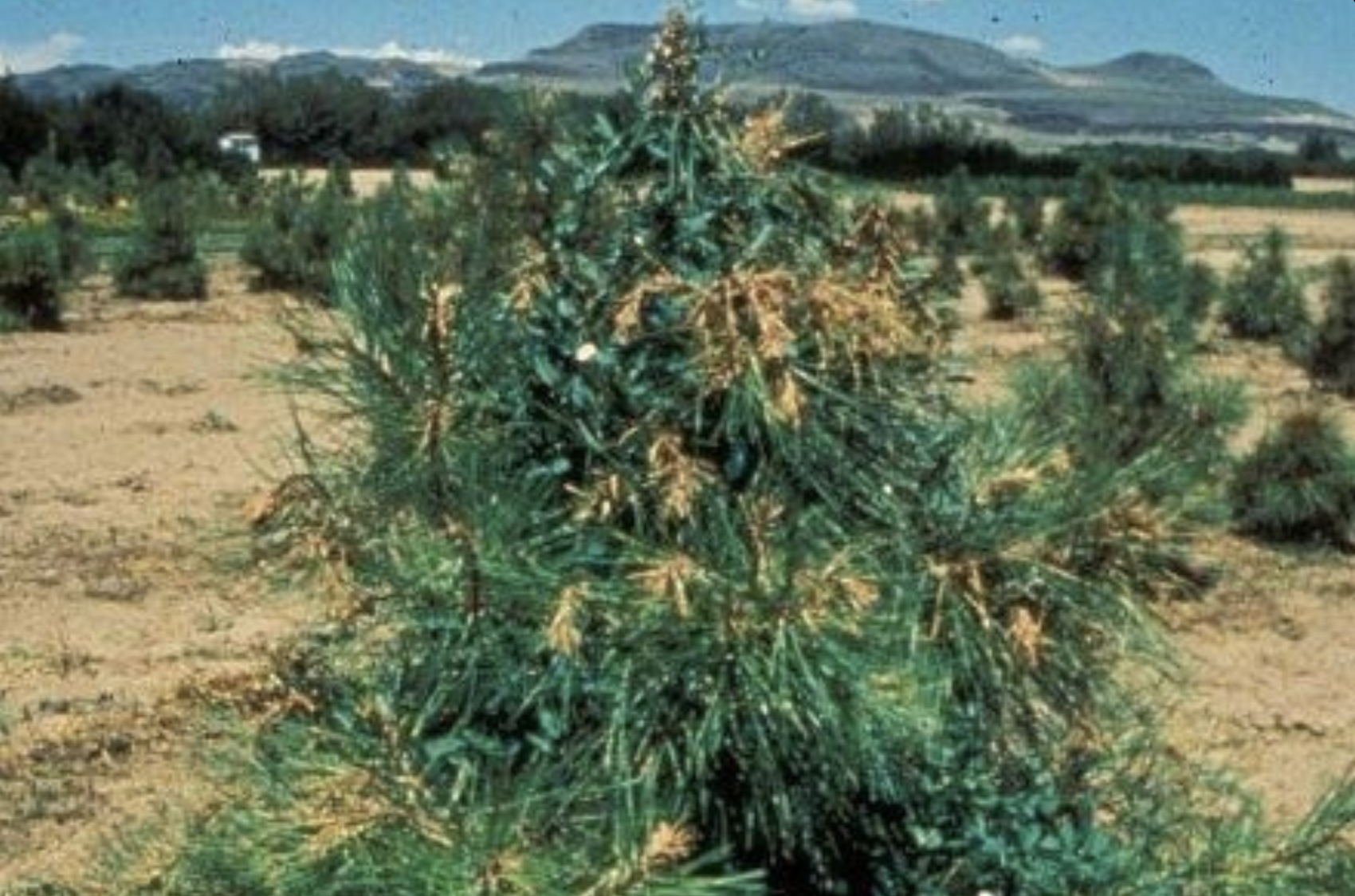
coniferous

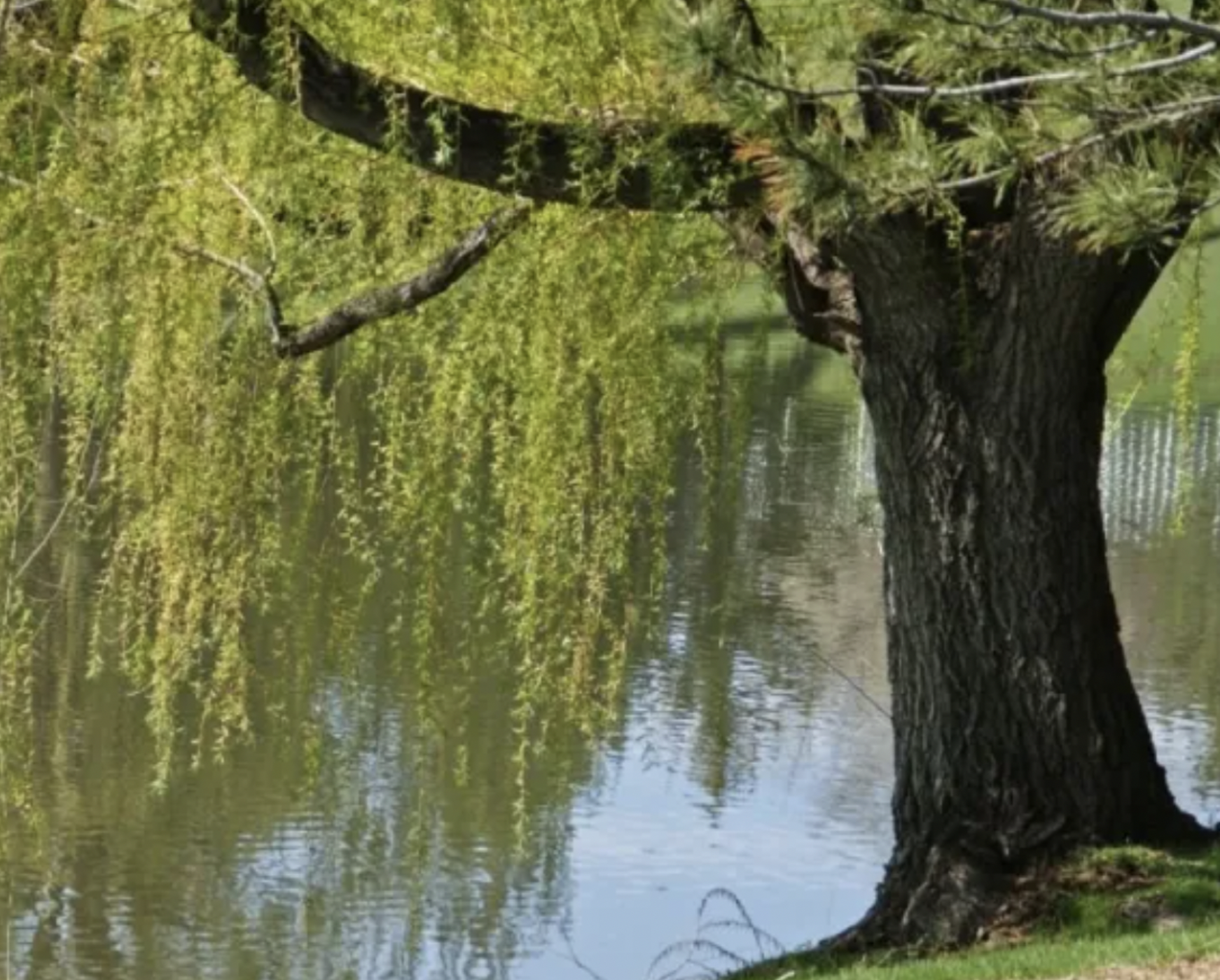
Willows

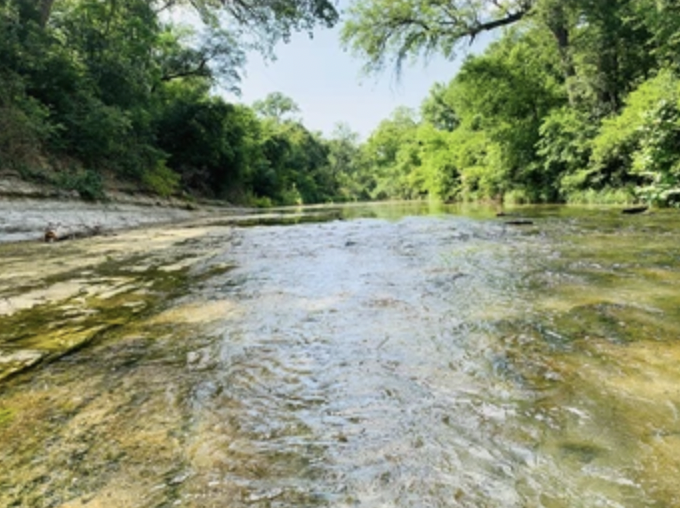
forested stream with clear water

Modoc sucker prefers specific habitats and are usually most abundant under the following conditions. First the water flows slowly, in some places intermittently, and has large shallow pools with muddy bottoms. Secondly, the water quality needs to be not only moderately clear but preferably partially shaded by trees, shrubs, or boulders for better prevent from large predators. The habitat temperature range for the Modoc sucker is usually between 6 and 25 °C (43 and 77 °F). This fish tends to avoid areas with excessively warm water and swift currents. Modoc suckers are rarely seen in headwater streams with steep gradients and swift currents. Similarly, they are difficult to detect in those areas of lower Ash Creek with deeper pools, higher temperatures, and higher flow (250–400 litres per second (3,300–5,300 imp gal/min).

In contrast, Modoc suckers are found primarily in the middle and lower reaches, which have moderate water temperatures, slower flows, and relatively shallow water depths. These characteristics provide an ideal environment for the Modoc sucker to survive. The stream habitat has substrates of sediment and cobble with large amounts of detritus in the water that the fish uses for cover. It also uses overhanging banks, large rocks, and vegetation for cover. Spawning occurs in substrates with a lot of gravel. The fish eats algae, small invertebrates, and detritus. The abundance of the Modoc sucker presents some interesting facts.

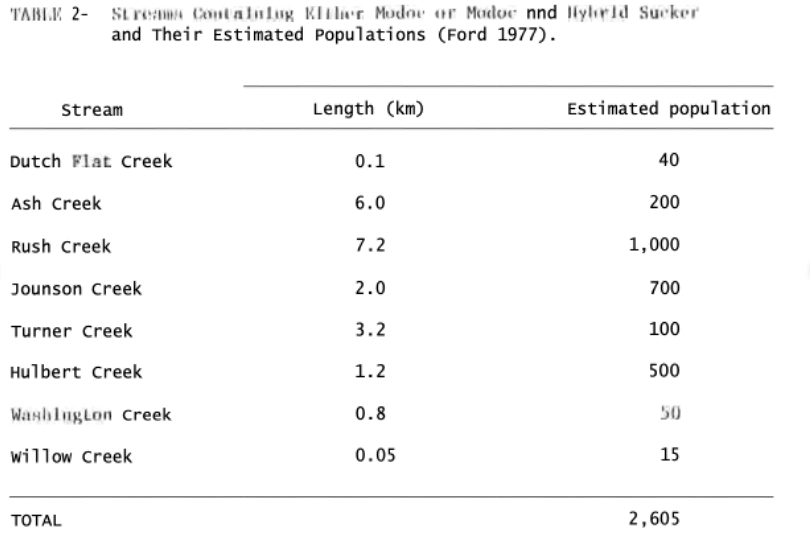
An estimated population of Modoc sucker in 1977

In 1976, the total number of Modoc sucker in the ten known inhabited rivers had exceeded 2600. Despite their seemingly impressive numbers, they still represent a relatively small percentage of the fish community in these waters. Recent studies have revealed some correlations between the Modoc sucker and other fishes. Populations of Modoc sucker showed a negative correlation with several other fish species. These fish include Brown trout, Pitt sculpins, and Sacramento sucker. This negative correlation may suggest some form of competition or ecological niche separation between these species

== Biology ==
=== Reproduction ===
Specific physiological conditions need to be met for the Modoc sucker to reach sexual maturity and be capable of reproduction. Typically, both females and males must be over 12 centimetres (4.7 in) in length and at least three years old. These conditions ensure that the fish have sufficient physiological development to support reproductive activity. Occasionally, some individuals mature early, especially among males, a few fish reach sexual maturity at just two years of age. The spawning season for Modoc Suckers begins in mid-April and ends in early June, with the actual spawning period lasting only three to four weeks in different streams. Like other suckers, Modoc suckers migrate upstream during the spawning season and use intermittent tributaries to spawn.

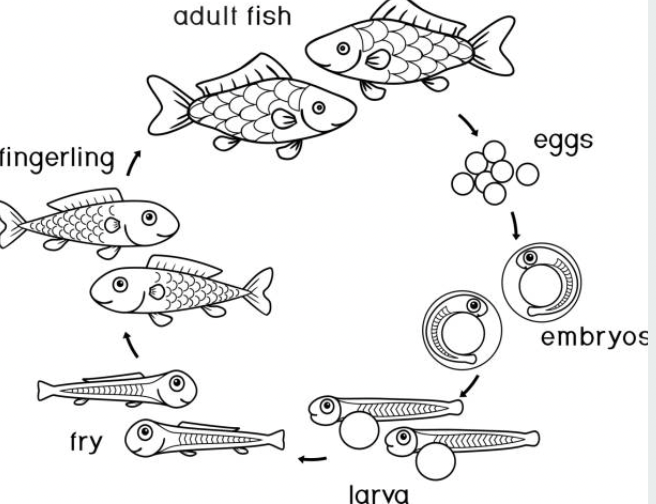
Simplified fertilizing process

They are very selective about time, temperature, place, and current speed when spawning. In detail, they prefer to spawn on the bottom of fine to medium gravel ponds at water temperatures of 13.3 to 16.1 °C (55.9 to 61.0 °F) from midday to mid-afternoon, approximately 10:00 a.m. to 4:00 pm. Water flow in the creek during their spawning period generally varied from 42.7 to 56.8-liter per second. Spawning usually occurs in water 15 centimetres (6 in) deep. After selecting a suitable site, one female and usually three males, one on either side and one behind, complete the spawning behavior. Spawning occurs during a 6- to 8-second interval when eggs and spawn are released simultaneously.

=== Age and Growth ===
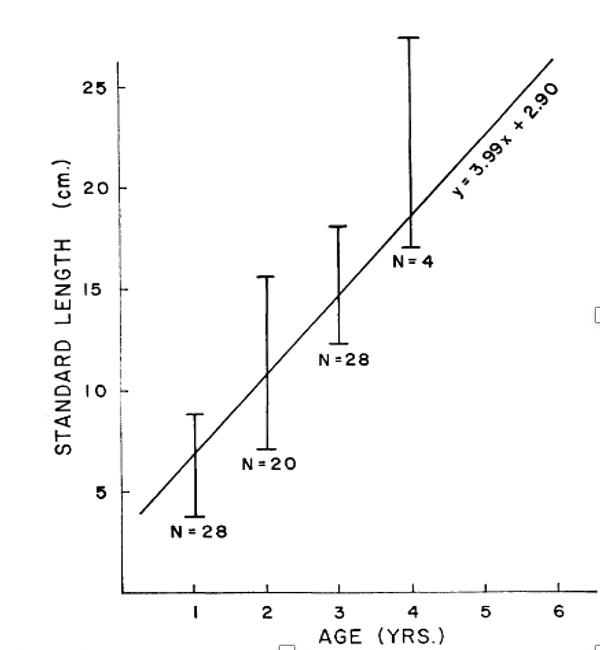
Relationship between age and body length in the Modoc sucker

The average lifespan of Modoc suckers is generally 3 to 4 years accompanied by a body length that rarely exceeds 160 mm. The oldest Modoc sucker found was 5 years old, with a body length of 280 mm. Modoc sucker adults are smaller in size. This is due to the fact that the species prefers to live in streams with a small range of relatively low temperatures. The relationship between age and length of Modoc sucker was found to be length inches = 3.99 age (years) + 2.90 [length (inches) = 1.57 age (years) + 1.14]. According to studies, the growth rate of the Modoc sucker is comparable to that of other California catostomid.

The age and growth of Modoc suckers are typically assessed using three main methods: otoliths, scales, and body length. Otoliths, which are small ear bones, develop annual rings that can be counted to determine the fish's age, much like counting tree rings. A Modoc sucker is generally considered mature when its otoliths show three rings. Scale count is another method used to estimate age. Adult Modoc suckers typically have between 73 and 91 scales. While the exact scale count for juveniles has not been precisely determined, it is known to be fewer than 73 scales. Lastly, body length serves as an indicator of age. Adult Modoc suckers usually measure between 8 and 13 centimetres (3.1 and 5.1 in) in length, whereas juveniles are typically no longer than 7.6 cm (3.0 in).

=== Food and Feeding habits ===
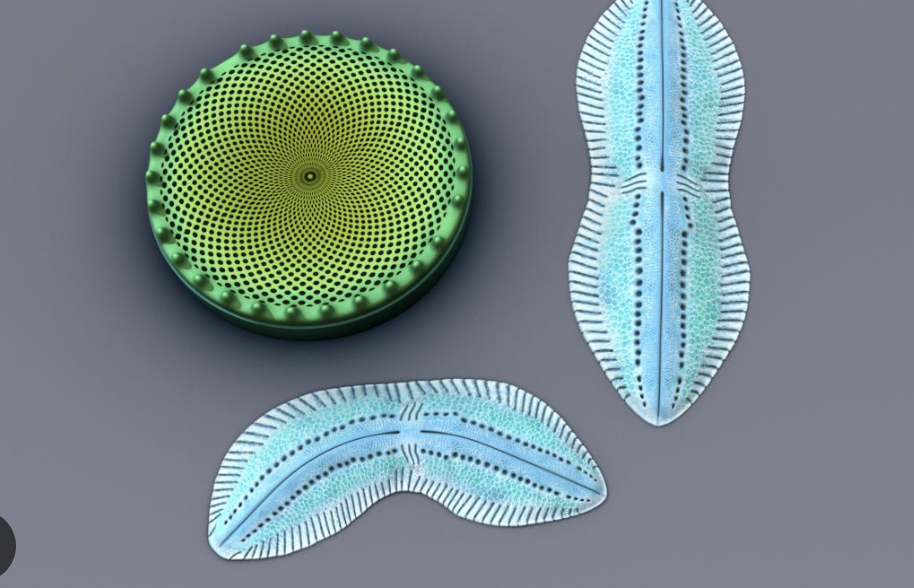
Diatom

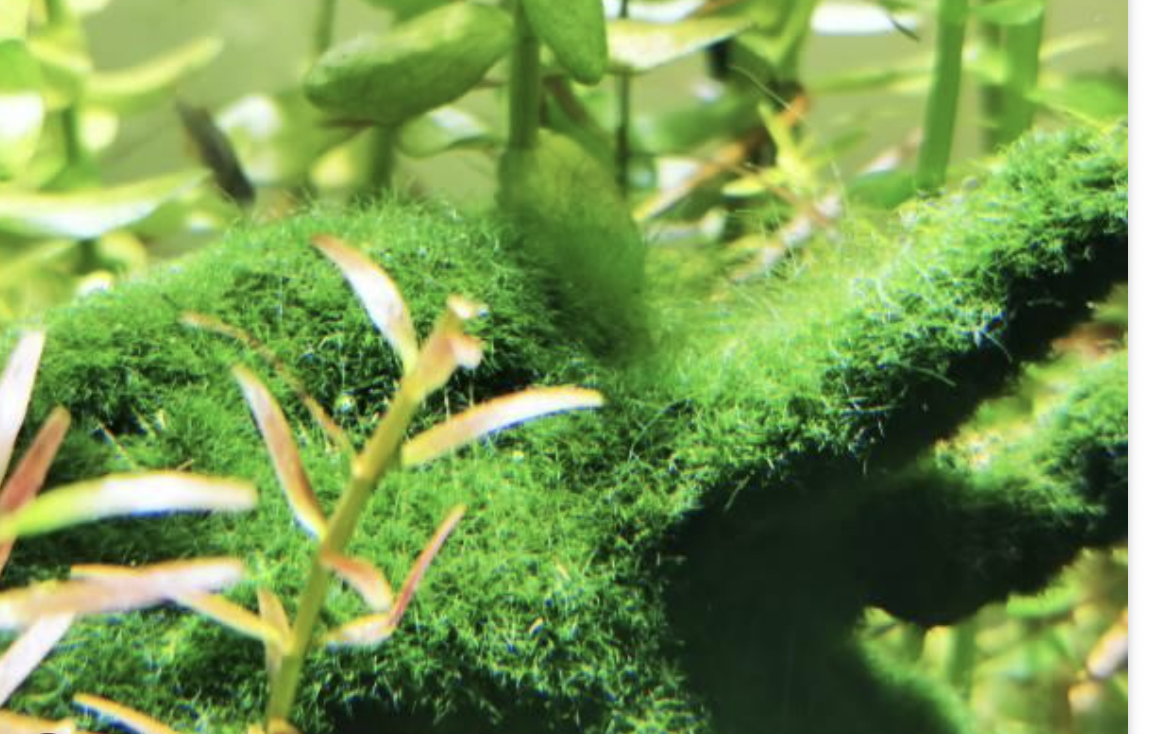
Filamentous algae

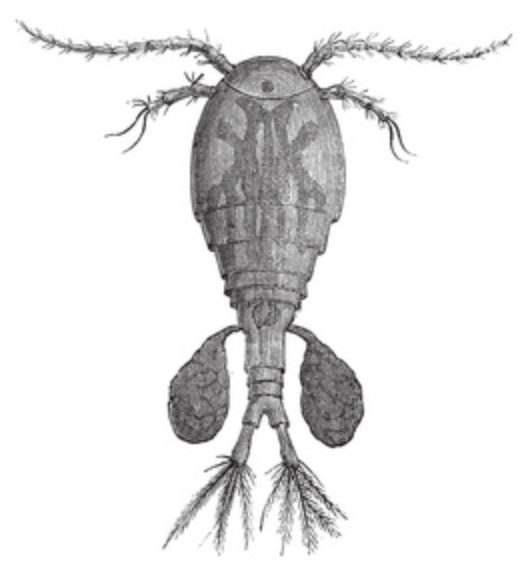
Nauplii

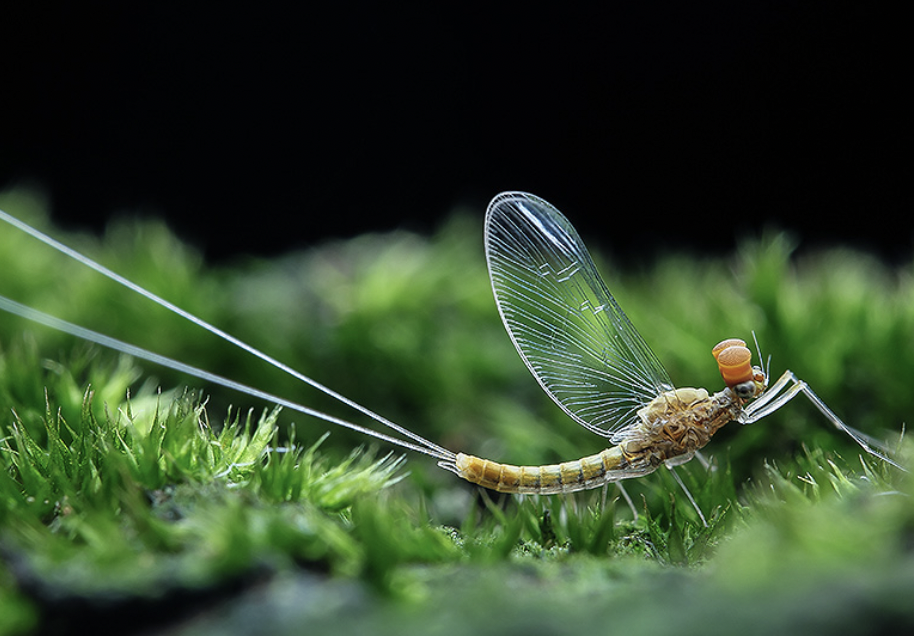
Mayfly larvae

The Modoc sucker has a diverse diet, with organic detritus, benthic invertebrates and algae as its main food sources. Diatoms and filamentous algae are common plant food items, while animal food items include larvae of the shaker mosquito, crustaceans, and larvae of aquatic insects, especially mayflies. The diet of the Modoc sucker changes as it ages. While the juvenile stage feeds primarily on organic detritus and algae, adults expand their diet to include the intake of chironomid larvae and other aquatic insects. This fish typically chooses to feed at the edges of slow-moving streams or at the bottom of ponds rich in detrital sediments and chironomid larvae. The dietary habits of the Modoc sucker are similar to those of the Sacramento sucker in Ash Creek as well as most species of the genus Catostomus.

=== Hybridization ===
Hybridization between Modoc sucker and Sacramento sucker occurs mainly in intermediate habitats where the two species co-occur. However, the main reason for their hybridization is unknown. This hybridization was originally thought to occur naturally due to the close affinity of the two species.

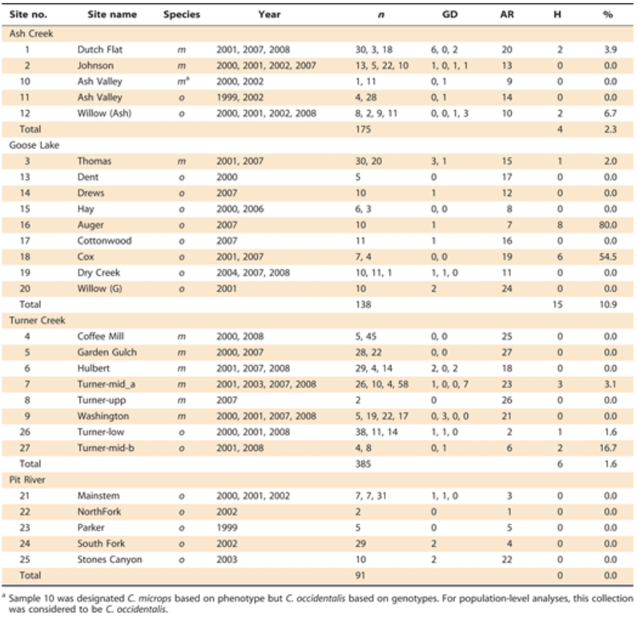
Numbers (H) and percentages (%) of individuals classified as hybrids. Pic coming from

In the past, it was hypothesized that there was a genetic link between Goose Lake and the Pit River because Goose Lake historically overflowed into the Pit River. However, the study showed that Goose Lake rarely overflows and has in fact been largely isolated from the Pit River since the Pleistocene.

It was not until 1986 that researchers discovered a partial overlap in spawning times between the two species: Modoc suckers typically spawn in April–June, while Sacramento suckers spawn in March–May. This temporal and spatial overlap may create conditions for hybridization. To reduce hybridization, management measures such as the establishment of fish barriers were taken in the 1980s. However, studies as late as 2011 still found two species coexisting in Ash Valley and central Turner Creek, suggesting that these are potential contact and hybridization areas. Overall, hybridization appears to occur primarily in the middle of the habitat overlap between the two species, but the exact reasons for this need to be further investigated.

== Status ==
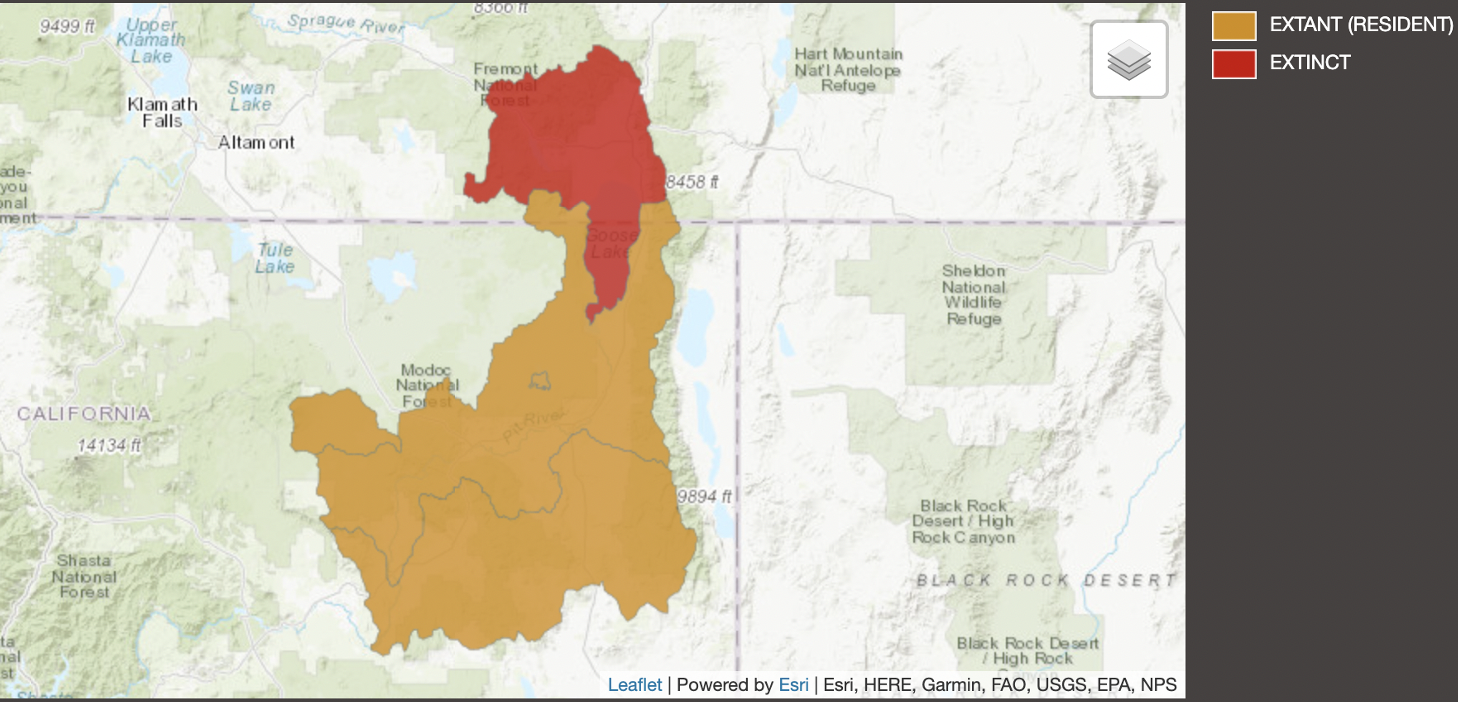
Main distribution of Modoc sucker

When the fish was placed on the US Endangered Species List it was threatened by the degradation of its habitat. Since then the habitat has been improved by the installation of livestock-excluding fences along waterways and other interventions. Chronologically, the Modoc sucker was first listed as an endangered species in 1985. At that time, the fish inhabited only seven streams and its total habitat length was only 12.9 miles (20.8 km). A variety of factors contributed to the dramatic decline in its population, including geographic isolation, habitat degradation, channelization of streams, over diversion, predation by brown trout (Salmo trutta), and hybridization with the Sacramento sucker (Catostomus occidentalis). However, after nearly three decades of relentless conservation efforts, the Modoc sucker, which is about 7 inches (180 mm) in length and lives up to five years, has emerged from the brink of extinction.

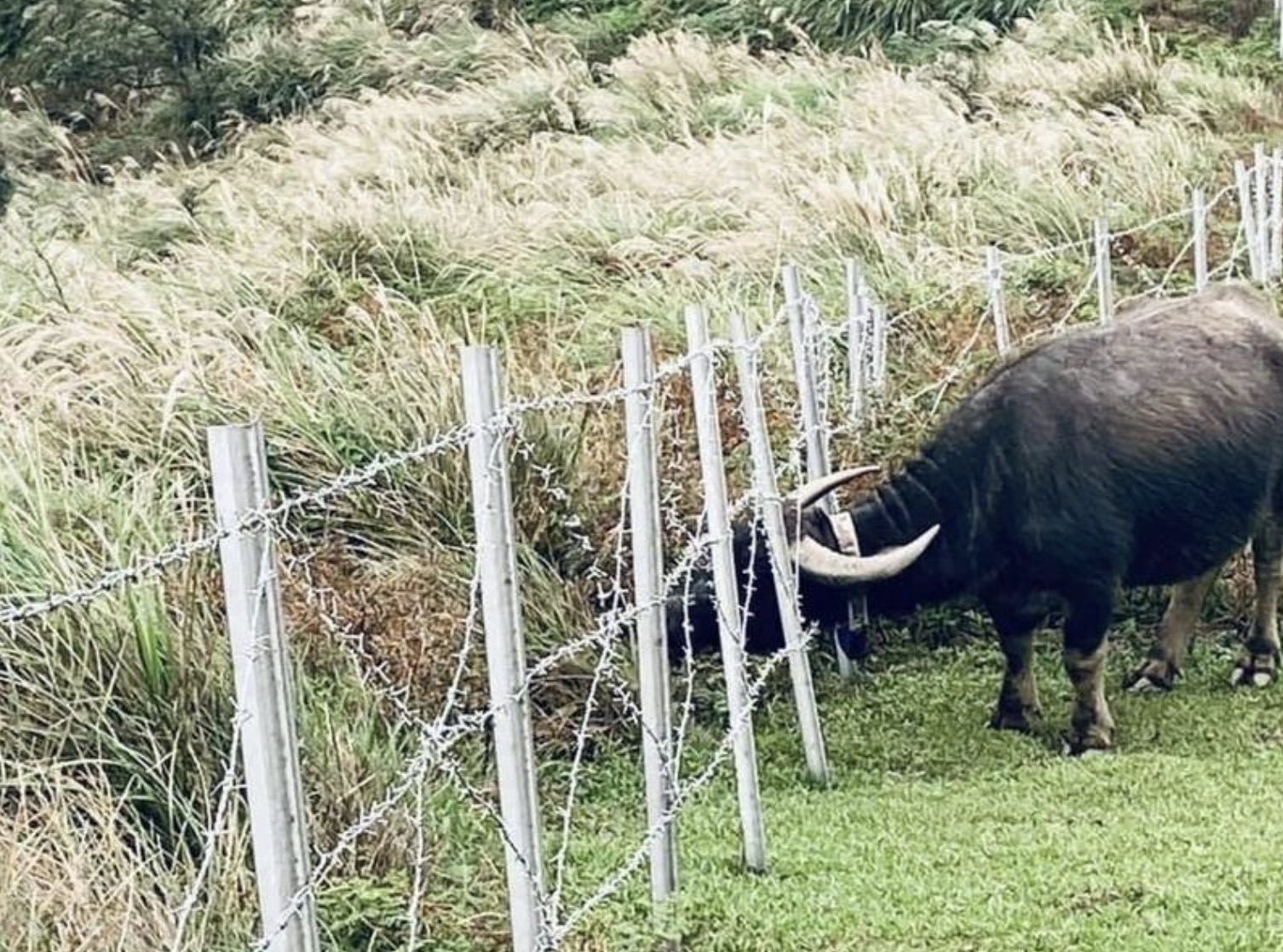
Construction of fences in riparian zones to prevent overgrazing

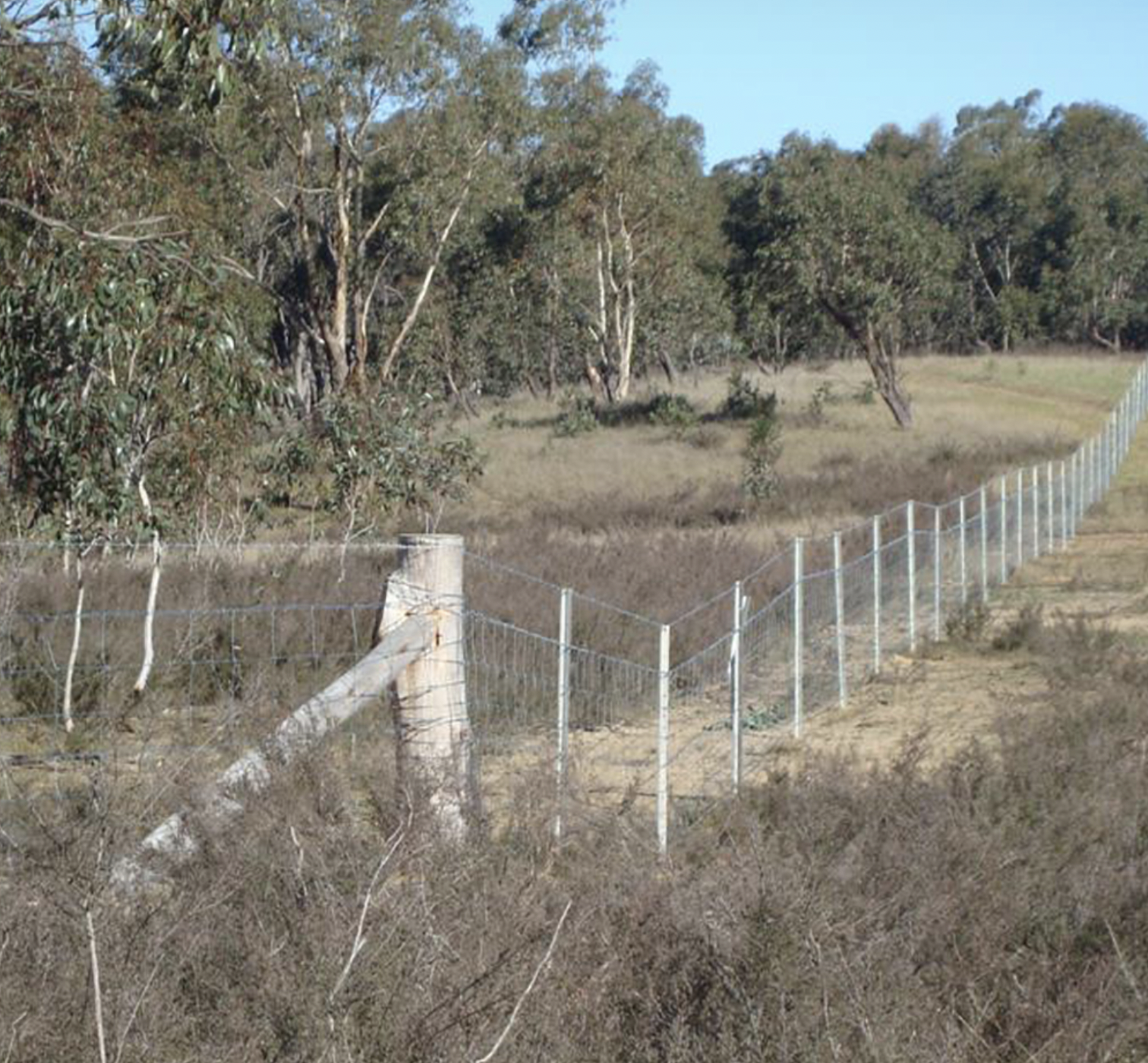
Fencing of riparian areas

A series of effective conservation measures taken by government departments, such as the construction of fences in riparian zones to prevent cattle grazing, have contributed significantly to the recovery of the Modoc sucker population.

Thanks to these conservation measures, the habitat of the Modoc sucker has now expanded to 12 streams totaling 42.5 miles, and in 2011, the International Union for Conservation of Nature (IUCN) listed it as "Near Threatened". In 2009 the United States Fish and Wildlife Service recommended the species be downlisted from endangered status to threatened status. More encouragingly, by 2016, the U.S. Fish and Wildlife Service had removed the species from its list of endangered and threatened species, signaling a significant conservation effort. The creeks supporting the fish are relatively healthy today. The range of the fish is not currently being reduced. The population size of this species has remained stable, showing a strong ability to adapt to the environment, indicating that its survival has stabilized. Although Introduced species of fish such as the largemouth bass are present, they do not pose a serious threat to the Modoc sucker.

== Other potential threats ==
=== Channelization ===
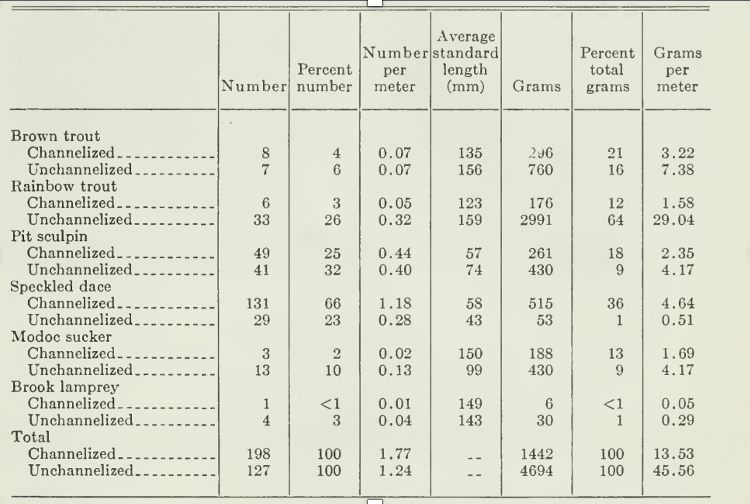
On the effects of channelized and unchannelized on the number of Modoc sucker

In 1973, channelization projects were initiated in some areas under the direction of the Soil Conservation Service to control flooding and streambank erosion. Such projects transformed streams that had been meandering with alternating pools and rapids into straight channels with continuous flow and high banks.

However, this initiative has had a serious impact on the Modoc sucker. Studies have shown that Modoc suckers were less numerous and smaller in channelized stream than in unchannelized streams, with a total biomass of less than one-third that of unchannelized streams.

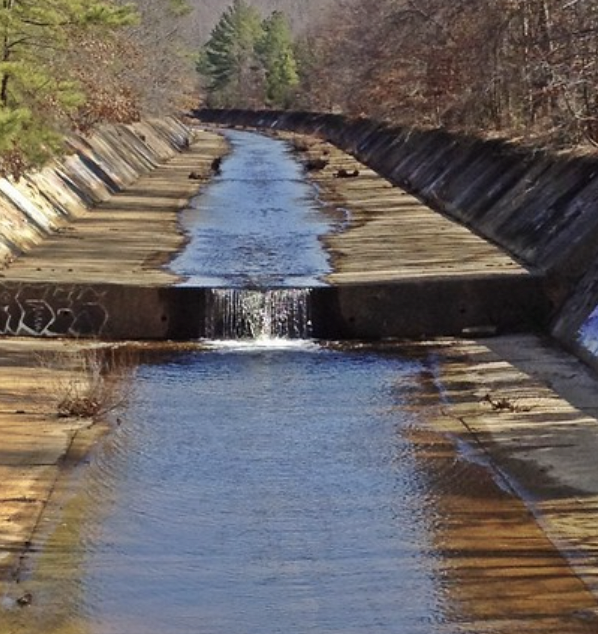
Example of Channelization.

Not only that, but channelization disrupted the fish food chain, with invertebrate biomass in stream samples from channelized sections being three times less than in samples from unchannelized sections, severely affecting the diet of Modoc sucker. Historical information shows that streams such as Rush Creek and Johnson Creek have been channelized, which not only destroys fish habitat, but also significantly reduces the overall productivity of the stream. While channelization has solved some of the problems in the short term, in the long term it has had a continuing negative impact on Modoc sucker and their habitat. Future channelization project of this magnitude should be weighed against the long-term ecological degradation it may cause, especially the potential impacts to native fish.

=== Climate change ===
Climate change presents a significant threat to the Modoc sucker's survival. Scientific research has identified this species as one of the 20 California native fish most at risk of extinction within the next century due to climate change, ranking 19th on the list of vulnerable species. The impacts of climate change are expected to be multifaceted, potentially leading to substantial habitat loss for the Modoc sucker. These changes may include diminished water resources, elevated water temperatures, and disrupted stream flow patterns, all of which could severely affect the species' ability to thrive. Compounding these challenges, the Modoc sucker faces intense competition from more adaptable non-native species, such as brown trout, largemouth bass, and brown bullhead catfish. These invasive species are often better equipped to handle changing environmental conditions, potentially outcompeting the Modoc sucker for resources and territory.

== Fishery and cultural significance ==
Historical data does not contain specific information about Modoc sucker's cultural significance. There is also no direct evidence of people using the Modoc sucker for fishing activities as it was previously listed as endangered by the IUCN.
