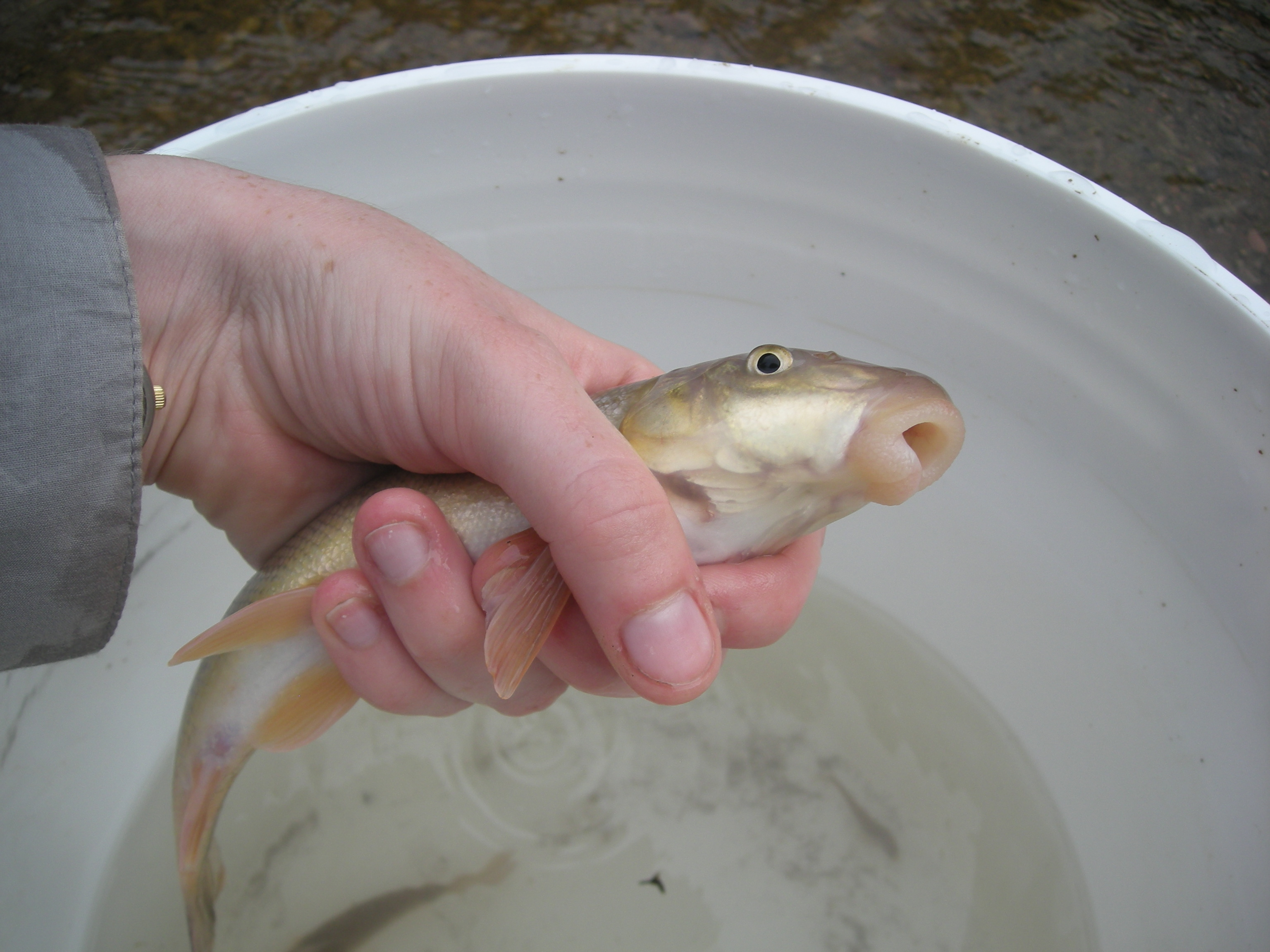

Conservation status
- Least Concern (IUCN 3.1)

- Vulnerable (NatureServe)

Scientific classification
- Kingdom: Animalia
- Phylum: Chordata
- Class: Actinopterygii
- Order: Cypriniformes
- Family: Catostomidae
- Genus: Catostomus
- Species: C. insignis

Binomial name
- Catostomus insignis S. F. Baird & Girard, 1854

= Sonora sucker =

Species of fish

The Sonora Sucker (or Gila Sucker), Catostomus insignis, is a medium-sized catostomid fish with 16 other species in the genus scattered throughout North America. This species is remarkably similar in appearance to the Yaqui Sucker (C. bernardini).

== Description ==
Sonora suckers have a fusiform body, with large heads and chubby figures. They have generally large lower lips, with no fleshy lobes. Sonora suckers have unique square dorsal fins, and relatively large scales (but fewer than most fish in the genus Catostomus). Their coloration is distinctly bi-colored, with a yellow underside and brownish dorsal side. Each scale has discrete outlines to form a definite spot. Adults can reach a length of 80 cm (31.5 in), and can weigh about 2 kg (4.4 lb).

== Range ==
The Sonora sucker occurs mainly in New Mexico and Arizona, also in northern Sonora, Mexico. This species is most prevalent in the Gila and Bill Williams river basins in Arizona, and common in the Gila and San Francisco drainages in New Mexico.

== Habitat ==
The Sonora sucker can live in an array of habitats, varying from trout streams to warm water rivers. However, these fish prefer rocky, relatively deep, and quiet waters. During daylight, adult Sonora suckers tend to take cover and stay in the shade.

== Diet ==
The Sonora sucker's main diet consists of tiny crustaceans, protozoans, and macroinvertebrates. Adult fish are omnivorous, and feed in the early morning and late evening.

== Reproduction ==
Two males usually follow a female Sonora sucker during breeding season. Females lay their eggs in riffles, or a patch of waves or ripples, and are incubated in the spaces between gravel. Females tend to deposit eggs in smaller streams, while few spawn in lakes. Spawning starts late in the winter and goes on until midsummer.

== Biology ==
Sonora suckers are often described as a very sedentary species even during rough seasonal changes and major floods. However, due to a high level of predation by the Flathead catfish (Pylodictis olivaris) in the Salt River Canyon, Sonora suckers are almost completely absent in the area.

== Conservation ==
Construction of reservoirs has greatly depleted the available habitat for the Sonora sucker. Excessive sand deposition in streams caused by watershed erosion has also affected the sucker's habitat. Two Arizona Game and Fish Departments have taken protective measures by undergoing studies that document the current population dynamics of the fish in two central Arizona rivers (Lower Salt and Lower Verde Rivers). The studies are used to increase awareness of the fish in the area and develop management plans.
