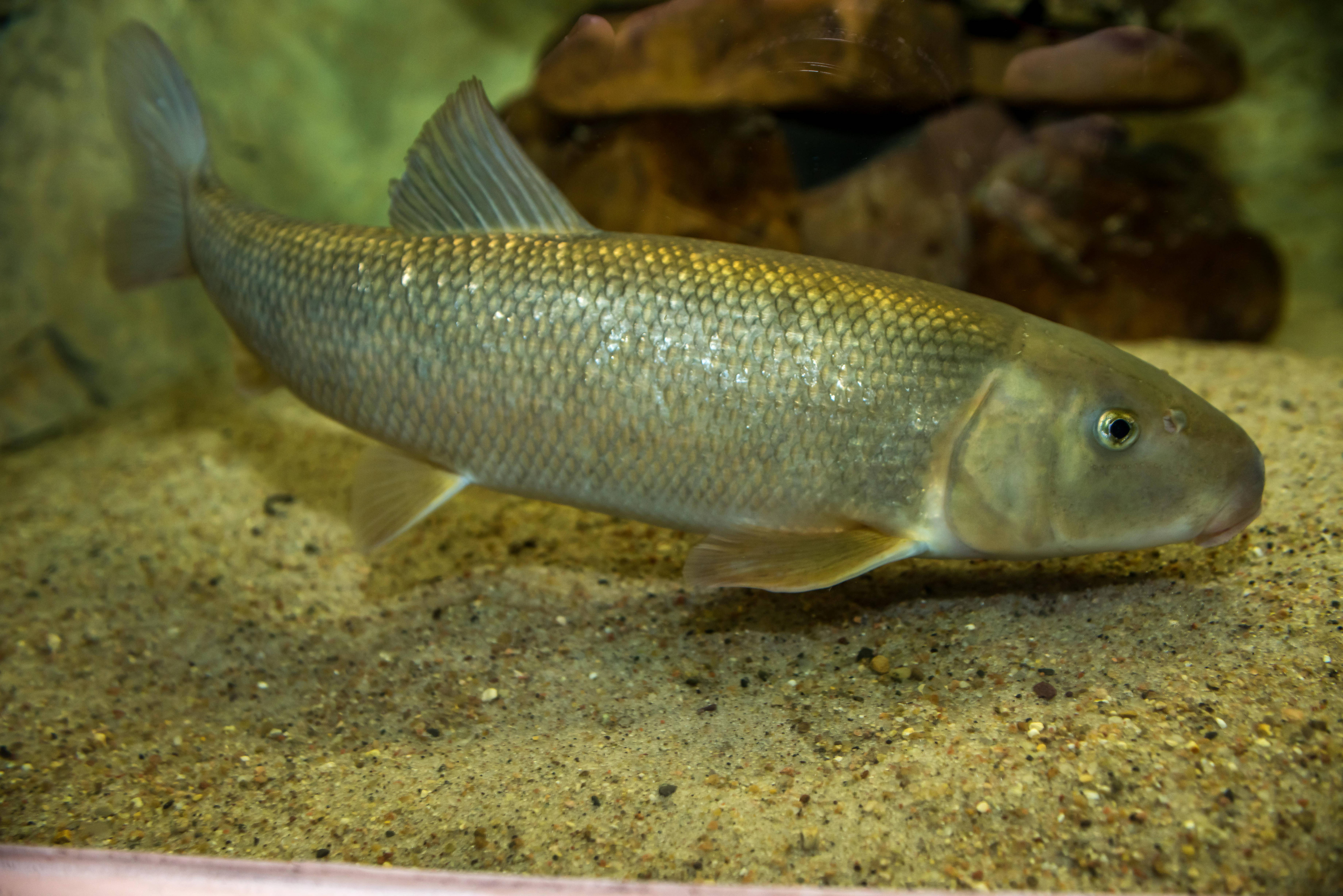
- White sucker (C. commersonii)

Scientific classification
- Kingdom: Animalia
- Phylum: Chordata
- Class: Actinopterygii
- Order: Cypriniformes
- Family: Catostomidae
- Subfamily: Catostominae
- Genus: Catostomus; Lesueur, 1817

Type species
- Cyprinus catostomus J. R. Forster, 1773

Species
- See text

= Catostomus =

Genus of fishes

Catostomus is a genus of fish belonging to the family Catostomidae, commonly known as suckers. This genus of fish usually lives in freshwater basins. Most members of the genus are native to North America, but C. catostomus is also found in Russia. A majority of species inhabit western North America, with only C. catostomus, C. commersonii, and C. utawana being found in eastern North America.

== Characteristics ==
The members of this genus have nearly cylindrical bodies. They have large, horizontal mouths, and their lips are very much papillose. They have complete lateral lines. They have from 54 to 124 scales, seven to 17 dorsal rays, usually seven anal rays, and 20 to 44 thin, unbranched rakers on their first gill arches. Their gas bladders have two chambers.

The young of many of the species in the genus have three dark grey blotches along their sides.

== Hybridization ==
Catostomus from different species of the genus are known to readily hybridize with each other. The fish was used as a study object by biologists, revealing that fish hybridization can vary greatly from place to place. Although different species of this fish are reproductively isolated under normal circumstances this isolating barrier disappears to a certain extent as the environment changes. In addition, in areas where backcross and hybridization were widespread, the scientists found offspring of recombinant hybrids with new ecological characteristics that made them more adapted to the local environment and even more competitive with native species. Hybridization between different species of Catostomus fish occurs on a large scale, which means that many different environmental factors are involved in these geographic areas. This pattern of hybridization is also an effective mechanism for species self-protection. Although the hybrid forms of Catostomus fish break the common reproductive isolation between species, related research results can help to lead the protection of the waters where Catostomus fish live.

== Species ==
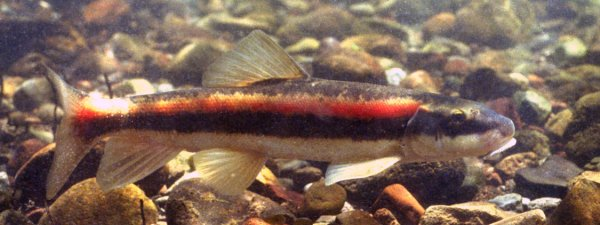
Suckers, such as this Tahoe sucker (C. tahoensis), can develop bright colors during the spawning season

Currently, 23 recognized species are in this genus:

- Catostomus ardens D. S. Jordan & C. H. Gilbert, 1881 (Utah sucker)
- Catostomus bernardini Girard, 1856 (Yaqui sucker)
- Catostomus cahita Siebert & W. L. Minckley, 1986 (Cahita sucker)
- Catostomus catostomus (J. R. Forster, 1773)
  - Catostomus catostomus catostomus (J. R. Forster, 1773) (Longnose sucker)
  - †C. c. cristatus (Cope, 1883)
  - C. c. lacustris (Bajkov, 1927) (Jasper longnose sucker)
- Catostomus columbianus (C. H. Eigenmann & R. S. Eigenmann, 1893) (Bridgelip sucker)
- Catostomus commersonii (Lacépède, 1803) (White sucker)
- Catostomus conchos (Meek, 1902)
- Catostomus fumeiventris R. R. Miller, 1973 (Owens sucker)
- Catostomus insignis Baird & Girard, 1854 (Sonora sucker)
- Catostomus latipinnis Baird & Girard, 1853 (flannelmouth sucker)
- Catostomus leopoldi Siebert & W. L. Minckley, 1986 (Bavispe sucker)
- Catostomus macrocheilus Girard, 1856 (largescale sucker)
- Catostomus microps Rutter, 1908 (Modoc sucker)
- Catostomus murivallis Harris, Markle & Campbell, 2025 (Wall Canyon sucker)
- Catostomus occidentalis Ayres, 1854
  - C. o. lacusanserinus Fowler, 1913 (Goose Lake sucker)
  - C. o. mnioltiltus Snyder, 1913 (Monterey sucker)
  - C. o. occidentalis Ayres, 1854 (Sacramento sucker)
- Catostomus rimiculus C. H. Gilbert & Snyder, 1898 (Klamath smallscale sucker)
- Catostomus rostratus (Tilesius, 1813)
- Catostomus snyderi C. H. Gilbert, 1898 (Klamath largescale sucker)
- Catostomus tahoensis T. N. Gill & D. S. Jordan, 1878 (Tahoe sucker)
- Catostomus tsiltcoosensis Evermann & Meek, 1898 (Tyee sucker)
- Catostomus utawana F. W. Mather, 1886 (Summer sucker)
- Catostomus warnerensis Snyder, 1908 (Warner sucker)
- Catostomus wigginsi Herre & Brock, 1936 (Opata sucker)

There are is also one candidate species:

- Elk Lake sucker (Carlson, Morse & Hekkala, 2015) which is sister to the white and summer suckers

The genus Pantosteus was formerly classified as a subgenus of Catostomus. However, more recent studies have found them to be a monophyletic group that forms a distinct clade from all other members of Catostomus, and they also have a different morphology and ecological preferences from Catostomus. Due to this, they are now treated as their own distinct genus.
