= Bavispe sucker =

Conservation status
- Vulnerable (IUCN 3.1)

Scientific classification
- Kingdom: Animalia
- Phylum: Chordata
- Class: Actinopterygii
- Order: Cypriniformes
- Family: Catostomidae
- Genus: Catostomus
- Species: C. leopoldi

Binomial name
- Catostomus leopoldi (Siebert & W. L. Minckley, 1986)

Species of fish

The Bavispe sucker, in Mexican matalote del Bavispe (Catostomus leopoldi), is a species of ray-finned fish in the family Catostomidae. It is found only in Mexico.

The fish is named in honor of the ecologist, environmentalist and author Aldo Leopold (1887-1948).
