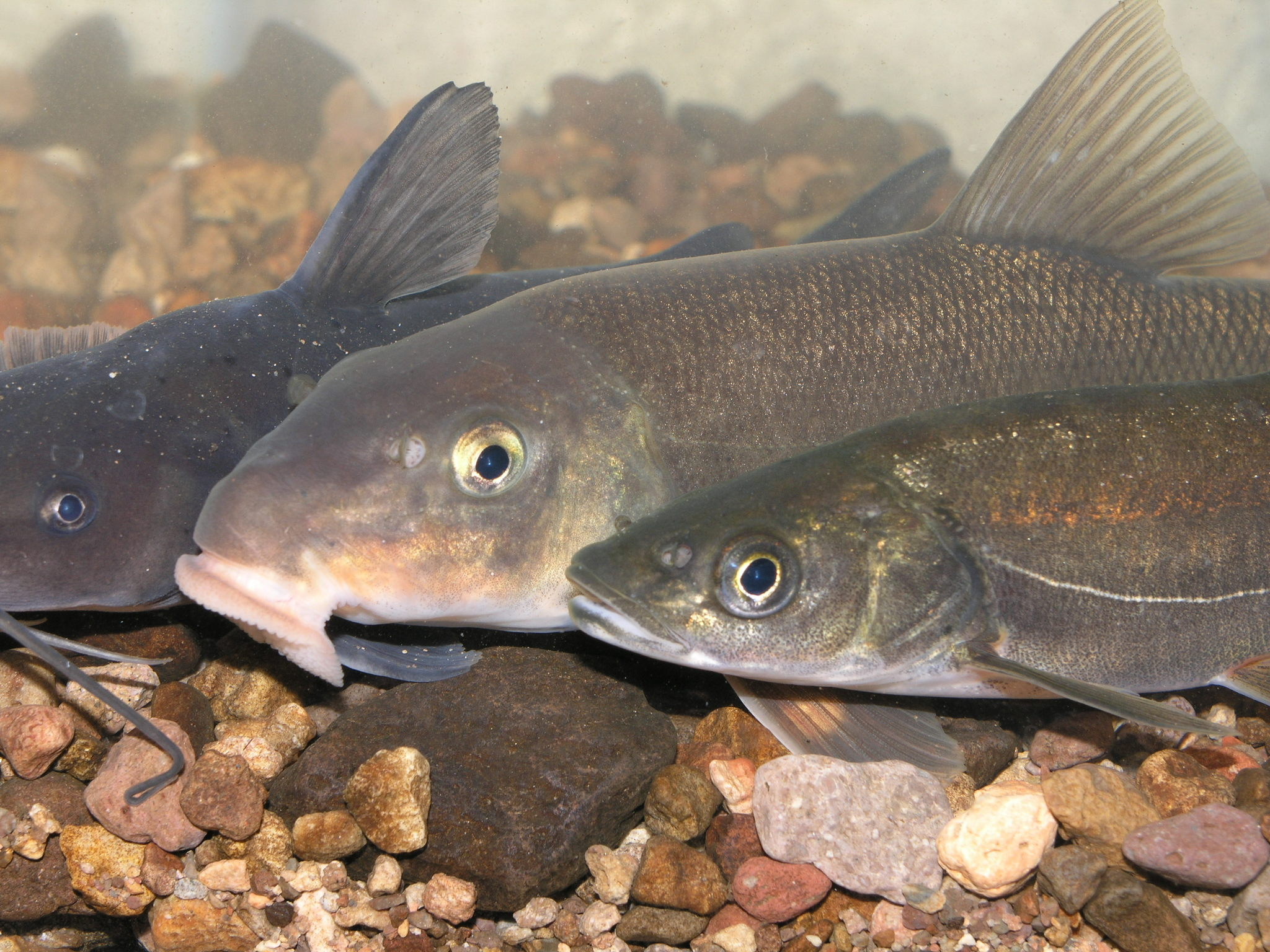
- Yaqui sucker in centre

Conservation status
- Least Concern (IUCN 3.1)

- Apparently Secure (NatureServe)

Scientific classification
- Kingdom: Animalia
- Phylum: Chordata
- Class: Actinopterygii
- Order: Cypriniformes
- Family: Catostomidae
- Genus: Catostomus
- Species: C. bernardini

Binomial name
- Catostomus bernardini Girard, 1856

= Yaqui sucker =

Species of fish

The Yaqui sucker (Catostomus bernardini) is a species of ray-finned fish in the family Catostomidae. It is found in the Aridoamerica region of northern Mexico and south-western United States. Catostomus bernardini or Yaqui sucker belongs to the family Catostomidae. The Yaqui sucker is related to the Sonora sucker and could possibly be a subspecies of the Gila sucker.

== Description ==
The Yaqui sucker's body is fusiform and somewhat elongated, with relatively large head and eyes. The lips can be distinguished in that they are less fleshy than other Arizona suckers. The high dorsal fin has twelve fin rays. Anal, pelvic, and dorsal fins are all particularly larger in males than females. Laterally lined scales usually numbering between 62 and 73 mark the body of this sucker, and its head is counter shaded light below and dark above. The dorsal and caudal fins are dark, with other fins being either white or yellow. The Yaqui sucker can be easily mistaken with its close relative, Catostomus insignis, unless the fin rays are counted.

== Distribution in Arizona ==
This particular species of sucker can be found in a variety of places within the southwest, ranging from the Yaqui River in Mexico, to the Cajon Bonito south of Douglas in Cochise County. Since 1978, populations have decreased drastically with little recovery. They have completely disappeared from San Bernardino Creek, and The Endangered Species Act is currently trying to protect those in Cochise County. Most have been extirpated since 1968.

== Habitat ==
The widespread elevation change in this species allows for a variety of habitats. The Yaqui sucker has a wide-ranging thermal tolerance that allows it to inhabit aquatic systems from the lowest desert streams to the highest of mountain brooks, in all biotic communities from desert scrub up to and including semi-desert grassland. The Arizona biomes restrict the Yaqui sucker to mud-bottomed pools, which must be surrounded by riparian vegetation. In Mexico, however, the sucker prefers gravel-bottomed pools and streams. The gravel areas of the Yaqui River provide a more beneficial spawning area for the Yaqui sucker.

== Reproduction and biology ==
Spawning will usually take place early in the calendar year, particularly March and April due to specific water temperature preferences. During these periods the males will turn blue, while the females remain a yellowish brown. Juvenile suckers will immediately have exponential growth spurts, reaching 75% of their full length within the first year. Heavy predation and sexual selection could be contributing to these trends in growth. Little else is known about the reproductive habits and parental characteristics of this particular species of sucker, probably because federal permits to study endangered species are difficult to obtain. Suckers prefer fast and shallow runs during flooding seasons, and will retreat to slower and deeper pools during droughts. Suckers eat by pulling food off of the bottom of streams; therefore a heavy amount of sediment discharge is needed. This is why the loss of wetlands and environmental pressures are so detrimental to the sucker. Wetland loss and lack of sediment discharge/recharge are strongly correlated to the disappearance of the species.

== Conservation ==
Arizona placed the Yaqui sucker on the Endangered species list in 1988, and little has been done to recover their numbers. Aquifer pumping, reduction in stream flows, and predation from non-native green sunfish, are all major contributing factors to the decline of the species according to NatureServe (2002). The San Bernardino Ranch has current plans to reintroduce individuals in attempt to recharge the population, and other projects involve federal habitat preservation. Dexter National Fish Hatchery has had the most success, because they have developed an effective method for reintroducing the species, and providing the criteria for spawning.
