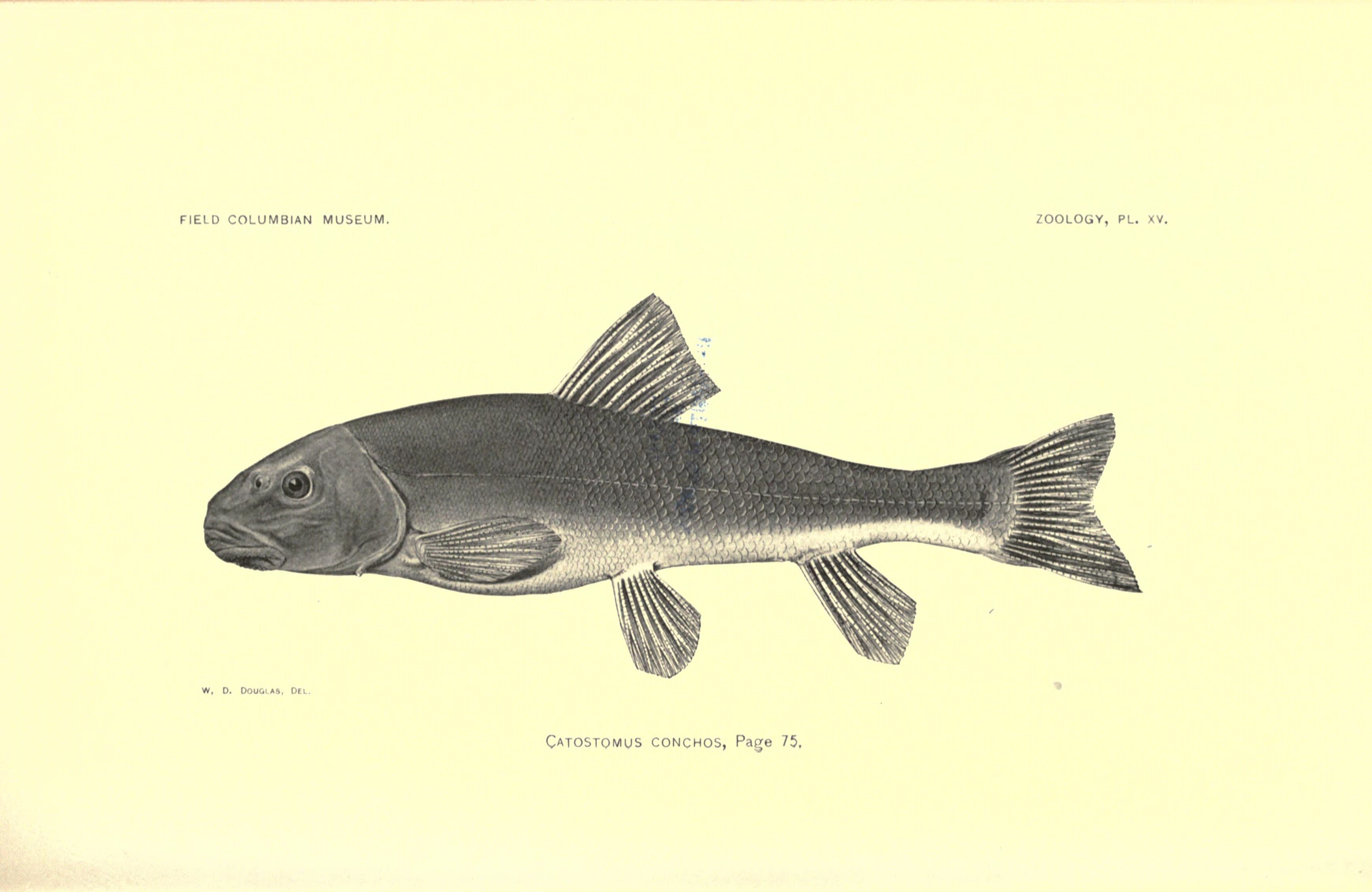
- Illustration

Conservation status
- Vulnerable (IUCN 2.3)

Scientific classification
- Kingdom: Animalia
- Phylum: Chordata
- Class: Actinopterygii
- Order: Cypriniformes
- Family: Catostomidae
- Genus: Catostomus
- Species: C. conchos

Binomial name
- Catostomus conchos Meek, 1902

= Catostomus conchos =

Species of fish

Catostomus conchos, the Matalote conchos, is a species of ray-finned fish in the family Catostomidae. It is found only in Mexico.
