= Opata sucker =

Conservation status
- Vulnerable (IUCN 3.1)

Scientific classification
- Kingdom: Animalia
- Phylum: Chordata
- Class: Actinopterygii
- Order: Cypriniformes
- Family: Catostomidae
- Genus: Catostomus
- Species: C. wigginsi

Binomial name
- Catostomus wigginsi Herre & Brock, 1936

Species of fish

The Opata sucker, Sonoran sucker or matalote Opata (Catostomus wigginsi), is a species of freshwater ray-finned fish in the family Catostomidae, the suckers. This species is found only in Mexico.

== Taxonomy ==
The Opata sucker was first formally described in 1936 by the American biologists Albert William Herre and Vernon E. Brock with its type locality given as the west fork of Río San Miguel, 8 km (5.0 mi) northwest of Cucurpe, and 47 km (29 mi) south-east of Magdalena, Sonora, Mexico, from an elevation of elevation of around 786 m (2,579 ft). This species is classified in the genus Catostomus which is the type genus of the subfamily Catostominae, and thus of the family Catostomidae. The family Catostomidae is classified within the suborder Catostomoidei in the order Cypriniformes.

== Etymology ==
The Optata sucker is classified in the genus Catostomus, a name which combines the Greek katá, which means "under", "below" or "beneath", and stóma, which means "mouth". The type species of this genus is Cyprinus catastomus and when Leseuer proposed this genus he made it tautonymous. The specific name honors the American botanist Ira Loren Wiggins, who collected rare Mexican fishes for the Zoological Museum of Stanford Museum, including the holotype of this species.

== Distribution and habitat ==
The Opata sucker is endemic to the Sonora river basin in Sonora, Mexico including the Sonora and San Miguel rivers. The southern limit of its distribution is considered to be the town of Gavilan on the Sonora River. Their habitat includes the desert marshes, locally called cienegas, and small to moderately-sized streams, in shady pools and riffles, where the current is moderately fast and there is vegetation.

== Conservation ==
The Opata sucker is classified as Vulnerable by the International Union for Conservation of Nature because of its restricted range which is subject to habitat loss and degradation due to over-abstraction, damming, pollution, deforestation, damage from livestock and invasive species.

== Sources ==
- Froese, Rainer; Pauly, Daniel (eds.). "Catostomus wigginsi". FishBase.
