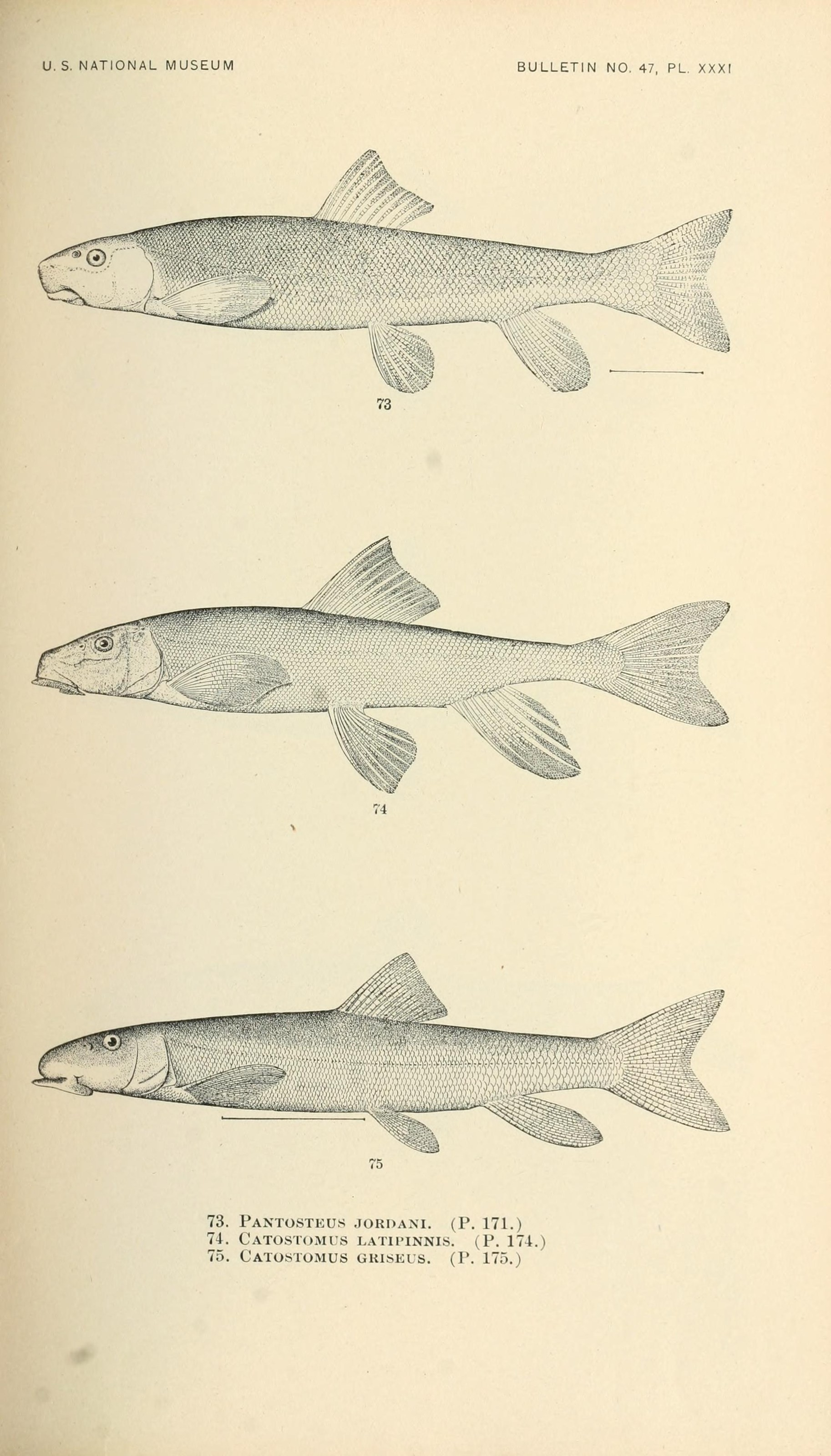
- Catostomus latipinnis (central) with Pantosteus jordani above it and Catostomus griseus below. From US National Museum bulletin 47

Conservation status
- Least Concern (IUCN 3.1)

Scientific classification
- Kingdom: Animalia
- Phylum: Chordata
- Class: Actinopterygii
- Order: Cypriniformes
- Family: Catostomidae
- Genus: Catostomus
- Species: C. latipinnis

Binomial name
- Catostomus latipinnis S. F. Baird & Girard, 1853

= Catostomus latipinnis =

Flannelmouth sucker

Species of fish

Catostomus latipinnis (flannelmouth sucker) is a North American fish identified by its enlarged lower lips. It belongs to the genus Catostomus, commonly known as suckers. Historically, the flannelmouth sucker ranged in the Colorado River Basin, including parts of Wyoming, Utah, Colorado, New Mexico, Nevada, California, and Arizona; however, this species has been entirely extirpated from the Gila River Basin in Arizona.

== Description ==
The flannelmouth sucker's body is long, starting with a thick anterior that moves down to a thin posterior; respectively, this causes the head to be relatively short and thick. The lower lips are noticeably bulky, with thick and fleshy lobes. In addition, the flannelmouth sucker has large fins, but relatively small scales. Flannelmouth suckers are classified as benthic fish, spending most of their time near the river floor where they forage for food. Young fish are usually silvery-colored all over, but adults have a typical light gray or tan coloration (often with a lighter underside). Strangely, no bright colors have been found in populations of this species in Arizona, but are found in those from the Colorado basin. Adult fish can also grow to a length of 26 inches and weigh about 8 pounds. It is one of the largest of all suckers.

== Range ==
The flannelmouth sucker can be found in parts of Wyoming, Utah, Colorado, New Mexico, Nevada, California, and Arizona. In Arizona, this species is found in the Colorado River and its larger tributaries. In the mid 1970s, the Arizona Game and Fish Department introduced the fish below the Davis Dam, and the population still persists today. It is extinct in California although strays from the reintroduced Nevada population are occasionally caught in the Californian Colorado River.

== Habitat ==
While flannelmouth suckers are restricted to larger rivers, its larvae tend to live in shallow areas. Larvae also like deeper water when they are not feeding. In addition, adult suckers prefer great amounts of cover and shade during the daytime.

== Diet ==
This species is known to eat inorganic material, planktonic organisms such as copepods, filamentous algae and other macroinvertebrates; this was discovered by examining the stomach contents of flannelmouth sucker larvae.

== Reproduction ==
Breeding season for the flannelmouth sucker occurs in the months of March through July. In Arizona, the fish tend to "run" upstream specifically to spawn, and then immediately leave towards the mainstream. Flannelmouth suckers, when ready to reproduce, seek out a tributary or more shallow area for spawning. Here the females release their eggs onto a rocky surface where the eggs can then fertilized by waterborne sperm from the males. After being fertilized, the eggs sink to the lake floor or into a crevice within surrounding rocks. Once hatched the larvae move along with the current while maturing. Fins of both sexes often become orange during reproduction.

== Conservation ==
The flannelmouth sucker is an unprotected species—although not entirely endangered, the species faces many threats. These threats include alterations of river habitats (thermal and hydrologic) caused by hydroelectric dams; blockage of migration; and predation by introduced organisms. In Arizona, the Grand Canyon Protection Act of 1992 reduced the random fluctuation of water releases from the nearby dam in Glen Canyon, and is still enforced today. The flannelmouth sucker has a high sensitivity to water quality and environment status, the health of the flannelmouth sucker population is representative of the condition of its environment. The flannelmouth sucker has thus been designated as the indicator species for the Green River and the San Juan River.
