= Catostomus cahita =

Conservation status
- Least Concern (IUCN 3.1)

Scientific classification
- Kingdom: Animalia
- Phylum: Chordata
- Class: Actinopterygii
- Order: Cypriniformes
- Family: Catostomidae
- Genus: Catostomus
- Species: C. cahita

Binomial name
- Catostomus cahita (Siebert & W. L. Minckley, 1986)

Species of fish

Catostomus cahita, cited as the cahita sucker or matalote cahita, is a species of freshwater fish in the family Catostomidae. It is found only in Mexico.
