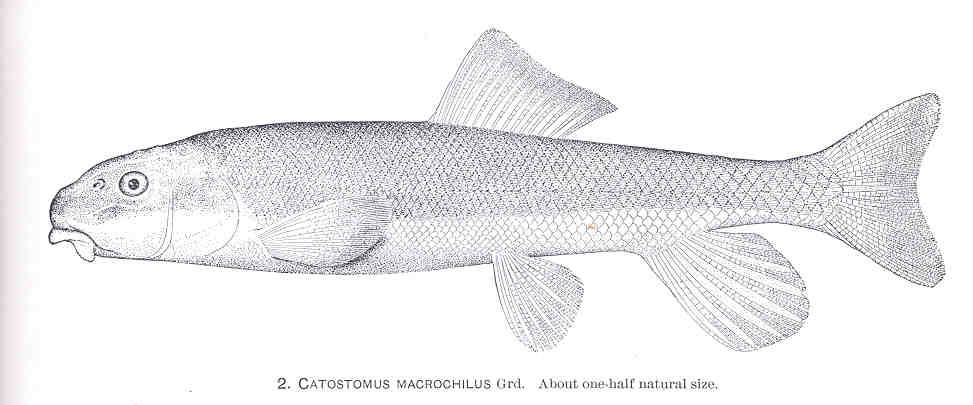

Conservation status
- Least Concern (IUCN 3.1)

Scientific classification
- Kingdom: Animalia
- Phylum: Chordata
- Class: Actinopterygii
- Order: Cypriniformes
- Family: Catostomidae
- Genus: Catostomus
- Species: C. macrocheilus

Binomial name
- Catostomus macrocheilus Girard, 1856

= Largescale sucker =

Species of fish

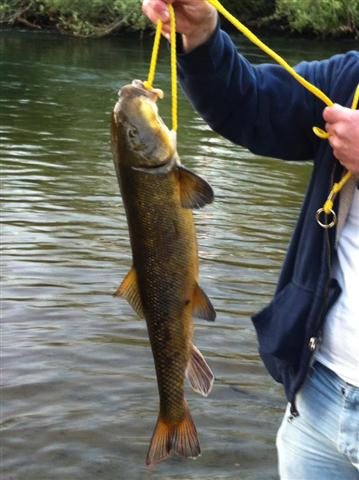
Catostomus macrocheilus

The largescale sucker (Catostomus macrocheilus) is a species of sucker, a type of freshwater fish, found in western North America.

== Description ==
It has a rounded snout with a downturned mouth on its underside (as opposed to a mouth at end of the head like most fish). It has large scales and narrow tail base (caudal peduncle).

Juveniles are under 4 in (10 cm) in length. Adults can reach a length of 24 in (61 cm) and 7 lb (3.2 kg) in parts of their range. Juveniles are mottled brown or olive green with dark spots and white to yellow belly. Adults are bronze to orange on top with lighter undersides.

== Distribution and habitat ==
The largescale sucker is native to the Pacific Northwest, occurring from British Columbia south to Oregon. It is widespread in the Columbia River system. It occurs in the slower-moving portions of rivers and streams, and in lakes.

== Biology ==
Largescale suckers spawn in the spring in shallow water over sandy areas of streams or the sandy or small gravel shoals of lakes. Females may produce up to 20,000 adhesive eggs. The young feed upon small zooplankton until they become bottom dwellers. Then they feed on benthic aquatic invertebrates, diatoms, and other plant material. They are an important part of the food web and the diet of fish-eating animals (such as osprey, eagles, river otters, and other fish).

== Angling and relationship with humans ==
Largescale suckers, and rough fish in general, have been used as scapegoats for human impacts on fisheries. Ignorance about suckers is widespread and many anglers in the Pacific Northwest kill them because they mistakenly believe them to have a negative impact on salmon and trout stocks. The International Game Fish Association all tackle world record stands at 7 lb 14 oz (3.6 kg) caught in Grand View, Idaho. However the Idaho state record sits at 9 lb (4.1 kg) and a 27.7 in (70 cm) fish stands as the catch and release record. The Idaho state record was caught in 2017 from Lake Cascade while ice fishing.
