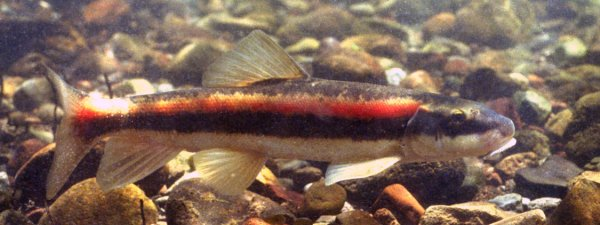

Conservation status
- Least Concern (IUCN 3.1)

Scientific classification
- Kingdom: Animalia
- Phylum: Chordata
- Class: Actinopterygii
- Order: Cypriniformes
- Family: Catostomidae
- Genus: Catostomus
- Species: C. tahoensis

Binomial name
- Catostomus tahoensis T. N. Gill & D. S. Jordan, 1878
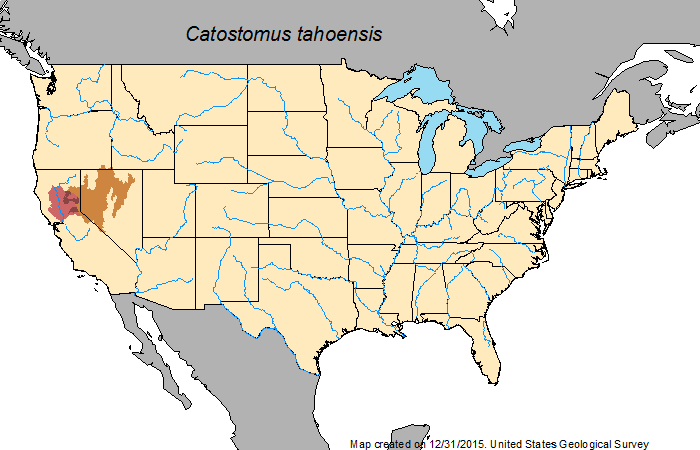
- Known watershed locations of Catostomus tahoensis

Synonyms
- Catostomus arenarius Snyder, 1917; Chasmistes chamberlaini Rutter, 1903

= Tahoe sucker =

Species of fish

The Tahoe sucker (Catostomus tahoensis) is a freshwater cypriniform fish inhabiting the Great Basin region of the Western United States.

== Description ==
The Tahoe sucker is a large, long fish with a tapering head. It can grow up to 24 inches (610 mm) in larger lakes, but rarely exceeds 6 inches (152.4 mm) in streams. Its rather large suckermouth is located on the bottom of the head, commonly referred to as a subterminal mouth. Where its lower lips are thick and fleshy, its upper lips contain 2–4 rows of papillae. The caudal fin is moderately forked. There are 83 to 87 scales in the lateral line. They are very dark above, lighter below, with dusky fins. Breeding males display a bright red lateral line and breeding tubercles on the anal fin and tail.

== Distribution and habitat ==
These fish are native to the Lahontan Basin of southeastern Oregon, Nevada, and northeastern California, and southwestern Idaho, as seen in the image below.

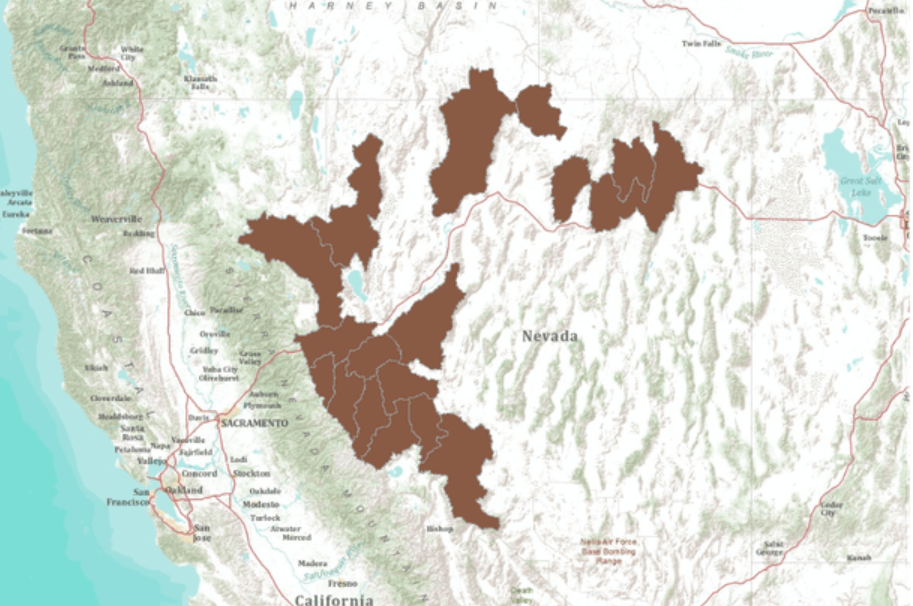
A map of the watershed basins where Tahoe sucker are found.

The Tahoe sucker is one of the most common fishes found in the Lahontan Basin, making up a majority of the native fish populations. It has also been introduced into the upper Sacramento River system. The total adult population is believed to number over 100,000, and it is considered to be common or abundant in its various habitats.

The Tahoe sucker is considered a stream generalist, however it reaches its greatest size and numbers in lakes and reservoirs. They are predominantly found in cool streams, but are capable of withstanding temperatures of around 25 °C (77 °F).

In Lakes, Suckers may grow to exceed 60 centimetres (24 in) in length, compared to 15 centimetres (5.9 in) in streams. Suckers are able to grow to such larger sizes in lakes by feeding along the bottom of the lake, sometimes as deep as 300 metres (980 ft). Adults occupy moderate to deeper depths. Young are found in shallow waters or tributary streams, where water travels slower.

=== Occupied watersheds ===
- East Branch North Fork Feather Watershed
- East Walker Watershed
- Honey-Eagle Lakes Watershed
- Lake Tahoe Watershed
- Middle Fork Feather Watershed
- North Fork American Watershed
- North Fork Feather Watershed
- Truckee Watershed
- Upper Carson Watershed
- West Walker Watershed

== Diet habits ==
The Trophic position of Tahoe suckers within Cascade Lake indicates a primarily small organism based-diet. Tahoe suckers are omnivorous, and feed on a mix of algae, detritus, and various forms of invertebrates. Suckers typically feed at night time, in order to avoid predation from larger fish such as Lake Trout. While Suckers are still juvenile they feed on Cladocera's and small organisms found in or around algae.

== Reproduction ==
Most male suckers mature at two years old, and all are mature at age three. The majority of female suckers reach maturity at three years of age, however a few reach maturity at two. Differences in age at which maturity is reached exist between various populations. Those in Pyramid Lake mature several years earlier than those in Lake Tahoe. Most individuals, regardless of population, were between 212 and 324 millimetres (8.3 and 12.8 in) long at the onset of sexual maturity. This data showcases that both size and age influence sexual maturity, however size seems to have the larger influence.

Fecundity is believed to be related to size, with age being of secondary influence. Nuptial tubercles begin to appear on both sexes prior to the onset of the mating season, although they are rare on females. On males they form distinct rows on the anal and caudal fins.

In lakes, the Tahoe sucker prefers to spawn over rock and gravel substrates when water temperatures are 12–23 °C (54–73 °F). Stream dwelling suckers move upstream to riffles at night when water temperatures are 11–14 °C (52–57 °F). After scattering her eggs into the gravel bed, the female shakes them down into the substrate. Simultaneously, the attendant males release their sperm in order to fertilize the released eggs.

Assuming the average body length is 31 cm (12 in) FL, an average of lake suckers is 20,555 eggs. Fewer eggs are produced in female stream dwelling suckers. Sustained seasons of increased water level can lead to a higher yield in eggs, as the high water helps maintain a protective environment for larval and post-larval suckers.

== Relation to other fish species ==
Tahoe suckers are one of the main sources of food for Lake Trout within Lake Tahoe. Lake Trout tend to feed on a multitude of different species, including sculpins, Cladocera, and suckers. As the weight of Lake Trout increases they tend to primarily feed on the Tahoe sucker, as Tahoe suckers comprise the greatest proportion of food items found within the stomach of Lake Trout larger than 19.9 inches (510 mm). In 1960, Mysis diluviana populations were introduced to the Lake Tahoe ecosystem. This led to an increase in Lake Trout populations due to the abundance of a new prey resource. This led to an increase in predation of forage fishes, including the Tahoe sucker, by the Lake Trout.

The Tahoe sucker shares morphological similarities with the mountain sucker (Pantosteus platyrhynchus) and even co-occur in Sagehen Creek, as well as other streams in the Lahontan drainage basin. Despite their morphological similarities, these two suckers differ in trophic specializations as well as spatial habitats. The Tahoe and mountain suckers tend to segregate, with the mountain sucker being more abundant in upper stream reaches and the Tahoe sucker being more abundant in lower stream reaches.

The Tahoe sucker can have two variations within its scales, with some members of the species having fine scales and some having coarse scales. The coarse scale variation of the Tahoe sucker was originally thought to be an entirely separate species, known as Catostomus arenarius. However, it was determined that this newfound "species" was simply based on large, coarse scale variants of Catostomus tahoensis. Since 1951, Catostomus arenarius has become a synonym with Catostomus tahoensis for the Tahoe sucker.

== Importance to humans ==
Historically, the Tahoe sucker was largely ignored by the indigenous Paiute peoples, who preferred Cutthroat trout and Cui-ui sucker. Despite the fish's size and good taste, it continues to have no economic significance.

Due to being bottom feeders, lake dwelling Tahoe suckers are hard to access. Additionally, those living in streams tend to be significantly smaller and less substantive for food than lake dwelling suckers. There are no fisheries tailored to them.

In terms of recreation, the Tahoe sucker is considered a non-game fish and is largely ignored by fishermen in the Lake Tahoe area. In a census of Nevada fishermen, only game fish were encountered, and Tahoe suckers were reported in very few cases.

== Conservation status ==
The Tahoe sucker was most recently assessed in 2011, where it received a rating of Least Concern (LC) for the IUCN Red List.

This rating of Least Concern is mostly due to the lack of knowledge surrounding anthropogenic impacts in the Lahontan Basin. There is little known about the population ecology of the native species found in the Basin, including the Tahoe sucker. Therefore, the impact of anthropogenic disturbance on the long term population viability of these species, including climate change, is relatively unknown.
