= Turner Creek =

Stream in Wisconsin, U.S.

Coordinates: 44°22′01″N 90°15′06″W

Turner Creek is a stream in the U.S. state of Wisconsin. It is a tributary to the East Fork Black River.

Turner Creek has the name of a pioneer landowner.
