= Ice fishing =

Winter activity of catching fish in frozen-over bodies of water

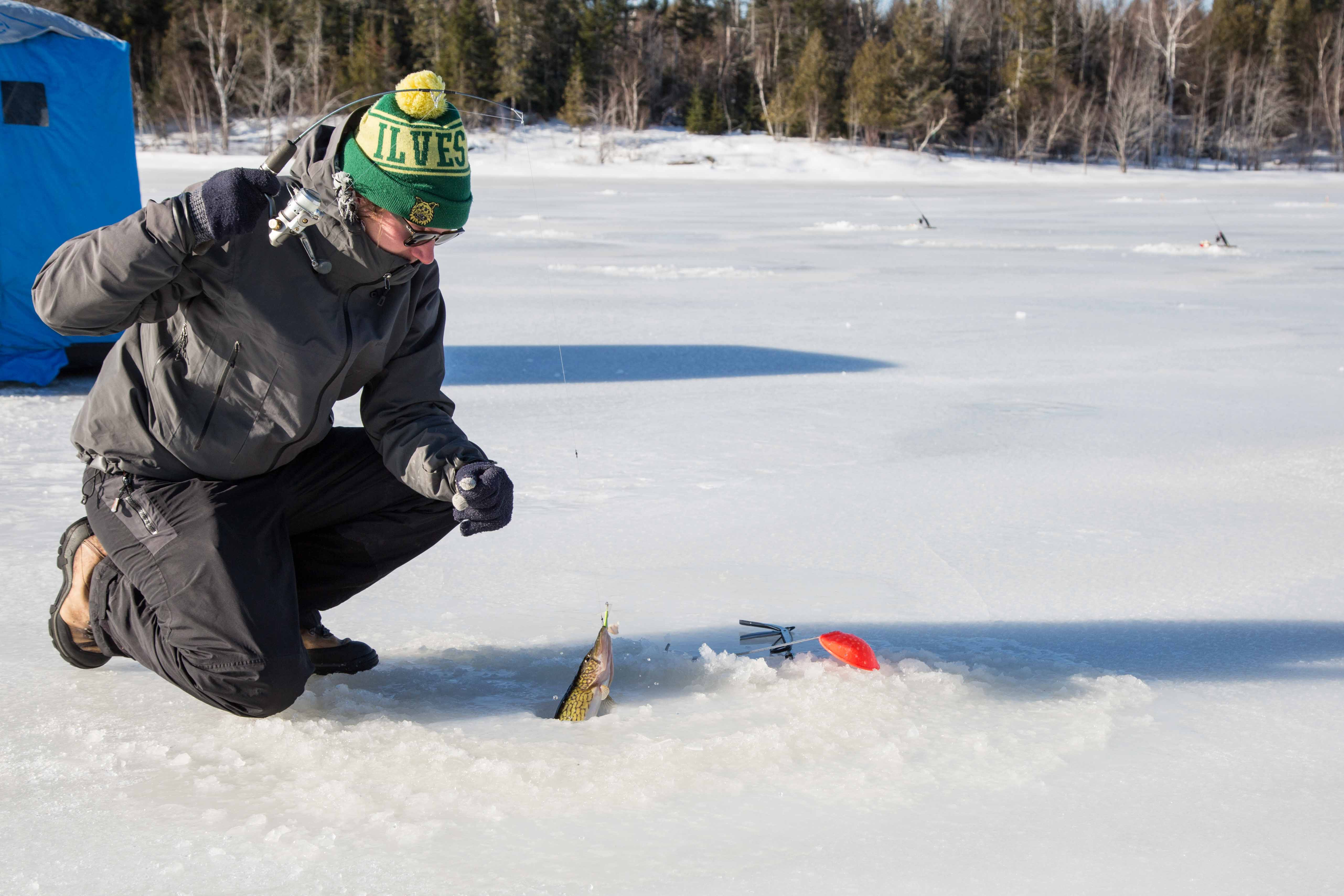
An ice fisher reels in a chain pickerel

Ice fishing is the practice of catching fish with lines and fish hooks or spears through an opening in the ice on a frozen body of water. Ice fishers may fish in the open or in heated enclosures, some with bunks and amenities.

== History ==
Long before it was considered a form of recreation, ice fishing "was a matter of survival". Archeological findings of tools and equipment across those Arctic regions show the ubiquity and sophistication of the practice among these early communities. Arctic communities have used under-ice net fishing since the last ice age, with the Antrea Net in Karelia – the oldest archaeological net found in the world – being over 10,000 years old.

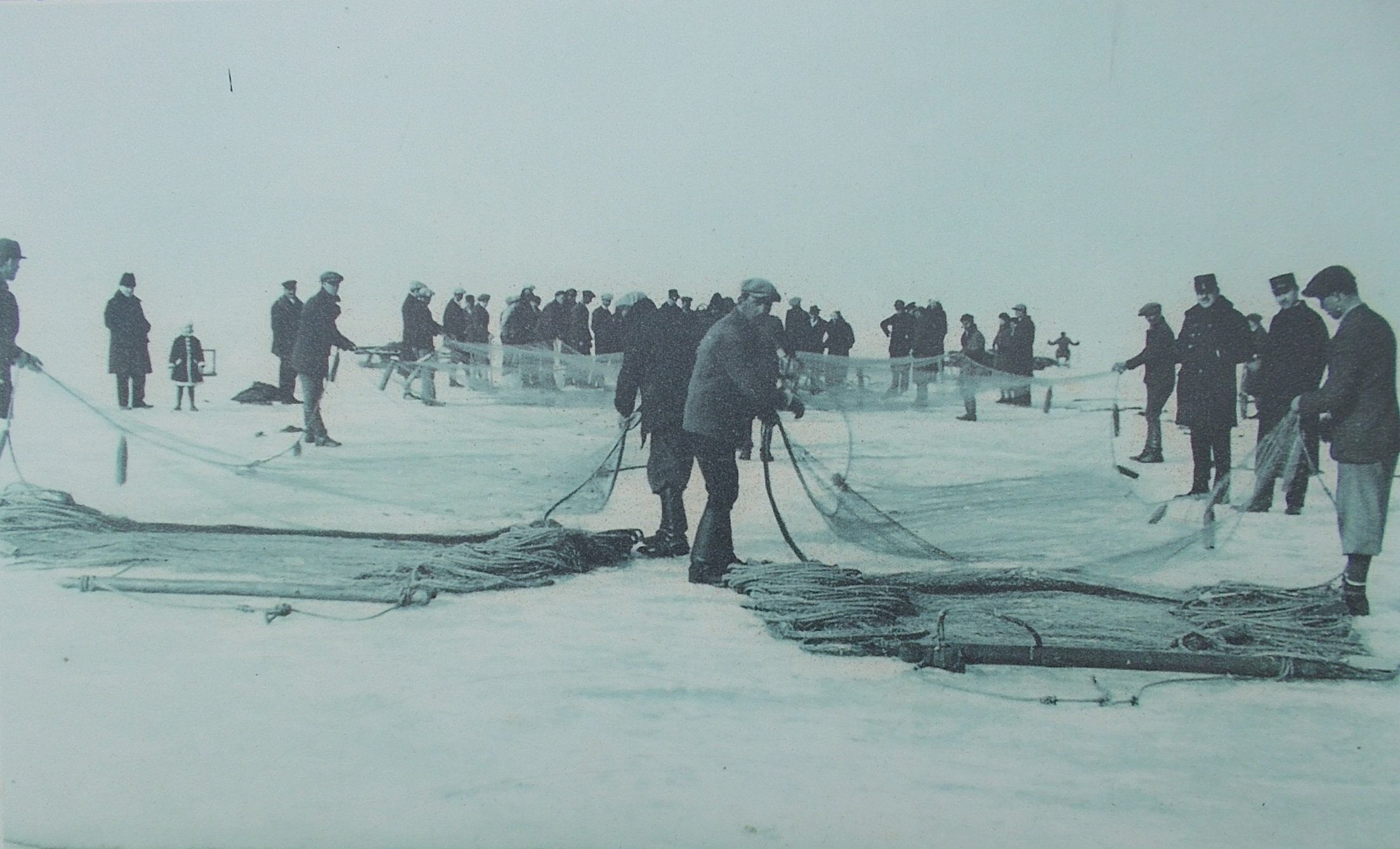
Winter ice fishing in Fonyod, Hungary (1910)

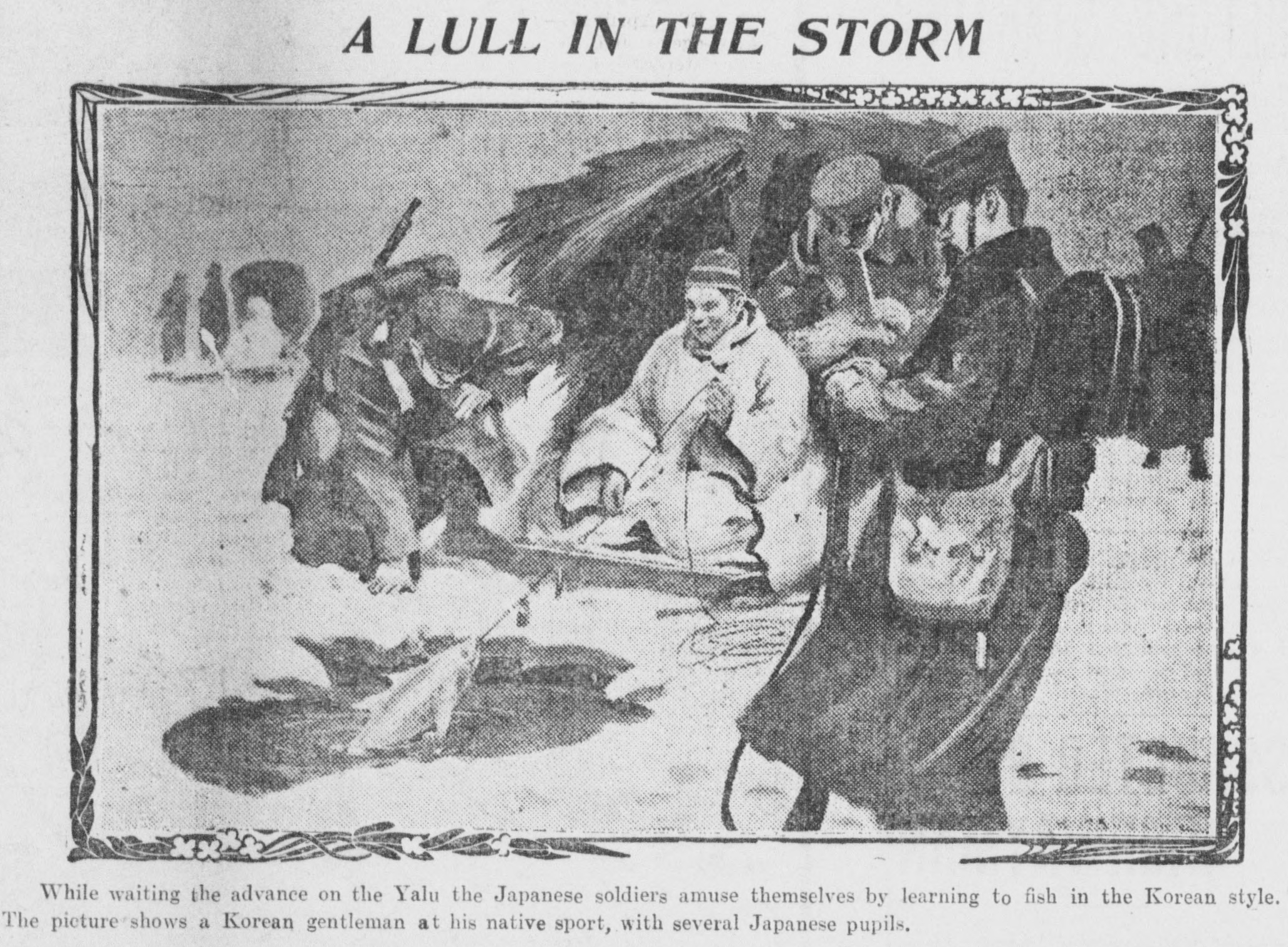
Korean aristocrat teaching Japanese soldiers to ice fish on the Yalu River (1904)

For First Nation communities in Canada, ice fishing remains a way to have access to traditional food, and an important source of nutrients.

The Ojibwe people of northern Ontario were among the first to rely on ice fishing as a source of food.

== Shelters ==
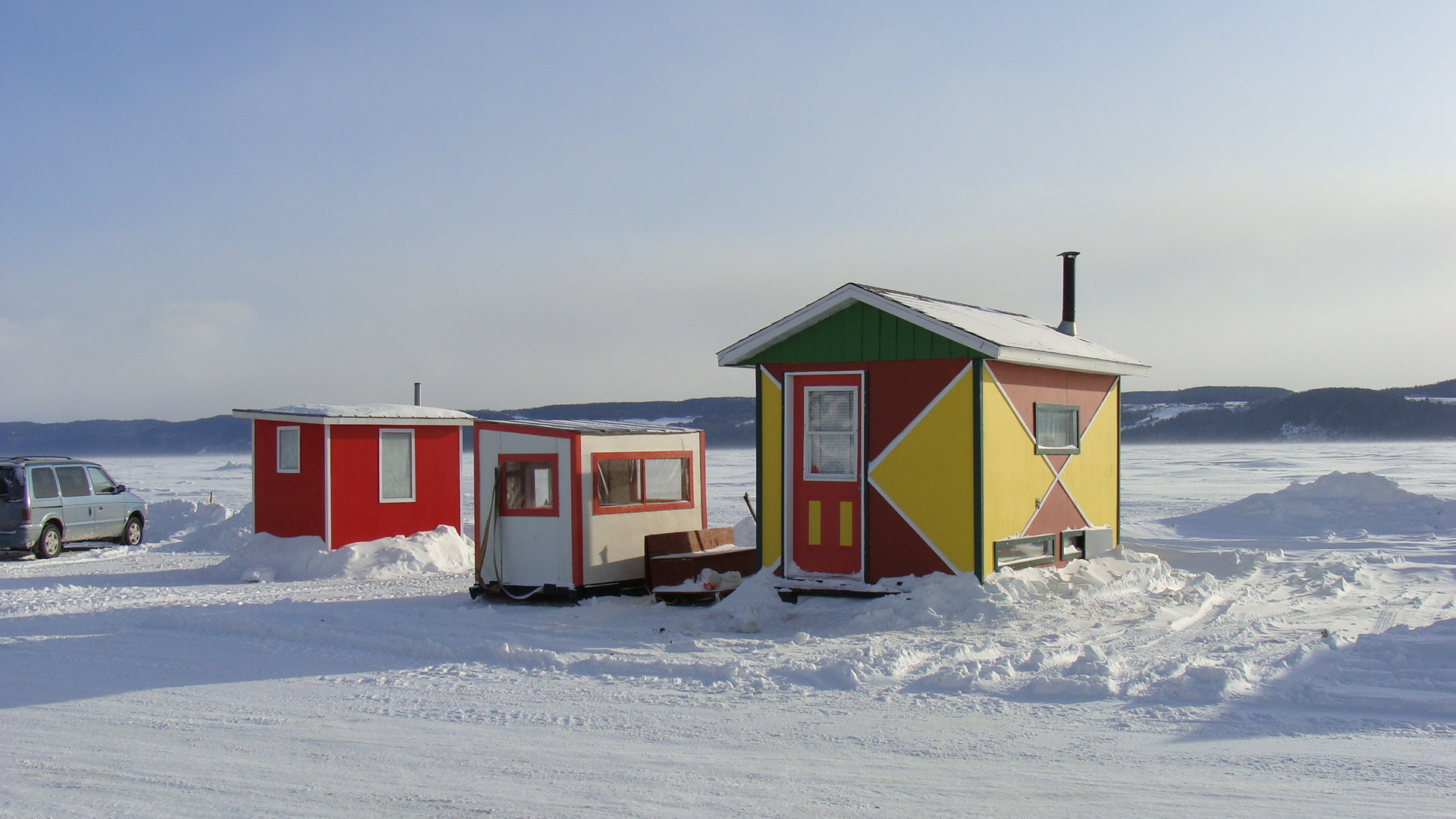
Ice shanties, Saguenay River, Saint-Fulgence, Quebec, Canada

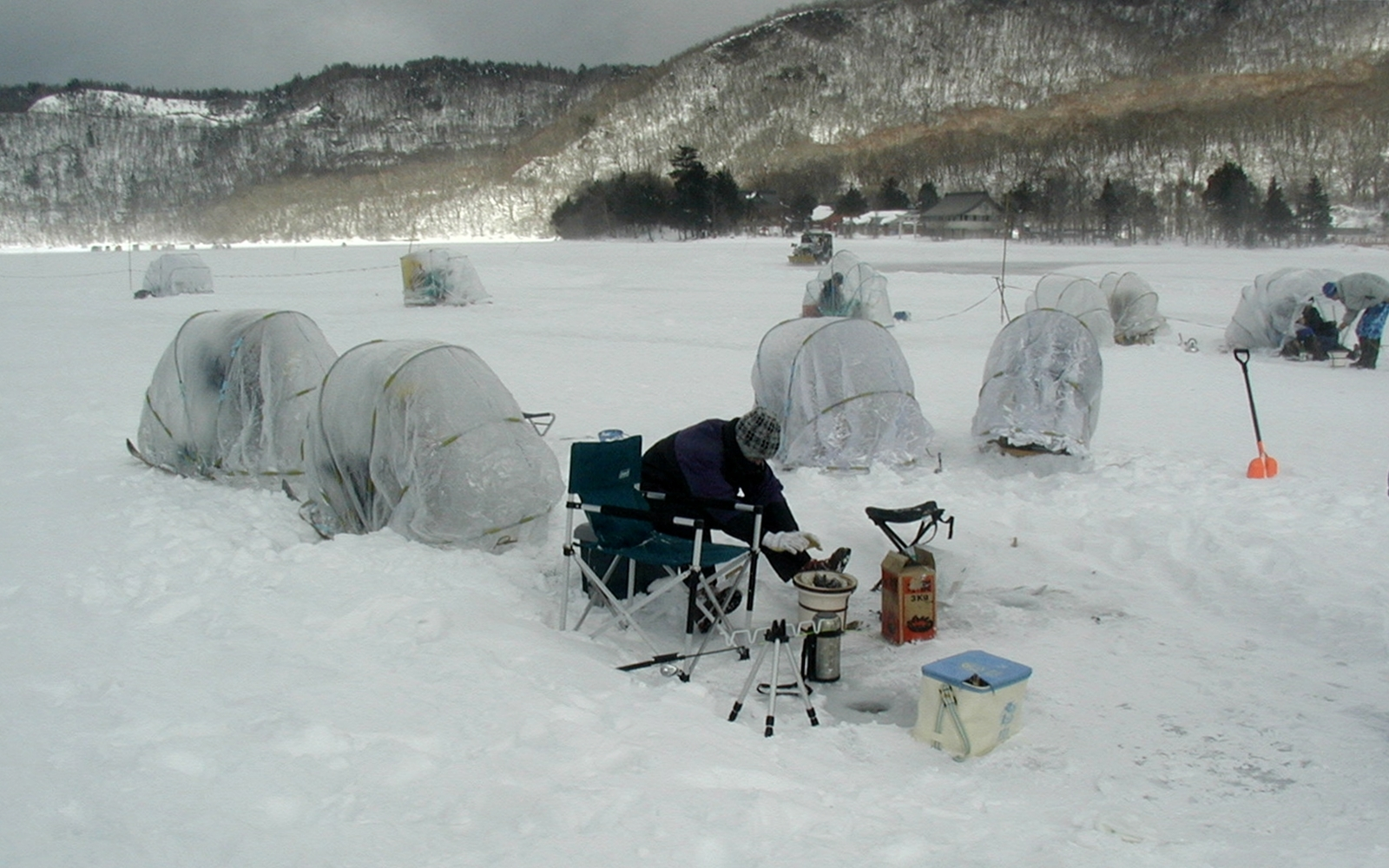
Snail-shaped shelters, Lake Ōnuma, Japan

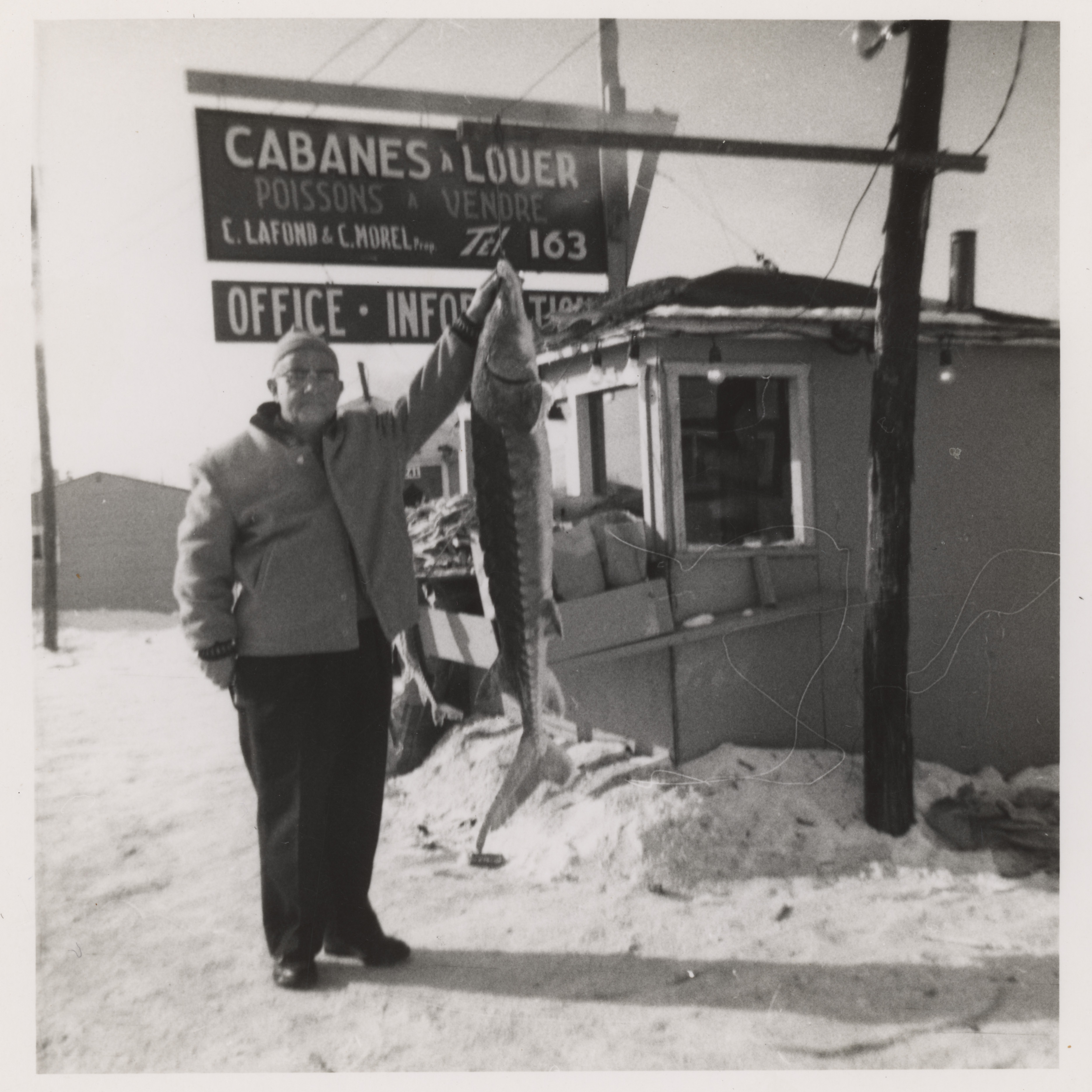
Sainte-Anne River, Quebec, Canada, 1964

Longer fishing expeditions can be mounted with simple structures. Larger, heated structures can make multiple day fishing trips possible, sometimes even overnight. A structure with various local names, but often called an ice shanty, ice shack, fish house, shack, icehouse, bobhouse, portable shelter, or ice hut, is sometimes used. These are dragged by foot or towed onto the lake using a vehicle such as a snowmobile, ATV or truck. The two most commonly used types are portable and permanent. The portable houses are often made of a heavy material that is usually watertight. The two most common types of portable houses are those with a shelter that flips behind the user when not needed, or pop up shelters with a door as the only way out. The permanent shelters are made of wood or metal and usually have wheels for easy transport. They can be as basic as a bunk heater and holes or have satellite television, bathrooms, stoves, full-size beds and may appear to be more like a mobile home than a fishing house.

In North America, ice fishing is often a social activity. Some resorts have shanties that are rented out by the day; often, shuttle service by Snow Track or other vehicles modified to drive on ice is provided. In North America, portable houses appear to create a city at locations where fishing is done.

== Fishing equipment ==
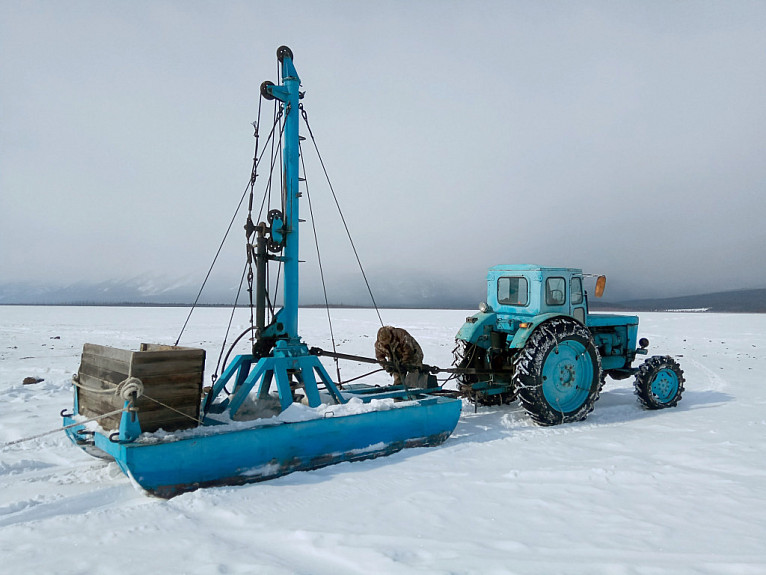
Tractor and rig for drilling holes for ice fishing

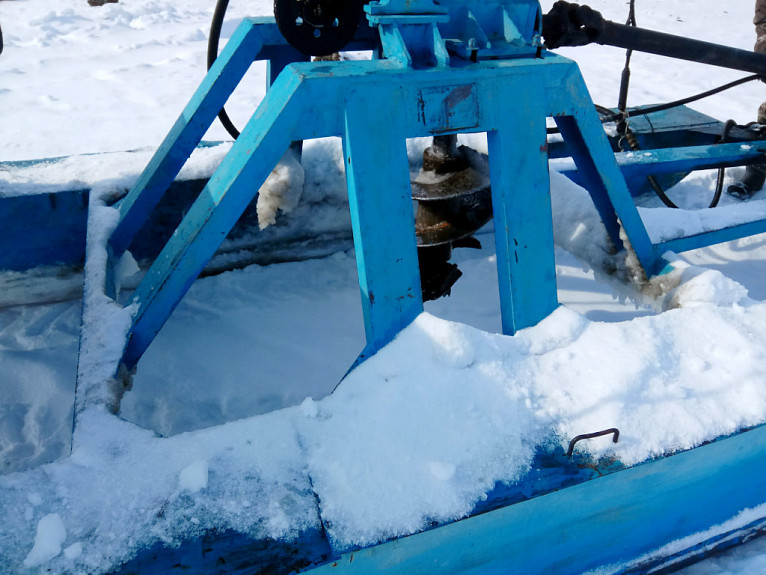
Ice ax for drilling holes

Ice fishing gear is highly specialized. An ice saw, ice auger or chisel is used to cut a circular or rectangular hole in the ice. Ice augers can be hand-held or powered. The size of the hole depends on the type of fish sought, generally suggested is 8 inches (20 cm). If these tools are not available, an axe may be used to chop the hole. A skimmer, a large metal spoon with holes in it, is used to remove new ice as it forms and to clear slush left from making the hole. During colder periods most ice anglers choose to carry a heater. The heater is not only for warmth but also for keeping an angler's fishing hole from freezing. When temperatures fall to -20 °F (-29 °C) or colder it becomes very hard to keep a fishing hole open.

Three main types of fishing occur. The first is using a small, light fishing rod with small, brightly coloured lures or jigs with bait such as wax worms, fat heads or crappie or shiner minnows. The angler sits at the hole in the ice and lifts the pole every now and then, producing the jig effect.

The second is using tip-ups, which are made of wood or plastic, and have a spool of line attached, with a thin piece of metal that goes from the spool to the flag. Black line is put on the spool and a swivel is placed at the end of the black line. Then a piece of fishing line with a hook is attached to the swivel. Worms, power bait, grub worms or small minnows are placed on the hook. The hook with bait is placed into the water under the ice. When the fish strikes the bait, the flag is lifted which notifies the angler that a fish is on the hook. The angler pulls the line in, and when the angler can get the fish's head into the hole in the ice, the fish is quickly lifted onto the ice. This allows for less-intensive fishing.

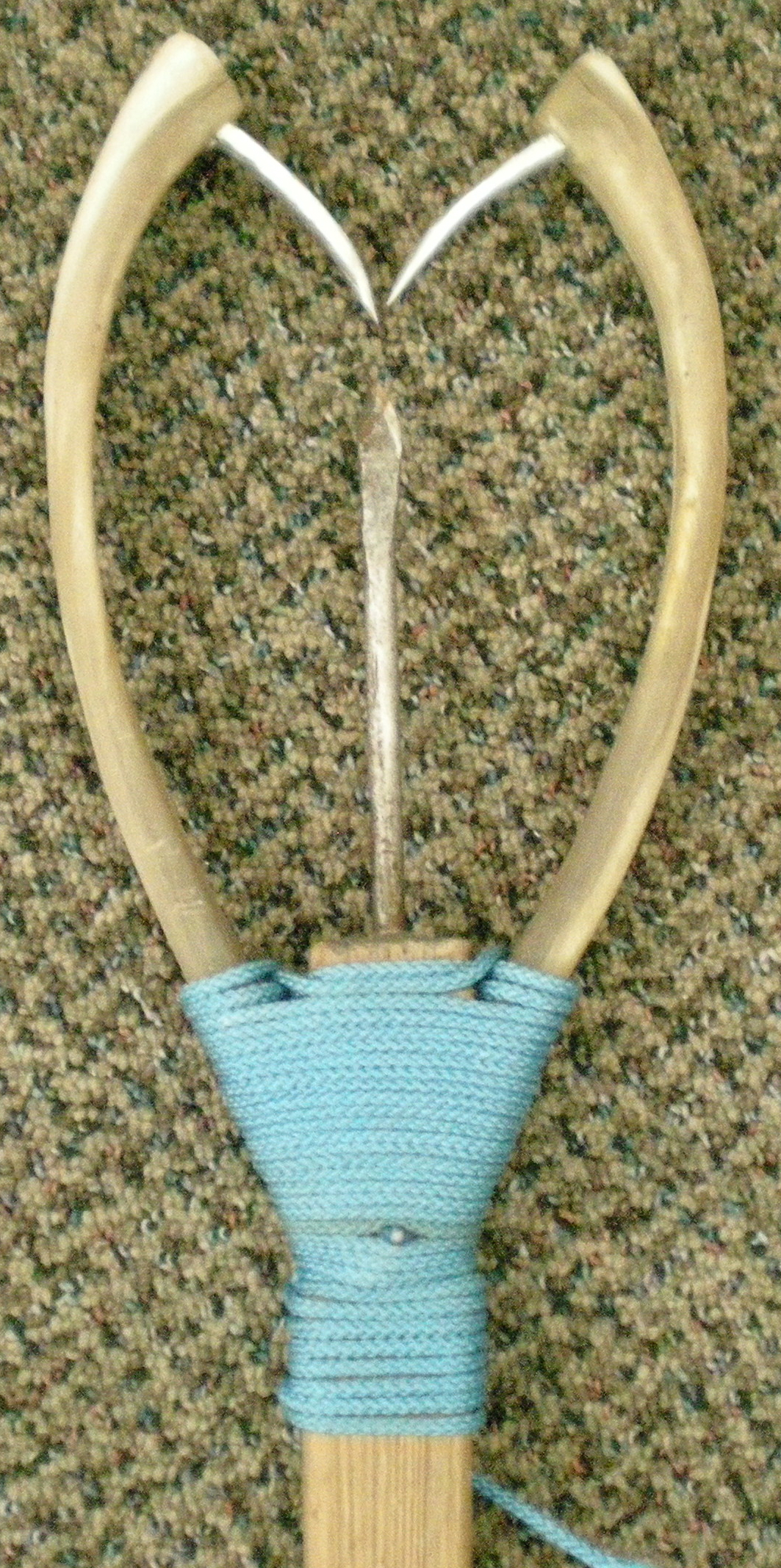
A kakivak, a fishing spear used by the Inuit

The third method is spear fishing. A large hole is cut in the ice and fish decoys may be deployed. The angler sits in a dark ice shanty called a dark house. The angler then peers into the water while holding a large spear which has four or five points. A line can be attached to the points. The fisher waits for fish to appear, then plunges the spear into the water. This method is often used for lake sturgeon fishing. In the United States many states allow only rough fish to be taken while spear fishing.

Becoming increasingly popular is the use of a flasher, similar to its summer cousin the fishfinder. This is a sonar system that provides depth information, as well as indicating the presence of fish or other objects. These flashers, unlike most typical fishfinders, display the movement of fish and other objects almost instantaneously. The bait being used can often be seen as a mark on the flasher, enabling the angler to position the bait right in front of the fish. Underwater cameras are also now available which allow the user to view the fish and observe their reaction to the lure presentation.

Older ice fishing methods include the use of a large club, where the club is slammed into the ice. When the shockwave hits the fish, it is temporary paralyzed, and gives the fisher time to cut a hole in the ice to collect the fish.

== Dangers and safety precautions ==
=== Ice thickness and type ===
There are many variables which dictate whether or not ice is safe to walk on, however there are some widely accepted parameters. For example, newly frozen ice is always safer than older ice. "Good ice" is ice which has frozen without the interruption of large temperature fluctuations, rain, or snow and is clear and free of large lumps and cracks. Additionally, the safest ice is that which sits upon a lake without moving water. Ice on the surface of rivers can be extremely unpredictable. Many anglers will go out with as little as 2.5 inches (6.4 cm) of "good ice" for walking on. The recommended thickness of ice to support an average person is 4 inches (10 cm), 5–6 inches (13–15 cm) for sleds (snow machines, snowmobiles) and most ATVs, 7–12 inches (18–30 cm) for light cars, and large ATVs and a minimum of 14 inches (36–41 cm) for full-sized trucks. Thinner ice in areas with swift surface currents are a significant hazard, as is ice that is directly over underwater spring.

=== Hazards to ice ===
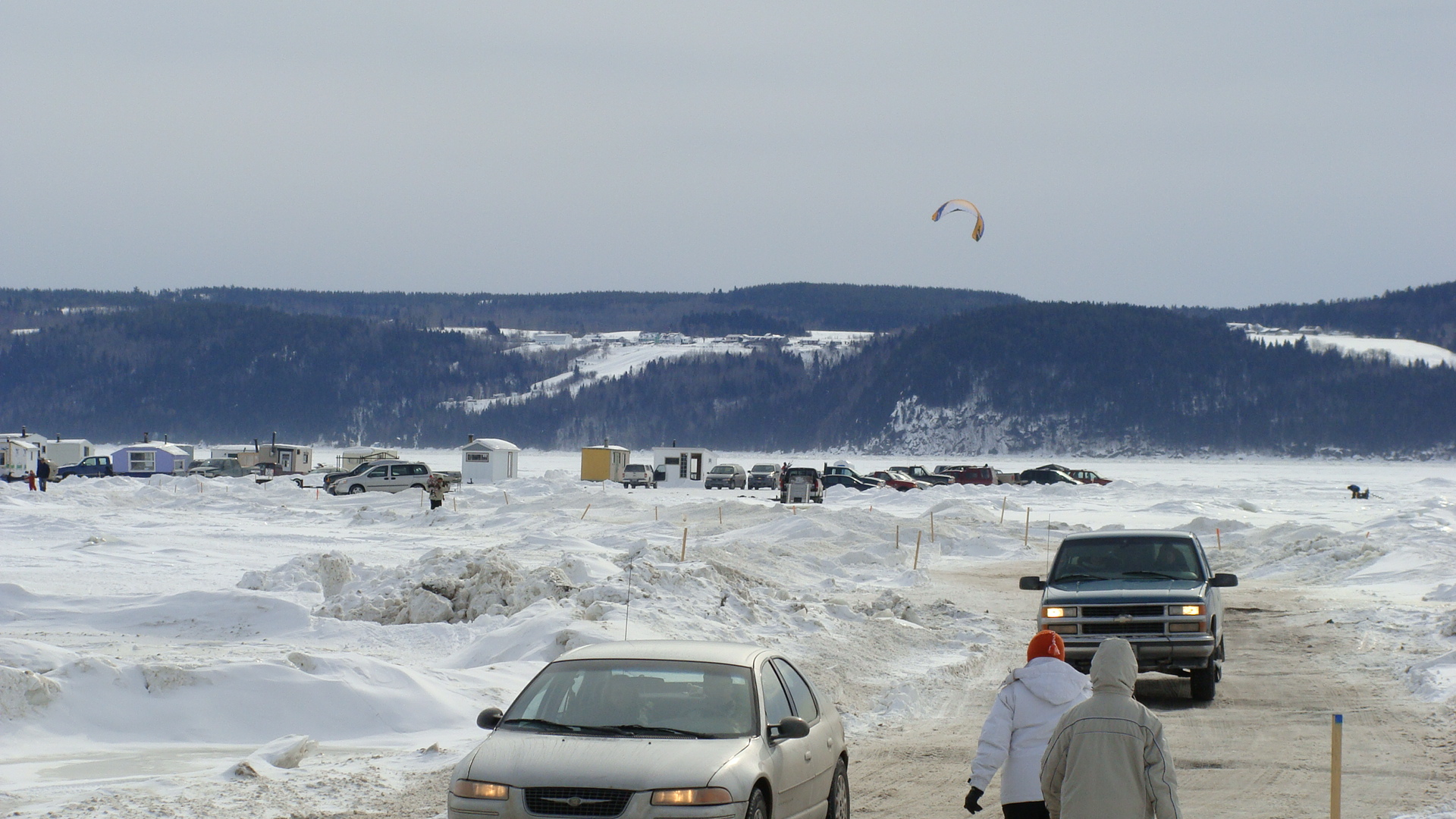
View of automobiles driving away from a "village" of ice shanties at Saint-Fulgence. Heavy automobiles risk falling into thinner levels of ice.

Offshore winds can break off pans of ice which are miles wide, stranding large numbers of fishers. Such a circumstance occurred in Lake Erie in February 2009, with 100 fishers having to be rescued by helicopters, local authorities, and the Coast Guard. One man who had fallen into the water died on the rescue flight. On March 28, 2013, as many as 220 ice anglers were trapped on break-away sea ice floes in the Gulf of Riga (Latvia), necessitating a full-scale rescue operation which employed helicopters and hovercraft. Many similar operations—although typically much smaller in scale—are required each year due to reckless and/or inexperienced anglers.

Late-winter warm spells can destroy the texture of the ice, which, while still of the required thickness, will not adequately support weight. It is called "rotten ice" or soft ice and is exceedingly dangerous. Some ice anglers will continue to fish, since even with the bad ice normally 8 inches (20 cm) is more than enough. Ice anglers may carry a self-rescue device called an "ice pick″ made of two spiked handles connected by a string to pull themselves out of the water and onto the ice.

=== Hazards to people ===
Many cars, trucks, SUVs, snowmobiles, and fish houses fall through the ice each year. Current environmental regulations require the speedy recovery of the vehicle or structure in this situation. Divers must be hired, and when the trouble occurs far from shore, helicopters may be employed for hoisting.

Other risks associated with ice fishing include carbon monoxide poisoning from fish house heaters and frostbite due to prolonged exposure to wind and low temperatures, although most new houses are fitted with air exchange systems that allow air flow, preventing poisoning.

Although fatalities are somewhat rare, in the year of 2017, 56 people died while out on the ice in USA and Canada. Fatalities almost always occur from drowning after one has fallen into the ice, although a small number of victims died from blunt-force trauma (e.g.: hitting one's head on the ice whilst falling in the water).

=== Risks to fish ===
Some practices in ice fishing involve releasing the fish once it is caught, also known as catch-and-release ice fishing. During the period, fish go through an increase in stress level that can impact their metabolism. Hook damage, temperature shock, air damage and exhaustion are all part of what can affect the fish. Limiting air exposure time and handling fish with bare hands can help reduce the impact on the fish.

== Ice fishing rules and regulations ==
=== Wisconsin ===
Fishing regulations control angler impacts on fish populations, maintain numbers and sizes of fish in water bodies, provide different types of fishing experiences such as fishing for dinner or a trophy fish, and make access to fishing as fair as possible. There are limited open seasons for certain species and water bodies in Wisconsin.

=== New Jersey ===
In New Jersey anglers may use no more than five devices, i.e. a combination of tip-ups and/or jigging rods. All devices not hand-held must bear the name and address of the user and must not be left unattended.

=== Massachusetts ===
Ice fishing requires a freshwater fishing license for those aged 15 and older. Anglers are allowed up to five hooks through the ice at one time. A hook is defined as an angling device attached to the line of a tip-up or jig stick that is designed to take one fish at a time. This includes plain hooks, treble hooks, spinners, spoons, bait harnesses, jigs, or plugs. This device is not restricted to a single hook, and lures with multiple treble hooks count as one hook. Hooks can be on any combination of tip-ups or jig sticks, but no more than five hooks in total. All anglers must be able to tend their own hooks. Adults may assist minors with cutting holes or removing hooks, but minors must be capable of tending their own tip-ups or jig sticks.

== Contests ==
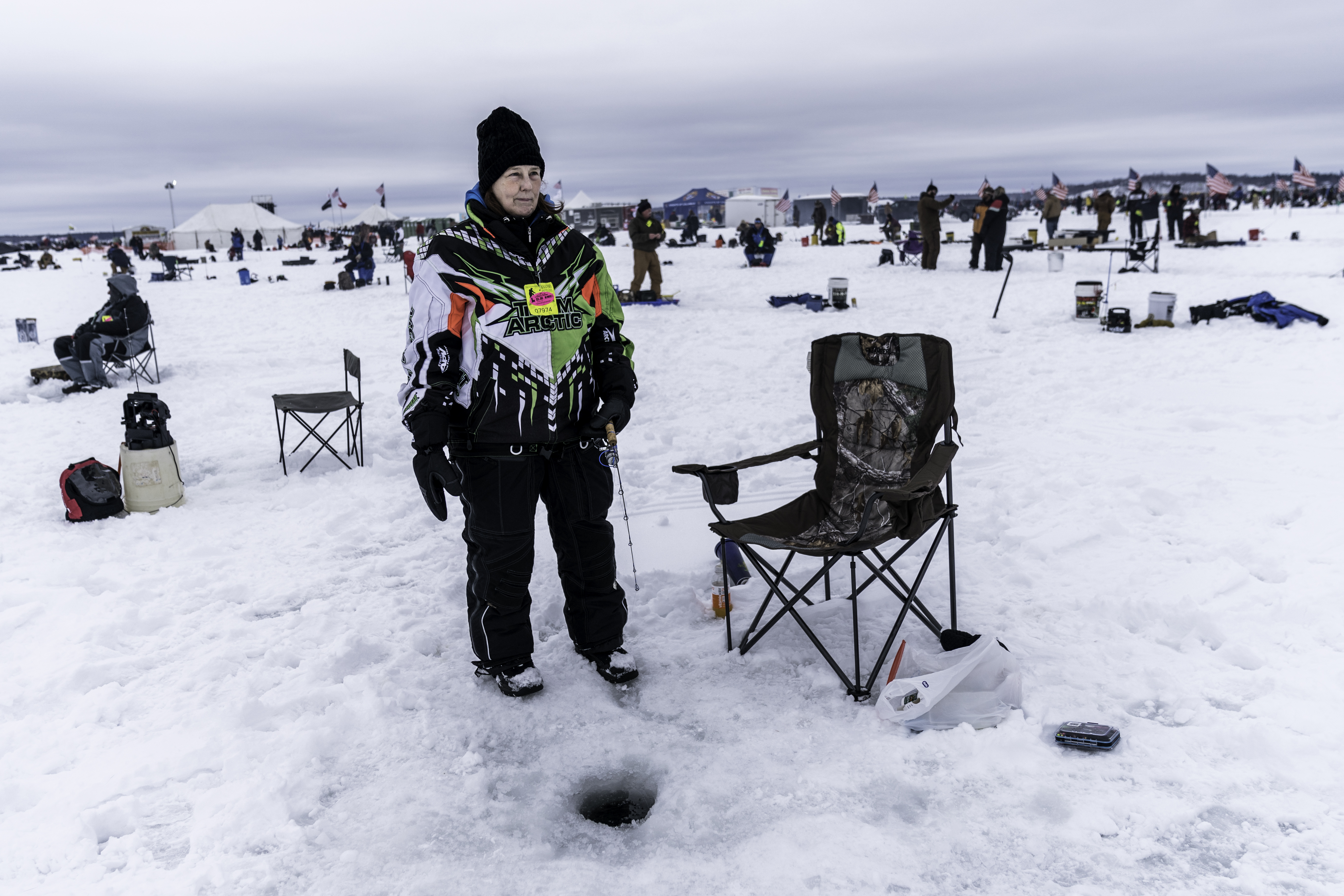
A participant at The Brainerd Jaycees Ice Fishing Extravaganza at Gull Lake in Minnesota, USA

Ice fishing contests generally offer prizes for the largest number of fish caught within a limited time period. There are many ice fishing contests consisting of friends and neighbors with a modest number of contestants and small prizes. Conversely, throughout North America—especially in the northern parts of the Midwest and throughout Canada—many large and well-organized contests take place yearly. Most of these larger contests offer big prizes for contestants who catch the biggest fish.

Currently, the world's largest contest, the Brainerd Jaycees Ice Fishing Extravaganza, is held on Gull Lake, north of Brainerd, Minnesota, in January of each year. The contest has over 15,000 anglers and drills over 20,000 holes for the contest. $152,232 in charity was raised in the 2016 contest, and donated to 41 local charities.

Lake Simcoe in Canada has abundant cold water fish such as lake trout, herring and whitefish. Known as Canada's ice fishing capital, every year it is host to this contest.

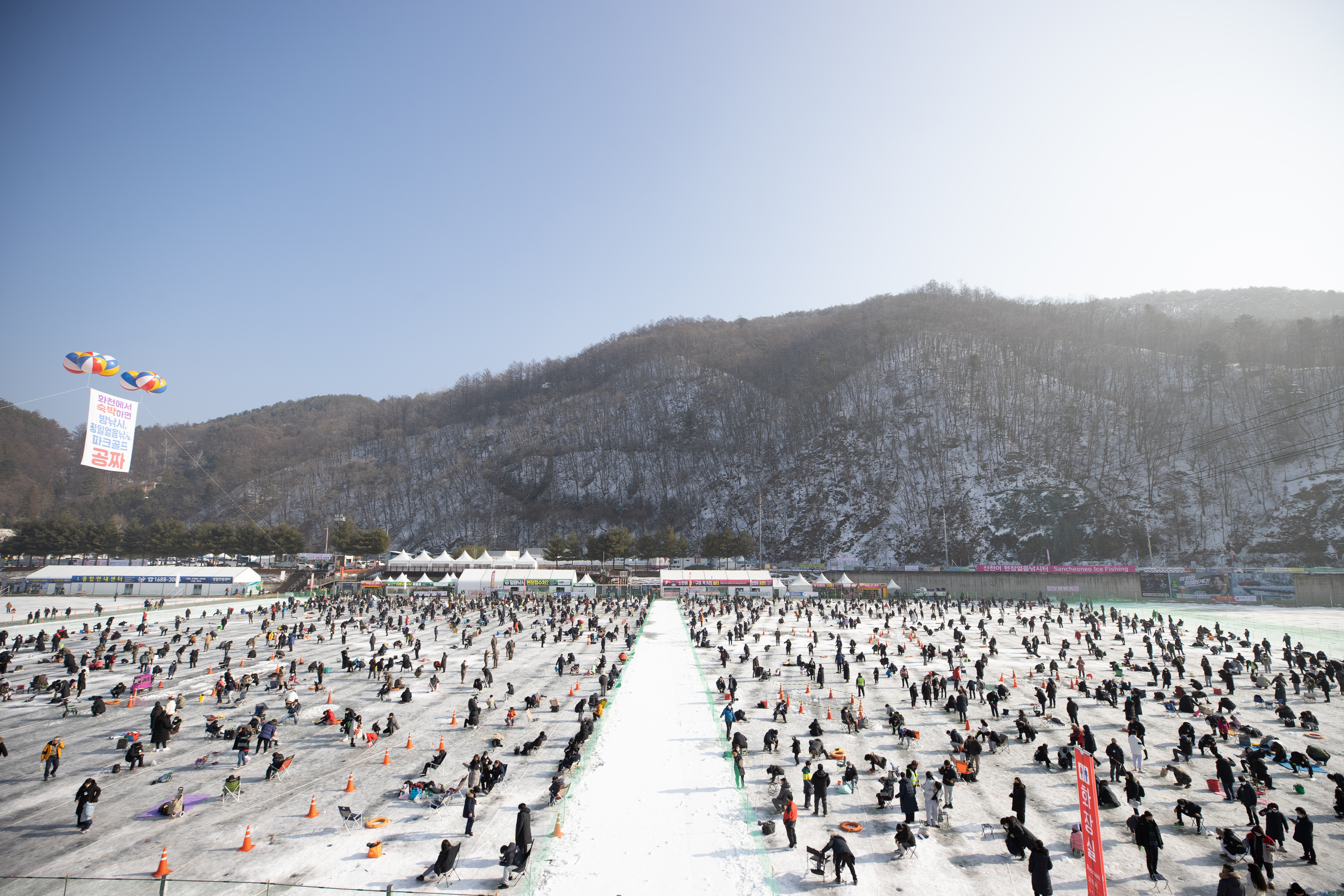
2023 Hwacheon Sancheoneo Ice Festival

In Hwacheon, South Korea, a large ice fishing festival is held every January. The Ice Festival draws nearly a million visitors every year, and thousands of people have taken part in a contest to catch fish in a frozen Hwacheon (a tributary of the Han River).

== Bycatch ==
=== Non-fish ===
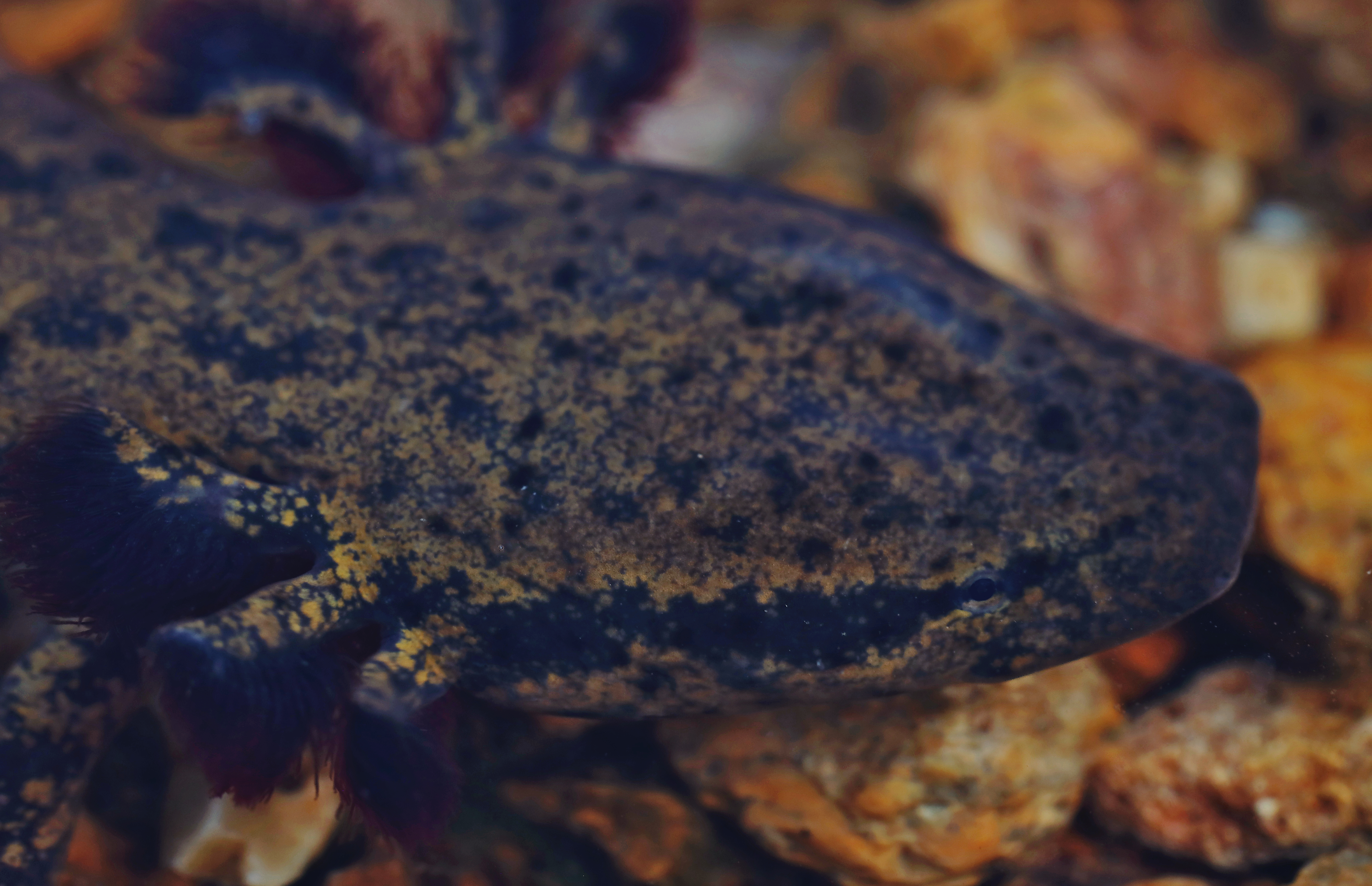
Common Mudpuppy - see the feathery external gills

In North America, common mudpuppies (Necturus maculosus) are frequently caught accidentally while ice fishing. Mudpuppies are large (10–17 in) fully aquatic salamanders that are active during the winter. They breathe using feathery gills that they retain from their larval stage. They forage for aquatic invertebrates and small fish. There is a myth that mudpuppies left out on the ice will survive the winter and return to the water when it thaws. However, as mudpuppies cannot survive freezing and require water to breathe, it is likely that this practice has led to the death of many mudpuppies.

== Representations of ice fishing in media ==
Ice fishing has been depicted in film, including in the 1922 documentary Nanook of the North and the 1993 film Grumpy Old Men. It has also been depicted in plays, such as the 2016 production of Nice Fish, starring Mark Rylance. Ice fishing is referenced in the song "Introduction to Ice Fishing" in the mixtape Gone Fishing by American rap group The Cool Kids. The 2013 David O. Russell film American Hustle features a scene in which a Stoddard Thorsen (Louis C.K.) tells a story about ice fishing.

== Impacts of climate change ==
Climate change can impact the future of ice fishing by delaying the beginning of the ice fishing season. It adds a layer of risk for anglers, with more unpredictable conditions early in the season and more precautions required to ensure the ice is thick enough. Winter ice loss can lead to social consequences for communities relying on ice fishing as a food income, and on the economy of ice fishing. In Minnesota, warmer winters have resulted in the cancellation of fishing tournaments and reduction in ice fishing, influencing the social network, food security, and overall well-being of communities. Changing ice conditions have contributed to increasing subsistence costs and fresh food prices being higher in northern Canada than in southern Canada.

== Photo gallery ==
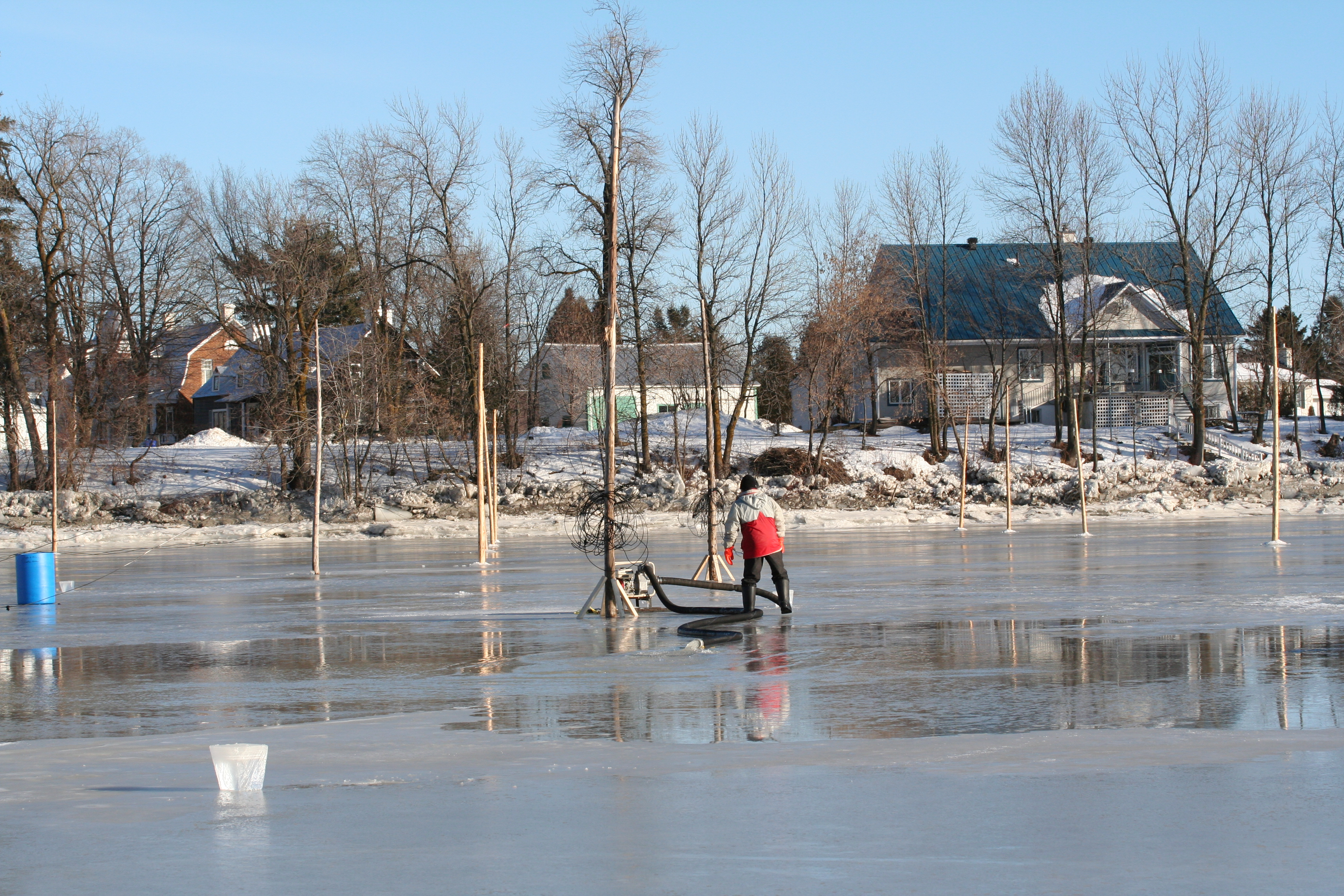
Strengthening ice by watering

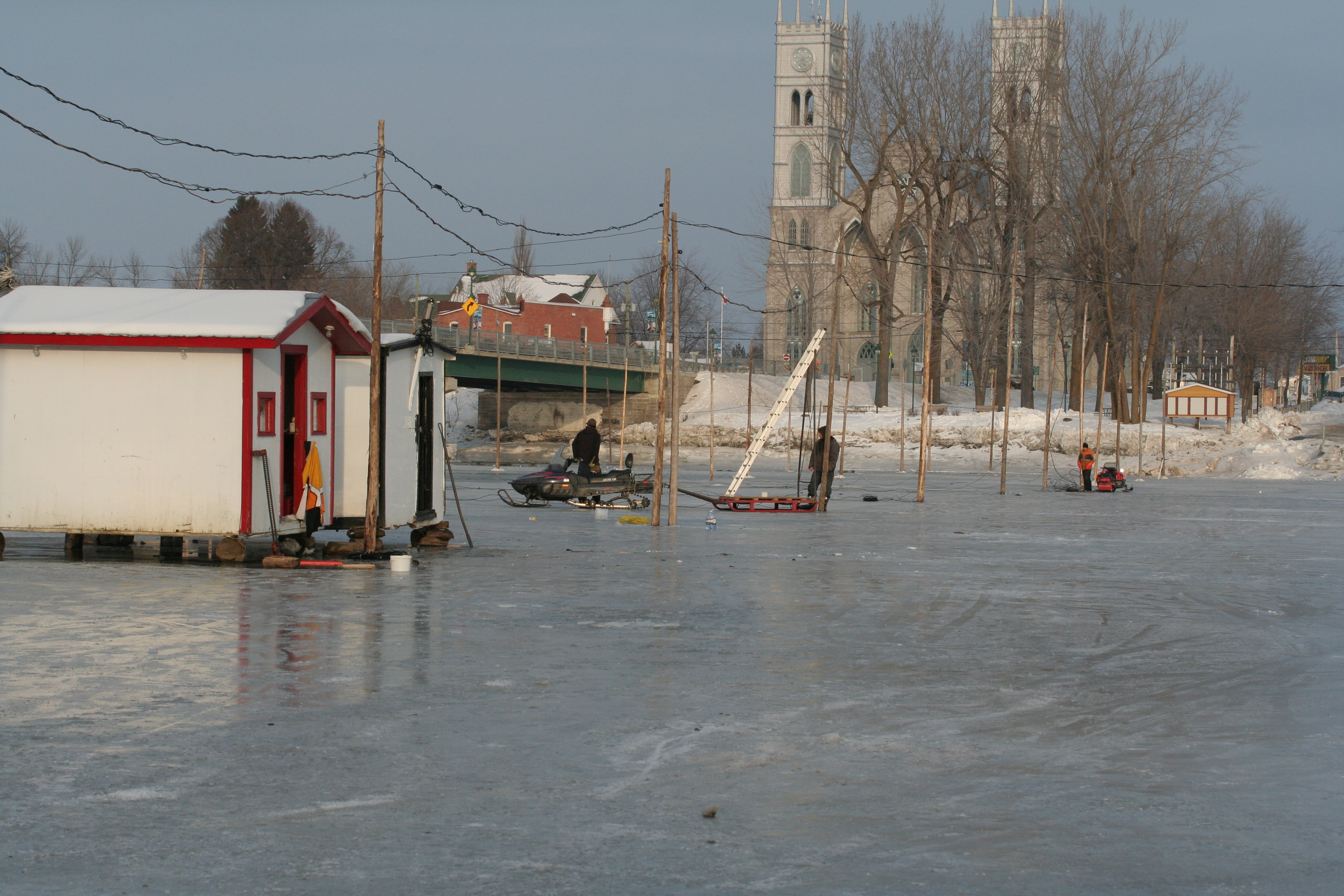
Installation of the electrical network

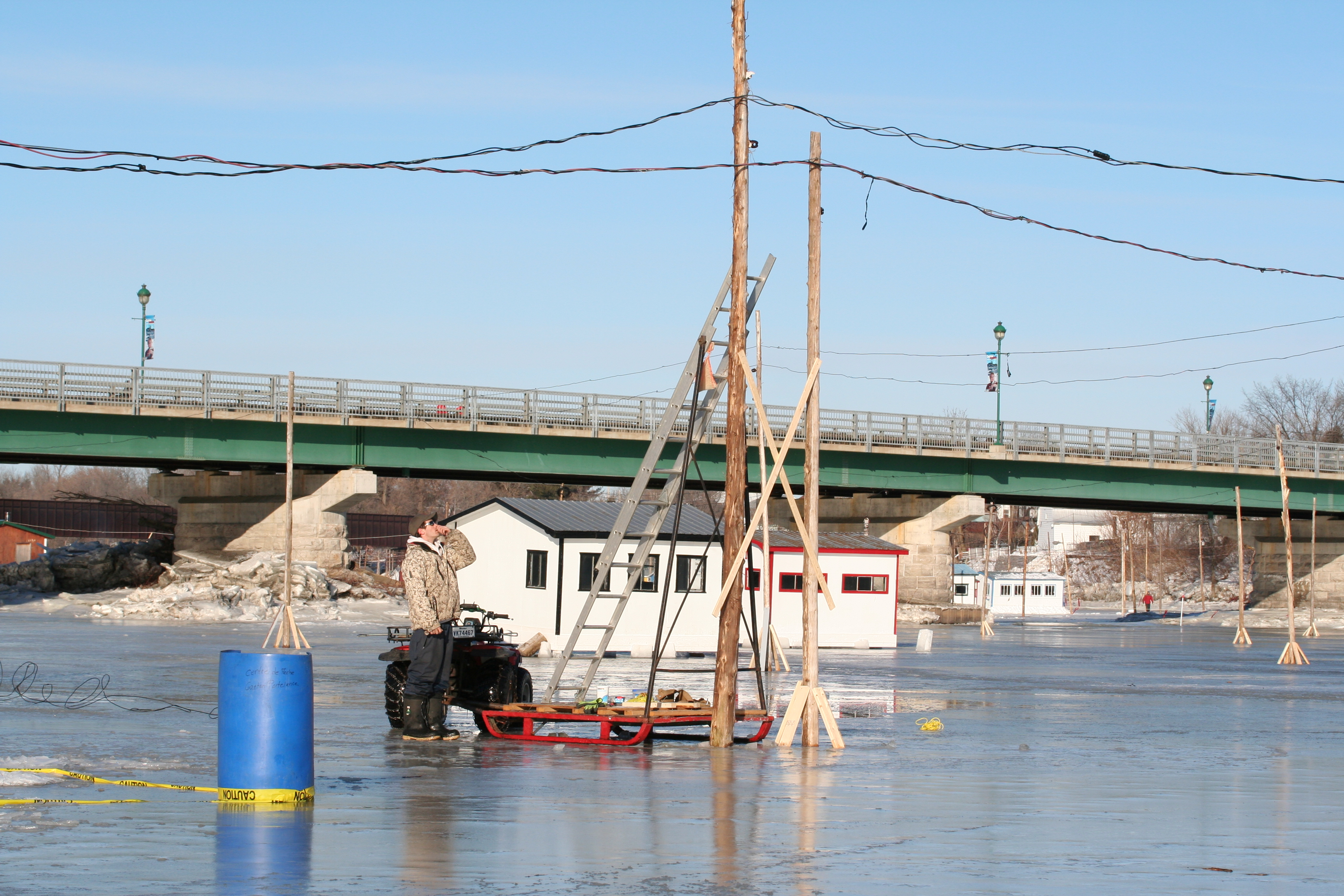
Electrical poles and wires

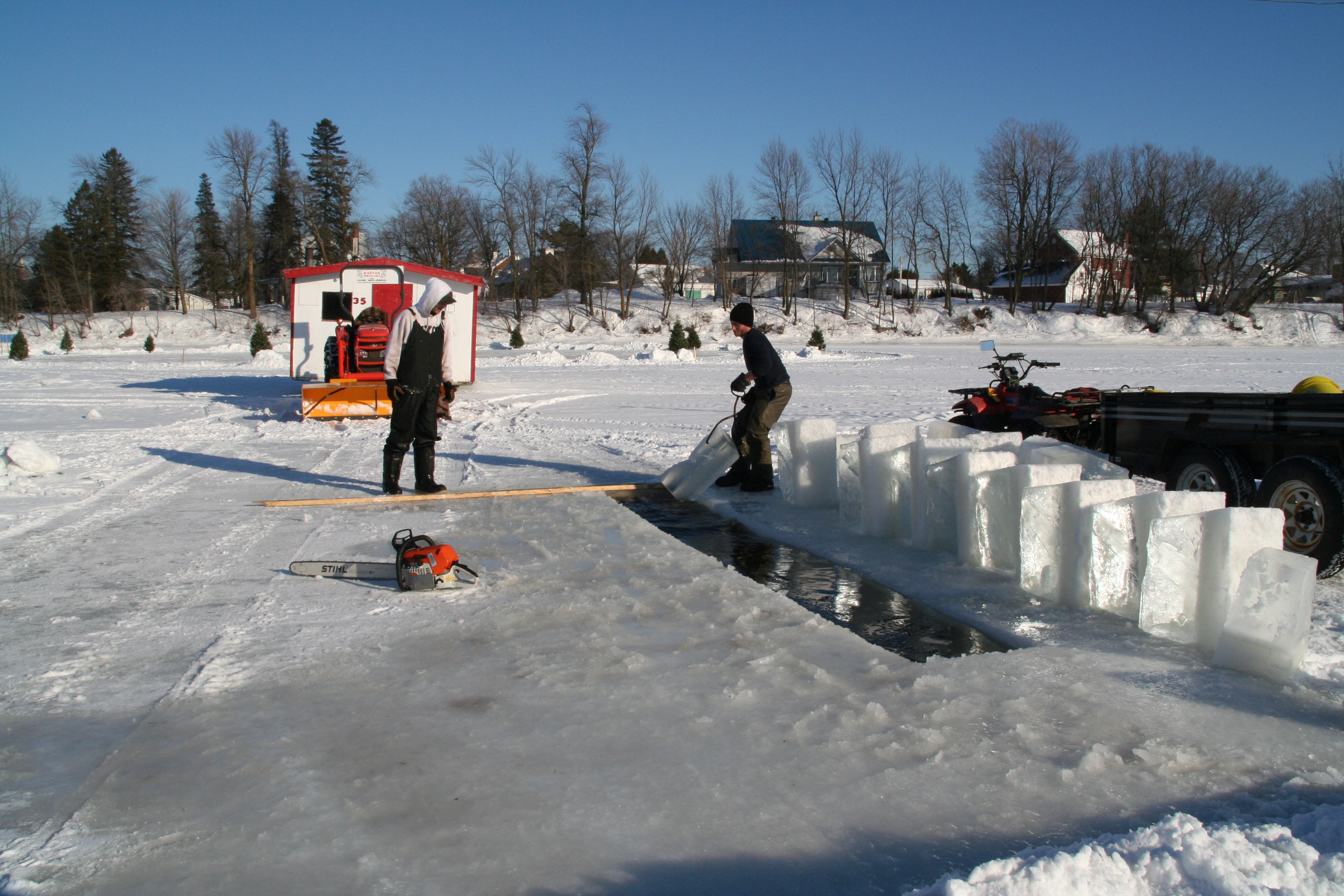
Hole and ice blocks

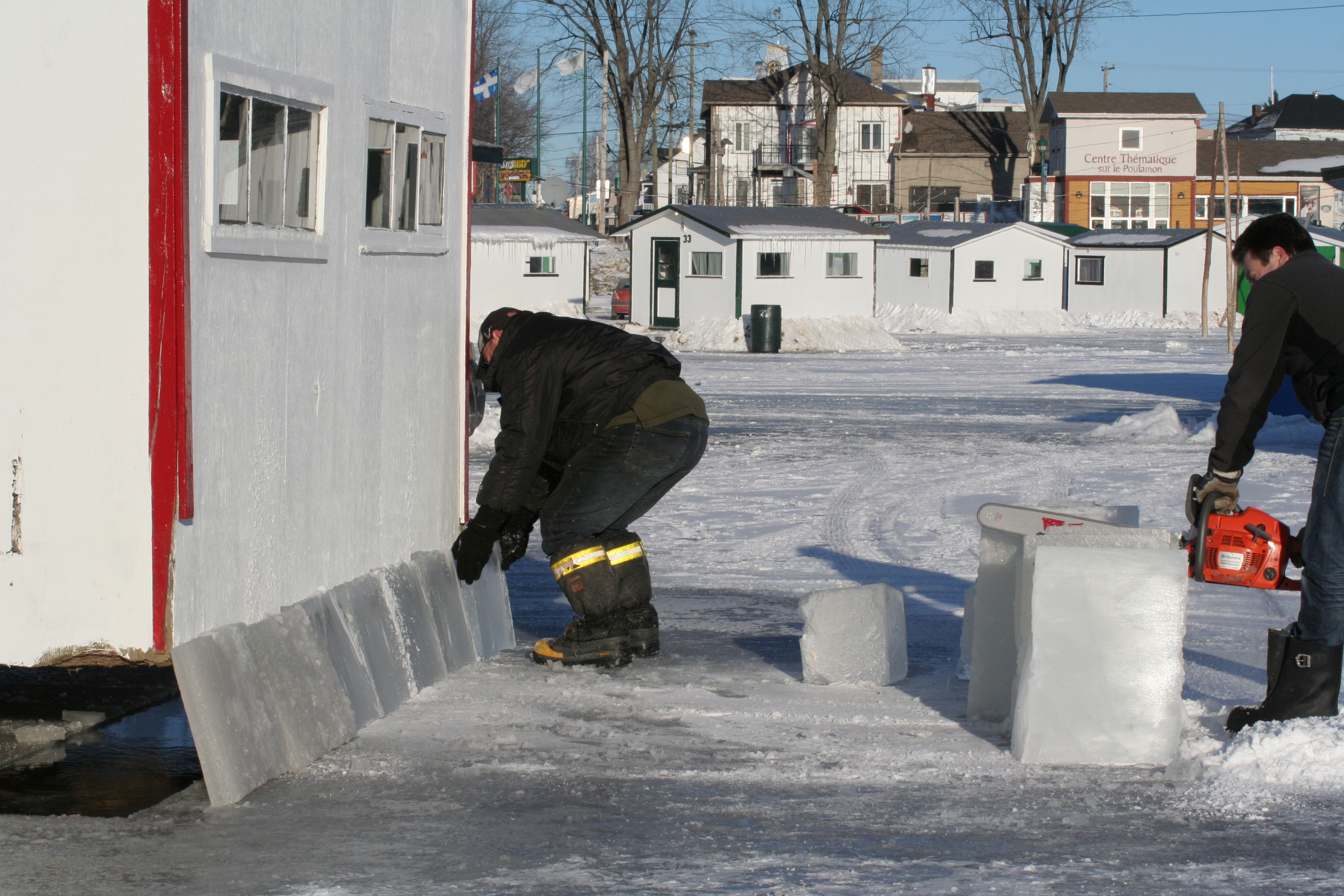
Resurfacing a cabin with ice, which will be covered with snow

== See also ==
- Ice road over frozen water
- Fly fishing
- Ice jigger
- Kayak fishing
- Surf fishing
