= Jiggers =

Jiggers may refer to:

- Jiggers, an Iggy Arbuckle character
- Jiggers, alleyways in Liverpool, like chares in North-east England
- Tunga penetrans, an aquatic-related parasite
- Jiggers, devices used by trainers in Thoroughbred racing in Australia to deliver electric shocks to horses

== See also ==
- Jigger (disambiguation)
