= Ice Shack =

Ice Shack or Ice shack may refer to:

- An episode of the TV show That '70s Show
- Ice shanty, a shelter for ice fishing also known as an Ice shack
