= Tip-up (ice fishing) =

A tip-up is a device used while ice fishing to suspend live or frozen bait at a set depth through a hole drilled in the ice with an auger, and detect when a fish strikes, without having to be in contact with this piece of gear. When a fish does take the bait, a flag "tips up" or the flag can "tip down" to signal the angler that a fish has taken the bait. Anglers can see the flag from a distance and can thus manage multiple holes at once, covering a larger area than with just an ice fishing rod.

== Types of tip-ups ==
There are four distinct categories of commonly used types of tip-ups:

1. Cross-stick design: As the name says, two sticks cross to make an "X", while another stick holds the line spool submerged in the water. A long narrow piece of spring metal is attached to the opposite end of this third stick and a piece of bright fabric (flag) is attached to the free end of the spring metal. The flag is set by inserting the free end of the spring metal in to a curved metal wire which makes contact with the spool. When a fish takes the bait and pulls out line, the spool rotates, and tabs on the spool rotate the wire, releasing the flag and alerting the angler that a fish has taken the bait.
2. Flat-board design: In this design, a flat board rests on the ice. A shaft runs perpendicular to the board with a spool of line on one end and a trip bar on the other. A spring is mounted to one end of the board, and a metal "flag pole" is attached to the spring. The flag is set by placing the flag pole under the trip bar. When a fish bites, pulling the line spins the spool, therefore the shaft, and therefore the trip bar. With nothing to hold the flag down, it springs up and alerts the angler to a strike.
3. Thermal tip-ups: The setting and trip mechanism is the same as a flat-board design, but the base covers the entire hole. This slows how quickly the hole will re-freeze and prevent spooking especially wary fish by blocking the path for sunlight which is created by clearing snow and cutting the hole.
4. Wind tip-ups: The setting and trip mechanism on these can be the same as any of the other tip-ups listed, but they are unique in that the spool is ABOVE water and a small sail uses the wind to gently jig the bait up and down.
