= Jigger (nickname) =

As a nickname, Jigger may refer to:

- Edwin Harlan (1886–1939), American football and baseball player, coach and attorney
- Albert Jigger Johnson (1871–1935), American logging foreman
- John Johnson, the second two-time Indianapolis 500-winning riding mechanic (1931 and 1937)
- Darach O'Connor (born 1995), Irish Gaelic footballer
- Gerard Phalen (1934–2021), former Canadian senator, educator and union leader
- Jacob Siegel (fl. 1900–1910), American gunman turned professional gambler
- Leon Sirois (born 1935), American former race car driver
- Jigger Statz (1897–1988), American Major League Baseball player
- Giannis Vardinogiannis (born 1962), Greek billionaire shipping magnate

== See also ==
- Jigger (disambiguation)
