= Jigger =

Jigger may refer to:

== Tools and machines ==
- Jigger (bartending), used to measure out a jigger (1.5 US fluid ounces) of liquor
- Pallet jack, used to lift and move pallets
- Hydraulic jigger, a hydraulically powered mechanical winch
- Ice jigger, used for setting fish nets under ice between two distant holes
- Jigger, a machine for the shaping of clay body into flatware; see Glossary of pottery terms § J
- Total station, a surveying instrument also known as a "jigger"

== Transportation ==
- Handcar (hand-operated) or railroad speeder (motorized), a railway car mostly used for maintenance
- Jiggermast, the aftmost mast of a four-masted sailing ship

== Arts and entertainment ==
- "Jigger", a work by Li Cheng (painter) (919–967)
- Jigger, a large statue in Brownhills, West Midlands, England
- Jigger Craigin, a character in the musical Carousel

== Places ==
- Jigger, Louisiana, United States, an unincorporated community
- Jigger, a local name for the settlement of South Tunbridge in Tunbridge, Vermont, United States
- Jigger Inn, St Andrews, Scotland, a historic pub

== People ==
- Jigger (nickname), a list of people
- Jigger, a person who engages in jigging, i.e. fishing with a jig lure

== Other uses ==
- Tunga penetrans or chigoe flea, a tropical parasitic arthropod
- Jigger, the inner button of a double-breasted coat or jacket
- Jigger, an obsolete golf club that was a very low lofted iron with a shortened shaft

== See also ==
- "The Jiggler", an episode of the TV series Adventure Time
- Jiggerpole, a very long fishing pole used with a very short and very heavy line
- Jigga, nickname of American rapper Jay-Z
