= Ice shanty =

Portable shed placed on a frozen lake to provide shelter during ice fishing

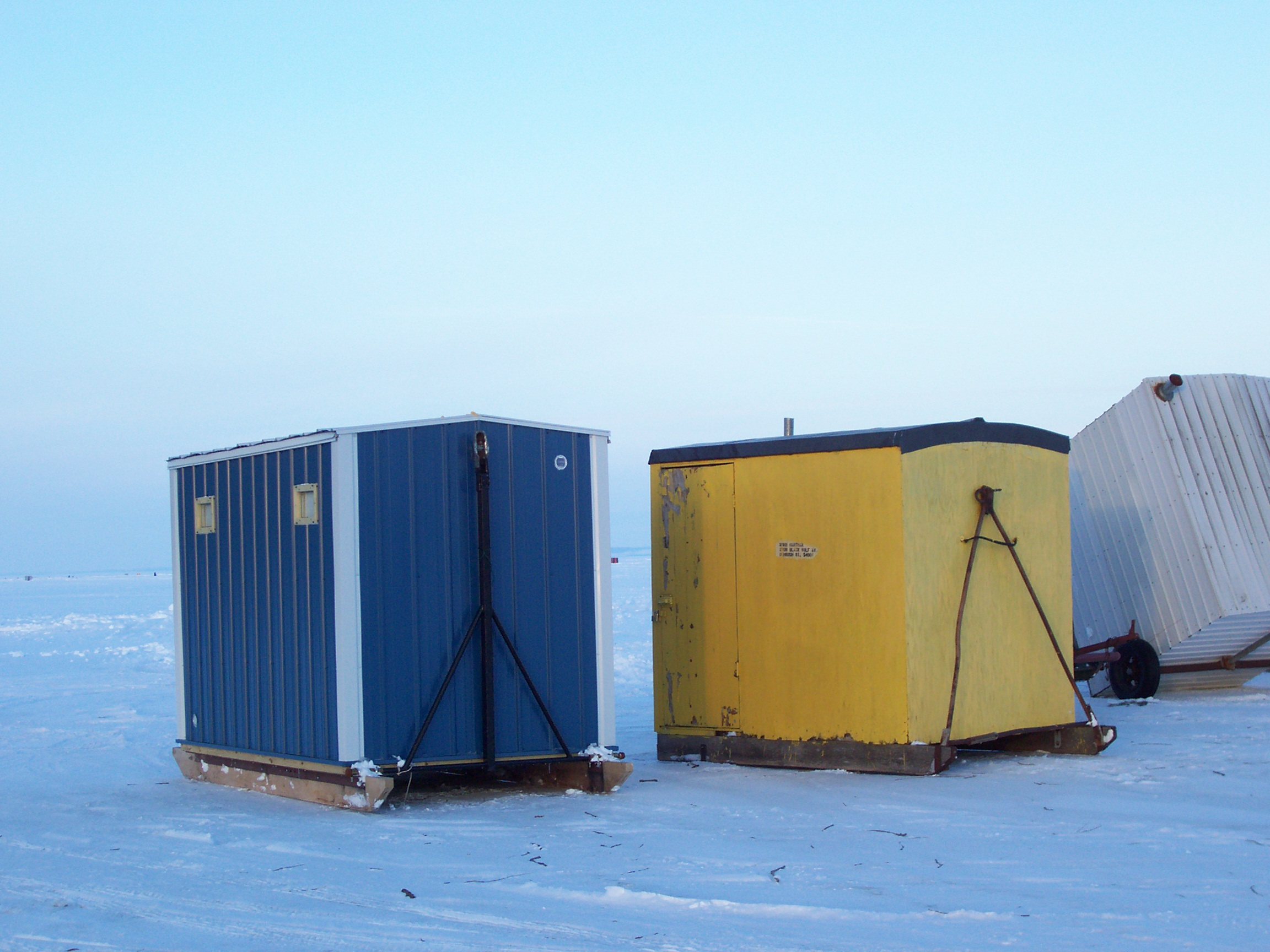
Ice shanties, Lake Winnebago, Wisconsin, US

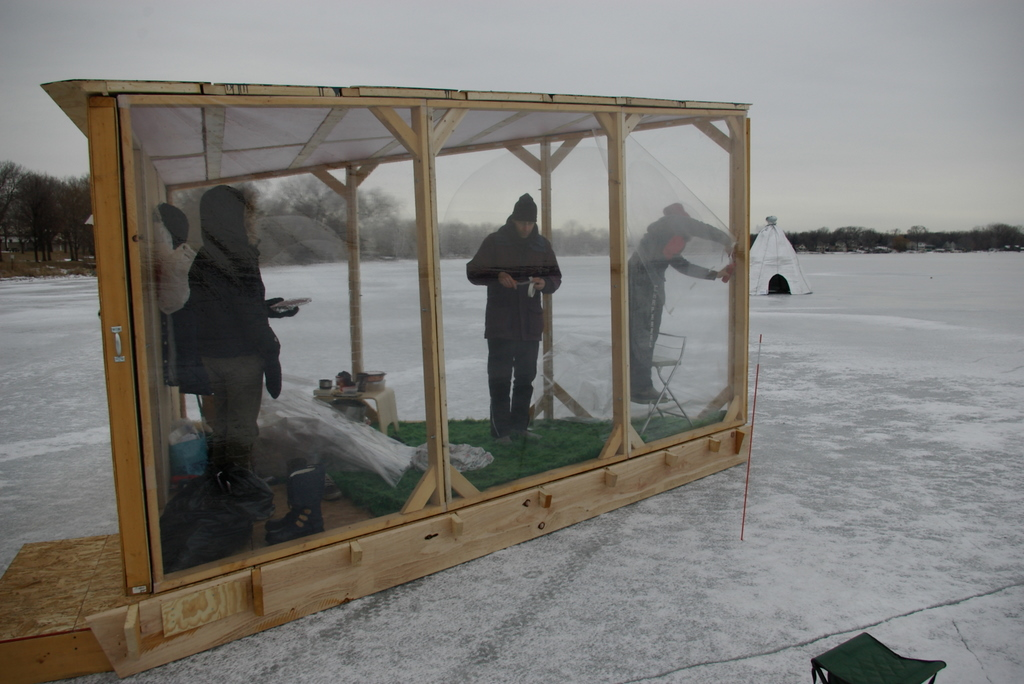
The Vista, an unusual shanty with a view

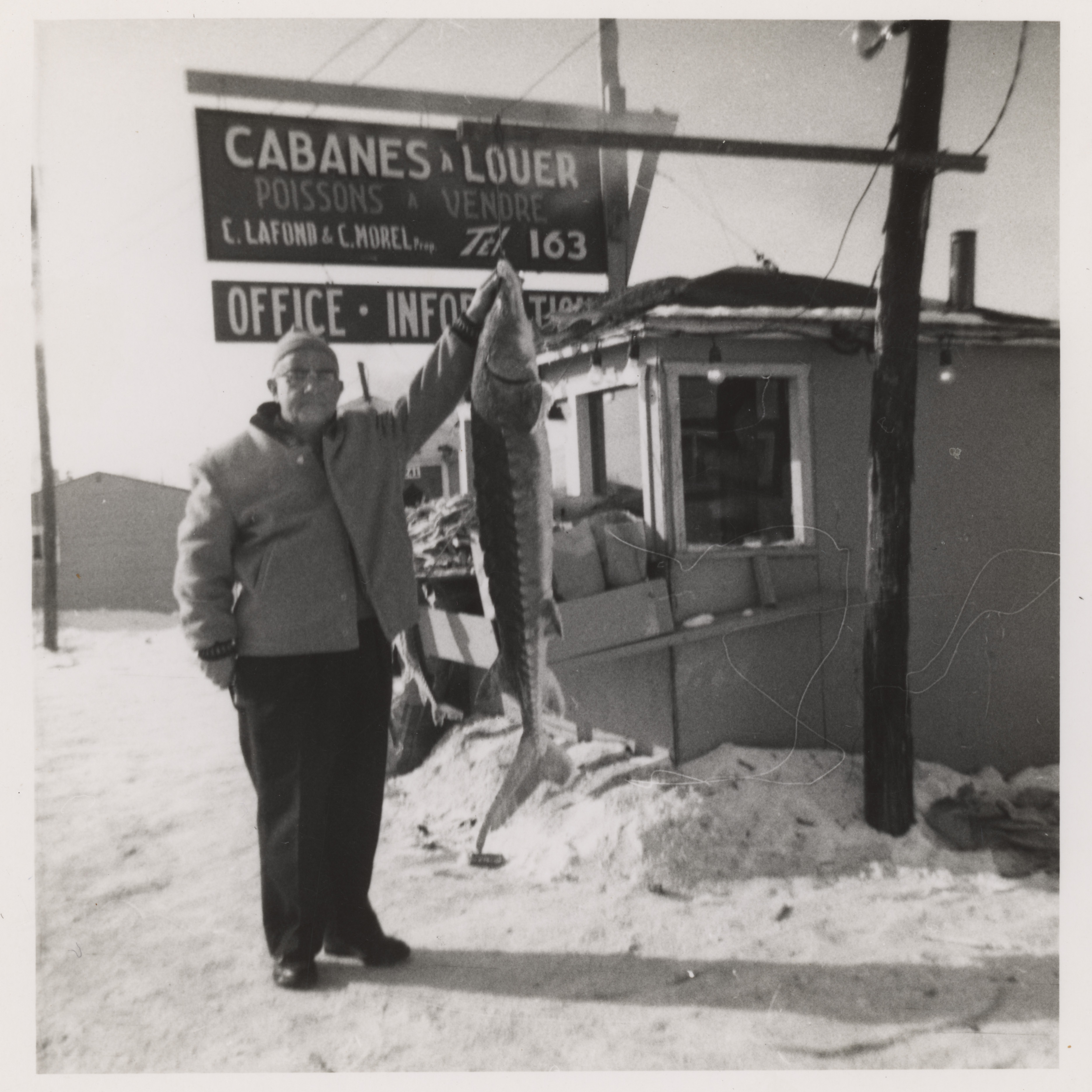
Sainte-Anne-River, Quebec, Canada 1964

An ice shanty (also called an ice shack, ice house, fishing shanty, fish house, fish coop, bobhouse, ice hut, or darkhouse; French: cabane à pêche) is a portable or permanent structure on a sled placed on a frozen lake to provide shelter during ice fishing. They can be as small and cheap as a plastic tarpaulin draped over a simple wooden frame, or as expensive as a small cabin with heating, bunks, electricity, running water, and cooking facilities.

More durable ice houses are generally left on a lake for the duration of the ice fishing season, although this can cause problems, such as thaws and re-freezing causing houses to be immoveably frozen onto the lake. Lighter, cheaper versions can collapse into a package to be moved from lake to lake during the season. These can be easily dragged by anglers across the ice to move locations or to pack up for the day.

Many northern communities have developed bodies of laws about the operation of ice shanties - frequently including dates by which they must be removed, even if the ice can still hold them.

== Culture ==
In northern climates, ice shanties are the center of ice fishing culture, customs and traditions. Fishermen often decorate their ice shanties in humorous ways (toilets are a popular joke addition), while others studiously work on ways to make their ice shanties more comfortable and efficient. Much of the culture reflects on the inherent danger of erecting a structure atop a frozen pond. The mayor of Hudson, Ohio claimed ice shanties could lead to increases in prostitution, although WJW (TV) could find no evidence of this.

== Construction ==
Setting up ice shanties in Sainte-Anne-de-la-Pérade

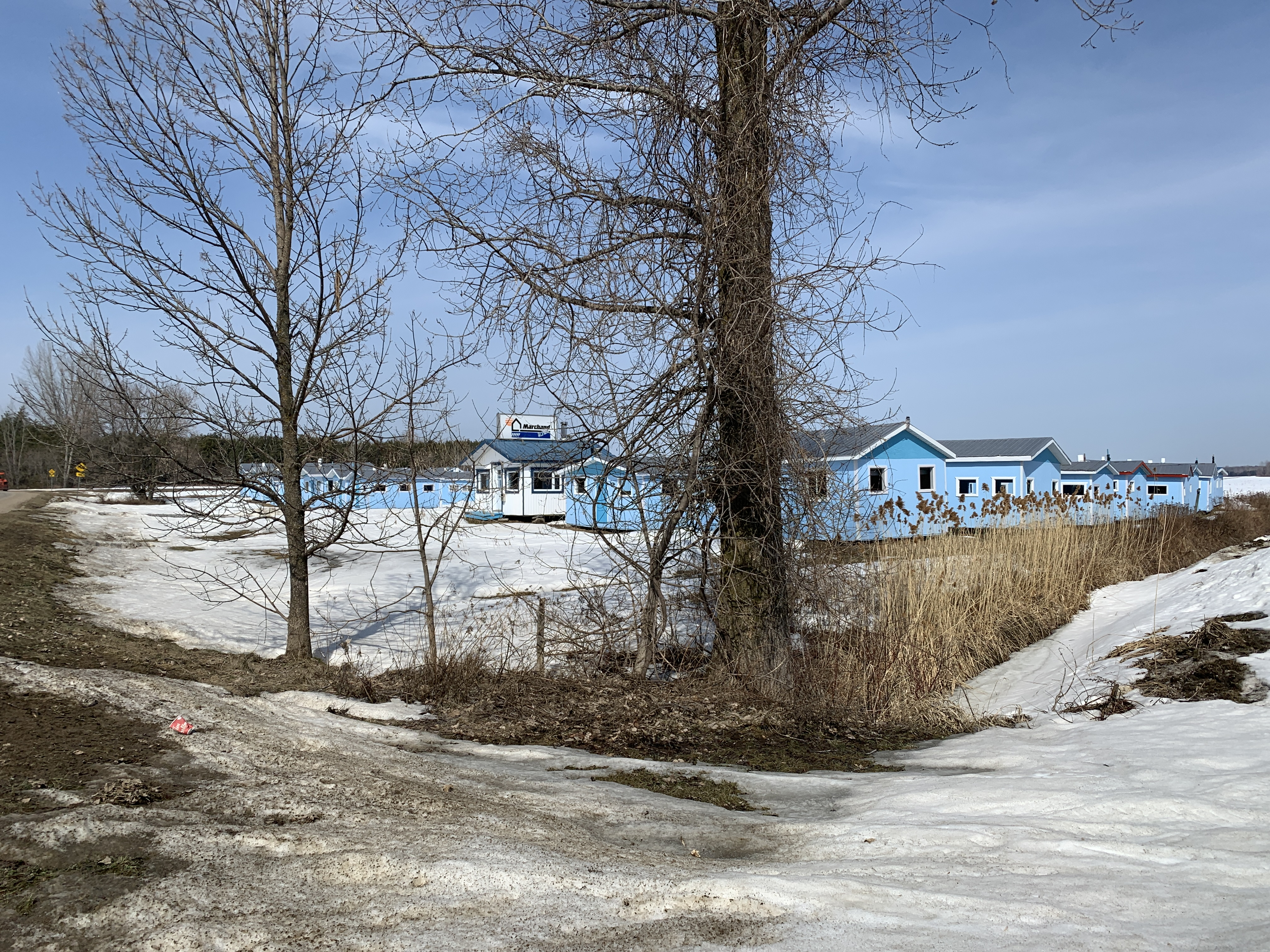
Off-season storage

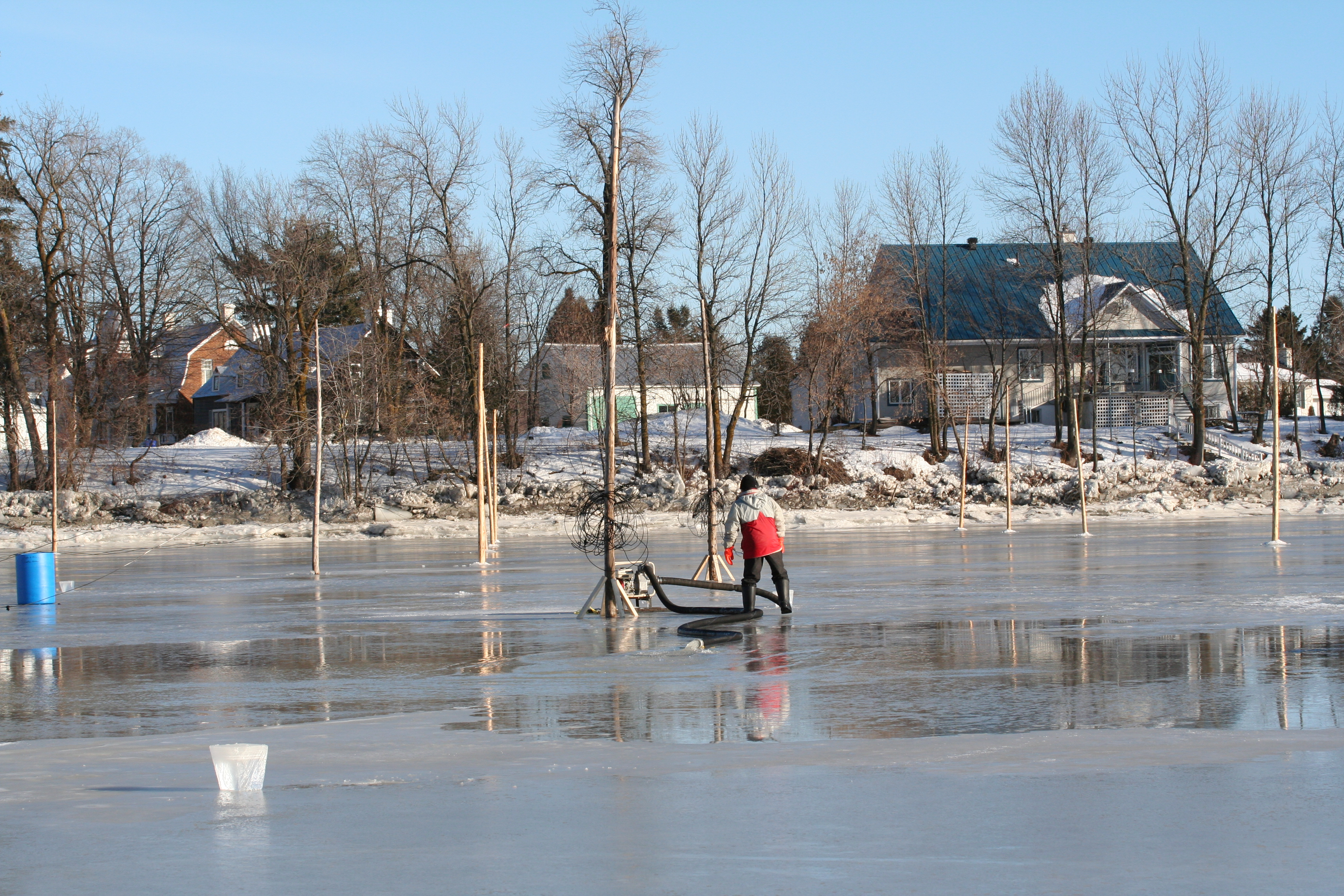
Strengthening ice with soon-frozen water

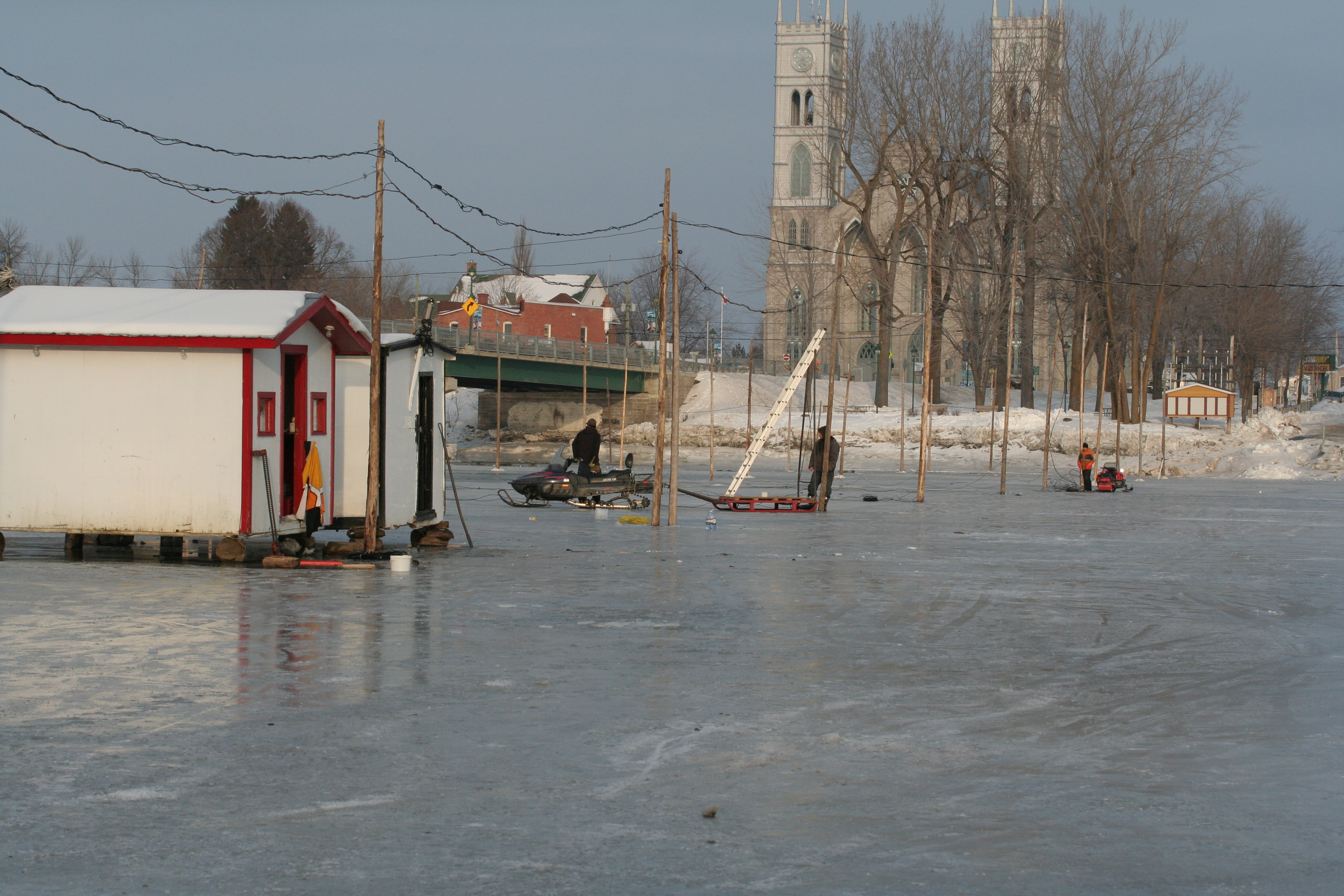
Installation of the electrical network

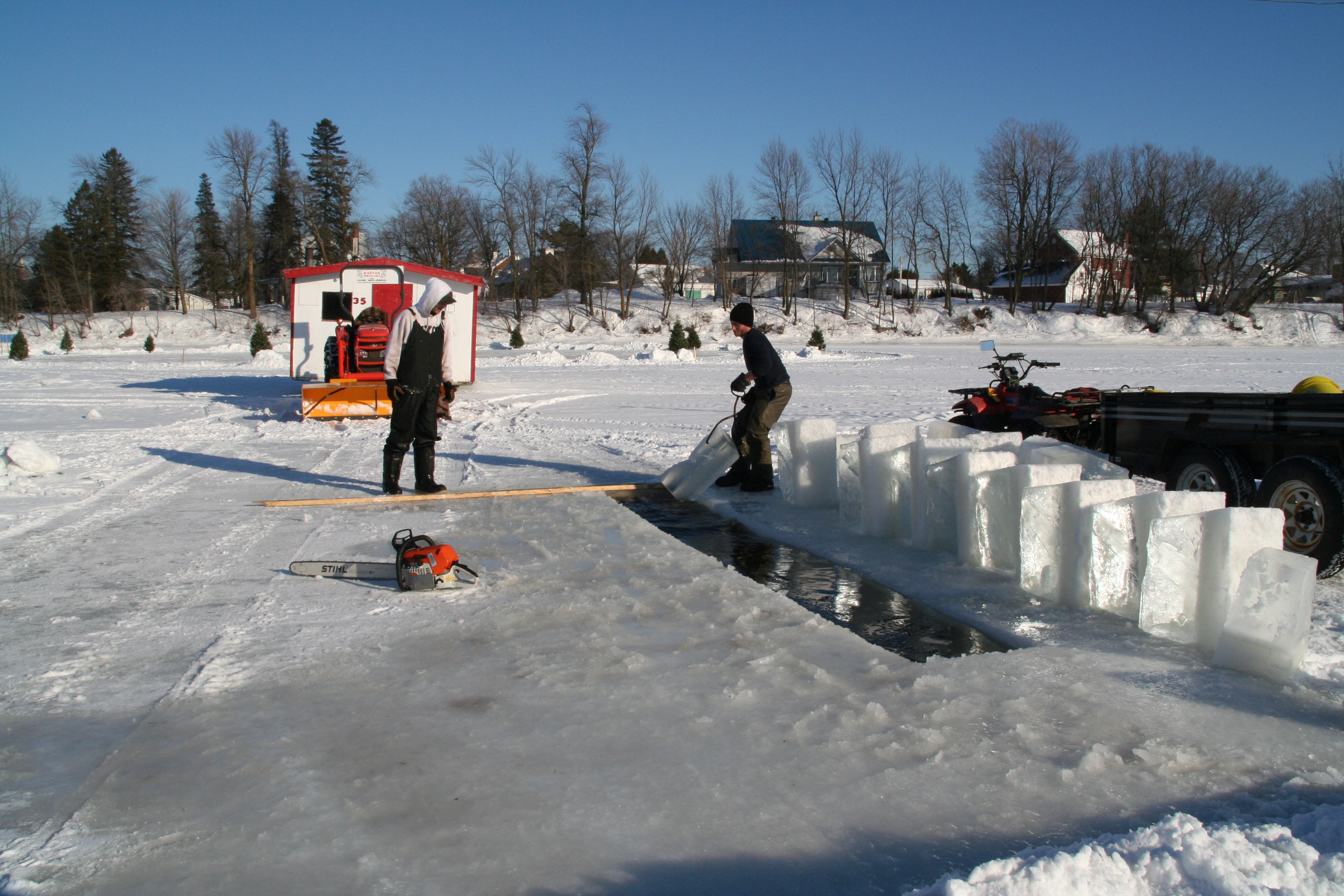
Fishing hole and cut ice blocks

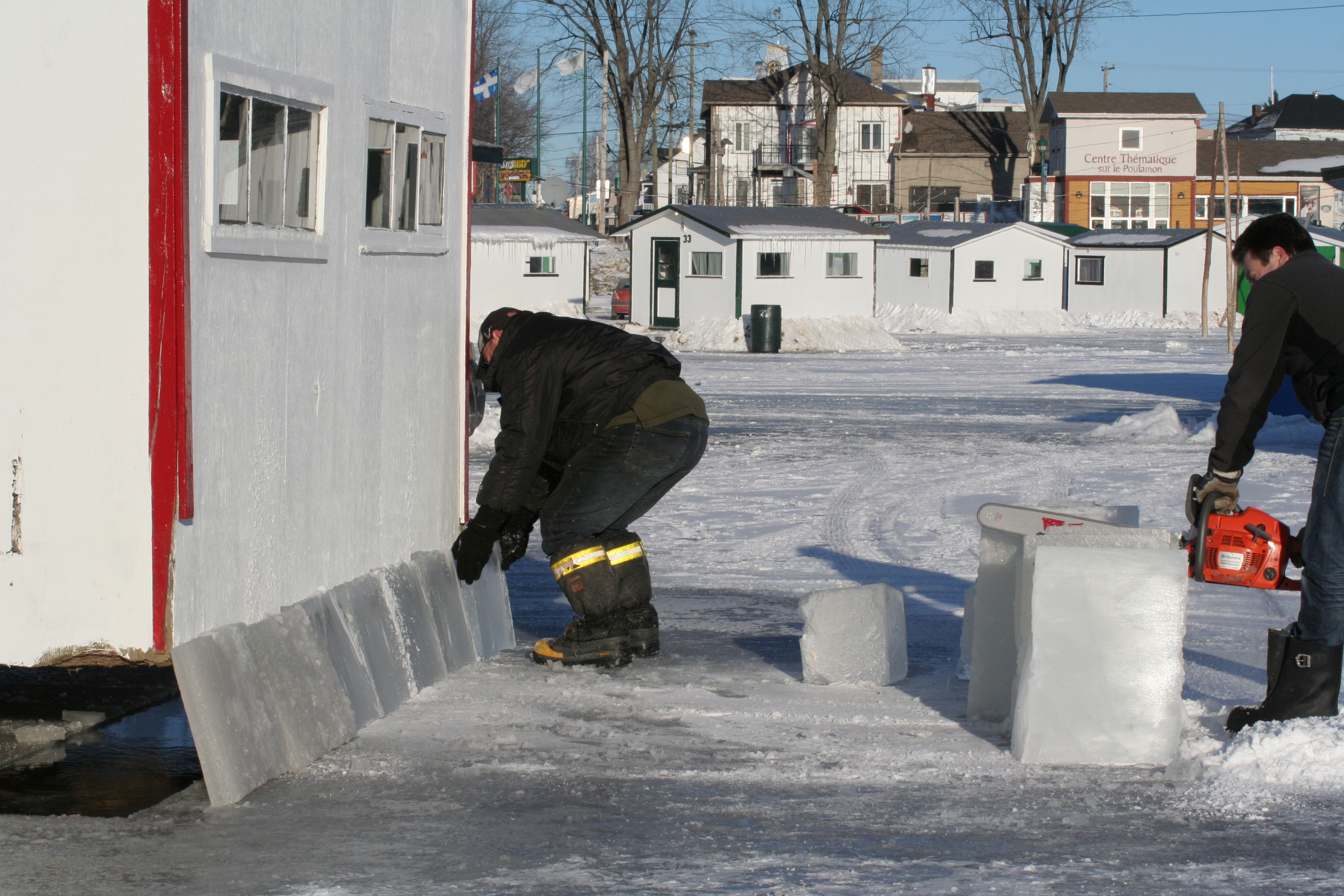
Insulation with ice, which will be covered with snow

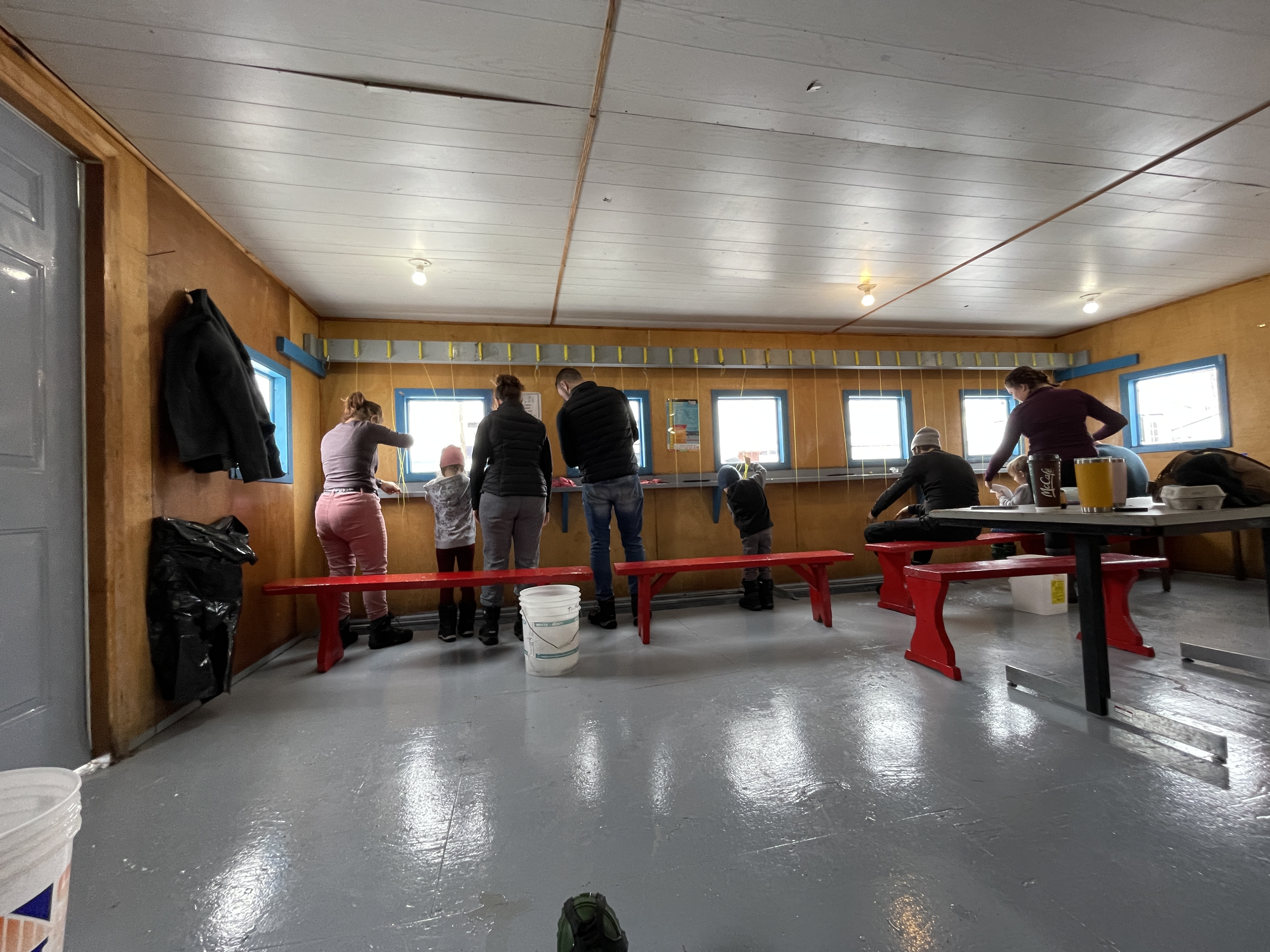
Interior

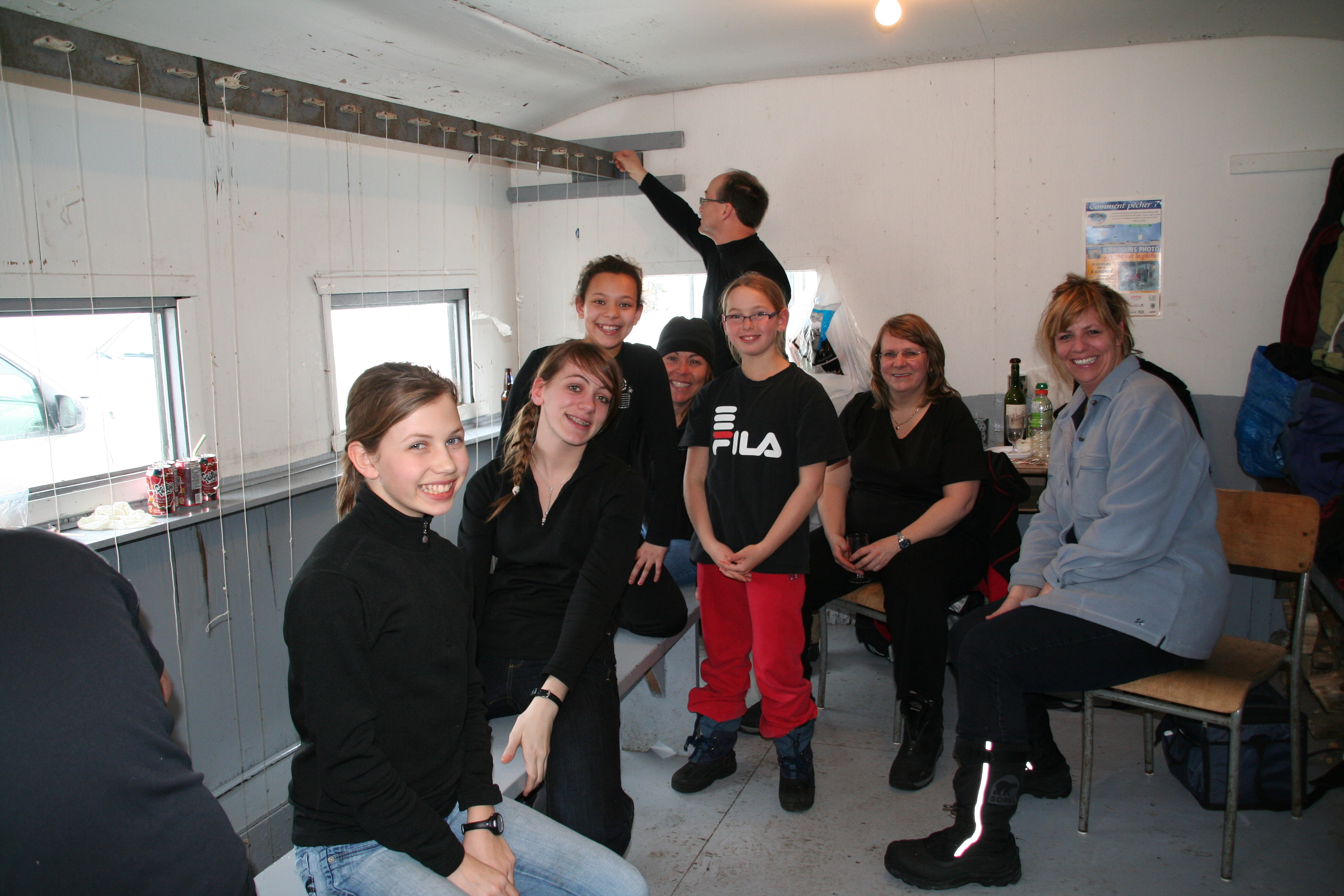
Fishing party
