= Ice jigger =

Device for setting fish nets under ice

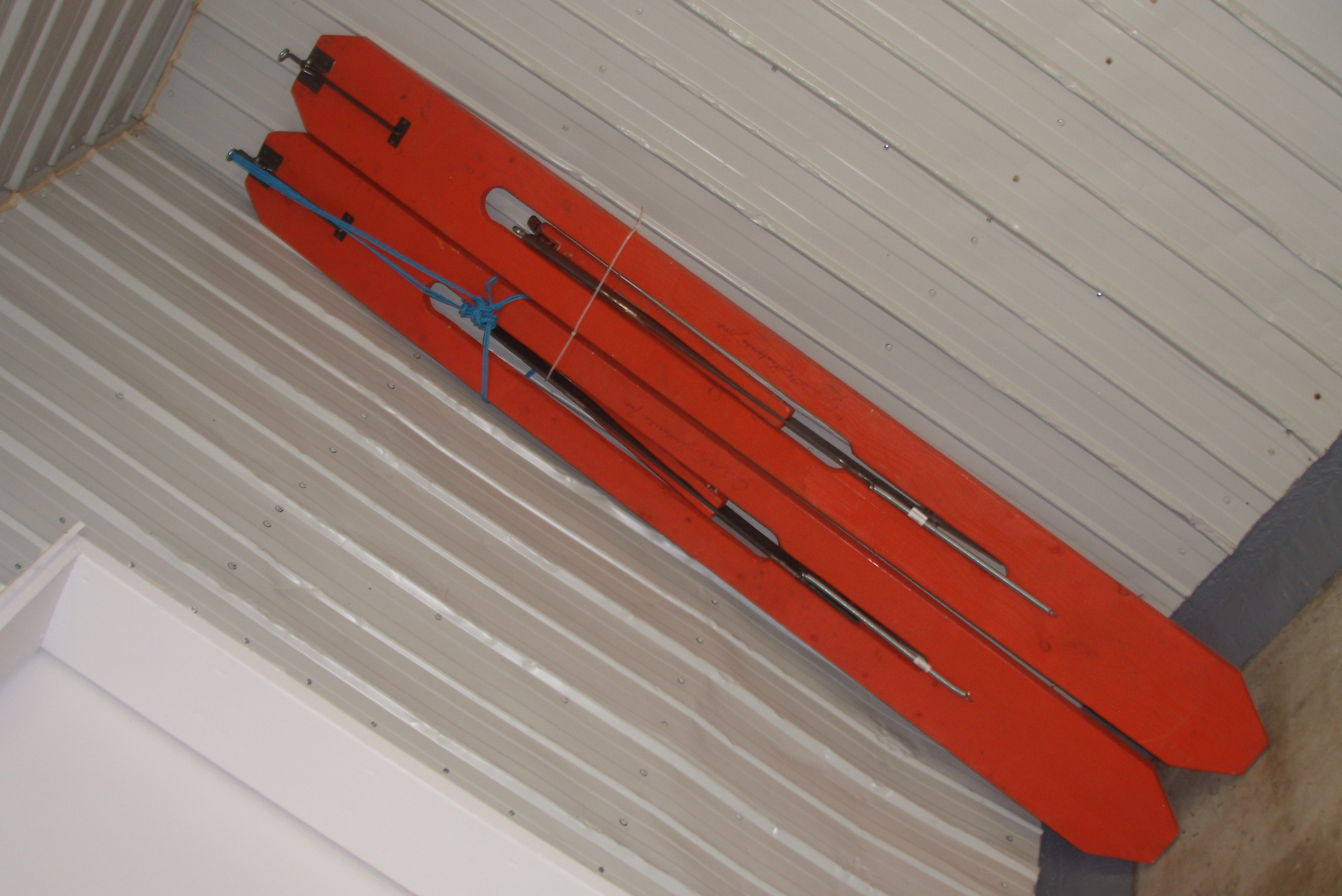
Two ice jiggers inside the fish loading and weighing area of J. Waite Fisheries Inc. in Buffalo Narrows Saskatchewan, Canada. These are about eight feet long.

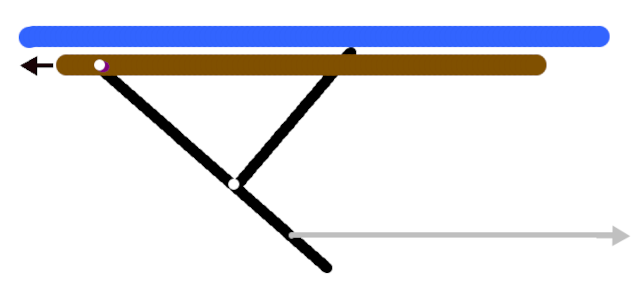
Working principle

The ice jigger also known as prairie ice jigger, or prairie jigger, is a device for setting a fishing net under the ice between two ice holes, invented by indigenous fishermen of Canada in the early 1900s.

The jigger consists of a slotted wooded board that floats under the ice surface and two levers connected in such a way that when a rope connected to one lever (arm) is pulled, the second lever (leg) jabs into the ice and pushes against the ice to move the board in the direction opposite to the rope pull. After each pull a spring resets the arm, and the action is repeated. In this way a person by an ice hole propels the jigger away. If the ice is transparent enough, one just makes another hole over the jigger when it moves far away. (Otherwise the progress of the jigger may be monitored by the tapping noise of the jigger's leg.) After that the jigger is pulled out of the second hole, together with the rope, and the net may be stretched under the ice using the rope from one hole to another.

The simple and effective design remained basically unchanged since its invention. Imler (1971) described the use of a radio transmitter to locate the jigger under heavy ice cover by Colorado fishery biologists.
