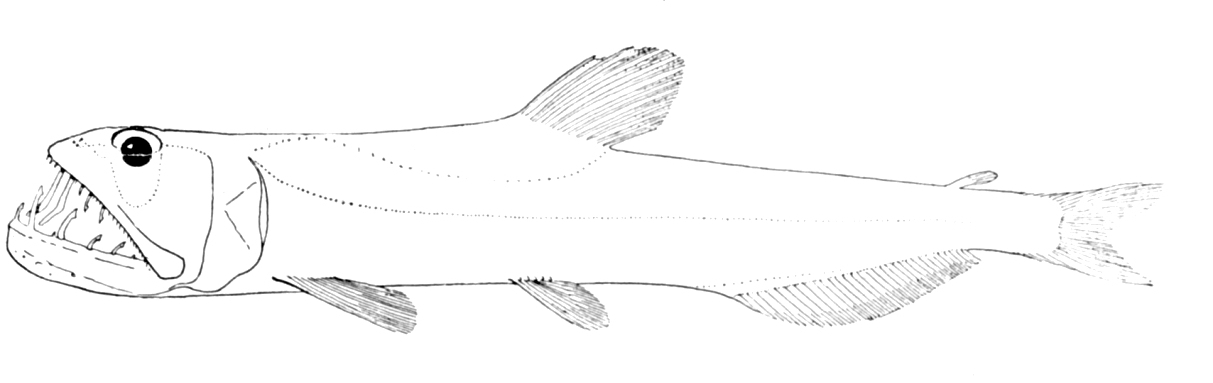

Scientific classification
- Kingdom: Animalia
- Phylum: Chordata
- Class: Actinopterygii
- Division: Teleostei
- Order: Aulopiformes
- Family: Evermannellidae
- Genus: Evermannella
- Species: E. balbo

Binomial name
- Evermannella balbo (A. Risso, 1820)

= Balbo sabretooth =

Species of fish

The balbo sabretooth (Evermannella balbo) is a sabertooth of the family Evermannellidae, found circumglobally in tropical and subtropical seas, at depths of between 100 and 1,000 m. Its length is up to 17 cm.

== Vision ==
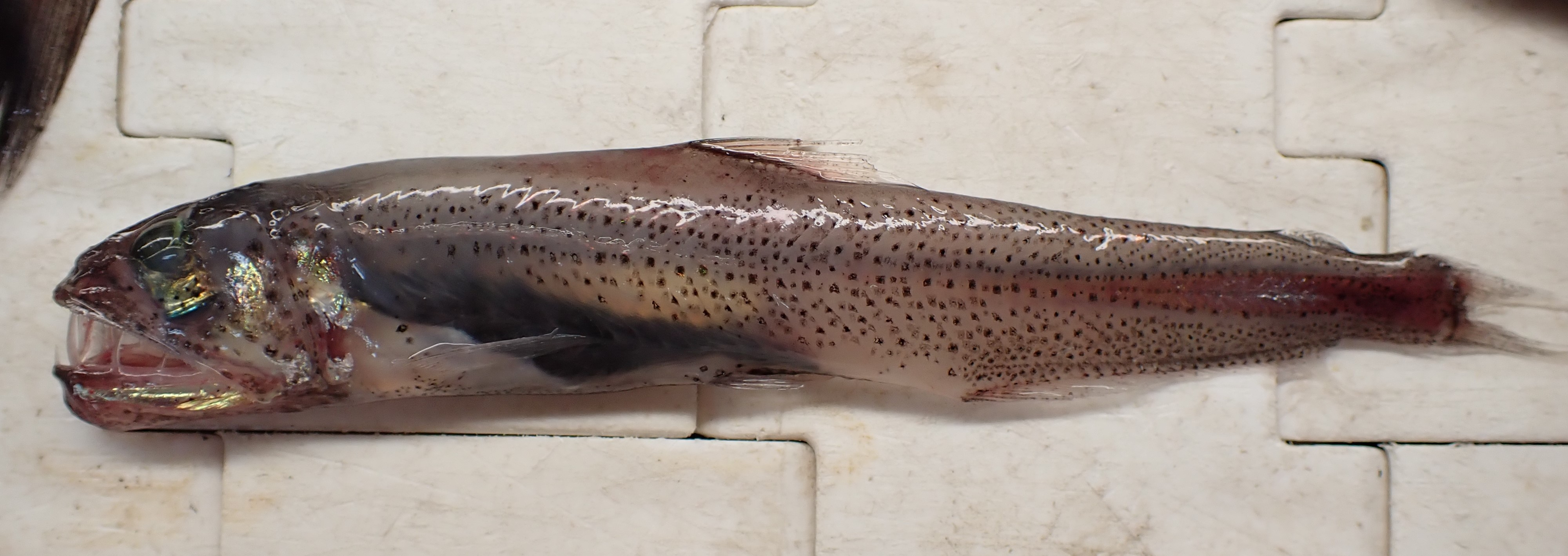
A freshly-caught specimen of E. balbo.

E. balbo, like other evermanellids, has eyes that possess radical adaptations to improve functioning in the specific light conditions of their mesopelagic environment. The dorsally-directed orientation of E. balbo's eyes allow for detection of backlit prey during daylight hours, while their tubular shape and large degree of binocular overlap improves acuity and may enable the fish to determine object distance. The lenses in this species are pigmented yellow-green, functioning as a filter that excludes short-wavelength light, improving detection of bioluminescence (and thus overcoming prey counterillumination). As the lenses have a field of view restricted to the ~50° of visual space directly above the animal, these fish possess "optical folds", analogous in function to the pearl organ found in the scopelarchids and ocular diverticula found in some opisthoproctids. These lamellated structures, found on the exterior lateral surface of the eye, direct incident light onto accessory retinae on the opposite wall of the eye. This allows E. balbo to detect bioluminescence occurring laterally and ventrally to the animal which may signal the presence of a potential mate, prey item, or predator.
