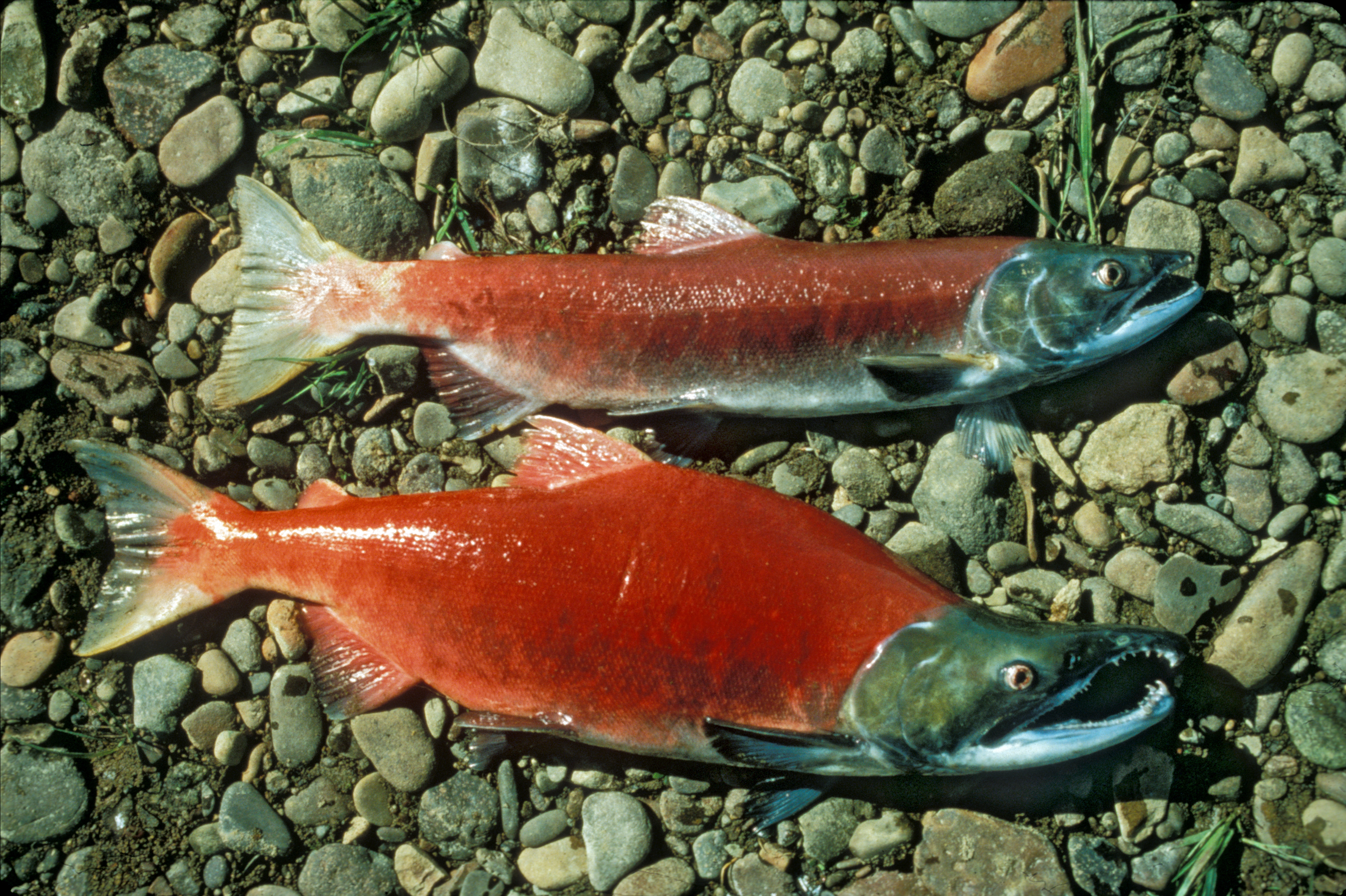
- Sockeye salmon, Oncorhynchus nerka Female (above) and male in mating season Note male with kype (hooked snout)

Scientific classification
- Kingdom: Animalia
- Phylum: Chordata
- Class: Actinopterygii
- Division: Teleostei
- Order: Salmoniformes
- Family: Salmonidae
- Subfamily: Salmoninae
- Genus: Oncorhynchus; Suckley, 1861

Type species
- Salmo gorbuscha (Walbaum, 1792)

Species
- § Species

= Oncorhynchus =

Oncorhynchus Temporal range: Late Miocene – recent

Genus of fishes

Oncorhynchus is a genus of ray-finned fish in the subfamily Salmoninae of the family Salmonidae, native to coldwater tributaries of the North Pacific basin. The genus contains sixteen extant species, namely six species of Pacific salmon and ten species of Pacific trout, all of which are migratory (either anadromous or potamodromous) mid-level predatory fish that display natal homing and semelparity.

The name of the genus is derived from Ancient Greek ὄγκος (ónkos), meaning "bend", and ῥύγχος (rhúnkhos), meaning "snout", in reference to the hooked secondary sexual characteristic — known as the kype — that the males develop on the lower jaw tip during mating season.

== Range ==
Salmon and trout within Oncorhynchus are native to the tributaries of the North Pacific Ocean, with their native ranges extend from the Bering Sea coasts southwards to as far as Taiwan in the west and Mexico in the east, although most of them are distributed in high-latitude cold waters from the Russian Far East to the Pacific Northwest. In North America, some subspecies of cutthroat trout (O. clarkii) have become landlocked populations native to endorheic waters in the Rocky Mountains and the Great Basin, while others have crossed the Continental Divide to inhabit the Rio Grande and western tributaries of the Mississippi River, both of which drain into the Gulf of Mexico instead of the Pacific Ocean. Several species of Oncorhynchus, such as the rainbow trout (O. mykiss) and Chinook salmon (O. tshawytscha), have been widely introduced into non-native waters around the globe, establishing self-sustaining wild populations.

The six Pacific salmons of Oncorhynchus are anadromous (migratory) and semelparous (die after spawning). Migration can be affected by parasites. Infected individuals can become weak and probably have shortened lifespans. Infection with parasites creates an effect known as culling whereby fish that are infected are less likely to complete the migration. Anadromous forms of Oncorhynchus mykiss known as steelhead are iteroparous. The coastal cutthroat trout (Oncorhynchus clarkii clarkii) is considered semi-anadromous, as it spends some time in the ocean, usually much closer to its native stream than its fully anadromous relatives.

== Evolution ==
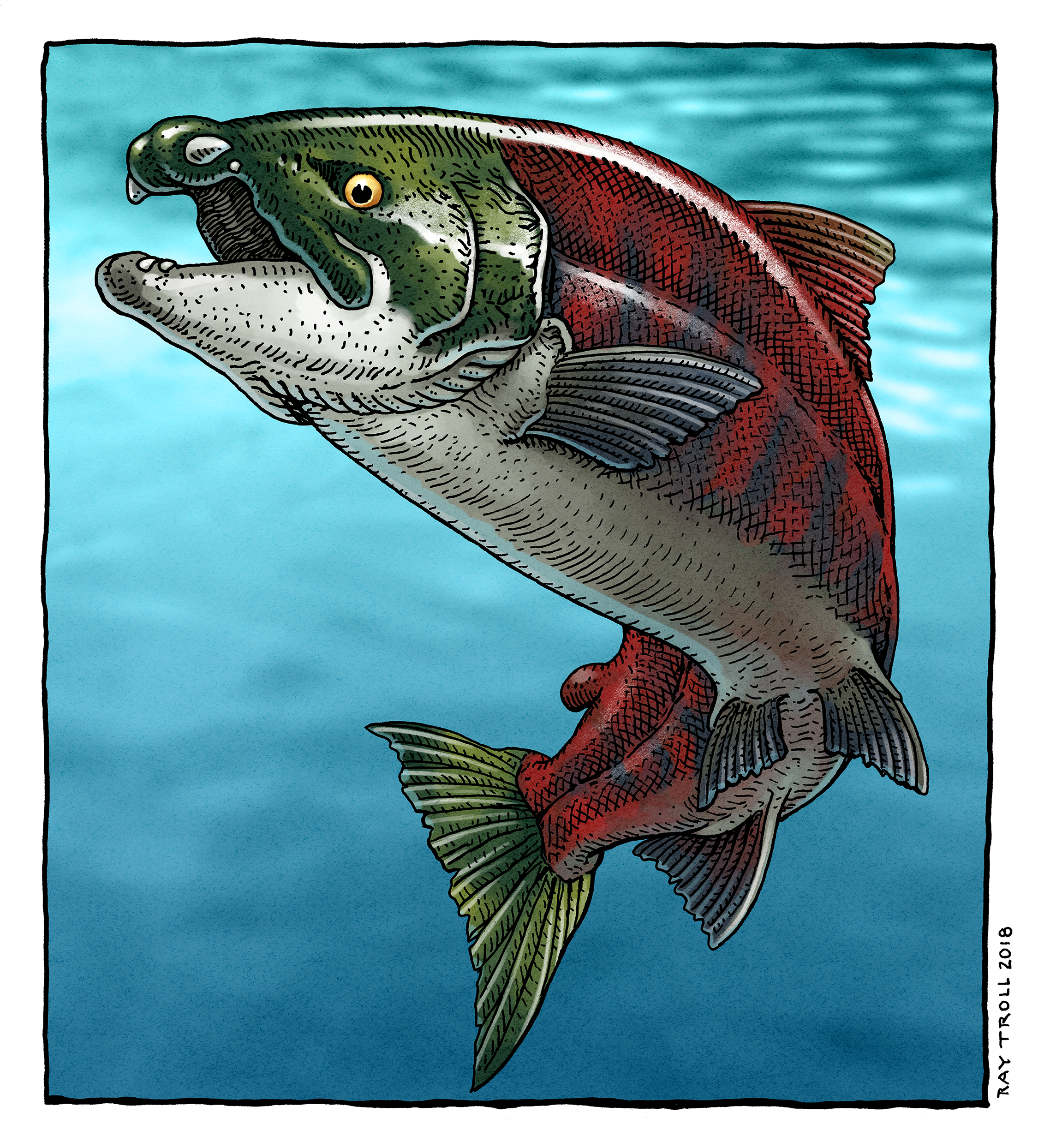
The extinct Oncorhynchus rastrosus was one of the largest salmonids.

Several Late Miocene (about 7 million years ago (Mya)) trout-like fossils in Idaho, in the Clarkia Lake beds, appear to be of Oncorhynchus. The presence of these species so far inland established Oncorhynchus was not only present in the Pacific drainages before the beginning of the Pliocene (5–6 Mya), but also that rainbow and cutthroat trout, and Pacific salmon lineages had diverged before the beginning of the Pliocene. Consequently, the split between Oncorhynchus and Salmo (Atlantic salmon) must have occurred well before the Pliocene. Suggested dates have gone back as far as the Early Miocene (about 20 Mya). One fossil species assigned to this genus, O. rastrosus, the spike-toothed salmon (synonym Smilodonichthys), is a 2.4 to 2.7 metres (7.9 to 8.9 ft) long species known from Late Miocene to Pliocene fossils. The prehistoric species O. australis (originally described in Salmo) inhabited the Lake Chapala basin of southwestern Mexico during the Pleistocene, making it the southernmost known salmonid to have inhabited North America.

Speciation among Oncorhynchus has been examined for decades, and a family "tree" is not yet completely developed for the Pacific salmonids. Mitochondrial DNA (mtDNA) research has been completed on a variety of Pacific trout and salmonid species, but the results do not necessarily agree with fossil research, or molecular research. Chum, pink and sockeye salmon lineages are generally agreed to have diverged in the sequence after other species. Montgomery (2000) discusses the pattern of the fossil record as compared to tectonic shifts in the plates of the Pacific Northwest of America. The (potential) divergence in Oncorhynchus lineages appear to follow the uprising of the Pacific Rim. The climatic and habitat changes that would follow such a geologic event are discussed, in the context of potential stressors leading to adaptation and speciation.

One interesting case involving speciation with salmon is that of the kokanee salmon (landlocked sockeye salmon). Kokanee sockeye evolve differently from anadromous sockeye—they reach the level of "biological species". Biological species—as opposed to morphological species—are defined by the capacity to maintain themselves in sympatry as independent genetic entities. This definition can be vexing because it apparently applies only to sympatry, and this limitation makes the definition difficult to apply. Examples in Washington State, Canada, and elsewhere have two populations living in the same lake, but spawning in different substrates at different times, and eating different food sources. There is no pressure to compete or interbreed (two responses when resources are short). These types of kokanee salmon show the principal attributes of a biological species: they are reproductively isolated and show strong resources partitioning.

== Decline of Oncorhynchus populations ==
A general decline in overall Pacific salmon populations began in the mid-19th century. As the result of western expansion and development in the U.S., experts estimate salmon populations in the Columbia River basin had been reduced to less than 20% of their pre-1850 levels by 1933. In 2008, Lackey estimated that Pacific salmon stocks in the Pacific Northwest were less than 10% of their pre-1850 numbers. Many of the remaining salmon runs are dominated by hatchery-raised salmon, not wild salmon. Many isolated subspecies of the Pacific trouts, particularly those of Oncorhynchus mykiss rainbow trout and Oncorhynchus clarkii cutthroat trout have declined in their native ranges. Many local populations or distinct population segments of anadromous forms of steelhead have declined in their native ranges. The resulting declines have resulted in a number of populations of Oncorhynchus species or subspecies being listed as either endangered, threatened or as "Species of Special Concern" by state, federal or international authorities. Two Oncorhynchus clarkii subspecies are considered extinct. Declines are attributed to a wide variety of causes—overfishing, habitat loss and degradation, artificial propagation, stocking, and hybridization with or competition with introduced, non-native species. For example, the yellowfin cutthroat trout (Oncorhynchus clarkii macdonaldi) is extinct as a result of the introduction of non-native rainbow trout into its native waters.

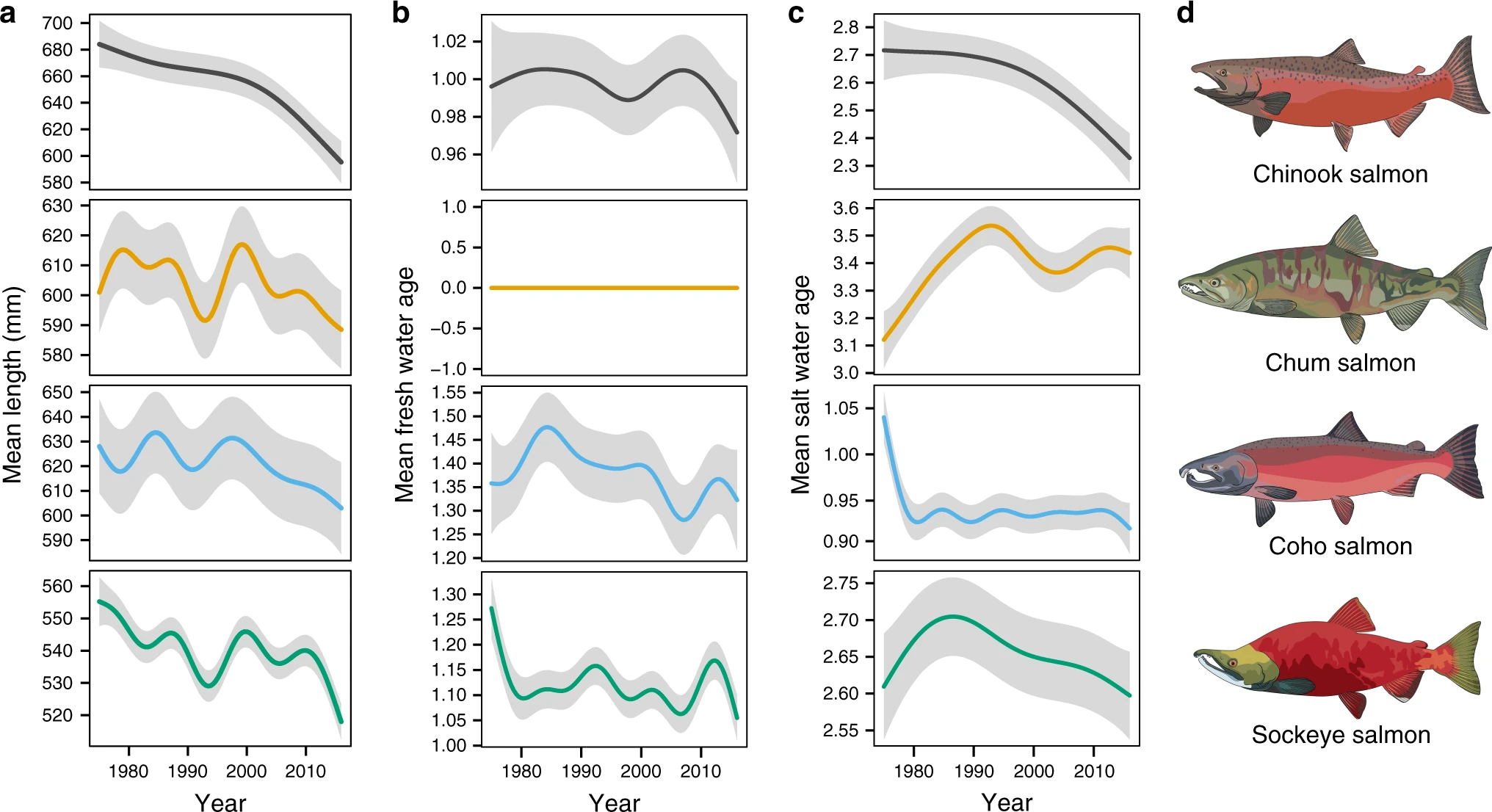
Measured recent declines in salmon body size.

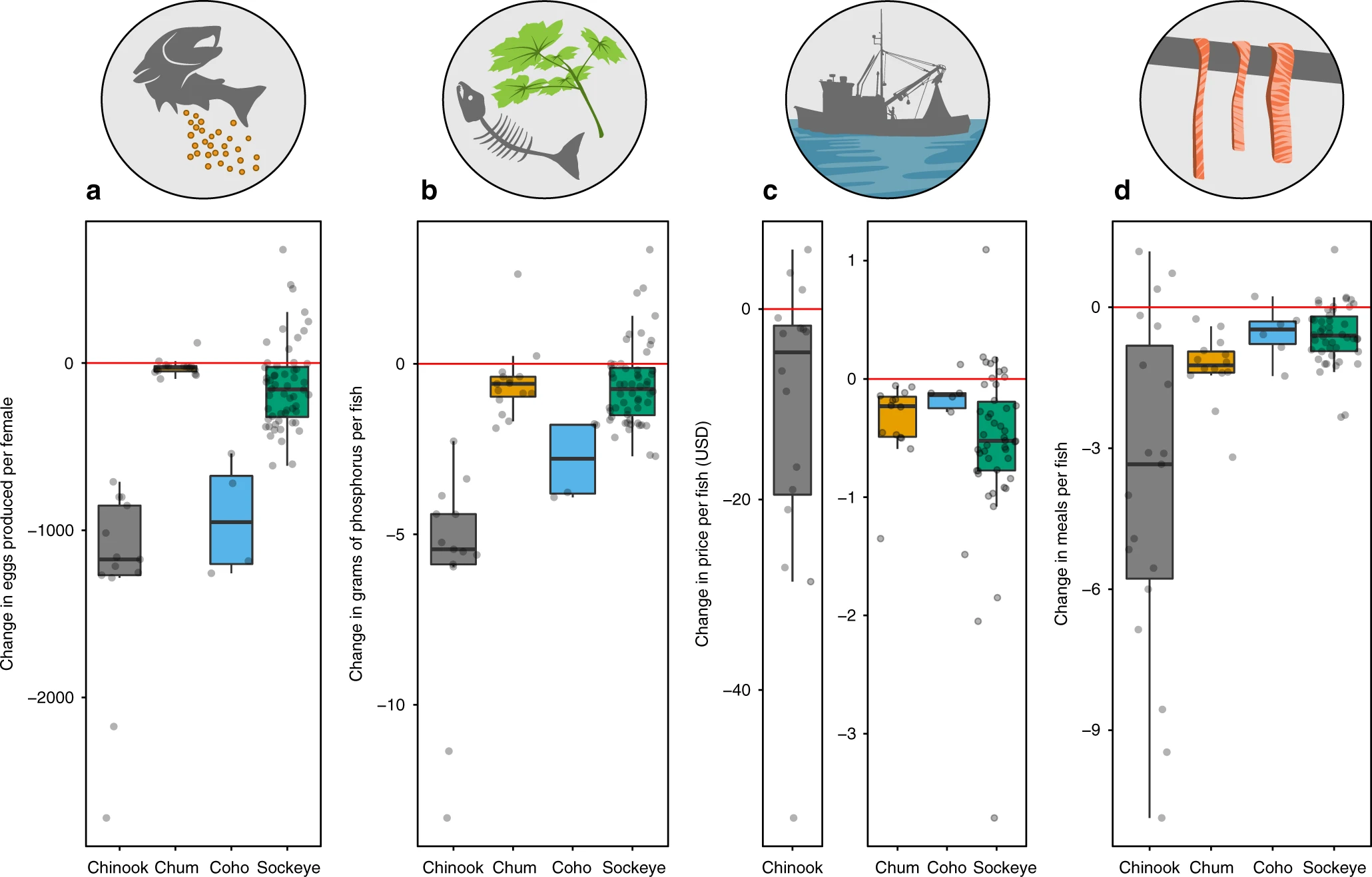
"Salmon body size declines over the past 30 years have negative consequences for a fecundity, b nutrient transport, c commercial fishery value, and d rural food security".

Pacific salmon are facing a widespread decline in body size. The mean body mass of sockeye salmon (O. nerka) decreased by 10% between 2000 and 2010. The mean body length of Oncorhynchus species decreased by 2–8% between 1990 and 2010. Salmon body size is decreasing due to a variety of evolutionary forces, including dams, fishing practices, climate change, and increased competition in the ocean. This trend in salmon size is expected to decrease nutrient cycling and salmon reproductive success while hurting the success of commercial fisheries and rural communities who rely on salmon for survival.

=== Influence of hatcheries ===
Declines in the abundance of wild salmon due to over fishing placed greater pressure on hatcheries to increase production and restore the wild salmon stock to supply fisheries. The problem is that hatcheries can never truly replicate the environment of wild salmon, an issue which often results in physiological and behavioral differences between wild salmon and those reared in hatcheries. These differences are often the product of genetic changes associated with inbreeding, artificial selection, and natural selection, as well as different environmental pressures acting on hatchery fish than wild populations. Due to the size selective nature of fishing favoring larger fish, a reduction in average size of the adult salmon has been observed over time. The smaller salmon make a greater proportion of the remaining individuals continuing the population, and problems arise when these hatchery-reared fish are introduced into the wild populations. Unlike wild salmon, larger salmon are selected for in hatcheries and are typically much larger than wild salmon. The result is that hatchery-produced salmon tend to out-compete wild salmon for space, food, and other resources. Some salmon species in hatcheries exhibit predatory behavior toward wild salmon because they grow to be much larger. Regardless of whether predation is observed, natural social interactions are disturbed by the release of large numbers of hatchery-reared salmon where wild populations are low because salmon in hatcheries naturally have a higher propensity towards aggressive behavior.

Overall, natural salmon populations are put at risk when hatchery-reared salmon populations are introduced due to competition for resources, predation by larger individuals, and negative social interactions that upset the natural order observed in wild salmon populations. As a result, wild salmon populations are steadily dropping as the pressure to continue breeding salmon in hatcheries increases. Conservation efforts that work to place limitations on hatcheries to increase the wild salmon populations are hindered by financial pressures because hatcheries effectively support many states economically by accounting for over 70% of the salmon harvested for recreational and commercial purposes.

=== Influence of overfishing ===
Pacific salmon are harvested throughout the world as a source of food in countries ranging from the United States to South Korea. Over the past century, Pacific salmon have been extensively fished through both recreational, artisan and commercial fishing. In fact, since the 1970s there has been a nearly threefold increase in catch of Pacific salmon. As this catch has increased, a selection of reduced body size has been observed. In Japanese chum salmon, for example, between 1970 and 1988 there has been a continuous decrease in body weight averaging between 11 and 32 percent. In part, this decline in body weight has been related to the size selective effect of fishing gear used in the harvesting of salmon populations. Salmon of larger body weight are more apt to be caught during fishing efforts, causing lower body weight to be a beneficial character trait for survival. Thus, Pacific salmon have become continuously smaller in body size. However, studies have also shown that for Pacific salmon, a larger mean size at the time of reproduction increases the survival of offspring. The life history of salmon favors delayed reproduction because fecundity increased with body size. Consequently, the smaller body size of salmon results in a negative impact on population growth by decreasing the survivability of progeny, and thus decreasing the growth rate of populations. This reduction of productivity in Pacific salmon is, in part, seeded in overfishing and has caused a reduction in population sizes throughout Pacific salmon species. Today, it seems that population numbers of Pacific salmon are on the rise; however, the consequences from the overfishing in the 70s and 80s are still being reflected, with the average body size of salmon being smaller than before the event of overfishing.

== Conservation ==
=== Canadian efforts ===
There has been evidence that the sockeye salmon are affected by thermal conditions and their responses to temperature are relatively strong and tend to vary from region to region. Canada has also used the Species at Risk Act to recognize the importance of biological diversity when it comes to the conservation of the salmon population. This means that multiple species of salmon would be looked at when it comes to conservation as well as multiple areas that each species live in. COSEWIC, a Canadian organization for the conservation of species, has named the Interior Fraser River Coho, the Cultus Lake Sockeye, and the Sakinaw Lake Sockeye to all be endangered. In British Columbia sockeye salmon in four different watersheds were certified by the Marine Stewardship Council, or MSC, as sustainable fisheries in July 2010 and the certification is good for a period of five years. In 2011 MSC also certified the Pink Salmon Fishery and as of 2012 The Chum Salmon Fisheries started their review under the MSC to become certified as a sustainable fishery.

=== American efforts ===
The US government has been working to develop a nationwide policy for the salmon populations. The Pacific Salmon Stronghold Conservation Act was re-submitted to congress and if passed will create geographic strongholds for salmon populations. Other policies include the Wild Salmon Policy which was enacted in 2005; its number one focus is the conservation of salmon off of the coasts. Even localized policies have begun, with one in Oregon which focuses on the southernmost watershed and was approved January 2013. In the Alaskan efforts, there is evidence of eight known regional groups of survival. It is also seen that the emigration of smolts (young salmon) from freshwater to other areas such as marine areas have shown significant consequences on the survival of different salmon groups. The Alaska Department of Fish and Game first received MSC, Marine Stewardship Council, Certification in sustainable seafood back in 2000. Each certification is good for a period of five years, with yearly check ups to ensure that the fishery remains sustainable. It was renewed again in 2007, but in 2012 The ADFG left the program. The Annette Island Reserve salmon fishery is under the control of the Metlakatla Indian community and as such was not included in the previous assessments of the Alaskan fisheries. It received its sustainability certification in June 2011. The Wild Salmon Center is a nonprofit organization that works on promoting conservation efforts for salmon worldwide and in the United States; it has helped secure protected watershed areas for Russian and west coast salmon. Other efforts of the Wild Salmon Center include combating illegal fishing, maintaining sustainable fisheries, and creating local watersheds as new habitats.

=== Russian efforts ===
Poaching is a threat to Oncorhynchus salmon and steelhead populations in Russia. It is estimated that illegal catching of salmon is 1.5 times more than the reported catch. The Wild Salmon Center is working with Russian authorities to try to help improve traceability systems so that markets can distinguish between legal sustainable salmon and the illegal salmon. The Wild Salmon Center has secured some of its protected locations for the salmon populations. In efforts with the WWF, the Wild Salmon Center was also able to have a Sockeye Salmon fishery certified as completely sustainable in 2012. The Iturup Island Pink and Chum Salmon Fishery was first certified in 2009 and was the first Russian salmon fishery to receive certification in sustainability by MSC. Other fisheries that were certified by MSC include the Northeast Sakhalin Island Pink Salmon, certified in June 2012, and the Ozernaya River Sockeye Salmon, certified in September 2012. The Aniva Bay Pink Salmon and the Sakhalin Island Pink salmon are both under review by the MSC.

== Introductions and aquaculture ==
Several species of Oncorhynchus have been successfully introduced into non-native waters, establishing self-sustaining wild populations. The rainbow trout Oncorhynchus mykiss is the most widely introduced species of the genus. Rainbow trout, Chinook salmon Oncorhynchus tshawytscha and Coho salmon Oncorhynchus kisutch have established wild, self-sustaining populations in the Great Lakes and Chinook in New Zealand (known there as quinnat, king or spring salmon). Aquaculture of Chinook and Coho salmon and rainbow trout are major industries in Chile and Australia. Chinook from Chile were released into Argentinean rivers and there were stockings of Coho and sockeye salmon and rainbow trout in Patagonia.

== Species ==
Some of the species in this genus are highly variable and a number of now-obsolete taxa have been described. In 1989, morphological and genetic studies by Gerald Smith and Ralph Stearley indicated that trouts of the Pacific basin were genetically closer to Pacific salmon (Onchorhynchus species) than to the Salmos – brown trout (Salmo trutta) or Atlantic salmon (Salmo salar) of the Atlantic basin. Thus, in 1989, taxonomic authorities moved the Rainbow, Cutthroat and other Pacific basin trouts into the genus Oncorhynchus.

=== Extant species ===
Currently, 16 species and numerous subspecies in this genus are recognized: Behnke (2002) and Fujioka et al., (2025).

Image	Scientific name	Common name(s)	Subspecies	Distribution
	Oncorhynchus apache (R. R. Miller, 1972)	Apache trout, Arizona trout		the upper Salt River watershed (Black and White rivers) and the upper Little Colorado River watershed
	Oncorhynchus biwaensis (Fujioka et al., 2025)	Biwa trout, Biwamasu, Biwa salmon		Lake Biwa
	Oncorhynchus chrysogaster (Needham & Gard, 1964)	Mexican golden trout		the headwaters of the Fuerte River, Sinaloa River, and Culiacán River drainages in the Sierra Madre Occidental
	Oncorhynchus clarkii (Richardson, 1836)	Coastal cutthroat trout		The Pacific Northwest coast from Alaska through British Columbia into northern California, in the Cascade Range
	Oncorhynchus henshawi (Gill & Jordan, 1878)	Lahontan cutthroat trout	O. h. alvordensis (Behnke, 2002) – Alvord cutthroat trout† (extinct); O. h. henshawi (Richardson, 1836) – (Western Basin) Lahontan cutthroat trout; O. h. humboldtensis (Trotter and Benke., 2008) Humboldt cutthroat trout (Eastern Basin); O. c. seleniris (John O. Snyder, 1933) – Paiute cutthroat trout; O. henshawi ssp., Quinn River cutthroat trout (Northwestern Basin); O. h. ssp. Willow-Whitehorse Basin cutthroat trout, considered a separate subspecies by Behnke (2002) and others but not by Trotter and Behnke (2008).	The Great Basin and eastern Sierra Nevada Mountains
	Oncorhynchus virginalis (Girard, 1857)	Rocky Mountain Cutthroat trout, Black-spotted Cutthroat trout	• O. v. bouvieri (Bendire, 1882) – Yellowstone cutthroat trout: O. v. pleuriticus (Cope, 1872) – Colorado River cutthroat trout; O. v. stomias (Cope, 1871) – Greenback cutthroat trout; O. v. utah (Suckley, 1874) – Bonneville cutthroat trout; O. v. virginalis (Girard, 1856) – Rio Grande cutthroat trout	Distributed across various drainage basins in the Central and Southern Rocky Mountains, Eastern Great Basin, the Snake River Plain, and historically extended the Davis Mountains, TX.
	Oncorhynchus lewisi (Girard, 1856)	Westslope cutthroat trout		Northern rocky mountains including the upper Columbia and Missouri Rivers drainages with unique isolated populations in Lake Chelan and Methow River, WA and the John Day River, OR
	Oncorhynchus gilae (R. R. Miller, 1950)	Gila trout		the Gila River in Arizona and New Mexico
	Oncorhynchus gorbuscha (Walbaum, 1792)	pink salmon, humpback salmon		the Pacific and Arctic coastal waters and rivers, from the Sacramento River in northern California to the Mackenzie River in Canada; and in the west from the Lena River in Siberia to Korea and Honshu, Japan
	Oncorhynchus kawamurae (D. S. Jordan & E. A. McGregor, 1925)	kunimasu, black kokanee		Lake Saiko
	Oncorhynchus keta (Walbaum, 1792)	chum salmon, dog salmon, keta salmon, silverbrite salmon		the Yukon River and deep into the Amur River basin in Asia. In lesser numbers they migrate thousands of kilometres up the Mackenzie River, the North Pacific, in the waters of Korea, Japan, and the Okhotsk and Bering Seas (Kamchatka, Chukotka, the Kuril Islands, Sakhalin, Khabarovsk Krai, Primorsky Krai), British Columbia in Canada, and from Alaska to California in the United States
	Oncorhynchus kisutch (Walbaum, 1792)	coho salmon, silver salmon, silvers		both sides of the North Pacific Ocean, from Hokkaidō, Japan and eastern Russia, around the Bering Sea to mainland Alaska, and south to Monterey Bay, California
	Oncorhynchus masou (Brevoort, 1856)	masu salmon, cherry salmon, Japanese salmon, seema	O. m. masou (Brevoort, 1856) – masu salmon, cherry salmon, Japanese salmon; O. m. formosanus (D. S. Jordan & Ōshima, 1919) – Formosan landlocked salmon, Taiwanese salmon; O. m. macrostomus (Günther, 1877) – amago, red-spotted masu salmon; O. m. ishikawae (Brevoort, 1856) – Satsukimasu salmon, masu salmon, yamame; O. m. rhodurus D. S. Jordan & E. A. McGregor, 1925 – Previously identified as Biwa trout, no common name; O. m. var. iwame Seiro Kimura & M. Nakamura, 1961 – Iwame trout, markless trout (intrapopoulation variant)	Kamchatka, the Kuril Islands, Sakhalin, and Primorsky Krai south through Korea, Taiwan, and Japan
	Oncorhynchus mykiss (Walbaum, 1792)	rainbow trout, steelhead, ocean trout, redband trout	O. m. mykiss (Walbaum, 1792) – Kamchatkan rainbow trout; O. m. aguabonita (D. S. Jordan, 1892) – golden trout; O. m. irideus f. beardsleei – Beardslee trout, (sometimes O. m. beardsleei); O. m. newberrii (Richardson, 1836) – Great Basin redband trout; O. m. irideus (Walbaum, 1792) – coastal rainbow trout; O. m. gairdneri (Richardson, 1836) – Columbia River redband trout; O. m. stonei – McCloud River redband trout; O. m. nelsoni (Evermann, 1908) – Baja California rainbow trout; O. m. ssp. – Mexican native trout; O. m. gilberti – Kern River rainbow trout; O. m. whitei (Evermann, 1906) – Little Kern golden trout	the Pacific basin, from the Kamchatka Peninsula in Russia, east along the Aleutian Islands, throughout southwestern Alaska, the Pacific Coast of British Columbia and southeast Alaska, and south along the west coast of the U.S. to northern Mexico
	Oncorhynchus nerka (Walbaum, 1792)	sockeye salmon, red salmon, blueback salmon, kokanee		the Columbia River in the eastern Pacific (although individuals have been spotted as far south as the 10 Mile River on the Mendocino Coast of California) and in northern Hokkaidō Island in Japan in the western Pacific
	Oncorhynchus tshawytscha (Walbaum, 1792)	Chinook salmon, blackmouth, black salmon, chub salmon, Columbia River salmon, hookbill salmon, king salmon, Quinnat salmon, spring salmon, Tyee salmon, winter salmon		the Ventura River in California in the south to Kotzebue Sound in Alaska in the north

=== Fossil species ===
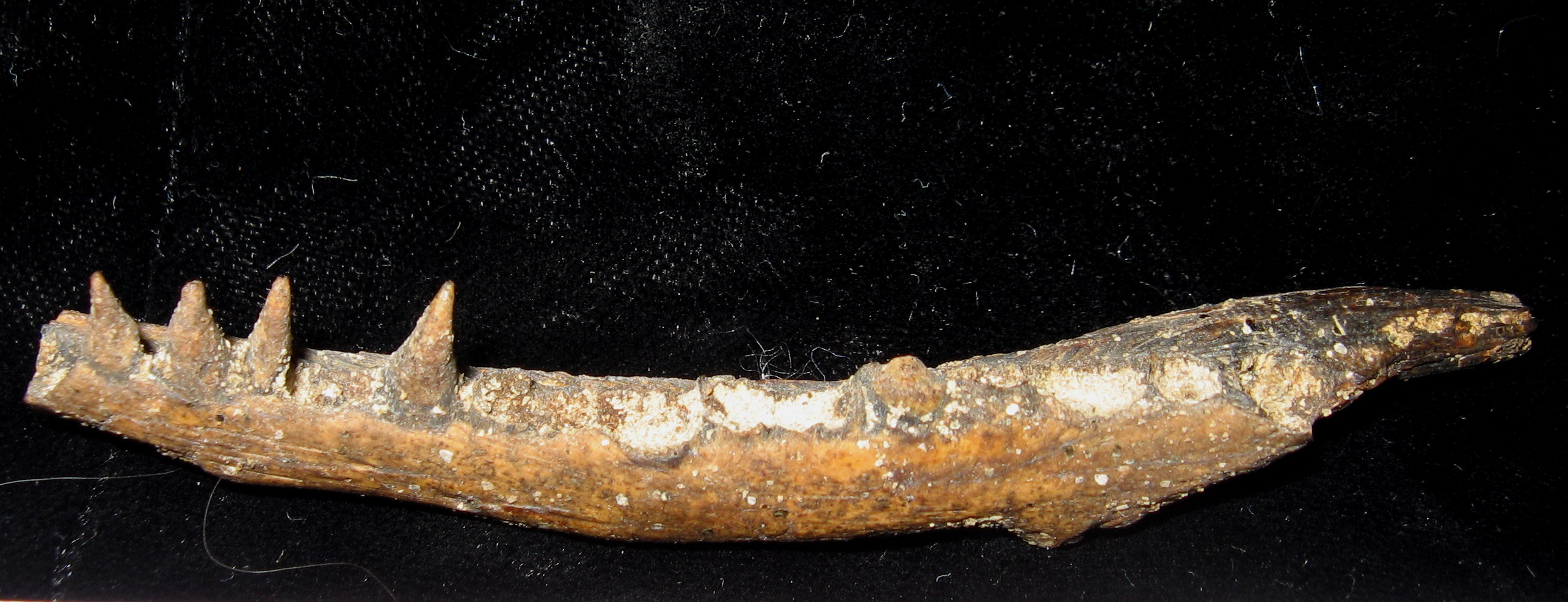
Fossil jaw of the extinct Oncorhynchus lacustris

Based partly on Stearley & Smith:

- †Oncorhynchus australis (Cavender & Miller, 1982) (=Salmo australis) - Pleistocene of Jalisco, Mexico (Chapala Formation).
- †Oncorhynchus belli Stearley & Smith, 2018 (Truckee trout) - late Miocene of Nevada (Truckee Formation). Potentially related to the cutthroat trout.
- †Oncorhynchus ketopsis Eiting & Smith, 2007 - Miocene of Oregon (Chalk Hills Formation). Likely belonging to the Pacific salmon group.
- †Oncorhynchus lacustris (Cope, 1870) - late Miocene to late Pliocene of Idaho. Likely belonging to the redband trout group.
- †Oncorhynchus rastellus Stearley & Smith, 2018 (small spiketooth salmon) - Miocene of Idaho (Chalk Hills Formation). Belongs to the Pacific salmon group.
- †Oncorhynchus rastrosus (Cavender & Miller, 1972) (spike-toothed salmon) - middle Miocene to early Pliocene of western North America and Japan. Likely belonging to the Pacific salmon group.
- †Oncorhynchus salax Smith, 1975 - Miocene/Pliocene of Idaho (Glenns Ferry Formation). Likely belonging to the redband trout group.
