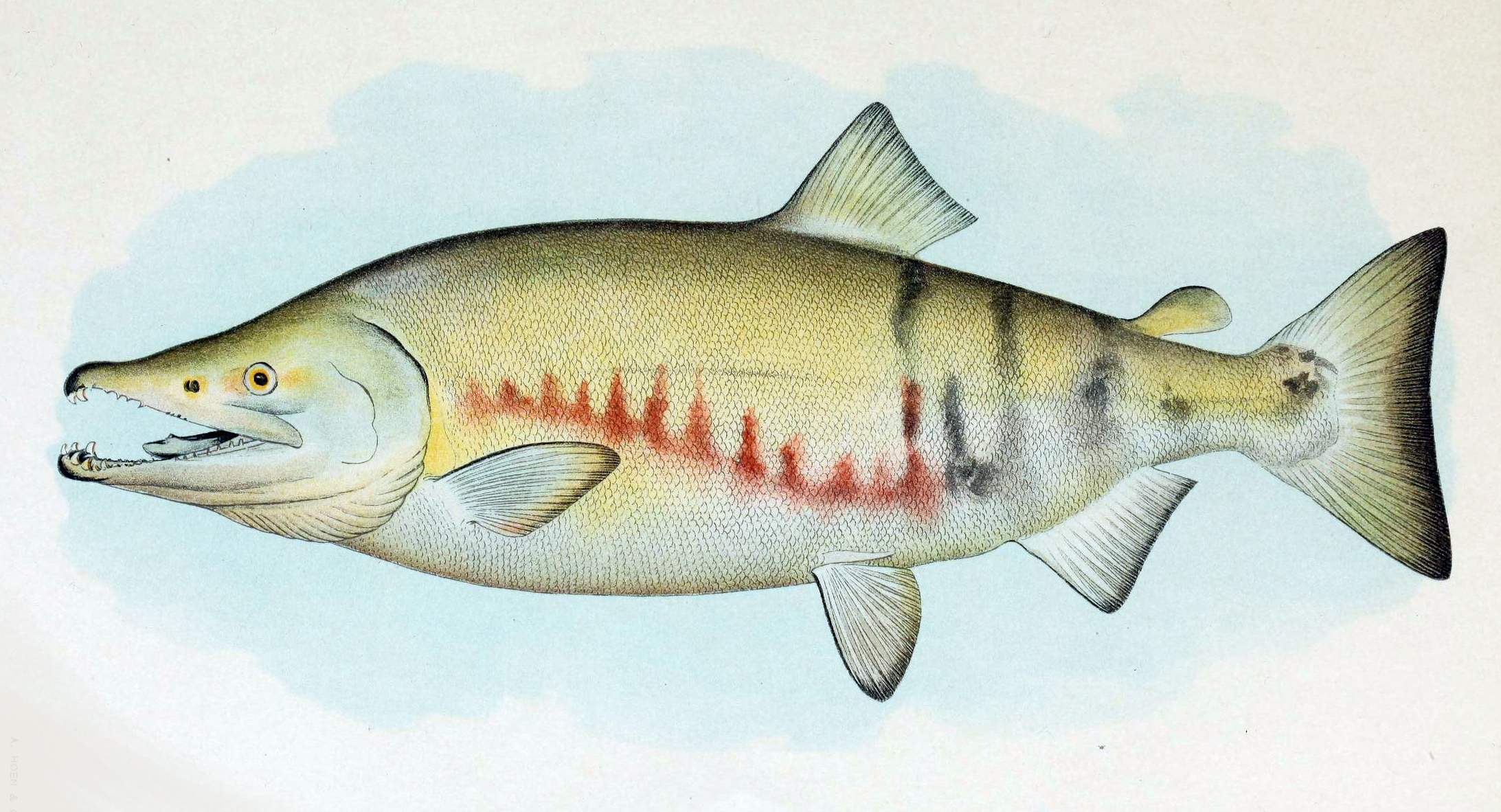

Conservation status
- Least Concern (IUCN 3.1)

Scientific classification
- Kingdom: Animalia
- Phylum: Chordata
- Class: Actinopterygii
- Division: Teleostei
- Order: Salmoniformes
- Family: Salmonidae
- Genus: Oncorhynchus
- Species: O. keta

Binomial name
- Oncorhynchus keta (Walbaum, 1792)

= Chum salmon =

Species of fish

The chum salmon (Oncorhynchus keta), also known as dog salmon or keta salmon, is a species of anadromous salmonid fish from the genus Oncorhynchus (Pacific salmon) native to the coastal rivers of the North Pacific and the Beringian Arctic. The English name "chum salmon" comes from the Chinook Jargon term tsəm, meaning "spotted" or "marked"; while keta in the scientific name comes from Russian, which in turn comes from the Evenki language of Eastern Siberia.

In Japan, chum salmon is also known as the white salmon (白鮭 シロサケ, shiro sake), autumn salmon (秋鮭 アキサケ, aki sake) or simply "the salmon" (鮭 サケ, sa ke), while historically it was known in kun'yomi as "stone katsura fish" (石桂魚 さけ, sa ke) up until the Meiji period. In Greater China, it is known academically as the "hook-snout salmon" (Chinese: 钩吻鲑), but is more often called the damaha fish (simplified Chinese: 大马哈鱼; traditional Chinese: 大麻哈魚), which is borrowed from dawa ịmaχa, the Nanai name of the fish used by the Hezhe minority in northern Northeast China.

== Description ==
Chum salmon, raw
Nutritional value per 100 g (3.5 oz)
- Energy: 502 kJ (120 kcal)
- Carbohydrates: 0 g
- Dietary fiber: 0 g
- Fat: 3.77 g
- Saturated: 0.84 g
- Monounsaturated: 1.541 g
- Polyunsaturated: 0.898 g
- Protein: 20.14 g
Amino acids
Tryptophan	0.226 g
Threonine	0.883 g
Isoleucine	0.928 g
Leucine	1.637 g
Lysine	1.849 g
Methionine	0.596 g
Cystine	0.216 g
Phenylalanine	0.786 g
Tyrosine	0.68 g
Valine	1.037 g
Arginine	1.205 g
Histidine	0.593 g
Alanine	1.218 g
Aspartic acid	2.062 g
Glutamic acid	3.006 g
Glycine	0.967 g
Proline	0.712 g
Serine	0.822 g
Vitamins and minerals
Vitamins	Quantity %DV^{†}
Vitamin A equiv.	3% 30 μg
Thiamine (B1)	7% 0.08 mg
Riboflavin (B2)	14% 0.18 mg
Niacin (B3)	44% 7 mg
Pantothenic acid (B5)	15% 0.75 mg
Vitamin B6	24% 0.4 mg
Folate (B9)	1% 4 μg
Vitamin B12	125% 3 μg
Vitamin C	0% 0 mg
Vitamin E	7% 1.09 mg
Minerals	Quantity %DV^{†}
Calcium	1% 11 mg
Iron	3% 0.55 mg
Magnesium	5% 22 mg
Manganese	1% 0.015 mg
Phosphorus	23% 283 mg
Potassium	14% 429 mg
Selenium	66% 36.5 μg
Sodium	2% 50 mg
Zinc	4% 0.47 mg
- Other constituents: Quantity
- Water: 75.38 g
- Alcohol (ethanol): 0 g
- ^{†}Percentages estimated using US recommendations for adults, except for potassium, which is estimated based on expert recommendation from the National Academies.

The body of the chum salmon is deeper than most salmonid species. In common with other species found in the Pacific, the anal fin has 12 to 20 rays, compared with a maximum of 12 in European species. Chum have an ocean coloration of silvery blue green with some indistinct spotting in a darker shade, and a rather paler belly. When they move into fresh water the color changes to dark olive green and the belly color deepens. When adults are near spawning, they have purple blotchy streaks near the caudal peduncle, darker towards the tail. Spawning males typically grow an elongated snout or kype, their lower fins become tipped with white and they have enlarged teeth. Some researchers speculate these characteristics are used to compete for mates.

=== Sizes ===
Adult chum salmon usually weigh from 4.4 to 10.0 kg (9.7 to 22.0 lb) with an average length of 60.0 cm (23.6 in). The all-tackle world record for chum recognized by the IGFA is 35 lb (15.88 kg) and 112.0 cm (44.1 in) caught by Todd Johansson on July 11, 1995 at Edye Pass (a channel between Prescott and Porcher Islands in the Hecate Strait) in the North Coast region of British Columbia; while the all-tackle length world record is 71.0 cm (28.0 in) caught by Vicki D. Martin on October 20, 2021 at Wynoochee River in Washington.

== Life cycle ==
Chum live for an average of three to five years, and chum in Alaska mature at the age of five years.

=== Spawning ===
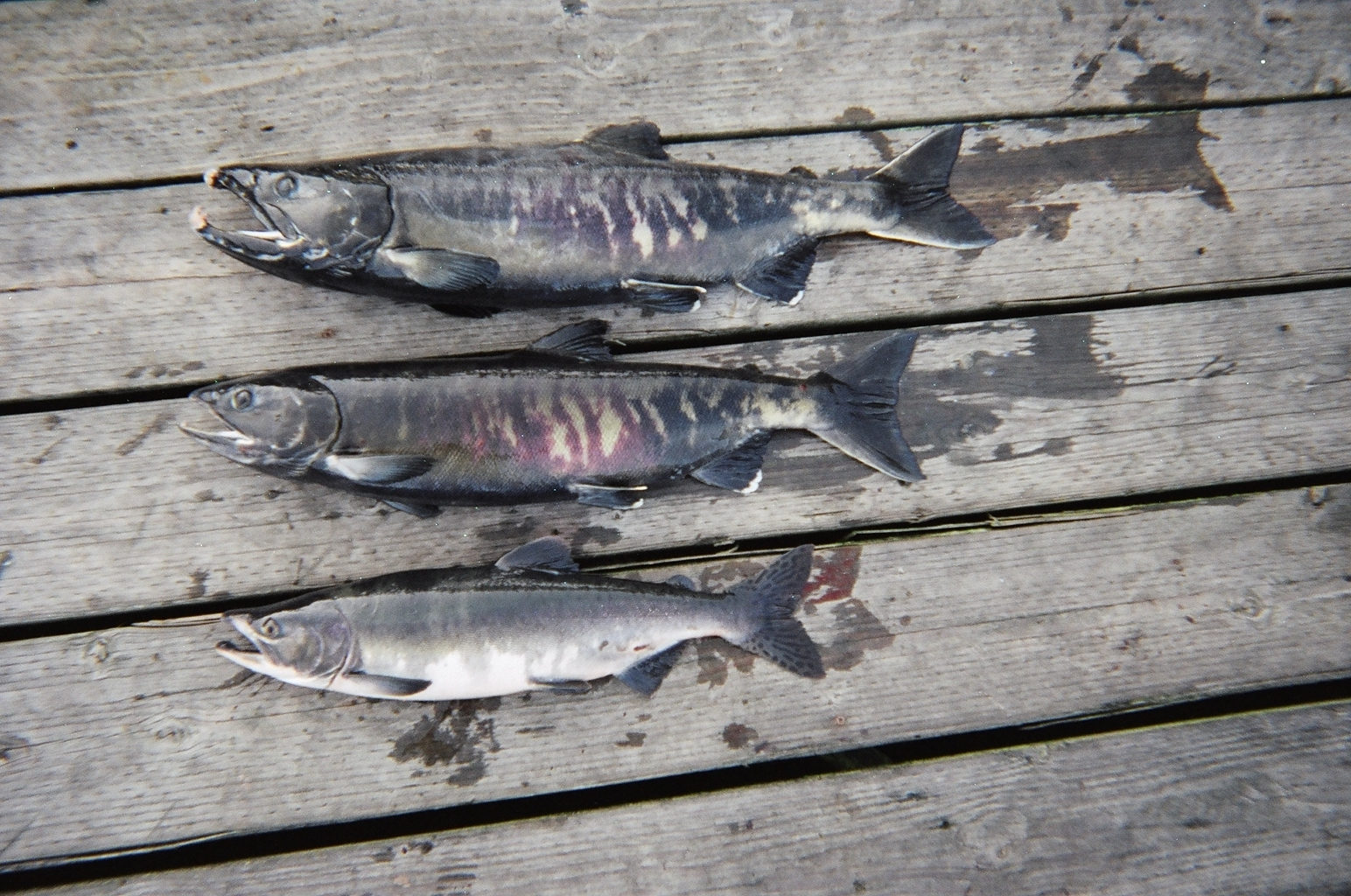
Male chum salmon, female chum salmon and female pink salmon

Most chum salmon spawn in small streams and intertidal zones. Some chum travel more than 3,200 km (2,000 mi) up the Yukon River. Chum fry migrate out to sea from March through July, almost immediately after becoming free swimmers. They spend one to three years traveling very long distances in the ocean. These are the last salmon to spawn (November to January) in some regions. In Alaska they are the first to spawn in June and August and are then followed by pink and coho salmon. They die about two weeks after they return to the freshwater to spawn. They utilize the lower tributaries of the watershed, tend to build nests called redds, really little more than protected depressions in the gravel, in shallow edges of the watercourse and at the tail end of deep pools. The female lays eggs in the redd, the male sprays milt on the eggs, and the female covers the eggs with gravel. The female can lay up to 4000 eggs.

=== Diet ===
Juvenile chum eat zooplankton and insects. Recent studies show that they also eat comb jellies. As adults, they eat smaller fish.

== Distribution ==
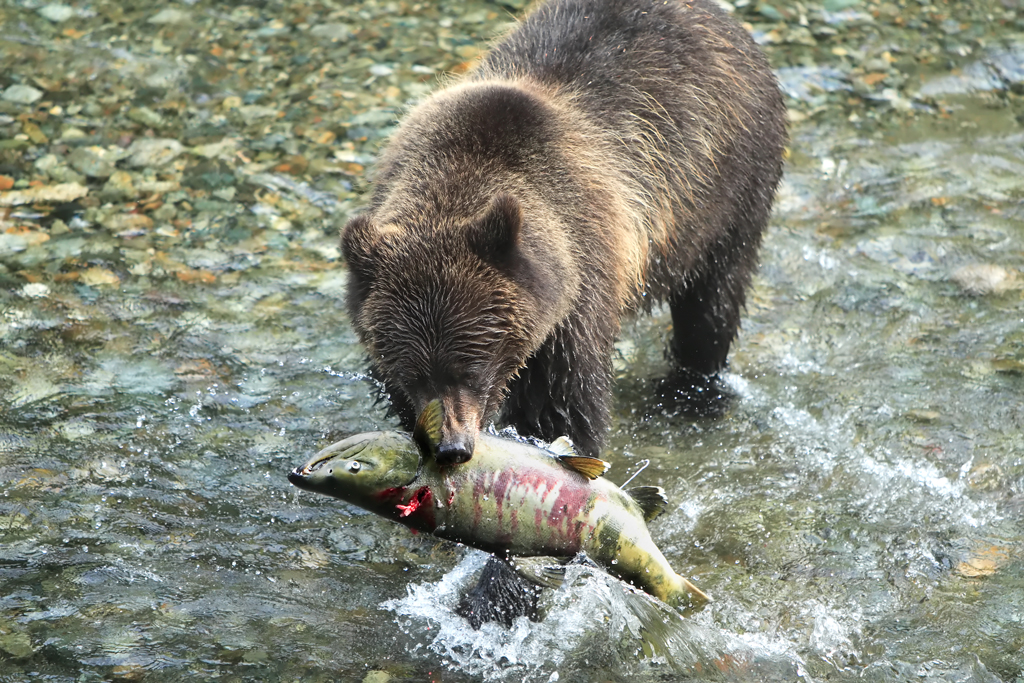
Alaska Peninsula brown bear having caught a chum salmon

Chum salmon have the largest natural range of any Pacific salmon. Chum are found all around the North Pacific, off the coasts of Japan, Korea, the Russian Far East, British Columbia in Canada, and from Alaska to California in the United States. They undergo the longest migrations within the genus Oncorhynchus, far up the Yukon River in Alaska and Canada, and deep into the Amur River basin in Northeast China and Russia. In lesser numbers they migrate thousands of kilometers up the Mackenzie River. In the Arctic Ocean they are found in limited numbers from the Laptev Sea to the Beaufort Sea. In North America chum salmon spawn from the Mackenzie River in the Arctic to as far south as the Umpqua River, Oregon, although they were also reported in the San Lorenzo River near Santa Cruz, California in 1915 and the Sacramento River in northern California in the 1950s. In fall 2017 a half dozen chum salmon were counted in Lagunitas Creek about 25 miles (40 km) north of San Francisco, California.

In the open ocean, chum salmon stay fairly high on the water column, rarely diving below 50 m (160 ft). Their typical swimming depths are 13 m (43 ft) from the surface during the day, and 5 m (16 ft) during the night.

== Commercial use and value ==
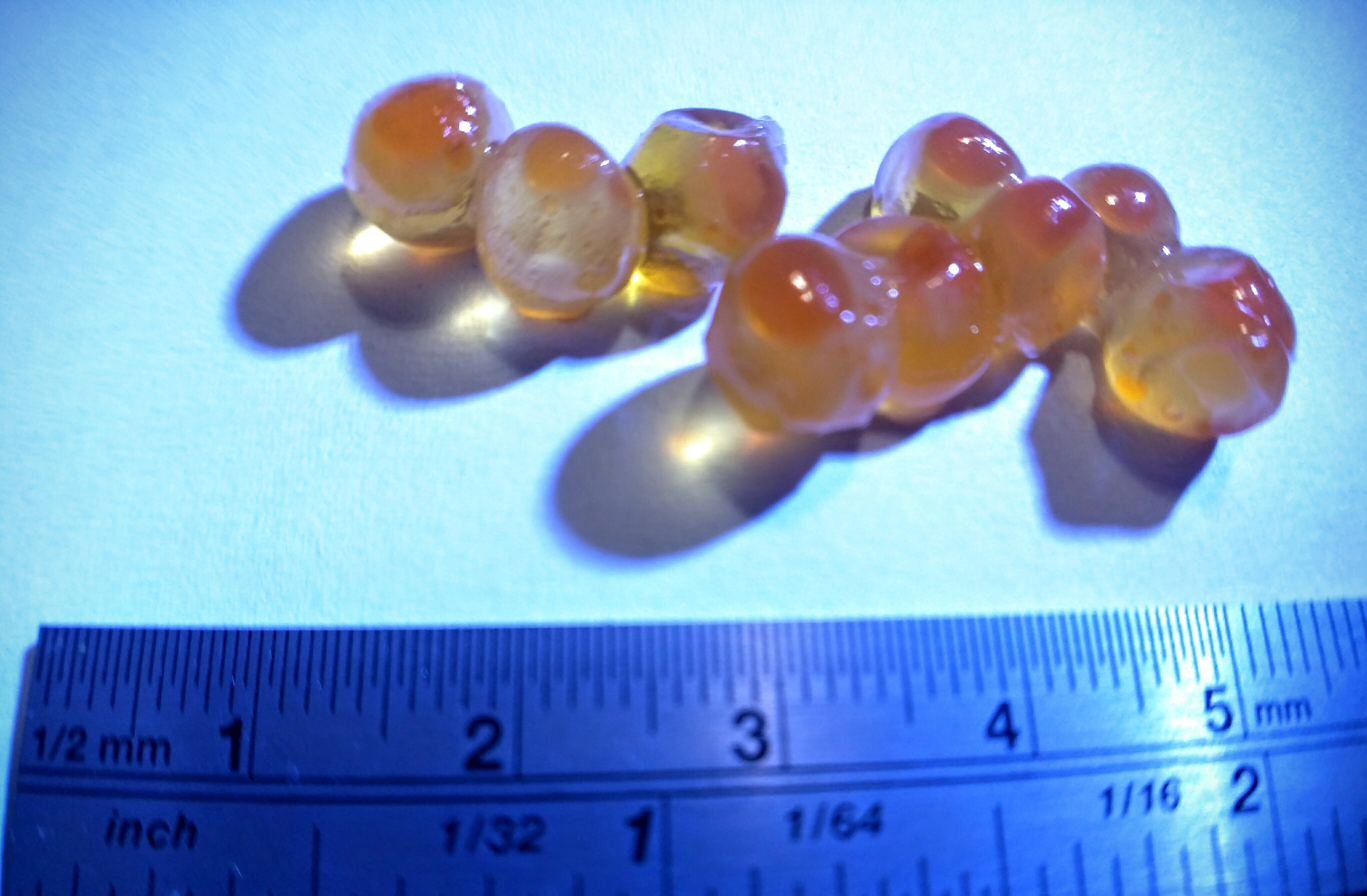
Oncorhynchus keta eggs

Global capture production of Chum salmon (Oncorhynchus keta) in thousand tonnes from 1950 to 2022, as reported by the FAO

The registered total harvest of the chum salmon in the North Pacific in 2010 was some 313,000 tons, corresponding to 91 million fish. Half of the catch was from Japan, and about a quarter each from Russia and the United States. In 2010, the chum salmon harvest was about 34% of the total harvest of all Pacific salmon species by weight. (Note: The numbers do not include fish taken in Russian waters by non-Russian fleet.)

The chum salmon is the least commercially valuable salmon in North America. Despite being extremely plentiful in Alaska, commercial fishers and sport anglers often choose not to target them because of low market value due to the fact that the chum salmon is the least desirable salmon for human consumption. Recent market developments have increased the demand for chum salmon, due to new markets developed from 1984 to 1994 in Japan and Northern Europe. They are a traditional source of dried salmon.

== Conservation ==
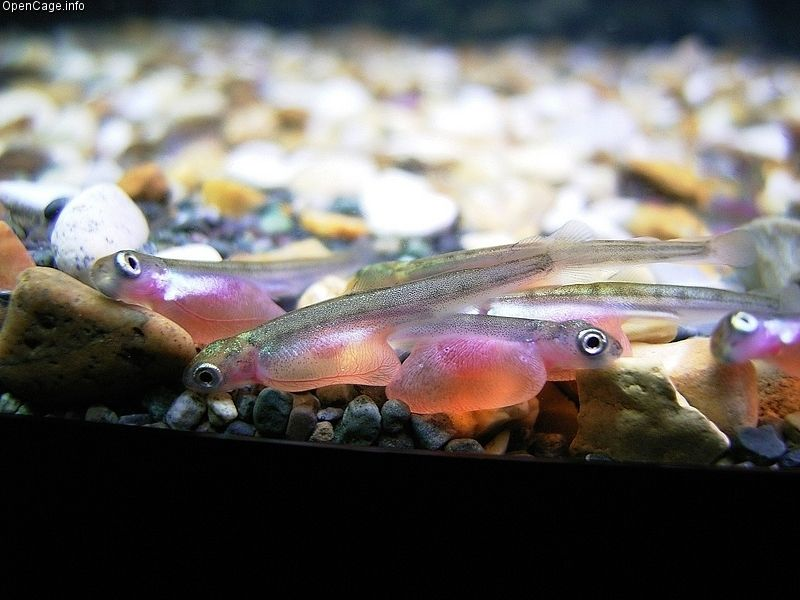
Artificially-incubated chum salmon

Two populations of chum salmon have been listed under the Endangered Species Act as threatened species. These are the Hood Canal Summer Run population and the Lower Columbia River population.

== Susceptibility to diseases ==
Chum are thought to be fairly resistant to whirling disease, but it is unclear.
