= Evermannella melanoderma =

Scientific classification
- Kingdom: Animalia
- Phylum: Chordata
- Class: Actinopterygii
- Order: Aulopiformes
- Family: Evermannellidae
- Genus: Evermannella
- Species: E. melanoderma

Binomial name
- Evermannella melanoderma Parr, 1928

Species of fish

Evermannella melanoderma, the Indian sabertooth fish, is a species of the Evermannelidae family located in tropical and subtropical waters in the Atlantic Ocean. The body composition of E. melanoderma differs from other species, as their eyes are tubular and directed dorsally and slightly anteriorally. The eye diameter is much broader than the interorbital width as well.
