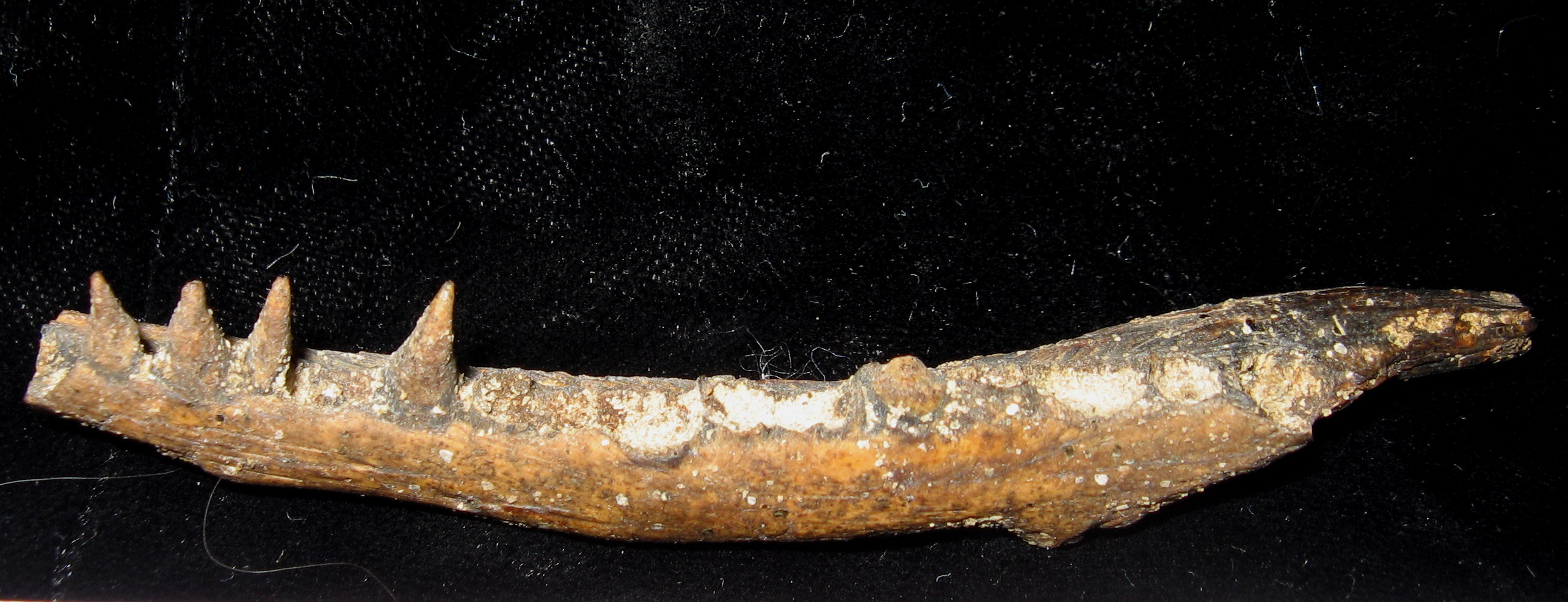
- O. lacustris (jaw). Glenns Ferry Fm., Idaho, USA

Scientific classification
- Kingdom: Animalia
- Phylum: Chordata
- Class: Actinopterygii
- Order: Salmoniformes
- Family: Salmonidae
- Genus: Oncorhynchus
- Species: †O. lacustris

Binomial name
- †Oncorhynchus lacustris (Cope, 1870)

Synonyms
- †Rhabdofario lacustris (Cope, 1870)

= Oncorhynchus lacustris =

Oncorhynchus lacustris Temporal range: late Miocene–Late Pliocene

Extinct species of fish

Oncorhynchus lacustris (syn. Rhabdofario lacustris) is an extinct species of prehistoric freshwater trout from the late Miocene to late Pliocene of Western North America. Its fossils have been found in lacustrine deposits in what is now Idaho.

== See also ==
- Oncorhynchus rastrosus
- Prehistoric fish
- List of prehistoric bony fish
