= Coccorella atlantica =

Scientific classification
- Domain: Eukaryota
- Kingdom: Animalia
- Phylum: Chordata
- Class: Actinopterygii
- Order: Aulopiformes
- Family: Evermannellidae
- Genus: Coccorella
- Species: C. atlantica

Binomial name
- Coccorella atlantica (Parr, 1928)

Species of fish

Coccorella atlantica is a species of sabertooth fish, found in the northeastern part of the Atlantic Ocean. The body composition of C. atlantic differs from other species, as their eyes are semi-tubular and directed dorso-laterally. The eye diameter is about equal to the interorbital width as well.
