= Odontostomops =

Scientific classification
- Kingdom: Animalia
- Phylum: Chordata
- Class: Actinopterygii
- Order: Aulopiformes
- Family: Evermannellidae
- Genus: Odontostomops; Fowler, 1934
- Species: O. normalops

Binomial name
- Odontostomops normalops (A. E. Parr, 1928)

Species of fish

Odontostomops normalops, the undistinguished sabertooth, is a species of sabertooth fish found in the oceanic depth from 400 to 1,000 metres (1,300 to 3,300 ft). This species grows to a length of 12.3 centimetres (4.8 in) SL. This species is the only known member of its genus.
