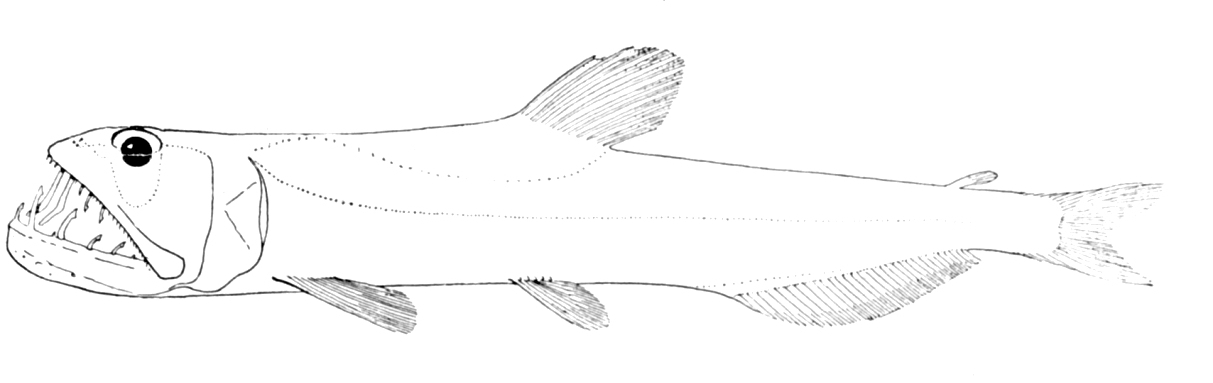
- Evermannella balbo

Scientific classification
- Kingdom: Animalia
- Phylum: Chordata
- Class: Actinopterygii
- Order: Aulopiformes
- Family: Evermannellidae
- Genus: Evermannella; H. W. Fowler, 1901

= Evermannella =

Genus of fishes

Evermannella is a genus of sabertooth fishes.

== Species ==
There are currently five recognized species in this genus:

- Evermannella ahlstromi R. K. Johnson & Glodek, 1975
- Evermannella balbo (A. Risso, 1820) (Balbo sabretooth)
- Evermannella indica A. B. Brauer, 1906
- Evermannella megalops R. K. Johnson & Glodek, 1975
- Evermannella melanoderma A. E. Parr, 1928 (Indian sabertooth)
