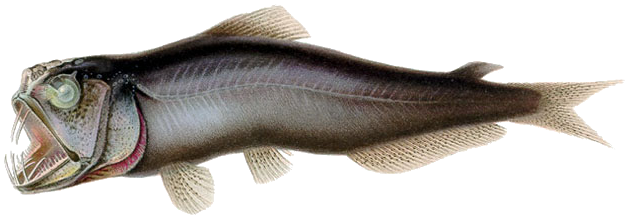
- C. atrata

Scientific classification
- Domain: Eukaryota
- Kingdom: Animalia
- Phylum: Chordata
- Class: Actinopterygii
- Order: Aulopiformes
- Family: Evermannellidae
- Genus: Coccorella; Roule, 1929

= Coccorella =

Genus of fishes

Coccorella is a genus of sabertooth fishes.

== Species ==
There are currently two recognized species in this genus:

- Coccorella atlantica (A. E. Parr, 1928) (Atlantic sabretooth)
- Coccorella atrata (Alcock, 1894)
