= Kype =

Secondary sex characteristic in some fish

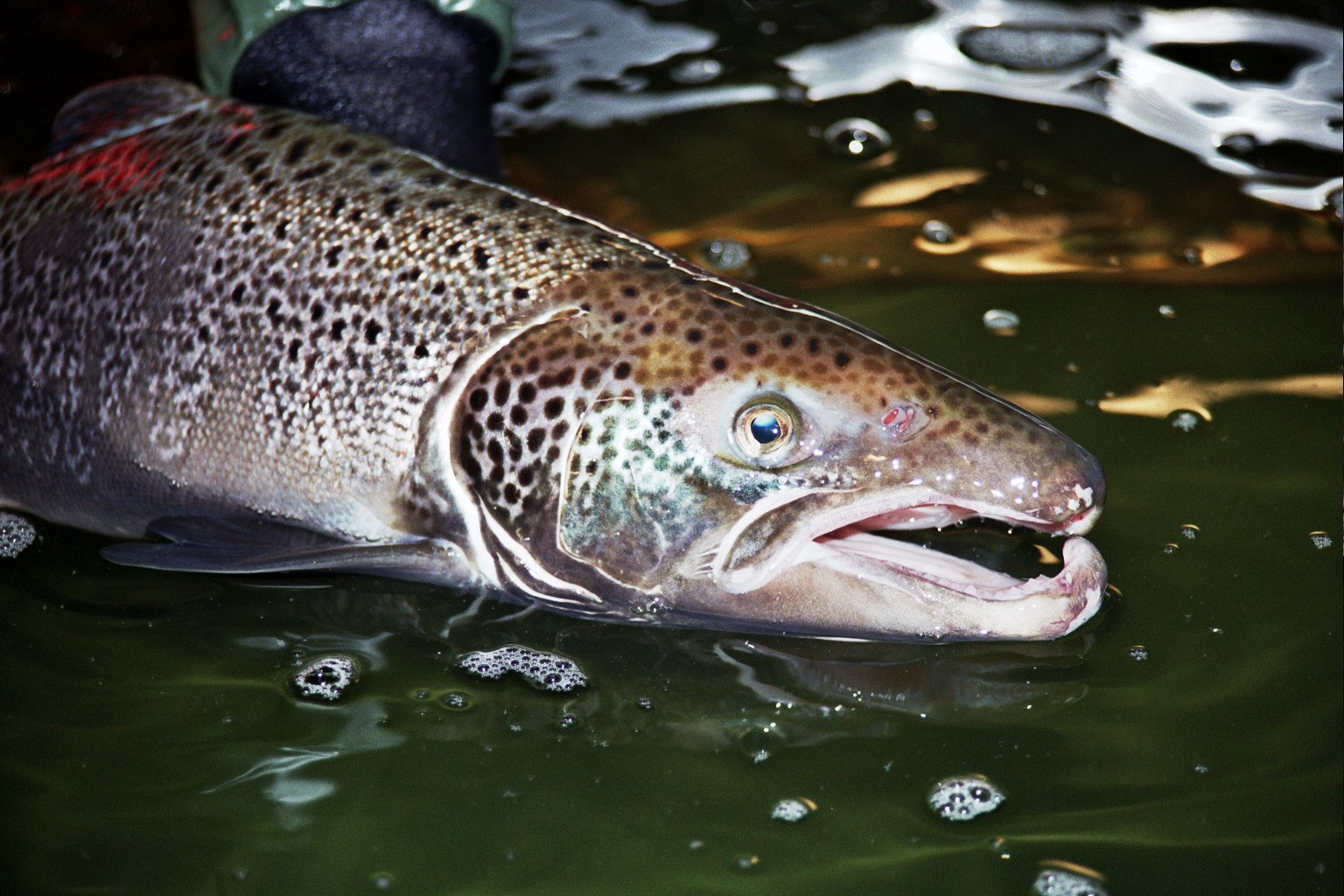
The kype is the hook on the lower jaw which some salmonids develop before the breeding season.

A kype is a hook-like appendage that develops at the distal tip of the lower jaw in some male salmonids prior to the spawning season. The structure usually develops in the weeks prior to, and during, migration to the spawning grounds. In addition to the development of the kype, a large depression forms in the two halves of the premaxilla in the upper jaw, allowing the kype to fit into the premaxilla when the mouth is closed.

The kype functions as a secondary sexual characteristic and influences the formation of dominance hierarchies at the spawning grounds. The size of the kype is believed to determine male spawning frequency.

== Description ==
The kype grows rapidly from bony needles proliferating from the tip of the dentary (the anterior and largest of the bones making up the lower jaw). The needles form a mesh, but do not interfere with the connective tissues used by bone marrow. At the snout, the needles strengthen into Sharpey's fibres. The speed at which the kype skeleton develops results in many osteoblasts and proteoglycans appearing along the growth zone. The dentary itself is made of compact bone, but the kype tissue contains chondrocytes and cartilage. The kype formation process has been described as "making bone as fast as possible and with as little material as possible".

Some species of salmon are semelparous (they have a single reproductive bout before death) whereas others are iteroparous (they spawn multiple times after maturation). In iteroparous cases, at least in Atlantic salmon, the kype is not fully resorbed after the breeding season, although basal parts of the kype skeleton are re-modelled into regular dentary bone. Some fish never lose their kype. Rather, as they re-enter subsequent spawning seasons, their kypes continue to grow. This fast growing skeletal tissue fuses with the dense dentary, becoming a permanent, growing kype.

== Occurrence ==
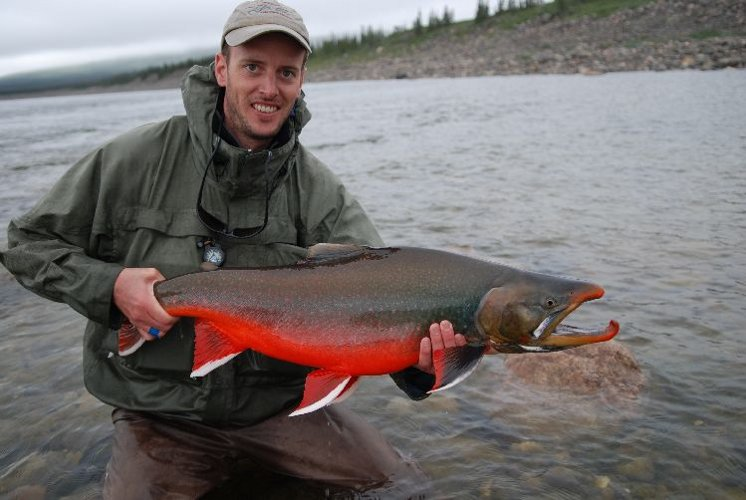
A large male arctic char (Salvelinus alpinus) in spawning condition with a clearly visible kype

Many male trout (e.g. Brown trout (Salmo trutta) and rainbow trout (Oncorhynchus mykiss)) and salmon develop a kype prior to spawning periods. In pre-spawning Salmo and Salvelinus males, the lower jaw elongates and the hook develops; female salmon do not develop a kype. Bull trout (Salvelinus confluentus) are adfluvial (adults spawn in streams but subadults and adults migrate to lakes for feeding) and sometimes develop a kype, however, although this may occur in some populations, it remains absent in others.

Among American species of charr, the kype reaches its maximum size in the large anadromous males, Dolly Varden trout (Salvelinus malma) and brook trout (Salvelinus fontinalis), whereas it is reportedly absent or hardly visible in large nonanadromous males, Arctic char (Salvelinus alpinus) and lake trout (Salvelinus namaycush).

=== Similar structural changes ===
In salmonids of the genus Oncorhynchus (meaning "hooked snout"), the upper jaw becomes more elongated than the lower thereby forming a "snout". In some species, the development of the "kype" (in this study defined as the distance from the middle of eye to the tip of the snout) is used as an indicator of a difference in behavioural mating strategies. Chinook salmon (Oncorhynchus tshawytscha) express one of two fixed alternative reproductive tactics. Individuals expressing these are referred to as "hooknose" or "jack". Hooknose males leave their natal rivers at the end of their first year of life, but then return after maturing for 3 to 5 years on average. Once returned, they fight for position in a dominance hierarchy to gain closer access to spawning females. Alternatively, jacks are presumably resident in their natal rivers their entire lives, reach sexual maturity precociously (after 2 years), and use a sneaking tactic, by darting from nearby refuges to steal fertilisations from hooknose males.

== Associated seasonal changes ==
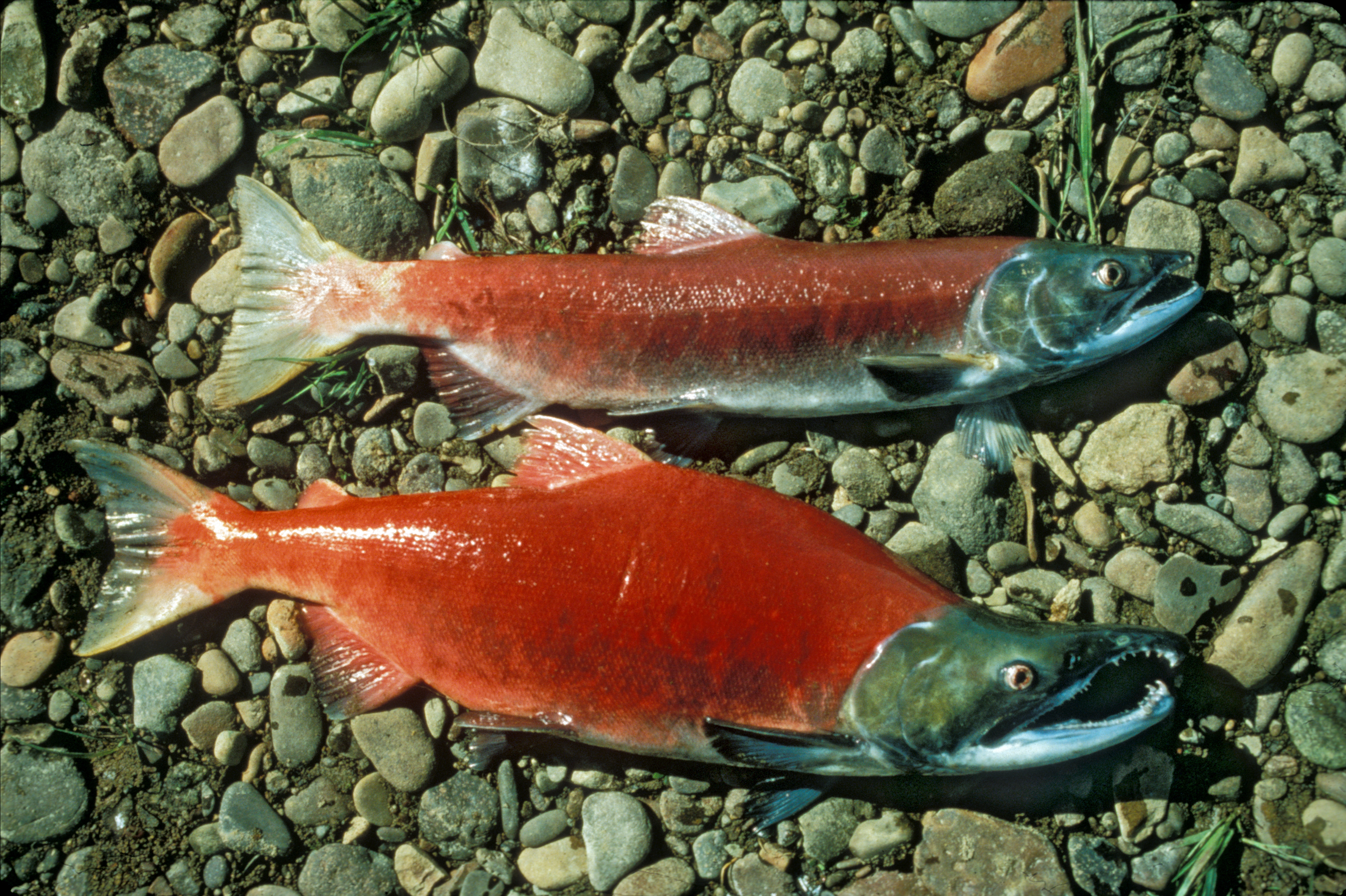
Sockeye salmon (Oncorhynchus nerka) Female (above) and male in mating condition. Note that the male has a kype, enlarged snout, humped back and deeper, more extensive colouration.

Development of the kype often occurs in association with other seasonal changes. In the Atlantic salmon (Salmo salar), kype development is accompanied by a morphogenesis of bones and cartilages in the ethmoidal zone (the anterior region of the skull) changing the appearance of both jaws, the appearance of "breeding teeth" and resorption of scales (more so in males than females). Some salmonids may develop a predominant hump under their dorsal fin.

== Function ==
Charles Darwin considered the kype to be a product of sexual selection and as a tool for fighting among males. For example, male salmon have been seen in the wild using their kype to firmly grasp an opponent's tail. Others have suggested it has no function, and observed the kype seems to prevent the use of the breeding teeth which sometimes develop alongside the kype. One suggestion was that the kype is merely the result of a surplus of chemicals, not used for the production of sex products.

Today, the kype is regarded as a secondary sex characteristic displayed by males at the spawning grounds. Therefore, its function is considered to be helping the fish establish a hierarchy among other males where those with larger kypes are dominant over animals with smaller kypes, and/or characteristics that could be of importance in inter- and intra-sexual evaluations of individual quality. The size of the kype is believed to determine male spawning frequency.

== In extinct salmon ==
The extinct sabertooth salmon, Oncorhynchus rastrosus, was first named for its prominent premaxillary dentition. It possessed an enormous conical tooth on each premaxilla. There is no visible kype on the dentary, implying a different strategy for forming mate dominance.

== Gallery ==
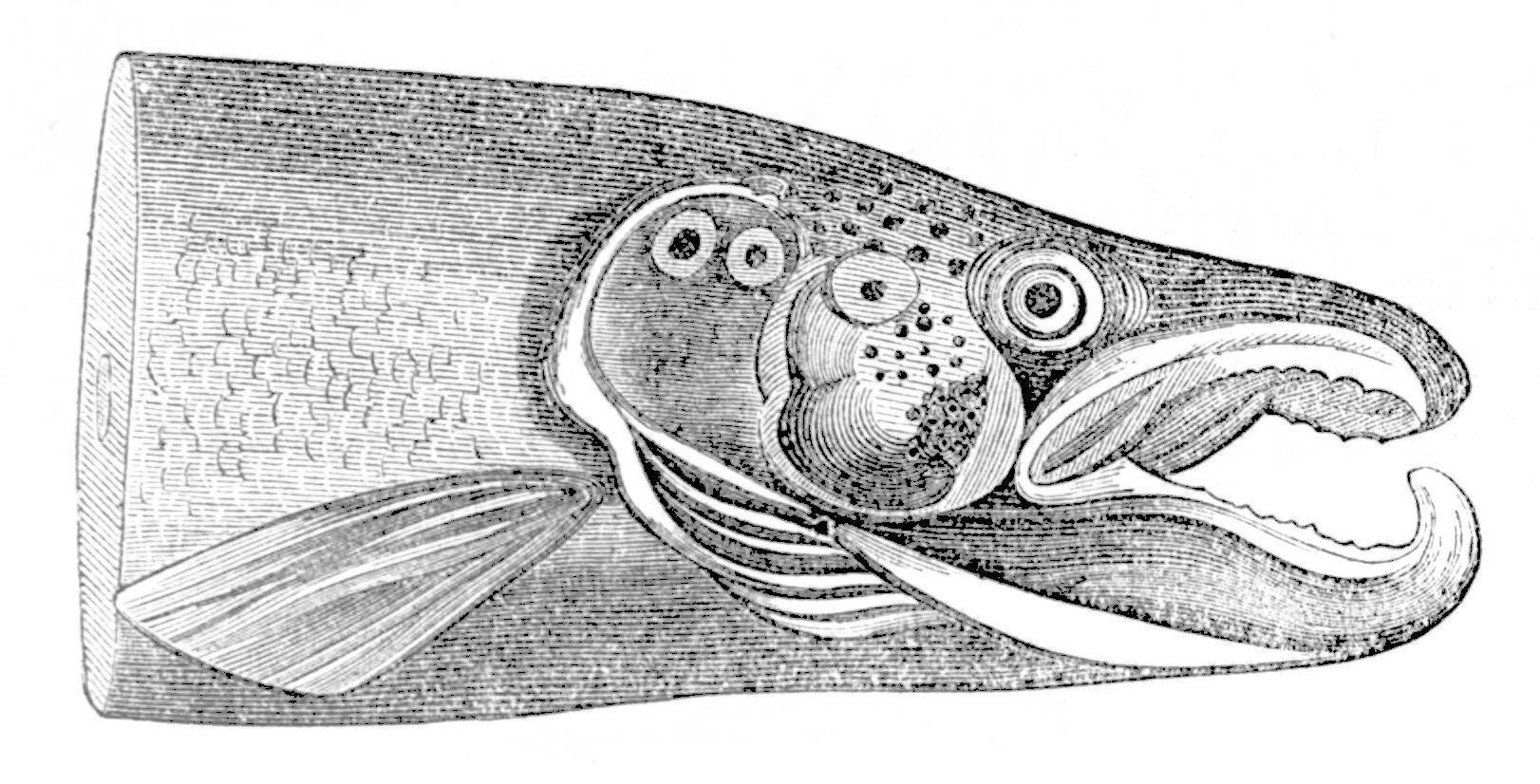

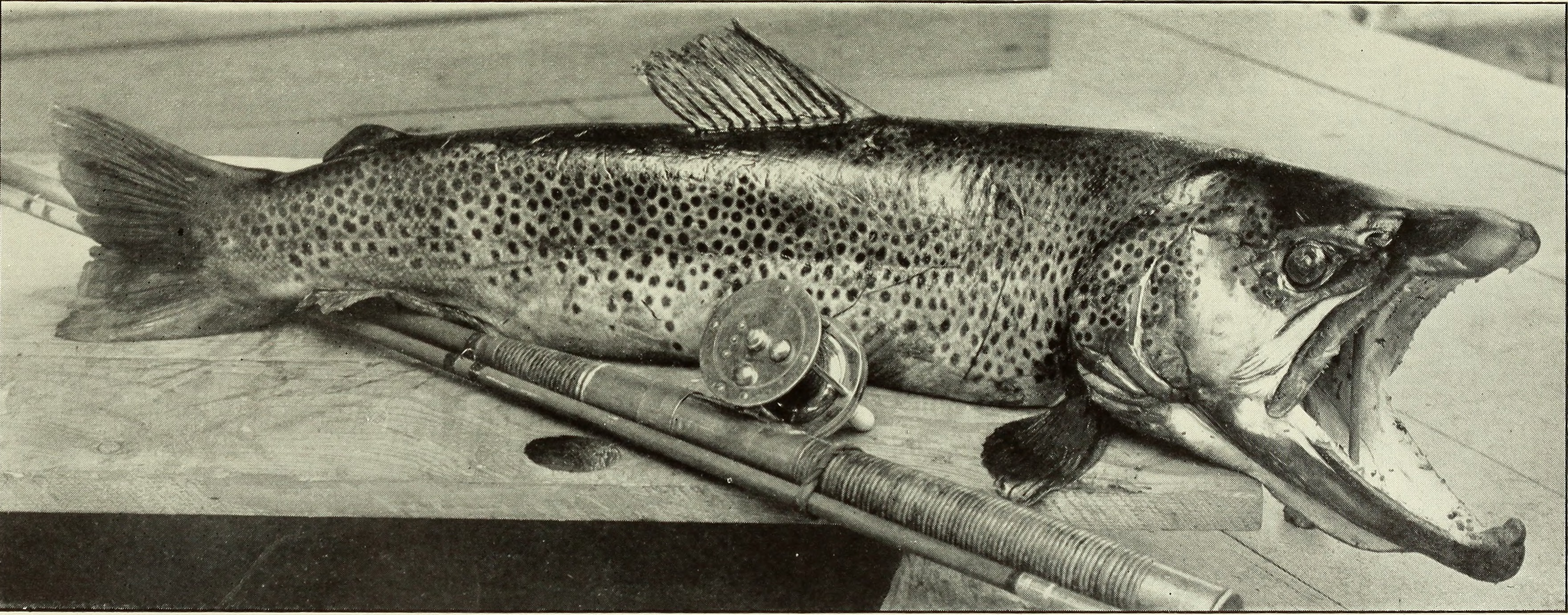

== See also ==
- Salmon run
