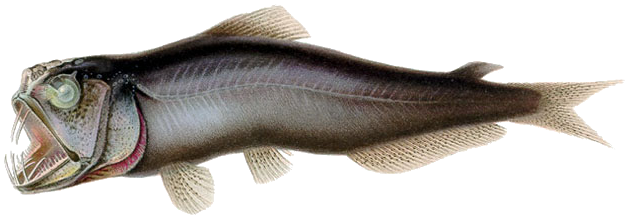
- C. atrata

Conservation status
- Least Concern (IUCN 3.1)

Scientific classification
- Kingdom: Animalia
- Phylum: Chordata
- Class: Actinopterygii
- Order: Aulopiformes
- Family: Evermannellidae
- Genus: Coccorella
- Species: C. atrata

Binomial name
- Coccorella atrata (Alcock, 1894)

= Coccorella atrata =

Species of fish

Coccorella atrata is a species of sabertooth fish. It is a deepwater species found at depths of 300–2,626 m in the Indian and Pacific oceans.
