= Johann Julius Walbaum =

German physician, naturalist and taxonomist (1724–1799)

Johann Walbaum
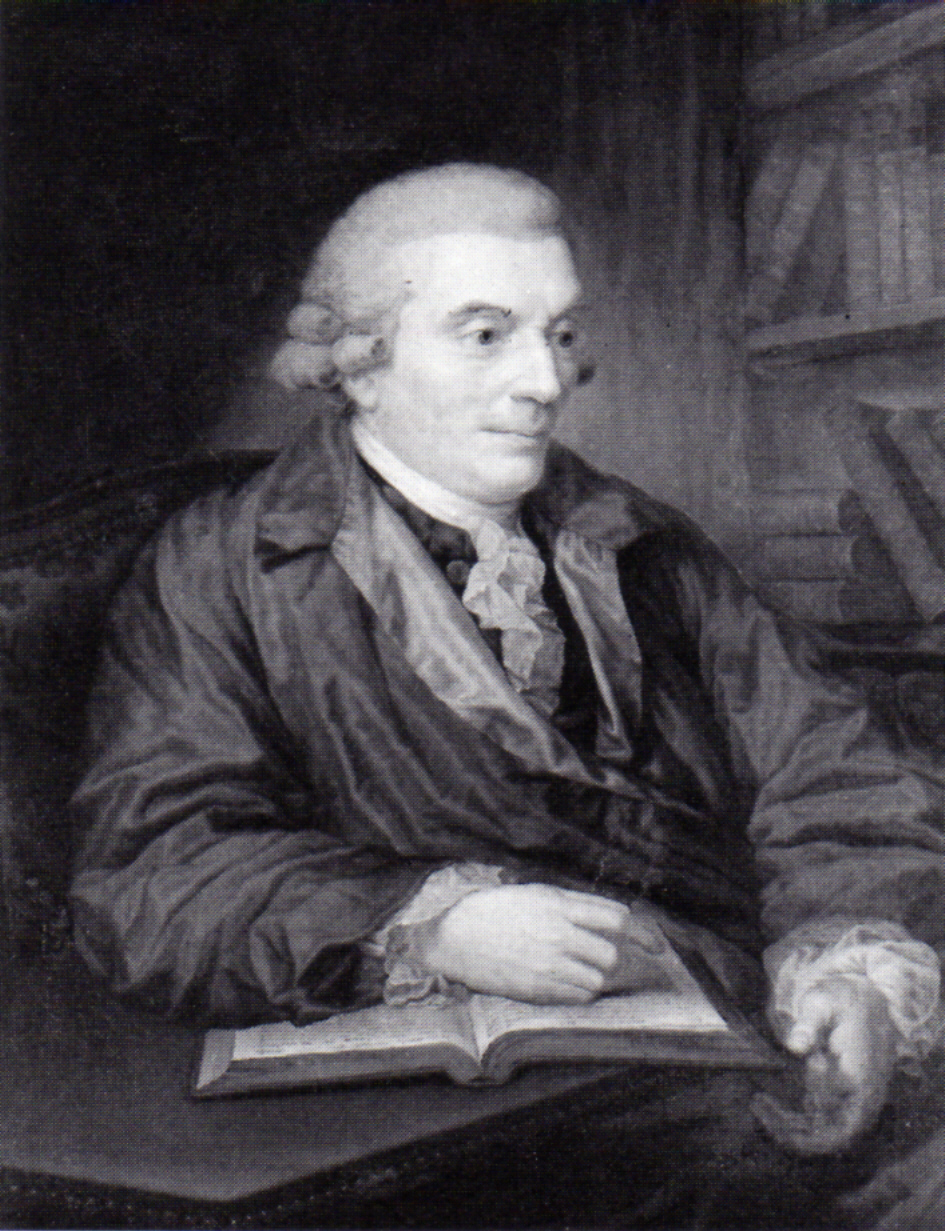
- Johann Julius Walbaum
- Born: 30 June 1724; Wolfenbüttel
- Died: 21 August 1799 (aged 75); Lübeck
- Occupation: German naturalist

Johann Julius Walbaum (30 June 1724 – 21 August 1799) was a German physician, naturalist and fauna taxonomist.

== Works ==
Walbaum was from Greifswald. As an ichthyologist, he was the first to describe many previously unknown fish species from remote parts of the globe, such as the Great Barracuda (Sphyraena barracuda), the Chum salmon (Oncorhynchus keta) from the Kamchatka River in Siberia, and the curimatá-pacú (Prochilodus marggravii) from the São Francisco River in Brazil.

Walbaum was one of the first to observe gloves as a preventative against infection in medical surgery. As early as 1767, he used gloves made from sheep intestines for vaginal exams.

== Legacy ==
The Natural History Museum in Lübeck, opened in 1893, was based on Walbaum's extensive scientific collection. The museum's collection was, however, destroyed during the Bombing of Lübeck.

== See also ==
- Taxa named by Johann Julius Walbaum
