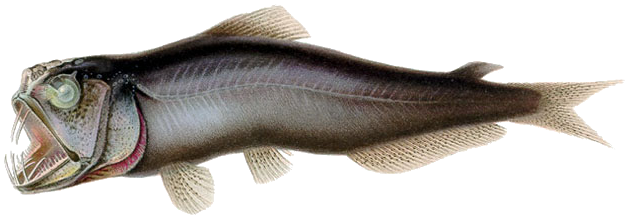
- Coccorella atrata

Scientific classification
- Kingdom: Animalia
- Phylum: Chordata
- Class: Actinopterygii
- Order: Aulopiformes
- Family: Evermannellidae; Fowler, 1901

Genera
- Coccorella; Evermannella; Odontostomops

= Sabertooth fish =

Sabertooth fishes

Family of fishes

Sabertooth or sabretooth fish are small, deep-sea aulopiform fish comprising the family Evermannellidae. The family is small, with just eight species in three genera represented; they are distributed throughout tropical to subtropical waters of the Atlantic, Indian, and Pacific Oceans.

These fishes are named for their oversized, recurved palatine teeth, similar to those of saber-toothed cats (and the prehistoric Enchodus). The family is named Evermannellidae after Barton Warren Evermann, noted ichthyologist, naturalist and director of the California Academy of Sciences.

== Description ==
Sabertooth fishes have moderately elongated and compressed bodies which lack normal scales. The head is large and blunt; the terminal mouth is large and lined with slender palatine teeth, and the front is mostly enlarged and is curved inward slightly. A number of shorter, straighter teeth accompany these fang-like teeth. The tongue is toothless.

The eyes of the Odontostomops normalops typically range in size from small to large with a tubular structure while pointing upwards and directly laterally. The Atlantic sabertooth (Cocorella atlantica) have semi-tubular eyes directed dorso-laterally while the Balbo sabertooth (Evermannella balbo) and Indian sabertooth (Evermannella melanoderma) have tubular eyes but directed dorsally and slightly anteriorly. The tubular nature of these eyes allow the sabertooth fish to extend their vision in specific directions, and also are presumed to aid with depth perception in the dark. Evermannella have an additional adaptation called the optical fold. These optical folds are found on the lateral sides of the eyes and are another adaptation that allow these fish to extend their field of vision. The presumed mechanism of these optical folds is by altering the angle of the light from the lateral and ventral sides to better enter the eye.

Similarly, in O. normalops, the horizontal diameter of the eye is significantly smaller than the width of the orbit, whereas in C. atlantica, the diameter of the eye is approximately equal to the interorbital width. In the case of E. balbo and E. melanoderma, the horizontal diameter of the eye is notably wider than the interorbital width. These observations suggest that there exist significant variations in the proportional dimensions of the eyes and orbits among different species of organisms, which may be indicative of distinct anatomical and functional adaptations.

The anal fin (26–37 rays) is the largest of the fins, and runs along the posterior half of the fish, tapering in height towards the emarginated caudal fin. For O. normalops, anal fin ray counts are lowest in the Atlantic, higher in the Indian Ocean, and highest in the Pacific. Further sampling must be done in order to determine a cause for this trend and if this trend exists in other species as well. A single high dorsal fin (10–13 rays) originates slightly before the thoracic pelvic fins. A small adipose fin is also present. The pectoral fins (11–13 rays) are positioned rather low on the body. All fins are spineless and lightly pigmented in shades of brown.

The different families have 44–54 vertebrae, with three discrete bands of muscle tissue (epaxial, mid-lateral, and hypaxial) present in the caudal region. Sabertooths do not have swim bladders, and the stomach is highly distensible.

Evermannella are aulopiforms that have fusiform body structures, resulting in the fish being more deep anteriorly. This is in contrast to the elongated bodies of most other aulopiforms.

Sabertooth fish are usually a drab, light to dark brown when preserved; however, a brassy green iridescence is seen on the flanks, cheeks, and ocular region of well-preserved specimens. The naked skin is easily torn. The Atlantic sabertooth (Coccorella Atlantica) is the largest species, at up to 18.5 cm standard length.

== Life history ==
Almost nothing is known of the biology and ecology of evermannellids. They are active, visual predators and confine themselves to the mesopelagic zone, about 400m - 1000m for adults. However, larvae and small juvenile sabertooth fishes tend to be found at depth ranges between 50m - 100m, descending to deeper water with age. At these depths, extremely little light is available; the view from below is like the sky at twilight. The sabertooth fish use their telescopic, upward-pointing eyes— which are thus adapted for improved terminal vision at the expense of lateral vision— to pick out squid, cuttlefish, and smaller fish silhouetted against the gloom above them.

Their distensible stomachs allow sabertooth fishes to swallow prey larger than themselves; their recurved teeth likely function in a manner similar to a snake's, preventing a captured fish from backing out and helping to guide the fish down the sabertooth's pharynx. Sabertooth fishes are solitary animals; it is not known whether they undergo diel vertical migrations.

Their reproductive habits are poorly studied; they are assumed to be nonguarding, pelagic spawners. True synchronous hermaphroditism with external fertilization is known in Evermannella indica and Odontostomops normalops, and the former species appears to spawn throughout the year. Sabertooth fish larvae are planktonic and have long snouts and oblong eyes before metamorphosis.

== See also ==
- Saber-toothed salmon

== Sources ==
- Froese, Rainer; Pauly, Daniel (eds.). "Family Evermannellidae". FishBase. April 2012 version.
- Fishes: An introduction to ichthyology. Peter B. Moyle and Joseph J. Cech, Jr; p. 336. Printed in 2004. Prentice-Hall, Inc; Upper Saddle River, NJ. ISBN 0-13-100847-1
- Arronte, J. C.; Bañón, R.; Sánchez, F.; Serrano, A. (2012-03-05). "On the occurrence of Odontostomops normalops (Aulopiformes: Evermannellidae) in the Bay of Biscay (north-eastern Atlantic)". Journal of Applied Ichthyology. 28 (4): 649–651. doi:10.1111/j.1439-0426.2012.01951.x. ISSN 0175-8659.
- Maile, A. J., May, Z. A., DeArmon, E. S., Martin, R. P., & Davis, M. P. (2020). Marine habitat transitions and body-shape evolution in lizardfishes and their allies (Aulopiformes). Copeia, 108(4), 820–832.
- Wagner, H. -J.; Fröhlich, E.; Negishi, K.; Collin, S. P. (1998-10-01). "The eyes of deep-sea fish II. Functional morphology of the retina". Progress in Retinal and Eye Research. 17 (4): 637–685. doi:10.1016/S1350-9462(98)00003-2. ISSN 1350-9462.
- Nelson, Joseph S., et al. Fishes of the World. Wiley, 2016
