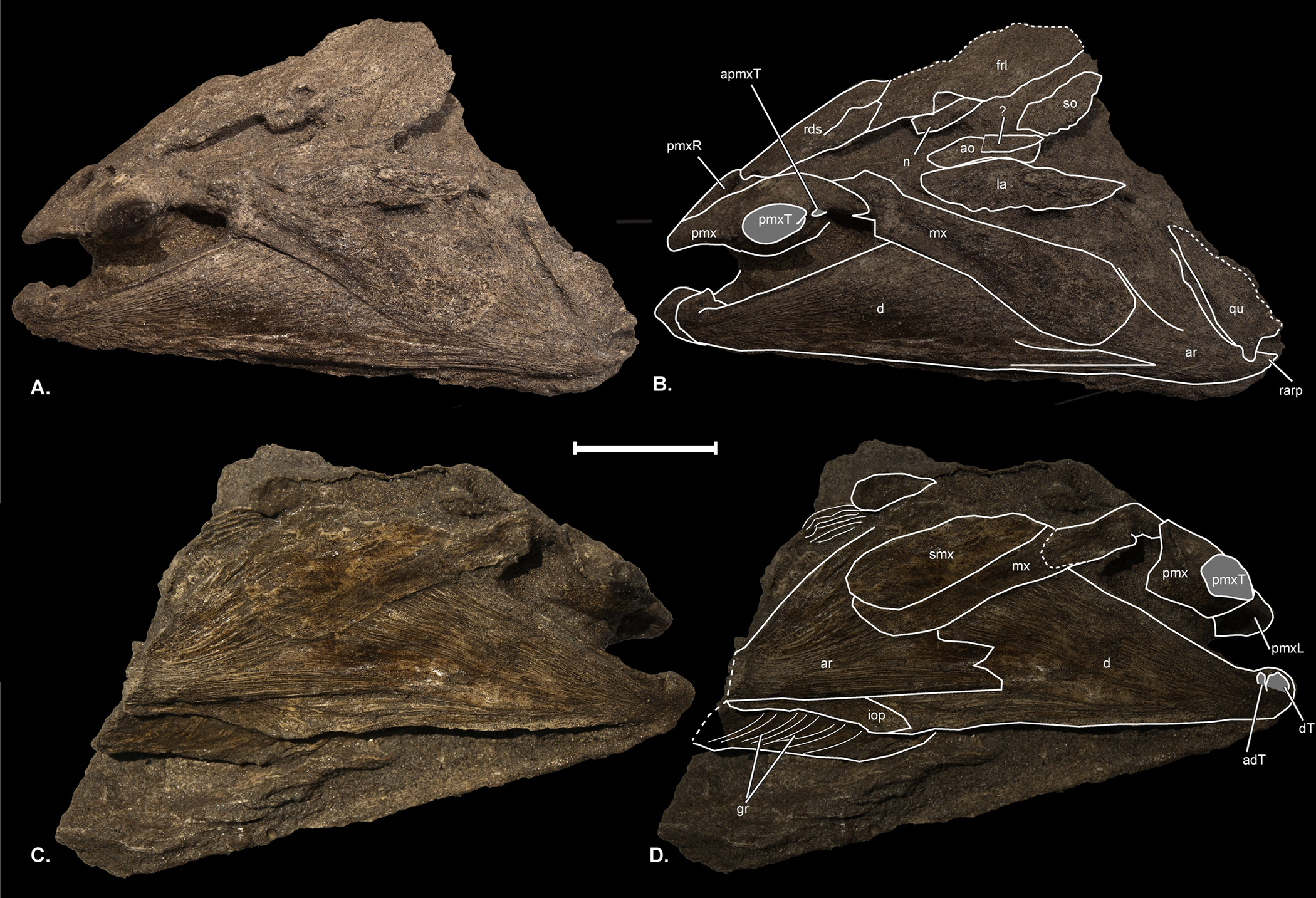
- Skull of female specimen (UO F-55101)
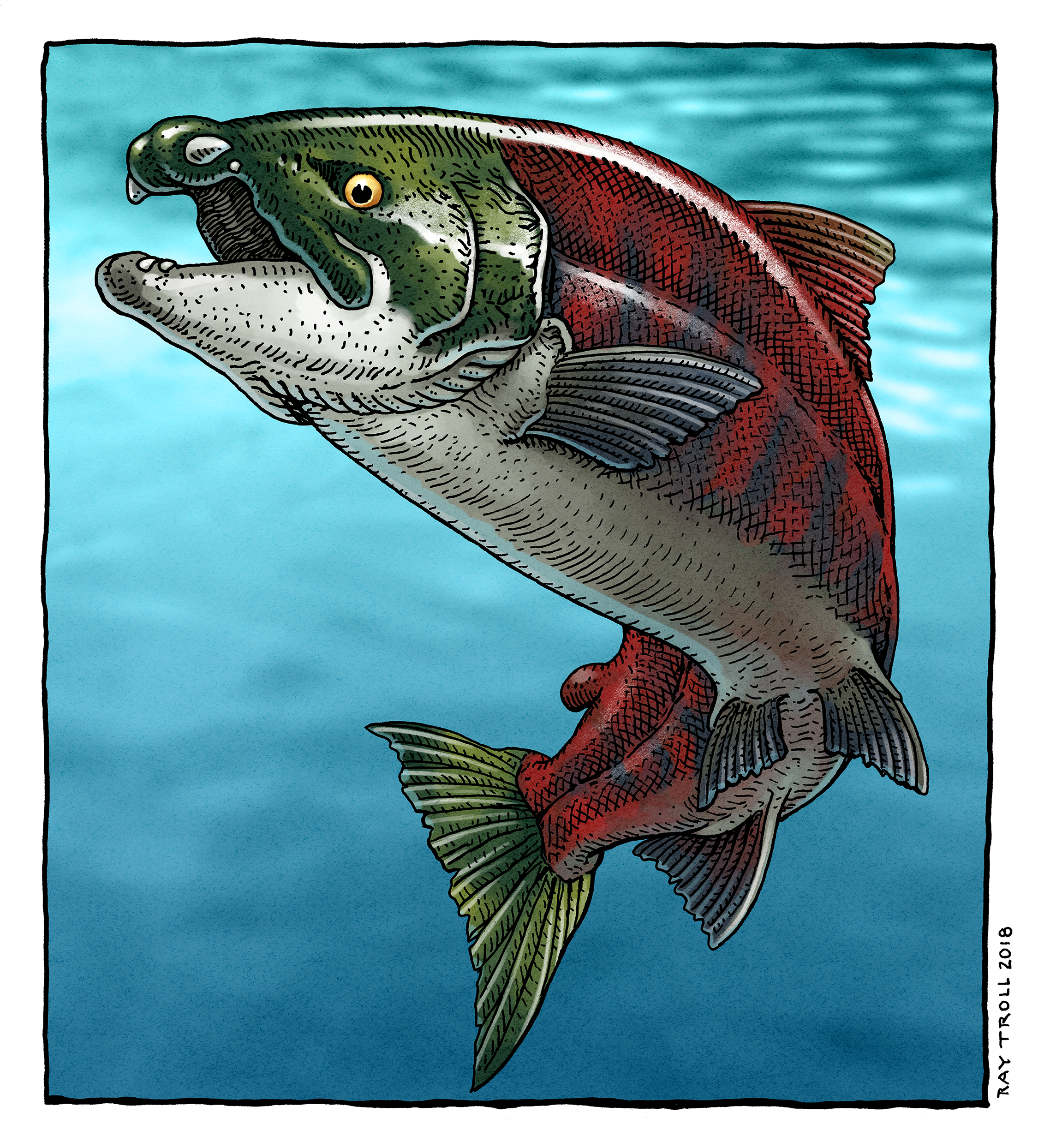
- Reconstruction by Ray Troll

Scientific classification
- Kingdom: Animalia
- Phylum: Chordata
- Class: Actinopterygii
- Division: Teleostei
- Order: Salmoniformes
- Family: Salmonidae
- Genus: Oncorhynchus
- Species: †O. rastrosus

Binomial name
- †Oncorhynchus rastrosus (Cavender & Miller, 1972)

Synonyms
- Smilodonichthys rastrosus

= Oncorhynchus rastrosus =

Oncorhynchus rastrosus Temporal range: Clarendonian-Hemphillian, 12–5 Ma

Extinct prehistoric salmon

Oncorhynchus rastrosus (originally described as Smilodonichthys rastrosus), also known as the saber-toothed salmon (now known to be a misnomer) or spike-toothed salmon, is an extinct species of salmon that lived along the Pacific coast of North America and Japan. They first appeared in the late Miocene in California, then died out some time during the Early Pliocene. They are members of the genus Oncorhynchus, which contains living pacific salmon.

O. rastrosus was possibly the largest member of the family Salmonidae, rivalling or exceeding the largest living salmonid Hucho taimen in size, with estimates varying from standard length (without tail fin) of 1.9 m (6 ft 3 in) and 177 kg (390 lb) to total length of 2.4–2.7 m (7 ft 10 in – 8 ft 10 in) and 200 kg (440 lb).

Members of this species had a pair of small "fangs" protruding from the tip of the snout, thus explaining the common name and synonym. Adults of O. rastrosus had larger gill rakers compared to their smaller, modern relatives, leading scientists to suggest that the adults ate plankton. These salmon are believed to have been anadromous like their living relatives.

Scientists once thought the teeth pointed straight down, like a saber-toothed cat's teeth. Now it is believed the teeth stuck out sideways from the mouth. The salmon's spike teeth grew in size as it transitioned from life in the ocean to fresh water. The salmon bred in fresh water, as Pacific salmon do today. Tooth wear patterns suggest the salmon used its teeth to defend territory and mark nests during the breeding phase.

The species was first described in 1972 from remains found in the Madras Formation near Gateway in Jefferson County, Central Oregon. Other specimens have been described from other parts of Oregon as well as California, as well as central Japan. Additional material subsequently collected from the Gateway locality has included articulated skull material.
