= Animal navigation =

Ability of many animals to find their way accurately without maps or instruments

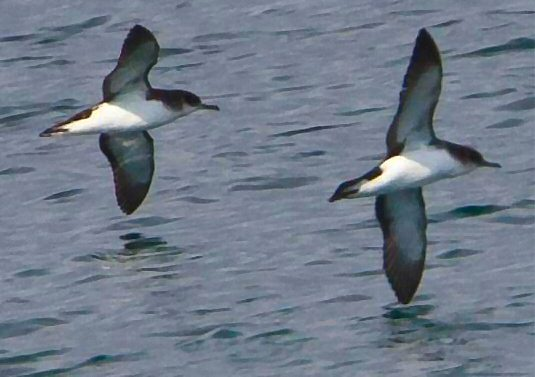
Manx shearwaters can fly straight home when released, navigating thousands of miles over land or sea.

Animal navigation is the ability of many animals to find their way accurately without maps or instruments. Birds such as the Arctic tern, insects such as the monarch butterfly and fish such as the salmon regularly migrate thousands of miles to and from their breeding grounds, and many other species navigate effectively over shorter distances.

Dead reckoning, navigating from a known position using only information about one's own speed and direction, was suggested by Charles Darwin in 1873 as a possible mechanism. In the 20th century, Karl von Frisch showed that honey bees can navigate by the Sun, by the polarization pattern of the blue sky, and by the Earth's magnetic field; of these, they rely on the Sun when possible. William Tinsley Keeton showed that homing pigeons could similarly make use of a range of navigational cues, including the Sun, Earth's magnetic field, olfaction and vision. Ronald Lockley demonstrated that a small seabird, the Manx shearwater, could orient itself and fly home at full speed, when released far from home, provided either the Sun or the stars were visible.

Several species of animal can integrate cues of different types to orient themselves and navigate effectively. Insects and birds are able to combine learned landmarks with sensed direction (from the Earth's magnetic field or from the sky) to identify where they are and so to navigate. Internal 'maps' are often formed using vision, but other senses including olfaction and echolocation may also be used.

The ability of wild animals to navigate may be adversely affected by products of human activity. For example, there is evidence that pesticides may interfere with bee navigation, and that lights may harm turtle navigation.

== Early research ==
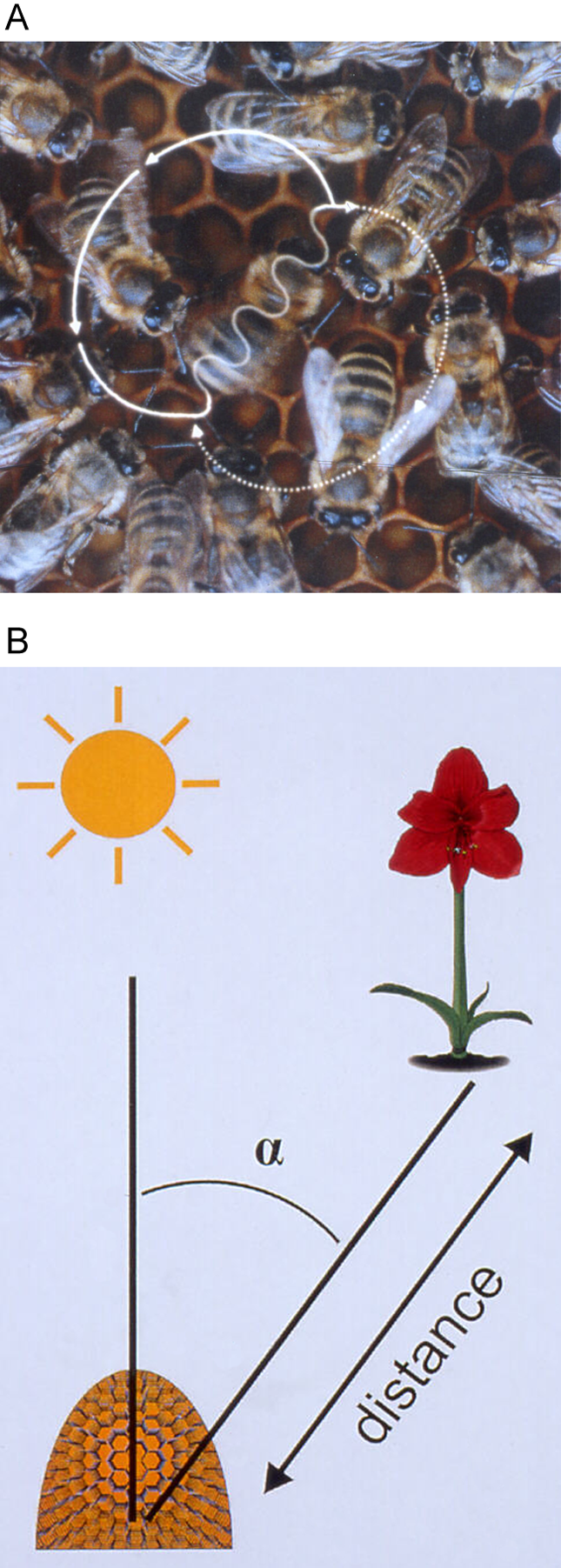
Karl von Frisch (1953) discovered that honey bee workers can navigate, and indicate the range and direction to food to other workers with a waggle dance.

In 1873, Charles Darwin wrote a letter to Nature magazine, arguing that animals including man have the ability to navigate by dead reckoning, even if a magnetic 'compass' sense and the ability to navigate by the stars is present:

With regard to the question of the means by which animals find their way home from a long distance, a striking account, in relation to man, will be found in the English translation of the Expedition to North Siberia, by Von Wrangell. (Note: The book was A Journey on the Northern Coast of Siberia and the Icy Sea (2 vols.), London, 1841. Wrangel is variously spelt Vrangel or Wrangell.) He there describes the wonderful manner in which the natives kept a true course towards a particular spot, whilst passing for a long distance through hummocky ice, with incessant changes of direction, and with no guide in the heavens or on the frozen sea. He states (but I quote only from memory of many years standing) that he, an experienced surveyor, and using a compass, failed to do that which these savages easily effected. Yet no one will suppose that they possessed any special sense which is quite absent in us. We must bear in mind that neither a compass, nor the north star, nor any other such sign, suffices to guide a man to a particular spot through an intricate country, or through hummocky ice, when many deviations from a straight course are inevitable, unless the deviations are allowed for, or a sort of "dead reckoning" is kept. All men are able to do this in a greater or less degree, and the natives of Siberia apparently to a wonderful extent, though probably in an unconscious manner. This is effected chiefly, no doubt, by eyesight, but partly, perhaps, by the sense of muscular movement, in the same manner as a man with his eyes blinded can proceed (and some men much better than others) for a short distance in a nearly straight line, or turn at right angles, or back again. The manner in which the sense of direction is sometimes suddenly disarranged in very old and feeble persons, and the feeling of strong distress which, as I know, has been experienced by persons when they have suddenly found out that they have been proceeding in a wholly unexpected and wrong direction, leads to the suspicion that some part of the brain is specialised for the function of direction.

Later in 1873, Joseph John Murphy (Note: JJ Murphy (d 1894), of County Antrim, was treasurer and then president of the Belfast Literary Society. He attempted to harmonise evolution and religion, publishing a book The Scientific Bases of Faith in 1872.) replied to Darwin, writing back to Nature with a description of how he, Murphy, believed animals carried out dead reckoning, by what is now called inertial navigation:

If a ball is freely suspended from the roof of a railway carriage it will receive a shock sufficient to move it, when the carriage is set in motion: and the magnitude and direction of the shock … will depend on the magnitude and direction of the force with which the carriage begins to move … [and so] … every change in … the motion of the carriage … will give a shock of corresponding magnitude and direction to the ball. Now, it is conceivably quite possible, though such delicacy of mechanism is not to be hoped for, that a machine should be constructed … for registering the magnitude and direction of all these shocks, with the time at which each occurred … from these data the position of the carriage … might be calculated at any moment.

Karl von Frisch (1886–1982) studied the European honey bee, demonstrating that bees can recognize a desired compass direction in three different ways: by the Sun, by the polarization pattern of the blue sky, and by the Earth's magnetic field. He showed that the Sun is the preferred or main compass; the other mechanisms are used under cloudy skies or inside a dark beehive.

William Tinsley Keeton (1933–1980) studied homing pigeons, showing that they were able to navigate using the Earth's magnetic field, the Sun, as well as both olfactory and visual cues.

Donald Griffin (1915–2003) studied echolocation in bats, demonstrating that it was possible and that bats used this mechanism to detect and track prey, and to "see" and thus navigate through the world around them.

Ronald Lockley (1903–2000), among many studies of birds in over fifty books, pioneered the science of bird migration. He made a twelve-year study of shearwaters such as the Manx shearwater, living on the remote island of Skokholm. These small seabirds make one of the longest migrations of any bird—10,000 kilometres—but return to the exact nesting burrow on Skokholm year after year. This behaviour led to the question of how they navigated.

== Mechanisms ==
Lockley began his book Animal Navigation with the words:

How do animals find their way over apparently trackless country, through pathless forests, across empty deserts, over and under featureless seas? ... They do so, of course, without any visible compass, sextant, chronometer or chart...

Many mechanisms of spatial cognition have been proposed for animal navigation: there is evidence for a number of them. Investigators have often been forced to discard the simplest hypotheses - for example, some animals can navigate on a dark and cloudy night, when neither landmarks nor celestial cues like Sun, Moon, or stars are visible. The major mechanisms known or hypothesized are described in turn below.

=== Remembered landmarks ===
Animals including mammals, birds and insects such as bees and wasps (Ammophila and Sphex), are capable of learning landmarks in their environment, and of using these in navigation.

Yellowjacket wasps using a stone as a landmark to navigate to their nest entrance. When the stone moved, they continued for a time to return orienting with the stone.

=== Orientation by the Sun ===
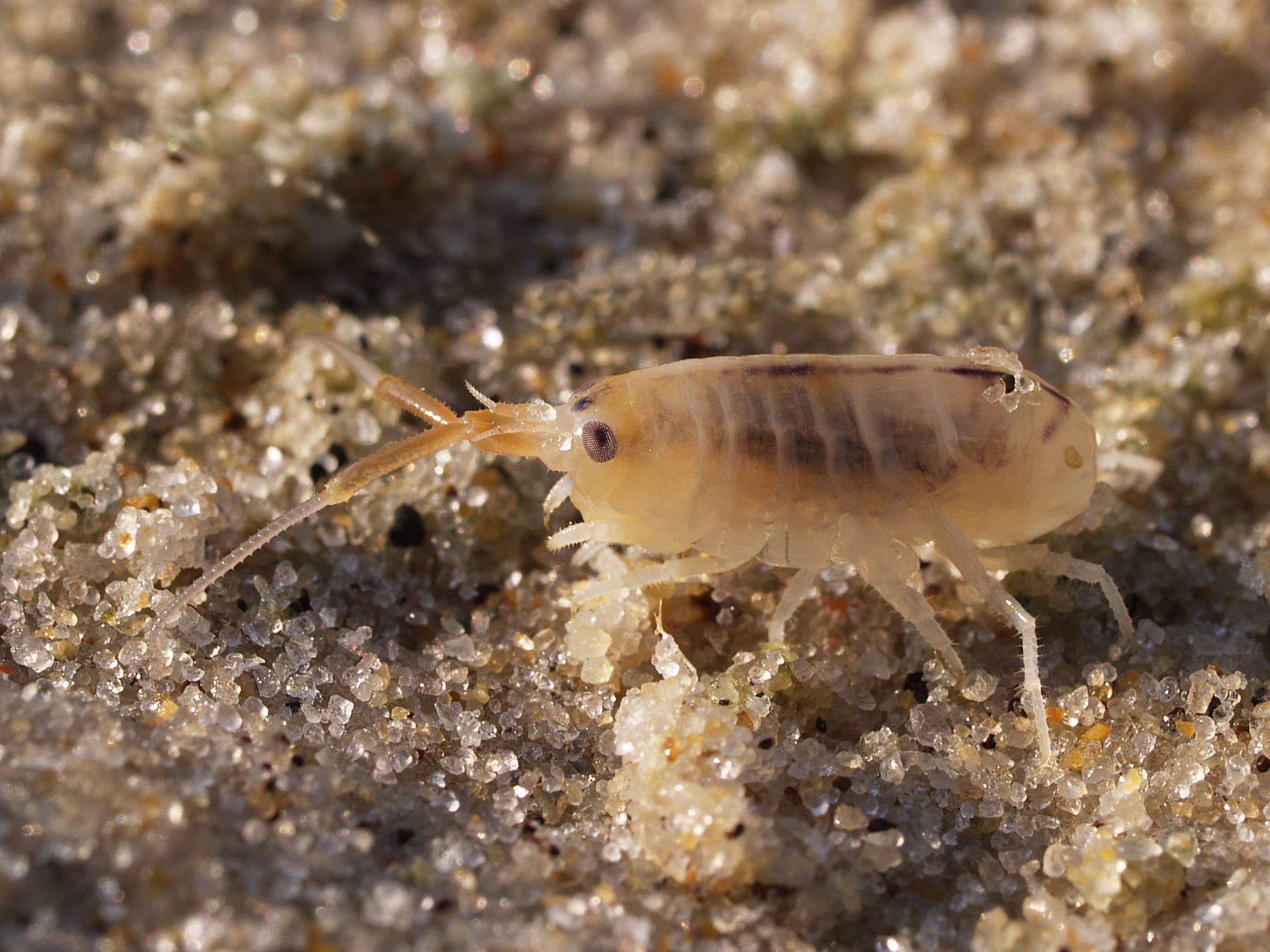
The sandhopper, Talitrus saltator, uses the Sun and its internal clock to determine direction.

Some animals can navigate using celestial cues such as the position of the Sun. Since the Sun moves in the sky, navigation by this means also requires an internal clock. Many animals depend on such a clock to maintain their circadian rhythm. Animals that use sun compass orientation are fish, birds, sea-turtles, butterflies, bees, sandhoppers, reptiles, and ants.

When sandhoppers (such as Talitrus saltator) are taken up a beach, they easily find their way back down to the sea. It has been shown that this is not simply by moving downhill or towards the sight or sound of the sea. A group of sandhoppers were acclimatised to a day/night cycle under artificial lighting, whose timing was gradually changed until it was 12 hours out of phase with the natural cycle. Then, the sandhoppers were placed on the beach in natural sunlight. They moved away from the sea, up the beach. The experiment implied that the sandhoppers use the sun and their internal clock to determine their heading, and that they had learnt the actual direction down to the sea on their particular beach.

Experiments with Manx shearwaters showed that when released "under a clear sky" far from their nests, the seabirds first oriented themselves and then flew off in the correct direction. But if the sky was overcast at the time of release, the shearwaters flew around in circles.

Monarch butterflies use the Sun as a compass to guide their southwesterly autumn migration from Canada to Mexico.

=== Orientation by the night sky ===
In a pioneering experiment, Lockley showed that warblers placed in a planetarium showing the night sky oriented themselves towards the south; when the planetarium sky was then very slowly rotated, the birds maintained their orientation with respect to the displayed stars. Lockley observes that to navigate by the stars, birds would need both a "sextant and chronometer": a built-in ability to read patterns of stars and to navigate by them, which also requires an accurate time-of-day clock.

In 2003, the African dung beetle Scarabaeus zambesianus was shown to navigate using polarization patterns in moonlight, making it the first animal known to use polarized moonlight for orientation. (Note: A diagram of the experimental apparatus is available from JEB.) In 2013, it was shown that dung beetles can navigate when only the Milky Way or clusters of bright stars are visible, making dung beetles the only insects known to orient themselves by the galaxy.

=== Orientation by polarised light ===
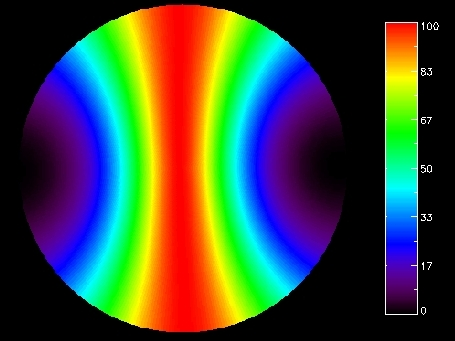
Rayleigh sky model shows how polarization of light can indicate direction to bees.

Some animals, notably insects such as the honey bee, are sensitive to the polarisation of light. Honey bees can use polarized light on overcast days to estimate the position of the Sun in the sky, relative to the compass direction they intend to travel. Karl von Frisch's work established that bees can accurately identify the direction and range from the hive to a food source (typically a patch of nectar-bearing flowers). A worker bee returns to the hive and signals to other workers the range and direction relative to the Sun of the food source by means of a waggle dance. The observing bees are then able to locate the food by flying the implied distance in the given direction, though other biologists have questioned whether they necessarily do so, or are simply stimulated to go and search for food. However, bees are certainly able to remember the location of food, and to navigate back to it accurately, whether the weather is sunny (in which case navigation may be by the Sun or remembered visual landmarks) or largely overcast (when polarised light may be used).

=== Magnetoreception ===
The homing pigeon can quickly return to its home, using cues such as the Earth's magnetic field to orient itself.

Some animals, including mammals such as blind mole rats (Spalax) and birds such as pigeons, are sensitive to the Earth's magnetic field.

Homing pigeons use magnetic field information with other navigational cues. Pioneering researcher William Keeton showed that time-shifted homing pigeons could not orient themselves correctly on a clear sunny day, but could do so on an overcast day, suggesting that the birds prefer to rely on the direction of the Sun, but switch to using a magnetic field cue when the Sun is not visible. This was confirmed by experiments with magnets: the pigeons could not orient correctly on an overcast day when the magnetic field was disrupted.

=== Olfaction ===
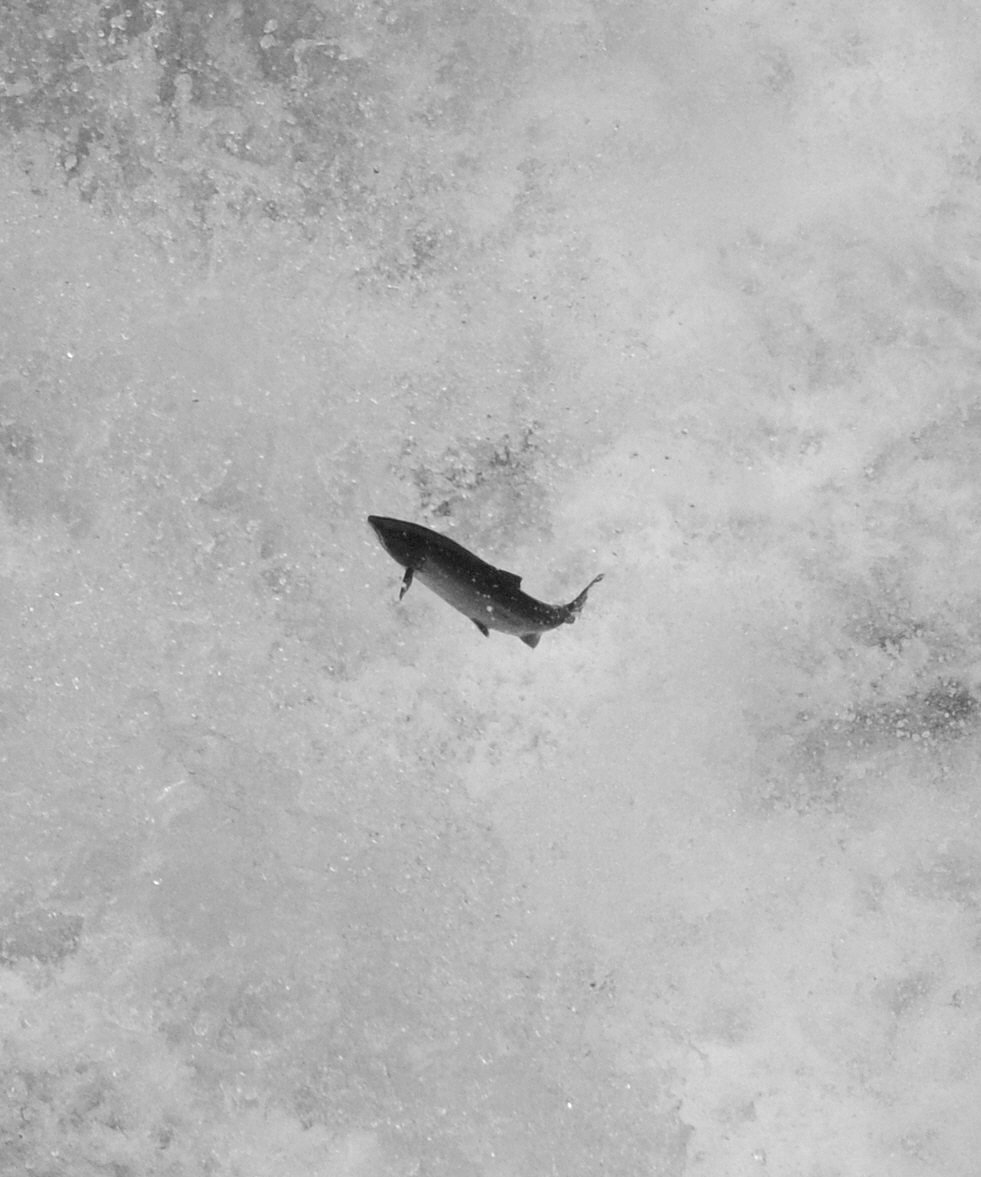
Returning salmon may use olfaction to identify the river in which they developed.

Olfactory navigation has been suggested as a possible mechanism in pigeons. Papi's 'mosaic' model argues that pigeons build and remember a mental map of the odours in their area, recognizing where they are by the local odour. Wallraff's 'gradient' model argues that there is a steady, large-scale gradient of odour which remains stable for long periods. If there were two or more such gradients in different directions, pigeons could locate themselves in two dimensions by the intensities of the odours. However it is not clear that such stable gradients exist. Papi did find evidence that anosmic pigeons (unable to detect odours) were much less able to orient and navigate than normal pigeons, so olfaction does seem to be important in pigeon navigation. However, it is not clear how olfactory cues are used.

Olfactory cues may be important in salmon, which are known to return to the exact river where they hatched. Lockley reports experimental evidence that fish such as minnows can accurately tell the difference between the waters of different rivers. Salmon may use their magnetic sense to navigate to within reach of their river, and then use olfaction to identify the river at close range.

=== Gravity receptors ===
GPS tracing studies indicate that gravity anomalies could play a role in homing pigeon navigation.

=== Other senses ===
Biologists have considered other senses that may contribute to animal navigation. Many marine animals such as seals are capable of hydrodynamic reception, enabling them to track and catch prey such as fish by sensing the disturbances their passage leaves behind in the water. Marine mammals such as dolphins, and many species of bat, are capable of echolocation, which they use both for detecting prey and for orientation by sensing their environment.

=== Way-marking ===
The wood mouse is the first non-human animal to be observed, both in the wild and under laboratory conditions, using movable landmarks to navigate. While foraging, they pick up and distribute visually conspicuous objects, such as leaves and twigs, which they then use as landmarks during exploration, moving the markers when the area has been explored.

== Path integration ==
Path integration sums the vectors of distance and direction travelled from a start point to estimate current position, and so the path back to the start.

Dead reckoning, in animals usually known as path integration, means the putting together of cues from different sensory sources within the body, without reference to visual or other external landmarks, to estimate position relative to a known starting point continuously while travelling on a path that is not necessarily straight. Seen as a problem in geometry, the task is to compute the vector to a starting point by adding the vectors for each leg of the journey from that point.

Since Darwin's On the Origins of Certain Instincts (quoted above) in 1873, path integration has been shown to be important to navigation in animals including ants, rodents and birds. When vision (and hence the use of remembered landmarks) is not available, such as when animals are navigating on a cloudy night, in the open ocean, or in relatively featureless areas such as sandy deserts, path integration must rely on idiothetic cues from within the body.

Studies by Wehner in the Sahara desert ant (Cataglyphis bicolor) demonstrate effective path integration to determine directional heading (by polarized light or sun position) and to compute distance (by monitoring leg movement or optical flow).

Path integration in mammals makes use of the vestibular organs, which detect accelerations in the three dimensions, together with motor efference, where the motor system tells the rest of the brain which movements were commanded, and optic flow, where the visual system signals how fast the visual world moves past the eyes. Information from other senses such as echolocation and magnetoreception may also be integrated in certain animals. The hippocampus is the part of the brain that integrates linear and angular motion to encode a mammal's relative position in space.

David Redish states that "The carefully controlled experiments of Mittelstaedt and Mittelstaedt (1980) and Etienne (1987) have demonstrated conclusively that [path integration in mammals] is a consequence of integrating internal cues from vestibular signals and motor efferent copy".

== Effects of human activity ==
Neonicotinoid pesticides may impair the ability of bees to navigate. Bees exposed to low levels of thiamethoxam were less likely to return to their colony, to an extent sufficient to compromise a colony's survival.

Light pollution attracts and disorients photophilic animals, those that follow light. For example, hatchling sea turtles follow bright light, particularly bluish light, altering their navigation. Disrupted navigation in moths can easily be observed around bright lamps on summer nights. Insects gather around these lamps at high densities instead of navigating naturally.

== See also ==
- Animal migration
- Salmon run

== Sources ==
- Lockley, Ronald M. (1967). Animal Navigation. Pan Books.
- Lockley, Ronald M. (1942). Shearwaters. J. M. Dent.
- Redish, A. David (1999). Beyond the Cognitive Map (PDF). MIT Press.
- Tinbergen, Nico (1984). Curious Naturalists (Revised ed.). University of Massachusetts Press.
- von Frisch, Karl (1953). The Dancing Bees. Harcourt, Brace & World.
