= Natal homing =

Tendency of many animals to return to their birthplace to reproduce

Natal homing, or natal philopatry, is the homing process by which some adult animals that have migrated away from their juvenile habitats return to their birthplace to reproduce. This process is primarily used by aquatic animals such as sea turtles and salmon, although some migratory birds and mammals also practice similar reproductive behaviors. Scientists believe that the main cues used by the animals are geomagnetic imprinting and olfactory cues. The benefits of returning to the precise location of an animal's birth may be largely associated with its safety and suitability as a breeding ground. When seabirds like the Atlantic puffin return to their natal breeding colony, which are mostly on islands, they are assured of a suitable climate and a sufficient lack of land-based predators.

Sea turtles born in any one area differ genetically from turtles born in other areas. The newly hatched young head out to sea and soon find suitable feeding grounds, and it has been shown that it is to these feeding areas that they return rather than to the actual beach on which they started life. Salmon start their lives in freshwater streams and eventually travel down-river and are washed out to sea. Their ability to travel back, several years later, to the river system in which they were spawned is thought to be linked to olfactory cues, the "taste" of the water. Atlantic bluefin tuna spawn on both the east and west shores of the Atlantic Ocean but intermingle as they feed in mid-ocean. Juvenile tuna that have been tagged have clearly shown that they almost invariably return to the side of the Atlantic on which they were spawned.

Various theories have been put forward as to how the animals find their way home. The geomagnetic imprinting hypothesis holds that they are imprinted with the unique magnetic field that exists in their natal area. This is a plausible theory but has not been proven to occur. Pacific salmon are known to be imprinted on the water chemistry of their home river, a fact that has been confirmed experimentally. They may use geomagnetic information to get close to the coast and then pick up the olfactory cues. Some animals may make navigational errors and end up in the wrong location. If they successfully breed in these new sites, the animal will have widened its breeding base which may ultimately increase the species' chances of survival. Other, unknown means of navigation may be involved, and further research is needed.

== Sea turtles ==
There are several different kinds of marine animals that demonstrate natal homing. The most commonly known is the sea turtle. Loggerhead sea turtles are thought to show two different types of homing. The first of which comes in the early stages of life. When first heading out to sea, the animals are carried out by tides and currents with little swimming involved. Recent studies now show that the animals demonstrate homing to feeding grounds near their natal birthplace.

Turtles of a specific natal beach show differences in their mitochondrial DNA haplotypes that distinguish them from turtles of other nesting areas. Many turtles from the same beaches show up at the same feeding areas. Once reaching sexual maturity in the Atlantic Oceans, the female loggerhead makes the long trip back to her natal beach to lay her eggs. The loggerhead sea turtle in the North Atlantic cover more than 9,000 miles round trip to lay eggs on the North American shore.

== Salmon ==
The migration of North Pacific Salmon from the ocean to their freshwater spawning habitat is one of the most extreme migrations in the animal kingdom. The life cycle of a salmon begins in a freshwater stream or river that dumps into the ocean. After spending four or five years in the ocean and reaching sexual maturity, many salmon return to the same streams they were born in to spawn. There are several hypotheses on how salmon are able to do this.

One hypothesis is that they use both chemical and geomagnetic cues that allow them to return to their birthplace. The Earth's magnetic field may help the fish navigate the ocean to find the spawning region. From there, the animal locates where the river dumps into the sea with the chemical cues unique to the fish's natal stream.

Other hypotheses rely on the fact that salmon have an extremely strong sense of smell. One hypothesis states that salmon retain an imprint of the odor of their natal stream as they are migrating downstream. Using this memory of the odor, they are able to return to the same stream years later. Another smell-related hypothesis states that the young salmon release a pheromone as they migrate downstream, and are able to return the same stream years later by smelling the pheromone they released.

== Bluefin tuna ==
Atlantic bluefin tuna spawn on both the east and west shores of the Atlantic Ocean. When a bluefin tuna hatches, there is a chemical imprint in the animal's otoliths based on the water's chemical properties. Fish born in different regions will show clear differences here. Studies of the commercial fishing industry in the United States show that the population of bluefin tuna in the North Atlantic is made up of fish hailing from both coasts. While the fish may live in close proximity out in the Atlantic, they return to their natal region to spawn. Electronic tagging done over several years showed that 95.8 percent of the yearlings tagged in the Mediterranean Sea returned there to spawn. Results for the Gulf of Mexico were 99.3 percent. With the overfishing of this species, scientists have much to learn about their spawning habits in order to sustain the population for both a reliable food source and a healthy ecosystem.

== Atlantic puffins ==
Atlantic puffins spend the winter at sea and then return to the places of their birth, as has been shown by ringing birds. The breeding sites are usually inhospitable clifftops and uninhabited islands. Birds that were removed as chicks and released elsewhere were found to show fidelity to their point of liberation rather than to their birthplace.

== Navigational tools ==
=== Geomagnetic imprinting ===
One idea about how animals accomplish natal homing is that they imprint on the unique magnetic field that exists in their natal area and then use this information to return years later. This idea is known as the "geomagnetic imprinting hypothesis" The concept was developed in a 2008 paper that sought to explain how sea turtles and salmon can return to their home areas after migrating hundreds or thousands of kilometers away

In animal behavior, the term "imprinting" refers to a special type of learning. Exact definitions of imprinting vary, but important aspects of the process include the following: (1) the learning occurs during a particular, critical period, usually early in the life of the animal; (2) the effects last a long time; and (3) the effects cannot be easily modified. For natal homing, the concept is that animals like sea turtles and salmon imprint on the magnetic field of their home area when young, and then use this information to return years later.

Geomagnetic imprinting has not been proven to occur, but it appears to be plausible for several reasons. The earth's magnetic field varies across the globe in such a way that different geographic areas have different magnetic fields associated with them. Also, sea turtles have a well-developed magnetic sense and can detect both the intensity (strength) of the Earth's field as well as the inclination angle (angle at which the field lines intersect the earth's surface). Thus, it is plausible that sea turtles, and maybe salmon also, can recognize their home areas using the distinctive magnetic fields that exist there.

=== Chemical cues and olfactory imprinting ===
Pacific salmon are known to imprint on the chemical signature of their home river. This information helps salmon find their home river once they reach the coast from the open sea. In most cases, chemical cues from rivers are not thought to extend very far out into the ocean. Thus, salmon probably use two different navigational systems in sequence when they migrate from the open sea to their spawning grounds. The first one, possibly based on the earth's magnetic field (see Geomagnetic Imprinting above), is used in the open ocean and probably brings salmon close to their home river. Once they are close to the home river, salmon can use olfactory (chemical) signals to find their spawning area.

Many of the classical studies demonstrating olfactory imprinting in salmon were carried out by Arthur Hasler and his colleagues. In one particularly famous experiment, young salmon were imprinted with artificial chemicals and were released into the wild to perform their normal migrations. Almost all of the young fish returned to the same stream that had also been artificially imprinted with the same chemicals, proving that the fish do use chemical cues to return to their natal region.

== Effect of thermal pollution on natal homing ==
Thermal pollution, which refers to the degradation of water quality by changing the ambient water temperature, has a serious effect on natal homing of chum salmon. Chum salmon are cold water fish that prefer water around 10 °C (50 °F). When water temperature is raised due to thermal pollution, chum salmon tend to dive into deep water for thermoregulation. This reduces the time chum salmon spend in the surface water column and reduces the chance for chum salmon to approach the natal river, since the chemical cue for natal homing is concentrated in surface water.

== Evolution ==
It has been studied and recorded by scientists that at a beach in eastern Mexico, where Kemp's ridley turtles nest, a navigational error from the inclination angle over a period of one decade would lead the turtles only within an average of 23 kilometres (14 mi) from their natal region. Other locations resulted in navigational errors of over one hundred kilometers in the same period of time. Results from this study show that the navigational tool of geomagnetic imprinting is believed to only navigate the marine animals close to where they were born and then the animals rely on chemical cues of the tributaries and rivers to direct them to back to their birthplace.

These navigational errors have actually strengthened the evolutionary trait of natal homing for marine animals by resulting in some animals straying from their birthplace. Most animals return to their natal region because they know it is a safe place to lay their eggs. These regions will usually have few predators, the correct temperature and climate, and will have the right type of sand for turtles because they cannot lay eggs in wet and muddy environments.

The few animals that do not return to their natal region and stray to other places to reproduce will provide the species with a variety of different locations of reproduction, so if the original natal locations have changed, the species will have expanded to more places and will ultimately increase the species' survival chances.

== Future research ==
Although scientists have been studying marine animals that perform natal homing for years, they are still not positive that geomagnetic imprinting and chemical cues are the only navigational tools they use for their incredible migrations. There is still much more research to be done until scientists can fully understand how these animals can travel such great distances to reproduce. Fortunately, as technology has progressed, there are several tools now available to scientists such as data loggers equipped with magnetometers that can easily be attached to the animals. Not only do they give data showing the animal relative to the Earth's magnetic field, but some also give latitude based on this, longitude based on light levels, temperature, depth, etc. Pop-up satellite archival tags are used to gather data and have the ability to transfer this data via Argos System satellites to the scientist.

== See also ==
- Philopatry
- Salmon run
