= Phengodes laticollis =

Scientific classification
- Kingdom: Animalia
- Phylum: Arthropoda
- Class: Insecta
- Order: Coleoptera
- Suborder: Polyphaga
- Infraorder: Elateriformia
- Family: Phengodidae
- Genus: Phengodes
- Species: P. laticollis

Binomial name
- Phengodes laticollis LeConte, 1881

Species of beetle

Phengodes laticollis is a species of the beetle within the family of Phengodidae. The name Phengodidae is the scientific name for a beetle in which their larvae are glowworms and are thus named for their bioluminescent qualities (specifically amongst the females). The beetle family is primarily found in the New World, where most of the diversity in this particular species of beetle is found in tropical America. They are also a species in which are deemed vulnerable, particularly in West Virginia. Within the Phengodes laticollis, the females are larger than the males and the females are in larviform. The males are luminescent, the females and the larvae, however, have luminescent organs on their trunk segments. This allows for yellow or green light production.

== Description ==
Phengodes laticollis is more prevalent throughout the regions of the New World, especially within the areas of tropical America. The female and larvae of these species are considered the largest light producing animal in regions like central Pennsylvania. They range from 14 to 20 millimeters. The females have an outer appearance of orange and black splotches. They are considered more larva-like than other beetles, hence the larviform designation.

The male glowworm beetle is much smaller in comparison. The adult males often range from 3.3 to 25 millimeters in length and are brown and black in appearance. They have large mandibles that are curved, and forewings that are short and positioned towards the tip. The wings of the male P. laticollis also appear to be lined and wrinkled. Their eyes are large and appear to peer from the sides of their heads.

Phengodes laticollis belongs to a species that are medially smoother, and lengthways longer, known as the frontalis Lec. Both of these species have rounder pronotums (a plate like structure that covers the thorax of insects).

The eggs of these species tend to be oval and white. The eggs are luminescent as well, but they can take up to one month to become luminous after being laid. It is also known that the eggs that are laid on the ground within groups are encapsulated by the female glowworm beetle for a certain amount of time. The larvae, however, are in vermiform where they are seen as tubular shaped and have stout legs. The heads of the larvae point forwards more prominently and their antenna are divided into three parts (one pair of single lens on their side of the head).

== Subspecies ==
These two subspecies belong to the species Phengodes laticollis:

- Phengodes laticollis laticollis LeConte, 1881
- Phengodes laticollis meridiana Wittmer, 1976

== Anatomy of glowworm beetles ==
Further, in the article, "Rendering the inedible edible: Circumvention of a millipede's chemical defense by a predaceous beetle larva (Phengodidae)", by Thomas Eisner, Maria Eisner, Athula B. Attygalle, and Jerrold Meinwald, looking at the anatomy of Glowworm Beetles, specifically their feeding apparatus, there can be a lot revealed. Firstly, the P. laticollis's larva has a lower jaw that is jutting out to an unusual amount. The mouth also appears to be smaller, whereas the mandible seems to have a more cylindrical shape to it. The article additionally points out, "The mandibles could clearly serve for both uptake and delivery of fluid," (Eisner, 1998). This illustrated how the larvae of the P. laticollis species can use their mandibles for the intake of food or to relieve what comes out of their internal system. Secondly, when seeing the internal gut organs of the P. laticollis species, the article made it know that there was "no evidence of special glandular sacs, such as might act as venom glands,"(Eisner, 1998), which may illustrate just how the larvae of P. laticollis acts a predator.

== Biophysical and biochemical Aspects of railroad-worm beetles ==
When looking at the research done on the biophysical and biochemical aspects of railroad-worms, and their bioluminescence done by Vadim R. Viviani and Etelvino J. H. Bechara, it was uncovered that "The different bioluminescence colors of the lanterns of Phrixothrix species and other phengodid species are probably elicited by the presence of luciferase isoenzymes" (Viviani and Bechara, 1993). This luciferase enzyme is known to produce light photons from substrates that allow it to do so.

This study analyzed biophysical and biochemical nature of bioluminescent phengodids, and the temperature and pH effects of the bioluminescence strength. The study had also looked into the luciferin of fireflies in comparison with that of the luciferase for ATP. Nevertheless, this study did lack the proper nature for using a wealthier number of phengodids which later affected how the study was able to regain pure luciferases to understand the chemical nature of this enzyme.

When looking into the bioluminescence spectrum, it was shown that the phengodid larvae in this experiment had a large range of colors in luminescence specifically within the Coleoptera families, where the colors had been from green to red (illustrating each maximum). Now when looking at the Luciferase and its relation to that of phengodids and lampyrids, this experiment noted that, ("we show that the bioluminescent system of phengodids is basically the same as that of lampyrids and elaterids, having the same luciferin… and luciferases with similar physicochemical properties to those of lampyrids"). This conclusion presents the nature of similarities between the glowworm/railroad-worm beetles and that of fireflies, since they both carry luminescent qualities.

== Mating in glowworm beetles ==
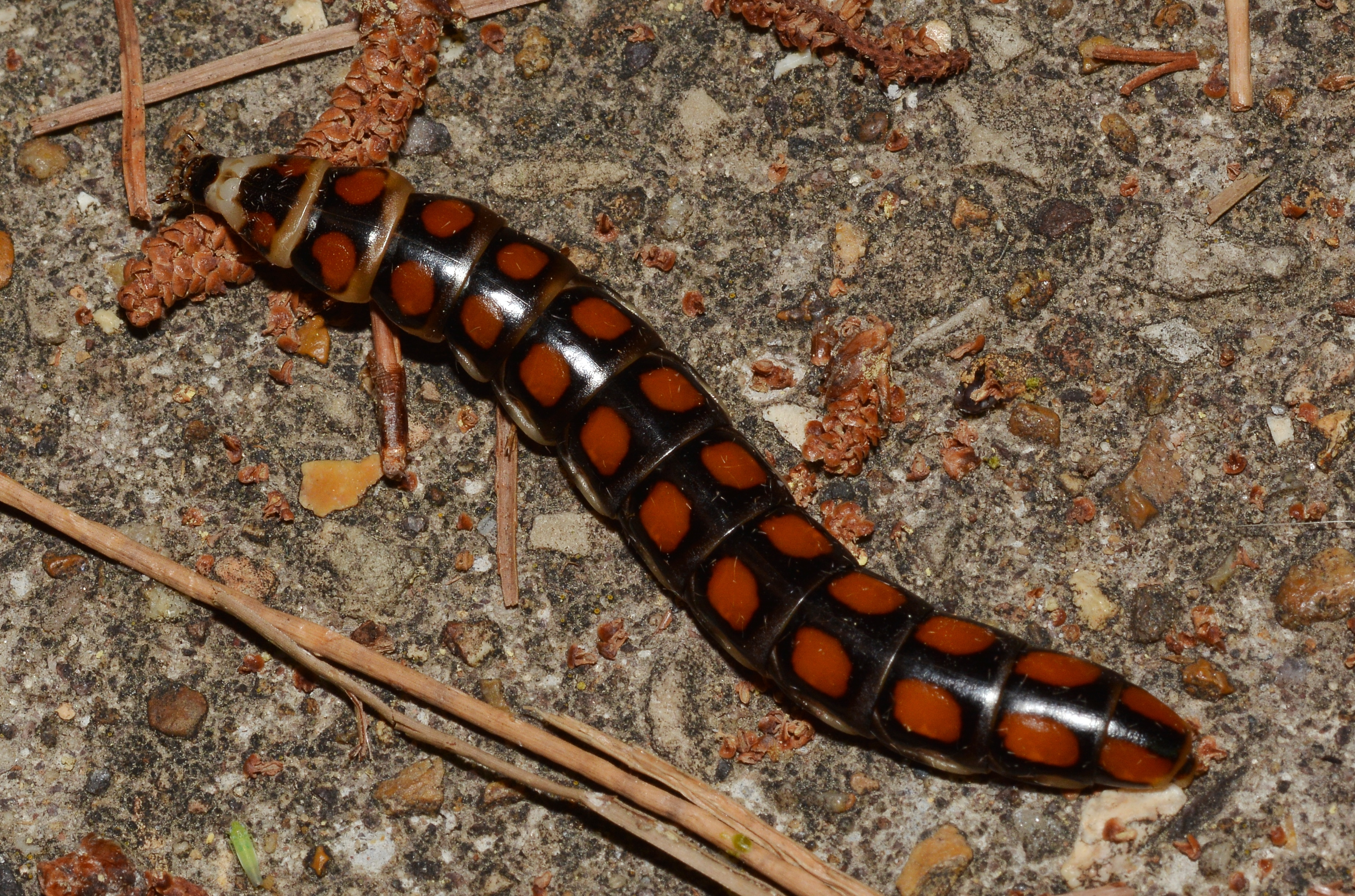
"Third time mothing at Hawn State Park in Genevieve, Missouri on 6/9/19" by: Andy Reago and Chrissy McClarren https://www.flickr.com/people/80270393@N06

The larvae of the glowworm beetle are found on wet soil or on trees of leaves, where moisture levels are higher above the ground, hence why these glowworm beetles can be found on the trees of leaves and on bark. When looking specifically at the male and female species of these glowworm beetles, they tend to be more active at night. When the males are looking to mate with their female counterparts, they tend to find the female glowworms by the pheromones. Pheromones are chemicals that are produced by one species that affects the behavior of the animal of the same species. Pheromones in this instance can aid in reproduction and interactions amongst the males and females, but specifically for glowworm beetles, this is a way for the males to find potential mates. Moreover, there has been evidence to reveal that females use their glowing as a warning to nocturnal predators at night (Viviani and Bechara 1997).

== Predator-prey relationship ==
One of larvae's prey is the millipede, Floridobolus penneri. The larvae attacks the millipede in three ways. The larvae kills the millipede through injecting its own intestinal fluid. Once attacked, the millipede is unable to release its glands. Third, the larvae does not pierce the glands of the millipede when feeding on it. Overall, the researchers were able to understand that the larvae devours its prey without having to come into contact with the millipede's toxic secretion.

Viewing the secretion of F. penneri, it mainly consists of 1,4-benzoquinones, where 95% of the secretion has been made up by 2-methyl-1,4-benzoquinone and 2-,ethoxy-3-methyl-1,4-benzoquinone. The researchers had retrieved F. penneri gland samples with methylene chloride to study the quinone content. During the predation tests, the P. laticollis had encounters within plastic cages and had been given a millipede, but the P. laticollis was set to be in these cages individually. Now, the researchers then observed the results from this experiment and had found that in the Phengodid's offense, the P. laticollis larvae would find the millipede and "mounted it, and promptly threw a coil around its front end," (Eisner, et al., 1998) and as a response, the millipede would coil itself inwards and after a few seconds the millipede succumbed to the P. laticollis.

Nevertheless, the millipede did not emit a secretion from its glands as a result of the P. laticollis' attack. The researchers then went to understand how the millipede was exactly killed, and found that the phengodid larva kills its prey by injecting enteric fluid. They tested this hypothesis by using the midgut fluids from two larvae and injected that fluid into four millipedes to observe their hypothesis. Two of the samples from the P. laticollis was diluted and two other samples from the same species was not diluted. It was found that the two millipedes that received the undiluted sample had been immediately affected by the injections, whereas the two millipedes that had received the diluted sample took time before they went limp and became affected by the injection. In essence, the P. laticollis has a very concise and strategic way of avoiding and evading F. penneri.
