= Floridobolus =

Florida scrub millipedes

Scientific classification
- Kingdom: Animalia
- Phylum: Arthropoda
- Subphylum: Myriapoda
- Class: Diplopoda
- Order: Spirobolida
- Family: Spirobolidae; Keeton, 1959
- Subfamily: Floridobolinae
- Tribe: Floridobolini
- Genus: Floridobolus; Causey, 1957

Type species
- Floridobolus penneri Causey, 1957

Species
- F. floydi Shelley et al., 2014; F. orini Shelley, 2014; F. penneri Causey, 1957

Genus of millipedes

Floridobolus is a genus of millipedes commonly known as Florida scrub millipedes containing three described species: Floridobolus penneri, F. orini, and F. floydi; the latter two described in 2014. All three species are endemic to Florida scrub habitat of peninsular Florida, and F. penneri is considered a critically imperiled species by NatureServe. Prior to the description of F. orini, the genus (then only a single species) was considered the sole member of the family Floridobolidae, named by William T. Keeton in 1959, however studies in 2014 have argued that Floridobolus does not represent a distinct family but rather is a basal member of the family Spirobolidae, representing the subfamily Floridobolinae, and tribe Floridobolini.

== Description ==
Species of Floridobolus range from 52 to 92 mm (2.0 to 3.6 in) long with 45 to 50 body rings or segments as adults. The body is not purely cylindrical, but rather is widest around the 12th or 13th rings, and tapers towards the head and telson (rear end). The body is oval in cross section whereas most other related millipedes are circular in cross section. The body color ranges from slate gray to olive, with some species more uniform while others having lighter yellowish bands on the rear margin of body rings.

== Species ==
The three species of Floridobolus differ primarily in shape and proportion of the gonopods (male reproductive appendages), and in geographic location, each occurring on different sand ridges running from north to south in Florida.

=== Floridobolus penneri ===
F. penneri is considered Critically Imperiled by NatureServe

Floridobolus penneri was described in 1957 by Nell B. Causey based on individuals collected near the Archbold Biological Station. Mature individuals generally range from 75 to 92 mm (3.0 to 3.6 in) long and 10.8 to 11.6 mm wide. Its known natural predators include larval Phengodes laticollis (glowworm beetles) and adult Mastigoproctus giganteus (giant whip scorpions). F. penneri has been assessed by NatureServe as critically imperiled globally and nationally due to a range of less than 1,000 square kilometers (400 square miles), few populations known, and historic decline in Florida scrub habitat.

=== Floridobolus orini ===
Floridobolus orini was described in 2014 and is only known from the Ocala National Forest. Individuals grow from 68 to 80 mm (2.7 to 3.1 in) long, 10 to 13 mm wide, and possess 47 to 50 body rings (segments). The body color is gray with body rings bordered in yellow.

=== Floridobolus floydi ===
Floridobolus floydi was also described in 2014, based on individuals collected in Citrus and Hernando counties, occurring further west than other Floridobolus species. With a median body length of around 61 mm (2.4 in), F. floydi is generally smaller than other Floridobolus.
