= William Keeton =

American ethologist and professor (1933–1980)

William T. Keeton
- Born: February 3, 1933; Roanoke, Virginia
- Died: August 17, 1980 (aged 47); Ithaca, New York
- Education: University of Chicago (B.S.); Virginia Tech (M.S.); Cornell University (PhD)
- Known for: Animal navigation, millipede taxonomy
- Spouse: Barbara Orcutt Keeton
- Scientific career
- Fields: Zoology
- Workplaces: Cornell University
- Thesis: A taxonomic study of the milliped family Spirobolidae (Diplopoda; Spirobolida) (1960)
- Doctoral advisor: Howard E. Evans

William Tinsley Keeton (February 3, 1933 – August 17, 1980) was an American zoologist known internationally for his work on animal behavior, especially bird migration, and for his work on millipede taxonomy. He was a well-liked professor of biology at Cornell University in Ithaca, New York and author of a widely used introductory textbook, Biological Science.

== Biography ==
William Keeton was born February 3, 1933, in Roanoke, Virginia, and grew up in Lynchburg. Keeton attended the University of Chicago and received both his Bachelor of Arts and the Bachelor of Science degrees, working under Dr. Alfred E. Emerson. Keeton earned a master's degree at Virginia Polytechnic Institute (Virginia Tech), during which he revised the millipede genus Brachoria. During his time at Virginia Tech, Keeton met Barbara Orcutt, whom he married in 1958. He moved to Cornell University in 1956 in order to continue his research with millipede systematics for his doctorate, where he studied under Dr. Howard E. Evans. His doctoral research culminated in a monograph on the family Spirobolidae. He received his doctorate in 1958 and joined the biology faculty at Cornell University as a biology professor in 1958.

Keeton was a noted and well-known Biological Science 101 professor beginning in 1958, so much so that his popularity as a professor earned his class the nickname of the "Keeton course". In addition to his teaching Keeton is known for his work with pigeons and bird orientation and navigation, as he studied pigeon homing behaviors for well over a decade.

During his early work at Cornell University the Biological Science Departments were reorganized, and as a result William Keeton moved from the Entomology Department to the newly created Neurobiology and Behavior Department. It was here where he first started his research on pigeon homing, which led him to the discoveries of the effects of the Earth's magnetic field, the position of the Sun, as well as olfactory navigation and visual cues involved in the process that pigeons use to find their way home. Cornell University built Keeton a loft large enough to house two thousand pigeons that were the subjects of Keeton's experiments on the behaviors and processes involved in pigeon homing. Both students and faculty at Cornell University, as well as other scientists from around the world came and worked alongside William Keeton in his pigeon loft.

William Keeton is also known for his work in writing the biology textbook named Biological Science, that was first published by the W.W. Norton & Company in 1967. It took Keeton approximately five years to write the first edition of the textbook. It went through three editions before his death in 1980. After Keeton's death the textbook was revised for editions 4, 5, and 6 by James L. Gould (and Carol Gould). The textbook was a combination of both botany and zoology. This combination of sciences turned out to be extremely successful in teaching many aspects of biology. The textbook was one of the first that integrated zoology and botany and sought common themes, guided by the process of evolution.

Keeton died from heart attack on August 17, 1980, due to a failure of a mechanical heart valve. He was 47 years old.

== Work with pigeons ==
William Keeton had always had a fascination with pigeon homing techniques from the time he was a child. When he was nine years old he received his first homing pigeons which he raced and trained with his friends. Many scientists held speculative ideas about the techniques that pigeons might be using, including the use of the position of the Sun, the Earth's magnetic field, landmark recognition and olfactory navigation. William Keeton tested these various speculations throughout his time at Cornell University.

=== Magnetic interference ===
Homing pigeons were a central subject of Keeton's work

In William Keeton's 1970 Magnets Interfere with Pigeon Homing paper, William Keeton proved that pigeons were affected by changes in the magnetic field surrounding them, and that pigeons were using the Earth's magnetic field as one way of finding their way home. In this experiment, William Keeton attached magnets to the back of pigeons just before they were released and measured their vanishing point (in what direction they had flown out of sight) and the time it took to find their way home for both the experimental birds and with the control birds (control birds had a piece of brass glued to their back of the same weight as the magnet).

Keeton's results showed that when the Sun was visible, the magnets would not usually prevent the birds from finding their way home, but when the sky was overcast the birds with magnets on their back were much more unsuccessful and slower at finding their way back home than the control birds. Previous scientists had shown that pigeons were not relying entirely on the sun to navigate home as many scientists had speculated, when they found that many pigeons were able to navigate successfully under completely overcast skies. This notion led Keeton to question whether the pigeons were using the Earth's magnetic field to orient themselves and navigate home successfully. Keeton's experiments with magnets showed that there was a combination of processes being used by the pigeons to navigate home, but the use of the Earth's magnetic field was very important for pigeon orientation and navigation.

Under clear skies with the Sun visible, both the birds with magnets and the birds without magnets had little trouble navigating back to the loft, yet at unfamiliar locations with overcast skies the birds with magnets glued to their backs were unable to successfully orient themselves and navigate back to the loft. Keeton speculated that this was occurring because the birds without magnets were able to use the Earth's magnetic fields to orient themselves in the correct direction, whereas the birds with magnets attached to their backs were unable to use the Sun, familiar landmarks, or the Earth's magnetic fields to find their way home. This discovery was extremely useful in explaining one of the most interesting questions of bird navigation.

=== Olfactory interference ===
Many scientists hypothesized that pigeons were using olfactory information as part of the process in finding their way back to the loft. In Italy, a study by N.E. Baldaccini, in which the bills of pigeons were applied with a strong odor, showed results that the pigeons had less accurate initial orientation. Baldaccini also performed an experiment in which he reared pigeons in a loft in which the wind was deflected by 45 degrees. Baldaccini's results showed that a deflection in the wind while the pigeons were young proved to have an effect on their initial orientation after being released. Keeton replicated this experiment but found that there was a smaller deflection than the results in Baldaccini's experiment in Italy. Keeton speculated that there may be an effect on initial orientation based on an olfactory map, but the experiment was too general for proving that this was indeed what was occurring in this experiment.

=== Bibliography of orientation publications ===
Books and chapters

- Keeton, William. (1972). Effects of magnets on pigeon homing. pp. 579–594 in Animal Orientation and Navigation. NASA SP-262. Washington, D.C.
- Keeton, William. (1974). The orientational and navigational basis of homing in birds. pp. 47–132 in Advances in the study of behavior, Vol. 5. New York, Academic Press.
- Keeton, William. (1977). Magnetic reception (biology). In Encyclopedia of science and technology, 2nd Ed. New York, McGraw-Hill.
- Keeton, William. (1979). Pigeon navigation. pp. 5–20 in Neural mechanisms of behavior in the pigeon. ( A.M. Granda and J. H. Maxwell, Eds.). New York, Plenum Publishing Corp.
Journal articles (click Show at right to see)
  - Keeton, William. (1969). Orientation by pigeons: is the sun necessary? Science 165: 922-928.
  - Keeton, William. (1970). Orientation by pigeons: a reply. Science 168: 153.
  - Keeton, William & Gobeft, A. (1970). Orientation by untrained pigeons requires the sun. Proc. National Academy of Science 65: 853-856.
  - Keeton, William. (1970). Comparative orientational and homing performances of single pigeons and small flocks. Auk 87: 797 799.
  - Keeton, William. (1970). Do pigeons determine latitudinal displacement from the sun's altitude? Nature 227: 626-627.
  - Keeton, William. (1970). "Distance effect" in pigeon orientation: an evaluation. Biol. Bull. 139: 510-527.
  - Keeton, William. (1971). Magnets interfere with pigeon homing. Proc. National Academy of Science 68: 102-106.
  - Keeton, William. (1971). Unconventional theories of orientation: a panel discussion. Ann. New York Academy of Science 188: 331-333, 338-340, 348-349, 351, 353-354.
  - Keeton, William. (1971). The development and evolution of orientation: a panel discussion. Ann. New York Academy of Science 188: 410-402, 405.
  - Keeton, William & Alexander, J.R. (1972). The effect of directional training on initial orientation in pigeons. Auk 89: 280-298.
  - Keeton, William. (1973). Release-site bias as a possible guide to the "map" component in pigeon homing. J. Comp. Physiol. 86: 1-16.
  - Keeton, William & Kreithen, M.L. (1974). Detection of changes in atmospheric pressure by the homing pigeon, Columba livia. J. Comp. Physiol. 89: 73 82.
  - Keeton, William & Kreithen, M.L. (1974). Detection of polarized light by the homing pigeon, Columba livia. J. Comp. Physiol. 89: 83-92.
  - Keeton, William & Kreithen, M.L. (1974). Attempts to condition homing pigeons to magnetic stimuli. J. Comp. Physiol. 91: 355-362.
  - Keeton, William & Alexander, J.R. (1974). Clock-shifting effect on initial orientation of pigeons. Auk 91: 370-374.
  - Keeton, William & Larkin, T.S. & Windsor, D. M. (1974). Normal fluctuations in the Earth's magnetic field influence pigeon orientation. J. Comp. Physiol. 95: 95-103.
  - Keeton, William. (1974). The mystery of pigeon homing. Science Amer. 231: 96-107.
  - Keeton, William. (1974). Pigeon homing: no influence of outward-journey on initial orientation. Monitore Zool. Ital. (N.S.) 8: 227-234.
  - Keeton, William & Brown, A. I. (1976). Homing behavior of pigeons not disturbed by application of an olfactory stimulus. J. Comp. Physiol. 105: 259-266.
  - Keeton, William, Wiltschko, W. & Wiltschko, R. (1976). Effects of a "permanent" clock-shift on the orientation of young homing pigeons. Behavioral Ecology and Sociobiology 1: 229-243.
  - Keeton, William & Larkin, T. (1976). Bar magnets mask the effect of normal magnetic disturbances on pigeon orientation. J. Comp. Physiol. 110: 227-232.
  - Keeton, William. (1977). Biological sensitivity to magnetic fields in orientational responses. In Brain interactions with weak electric and magnetic fields, Neurosci. Research Prog. Bull. 15: 22-27.
  - Keeton, William & Schmidt-Koenig, K. (1977). Sun compass utilization by pigeons wearing frosted contact lenses. Auk 94: 143-145.
  - Keeton, William, Yodlowskia, M.L. & Kreithen, M.L. (1977). Detection of atmospheric infrasound by the homing pigeon. Nature 265: 725-726.
  - Keeton, William & Edrich, W. (1977). A comparison of homing behavior in feral and homing pigeons. Z. Tierpsychol. 44: 389-401.
  - Keeton, William. (1977). Migratory behavior. In Encyclopedia of science and technology, 2nd Ed. New York, McGraw-Hill.
  - Keeton, William, Kreithen, M.L. & Hermayer, K.L. (1977). Orientation by pigeons deprived of olfaction by nasal tubes. J. Comp. Physiol. 114: 289-299.
  - Keeton, William, Waldvogel, J.A., Benvenuti, S. & Papi, F. (1979). Homing pigeon orientation influenced by deflected winds at home loft. J. Comp. Physiol. 128:297-301.
  - Keeton, William, Papi, F., Brown, A.I. & Benvenuti, S. (1979). Do American and Italian pigeons rely on different homing mechanisms? J. Comp. Physiol. 128: 303-317.
  - Keeton, William. (1979). Avian orientation and navigation. Annu. Rev. Physiol. 41: 353-366.
  - Keeton, William. (1979). Avian orientation and navigation: a brief overview. Brit. Birds, 17: 451-470
  - Keeton, William & Hermayer, K. L. (1979). Homing behavior of pigeons subjected to bilateral olfactory nerve section. Monitore Zool. Ital. (N.S.) 13: 303-313.
  - Keeton, William & Waldvogel, J. A., Phillips, J.B. & McCorkle, D.R. (1980). Short-term residence in deflector lofts alters initial orientation of homing pigeons. Behav. Ecol. and Sociobiol. 7:207-211.

== Work with millipedes ==
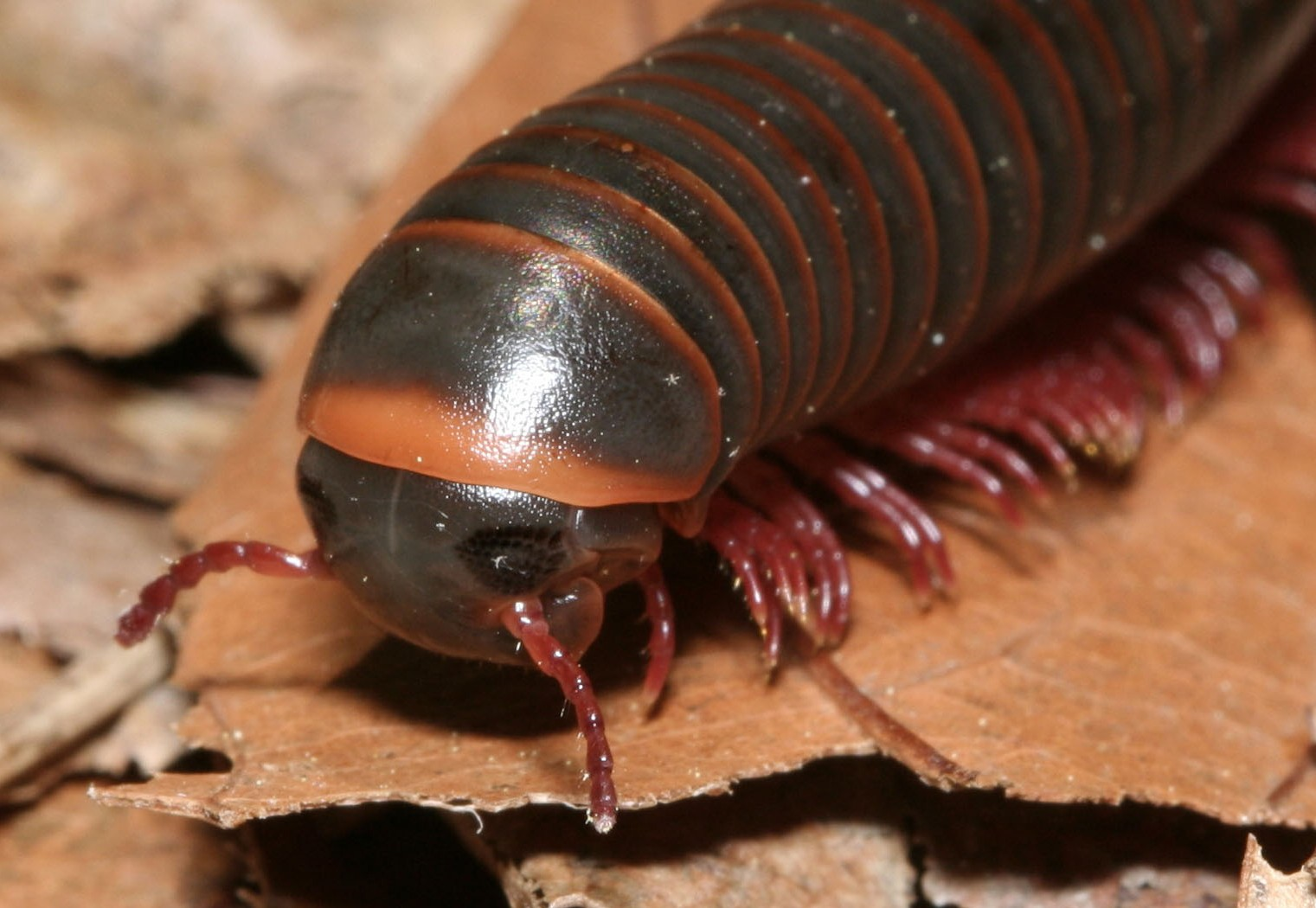
Keeton brought nine previously named species under synonymy with Narceus americanus

Prior to his work on animal navigation, Keeton studied the systematics and taxonomy of millipedes. His Master's thesis at Virginia Tech was a revision of the genus Brachoria, a Xystodesmid of the order Polydesmida. His doctoral research at Cornell resulted in a monograph of the family Spirobolidae (order Spirobolida) published in 1960, that garnered praise as bringing order and clarity to "a chaos of unrelated genera replete with poorly-known species". He split the family into two subfamilies and reduced the number of species through synonymy - determining that various named species actually belonged to previously described species. He made many field excursions to the Appalachian Mountains with fellow millipede expert Richard L. Hoffman, and also made an extended collecting trip to the Vulcan San Martin of Veracruz, Mexico. He published a total of 13 works on millipedes, in which he named 19 new species, two new genera, and the new families Allopocockiidae and Floridobolidae, both of the order Spirobolida. He also studied development and morphogenesis, and worked with Dr. Thomas Eisner on characterizing the defensive secretions of six species of the order Spirostreptida.

Bibliography of millipede research (click Show at right to see)
  - Keeton, William Tinsley (1959): A new family for the diplopod genus Floridobolus (Spirobolida, Spirobolidea). – Bulletin of the Brooklyn Entomological Society 54: 1-7.
  - Keeton, William Tinsley (1959): A revision of the milliped genus Brachoria (Polydesmida: Xystodesmidae). – Proceedings of the United States National Museum 109 (3411): 1-58.
  - Keeton, William Tinsley (1960): A new family of millipeds of the order Spirobolida, with notes on an established family. – Proceedings of the Biological Society of Washington 73: 131-140.
  - Keeton, William Tinsley (1960): A new genus and species of Xystodesmid milliped from Tennessee. – Bulletin of the Brooklyn Entomological Society 55: 42-45.
  - Keeton, William Tinsley (1960): A taxonomic study of the milliped family Spirobolidae (Diplopoda: Spirobolida). – Memoirs of the American Entomological Society 17: 1-146.
  - Hoffman, Richard Lawrence; Keeton, William Tinsley (1960): A list of the generic names proposed in the Diplopod order Spirobolida, with their type species. – Transactions of the American Entomological Society 86: 1-26.
  - Berns, M. W.; Keeton, William Tinsley (1963): Regulation of segment-building during the post-embryonic development of a common milliped. – Science (Washington DC) 161: 590-592.
  - Keeton, William Tinsley (1964): Amblybolus genus nov. – Pilot register of zoology 5
  - Keeton, William Tinsley (1964): Amblybolus mitis species nov. – Pilot register of zoology 6
  - Keeton, William Tinsley (1965): Description of three new species of Brachoria, with notes on established species (Diplopoda, Polydesmida, Xystodesmidae). – Proceedings of the Biological Society of Washington 78: 225-240.
  - Eisner, Thomas; Hurst, J. J.; Keeton, W. T.; Meinwald, Y. (1965): Defense mechanisms of arthropods. XVI. Para-benzoquinones in the secretion of spirostreptoid millipedes. – Annals of the Entomological Society of America 58 (2): 247-248.
  - Keeton, William Tinsley (1966): The species of the milliped genus Tylobolus (Diplopoda: Spirobolida). A re-examination. – Transactions of the American Entomological Society 92: 17-28.
  - Berns, M. W.; Keeton, William Tinsley (1968): Effects of semi-starvation on growth and morphogenesis during the larval stages of a common milliped, Narceus annularis (Raf.). – Biological Bulletin (Woods Hole) 135: 454-465.

== Awards and honors ==
Keeton's work was recognized by many honors and distinguished positions, including:

- Fellow of the American Ornithologists' Union
- Liberty Hyde Bailey chair professorship
- Chairman of the Department of Neurobiology and Behavior at Cornell
- Member of the Cornell University Board of Trustees
- Honorary Doctor of Science degree from Coe College, Iowa
- Visiting professorship at the Max Planck Institute for Behavioral Physiology, Germany
- Visiting professorship at the University of Konstanz, Germany
- Plenary speaker at the XVII International Ornithological Congress in Berlin (1978)
- "Professor of Merit" award from the Cornell graduating class of 1966

== Legacy ==
Keeton is the namesake of William Keeton House, a residential house of Cornell University that opened in 2008. He is also the namesake of the Keeton Prize, established in 1991 and awarded by faculty to outstanding Cornell undergraduate students.
