= Olfactory navigation =

Hypothetical navigation method of homing pigeons

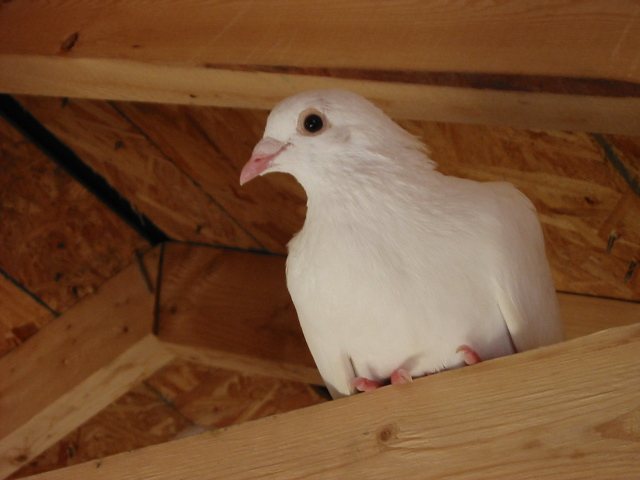
It is possible that homing pigeons may navigate by smell

Olfactory navigation is a hypothesis that proposes the usage of the sense of smell by pigeons, in particular the mail pigeon, in navigation and homing.

There are two principal versions. Papi's mosaic model proposes that pigeons construct a map from the distribution of environmental odours, within a radius of 70–100 kilometres. Wallraff's gradient theory overcomes the problem of distance limitation by proposing the existence of long-range, stable atmospheric odour gradients. However, the evidence to suggest that pigeons use an ‘olfactory map’ in order to home is not conclusive.

== Background ==
Homing can be defined as the ability to return to a set point from potentially anywhere on the Earth's surface, including destinations that are unfamiliar. There are two criteria needed to coordinate this task, a compass sense (a sense of direction) and a map sense (a sense of location). It is the ability to return from unfamiliar locations that posed the question of what sensory cues are used to determine locational information as well as directional information. It has been proposed that the compass sense can be derived from a number of perspectives. Magnetic orientation as a mechanism for directional sense was first put forward in the 19th century. Equally, the sun could be used as a compass in order to navigate home. In 1972, however, Papi and his contemporaries reported that anosmic pigeons (Columbia livia) were severely impaired in orientation and homing performance. On the basis of their results, the hypothesis of ‘olfactory navigation’ was proposed.

== Olfactory map ==
Two models for olfactory navigation have been proposed, Papi's ‘mosaic’ model and Wallraff's ‘gradient’ model. Papi's mosaic hypothesis advocates that pigeons construct a map from the distribution of environmental odours, within a radius of 70-100 kilometres.

From this information, it is possible to derive the ‘home’ direction when encountering these odours at a release site. An example of associated wind-borne scents would be pine forests, coastlines and pollution from cities. It is argued that pigeons first learn to associate specific odours with particular locations during exercise and training flights. This model has the advantage that it requires the bird only to detect the presence or absence of a range of odours. Therefore, homing is viable only if the release sites are within a proximity that can provide reliable wind-borne cues, although Papi (1990), argues the utilisation of olfactory information obtained during the outward journey.

Wallraff's gradient theory overcomes the problem of distance limitation via different means. It proposes the existence of long-range, stable atmospheric odour gradients. The foundation for this navigational map is a spatial representation in which two or more environmental odours have a particular intensity. Odour gradient differs along dissimilar directional axes and, therefore, the pigeon can compare the intensity of the scent at a particular location to its concentration at the home loft. This mechanism in principle could operate over vast distances, but would require the detection and interpretation of minute differences in odour concentration. However, a more poignant question is the existence of predictable odour gradients. Meteorologists deny that odour gradients, as required by this hypothesis, exist in nature.

== Empirical evidence ==
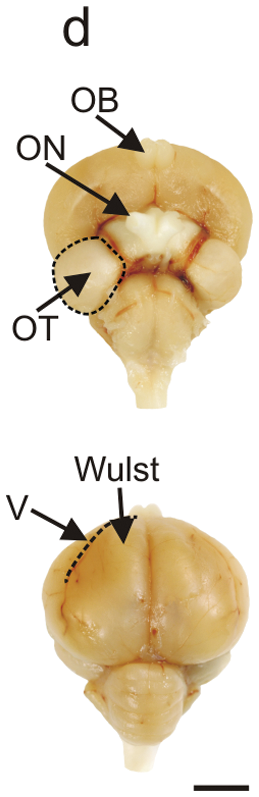
Brain of a pigeon, with the olfactory bulb noted as "OB."

The olfactory navigation hypothesis states that pigeons learn an odour map by associating smells perceived at the home loft with the directions from which they are carried by winds. Therefore, attempts to manipulate the development of that have involved changing the direction of wind, shielding birds from winds of a certain direction and exposing the pigeons to artificial odorants. The predication is that the experimental pigeons should learn an altered map and thus when released, they should fly according to their distorted perception.

Such an experiment was conducted, where two groups of pigeons were reared in separate, although identical aviaries composed of bamboo. Group one had air blown from the south containing olive oil and air from the north containing synthetic turpentine. This was reversed for group two. The pigeons were then released east of the loft; half had a drop of synthetic turpentine added to the bill, while the others were given a drop of olive oil. Pigeons from group one exposed to olive oil flew north, contrary to birds sentient to synthetic turpentine, which flew south. Consistent, but reversed results were found in group two.

There has been a failure to replicate these results in other countries, such as Germany, Italy and the United States, even when considerable effort has been made to employ identical procedures. Nevertheless, further experiments applied two different methods – namely the placement of fans near the home coop in order to reverse wind direction and usage of deflector lofts to shift the apparent direction of the wind by 90°. Deflector lofts comprised wooden or glass baffles, which deflected wind course and therefore any signature odours. Findings were that pigeons raised in such lofts oriented themselves with a magnitude of a 90° error, known as the ‘deflector loft effect’. The wind reversed experiments, too, exhibited results that favoured the olfactory hypothesis, with experimentals on average flying in the opposing direction of home, while the controls took the correct flight path, when released from the same site.

In replication of the deflector loft experiments, similar findings were produced, though when anosmic pigeons where employed, they displayed the same degree of error in orientation as had previously been observed. Therefore, suggesting that the detection of odours may not have been associated with the defector loft effect. Indeed, the flight directions could simply reflect a directional response to wind experienced in the loft or by “other non-odorous factors”, such as light reflection. Researchers support these suggestions by noting the lack of highly developed nasal apparatus and associated brain functions in seed-eating birds such as pigeons. It could be argued, therefore, that pigeons are not dominated by olfactory landmarks when constructing a navigation map.

Conflicting evidence, however, was produced when pigeons were housed in open cages and exposed to a fan produced air current carrying the scent of benzaldehyde. When released with exposure only to the natural air during transport and at the release site, both experimentals and controls were homeward oriented. Contrary if their response were simply to wind direction.

A consistent feature of the olfaction experiments is that anosmic pigeons that are released from familiar sites are essentially unaffected. Perhaps a common fault of the olfactory mosaic and gradient model of olfactory navigation is that each model is over simplistic and that they do not sufficiently take account of other cues that may be of importance.

== Other sensory cues ==
The Earth's magnetic field is a potential map cue as the field varies in both strength and direction over the Earth's surface Manipulations of the ambient magnetic field are rather difficult, although Keeton (1971) and Ioalé (1984) did report that magnets caused disorientation in pigeons when they were released under total overcast. This first indication for magnetic compass orientation in homing was later supported by other studies, which reversed the field around the head of the pigeon using battery operated coils. Though the coils had little effect in clear conditions, their effect under overcast conditions was dependent on the direction of the current. Another observation consistent with the idea of a geomagnetic map is the shift in the initial bearings of pigeons that occurs when the field increases during magnetic storms. In magnetic anomalies too, pigeons are disoriented, even under sunny conditions.

The predictable 15° movement per hour of the Sun from east to west, signifies its potential as a celestial compass. This is possible providing the time of day is known and is achievable by birds due to their internal biological clock. Experiments to test this hypothesis, using the migratory European starling, indicated that the direction of migration could be manipulated by reflecting the angle of the Sun. This effect was reproduced using homing pigeons. Although this study is of value in demonstrating mechanisms other than olfaction in bird navigation, it does not refer to pigeons.

== Inconclusive evidence ==
The fundamental question of olfaction map sense in pigeons is ‘can they smell?’ Available evidence suggests that pigeons lack highly developed nasal apparatus and associated brain functions – yet empirical evidence has shown that the homing ability of pigeons can be compromised by interfering with the olfactory environment. However, the variability in the effects of olfactory manipulations indicates that odours are not the sole cues on which navigation is based and that map sense appears to rely on a comparison of available cues. Odour may still, however, be one of many navigational factors playing a highly variable role, though physical limitations and inconsistent findings render the olfactory hypothesis questionable.

== See also ==
- Salmon run
