= Salmon run =

Annual migration of salmon

A grizzly bear ambushing a jumping salmon during an annual salmon run

A salmon run is an annual fish migration event where many salmon species, which are typically hatched in fresh water and live most of their adult life downstream in the ocean, swim back against the stream to the upper reaches of rivers to spawn on the gravel beds of small creeks. After spawning, most Atlantic salmon and all species of Pacific salmon die, and the salmon life cycle starts over again with the new generation of hatchlings.

Salmon are anadromous, spending their juvenile life in rivers or lakes, and then migrating out to sea where they spend adult lives and gain most of their body mass. When they reach sexual maturity, the adults return to the upstream rivers to reproduce. Usually they return with uncanny precision to the natal river where they were born, and even to the very spawning ground of their birth. It is thought that, when they are in the ocean, they use magnetoreception to locate the general position of their natal river, and once close to the river, that they use their sense of smell to home in on the river entrance and even their natal spawning ground.

Trout, which are sister species of salmon, also perform similar migrations, although they mostly move potamodromously between creeks and large freshwater lakes, except for some coastal/estuary subspecies such as steelhead and sea trout that migrate seasonally between salty/brackish and fresh water just like salmon do. There are also landlocked populations of some salmon species that have adapted to spend their entire lives in freshwater like trout.

In Northwest America, salmons are keystone species, which means the ecological impact they have on other wildlife is greater than would be expected in relation to their biomass. Most salmon species migrate during the autumn (September through November), which coincides with the pre-winter activities of many hibernating animals. The annual salmon run can be a major feeding event for predators such as grizzly bears and bald eagles, as well as an important window period for sport fishermen.

The post-spawning death of salmon also has important ecological consequences, because the significant nutrients in their carcasses, rich in nitrogen, sulfur, carbon and phosphorus, are transferred from the ocean and released to inland aquatic ecosystems, terrestrial animals (such as bears) and the wetlands and riparian woodlands adjacent to the rivers. This has knock-on effects not only for the next generation of salmon, but to every wildlife species living in the riparian zones the salmon reach. The nutrients can also be washed downstream into estuaries where they accumulate and provide significant support for invertebrates and estuarine-breeding waterbirds.

== Background ==
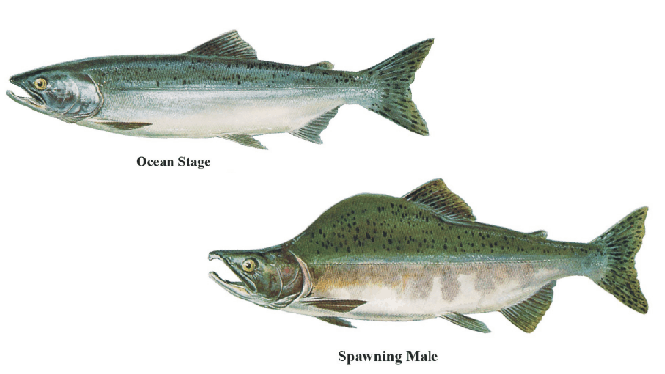
Adult ocean phase and spawning phase pink salmon (male)

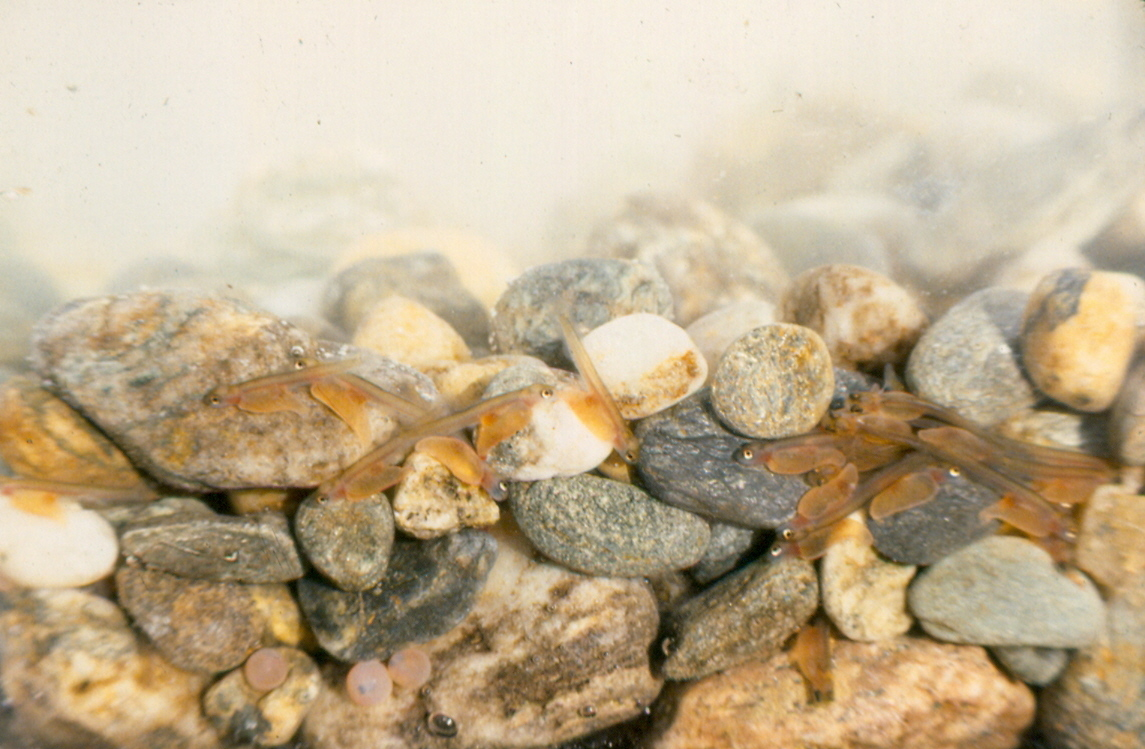
Sac fry remain in the gravel habitat of their redd (nest) until their yolk sac, or "lunch box", is depleted.

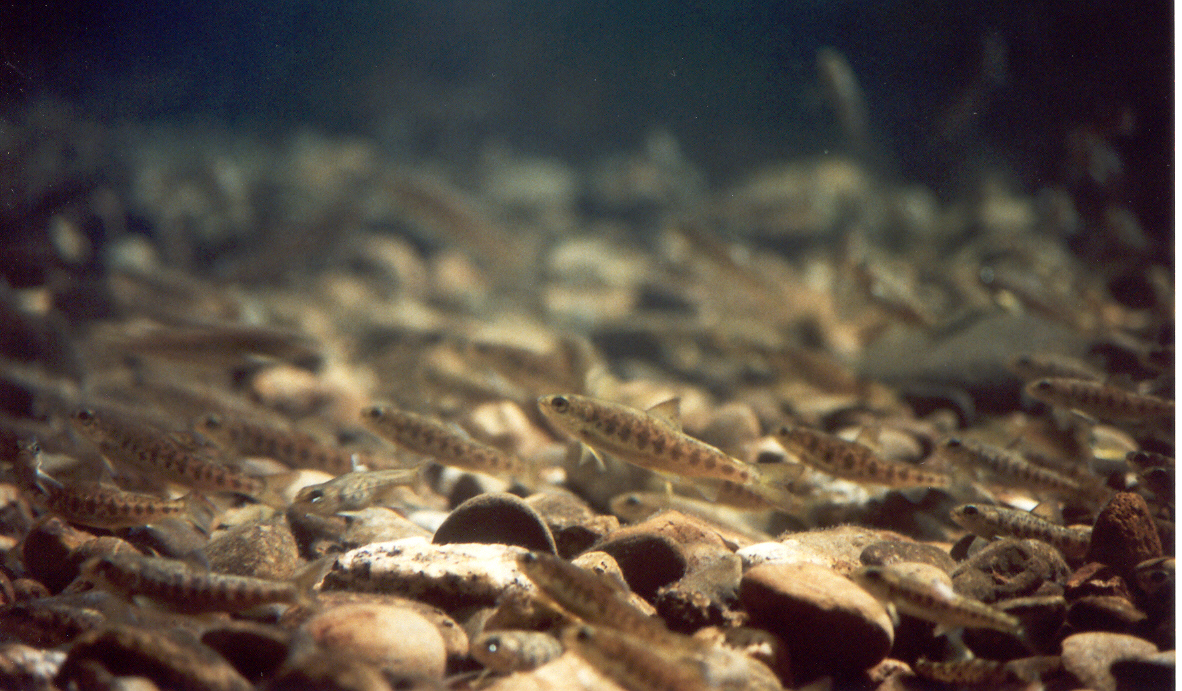
After depleting their yolk sac nutrients, the young salmon emerge from the gravel habitat as parr to feed.

Most salmon are anadromous, a term which comes from the Greek anadromos, meaning "running upward". Anadromous fish grow up mostly in the saltwater in oceans. When they have matured they migrate or "run up" freshwater rivers to spawn in what is called the salmon run.

Anadromous salmon are Northern Hemisphere fish that spend their ocean phase in either the Atlantic Ocean or the Pacific Ocean. They do not thrive in warm water. There is only one species of salmon found in the Atlantic, commonly called the Atlantic salmon. These salmon run up rivers on both sides of the ocean. Seven different species of salmon inhabit the Pacific (see table), and these are collectively referred to as Pacific salmon. Five of these species run up rivers on both sides of the Pacific, but two species are found only on the Asian side. In the early 19th century, Chinook salmon were successfully established in the Southern Hemisphere, far from their native range, in New Zealand rivers. Attempts to establish anadromous salmon elsewhere have not succeeded.

Species of anadromous salmon
Oceans	Coasts	Species	Maximum			Comment
Oceans	Coasts	Species	length	weight	life span	Comment
North Atlantic	Both sides	Atlantic salmon	150 cm	46.8 kg	13 years	
North Pacific	Both sides	Chinook salmon	150 cm	61.4 kg	9 years	Also established in New Zealand
North Pacific	Both sides	Chum salmon	100 cm	15.9 kg	7 years	
North Pacific	Both sides	Coho salmon	108 cm	15.2 kg	5 years	
North Pacific	Both sides	Pink salmon	76 cm	6.8 kg	3 years	
North Pacific	Both sides	Sockeye salmon	84 cm	7.7 kg	8 years	
North Pacific	Asian side	Masu salmon	79 cm	10.0 kg		
North Pacific	Asian side	Biwa salmon	44 cm	1.3 kg		

The life cycle of an anadromous salmon begins and, if it survives the full course of its natural life, usually ends in a gravel bed in the upper reaches of a stream or river. These are the salmon spawning grounds where salmon eggs are deposited, for safety, in the gravel. The salmon spawning grounds are also the salmon nurseries, providing a more protected environment than the ocean usually offers. After 2 to 6 months the eggs hatch into tiny larvae called sac fry or alevin. The alevin have a sac containing the remainder of the yolk, and they stay hidden in the gravel while they feed on the yolk. When the yolk has gone they must find food for themselves, so they leave the protection of the gravel and start feeding on plankton. At this point the baby salmon are called fry. At the end of the summer the fry develop into juvenile fish called parr. Parr feed on small invertebrates and are camouflaged with a pattern of spots and vertical bars. They remain in this stage for up to three years.

As they approach the time when they are ready to migrate out to the sea the parr lose their camouflage bars and undergo a process of physiological changes which allows them to survive the shift from freshwater to saltwater. At this point salmon are called smolt. Smolt spend time in the brackish waters of the river estuary while their body chemistry adjusts their osmoregulation to cope with the higher salt levels they will encounter in the ocean. Smolt also grow the silvery scales which visually confuse ocean predators. When they have matured sufficiently in late spring, and are about 15 to 20 centimetres long, the smolt swim out of the rivers and into the sea. There they spend their first year as a post-smolt. Post-smolt form schools with other post-smolt, and set off to find deep-sea feeding grounds. They then spend up to four more years as adult ocean salmon while their full swimming ability and reproductive capacity develop.

Then, in one of the animal kingdom's more extreme migrations, the salmon return from the saltwater ocean back to a freshwater river to spawn afresh.

== Return from the ocean ==
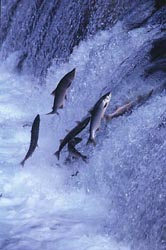
Salmon jumping a fall

After several years wandering huge distances in the ocean, most salmon return to the natal rivers where they were spawned. Then most of them swim up the rivers until they reach the very spawning ground that was their original birthplace.

There are various theories about how this happens. One theory is that there are geomagnetic and chemical cues which the salmon use to guide them back to their birthplace. The fish may be sensitive to the Earth's magnetic field, which could allow the fish to orient itself in the ocean, so it can navigate back to the estuary of its natal stream.

Salmon have a strong sense of smell. Speculation about whether odours provide homing cues go back to the 19th century. In 1951, Hasler hypothesised that, once in vicinity of the estuary or entrance to its birth river, salmon may use chemical cues which they can smell, and which are unique to their natal stream, as a mechanism to home onto the entrance of the stream. In 1978, Hasler and his students found that the way salmon locate their home rivers with such precision was because they could recognise its characteristic smell. They further demonstrated that the smell of their river becomes imprinted in salmon when they transform into smolts, just before they migrate out to sea. Homecoming salmon can also recognise characteristic smells in tributary streams as they move up the main river. They may also be sensitive to characteristic pheromones given off by juvenile conspecifics. There is evidence that they can "discriminate between two populations of their own species".

The recognition that each river and tributary has its own characteristic smell, and the role this plays as a navigation aid, led to a widespread search for a mechanism or mechanisms that might allow salmon to navigate over long distances in the open ocean. In 1977, Leggett identified, as mechanisms worth investigating, the use of the sun for navigation, and orientation to various possible gradients, such as temperature, salinity or chemicals gradients, or geomagnetic or geoelectric fields.

There is little evidence salmon use clues from the sun for navigation. Migrating salmon have been observed maintaining direction at nighttime and when it is cloudy. Likewise, electronically tagged salmon were observed to maintain direction even when swimming in water much too deep for sunlight to be of use.

In 1973, it was shown that Atlantic salmon have conditioned cardiac responses to electric fields with strengths similar to those found in oceans. "This sensitivity might allow a migrating fish to align itself upstream or downstream in an ocean current in the absence of fixed references." In 1988, researchers found iron, in the form of single domain magnetite, resides in the skulls of sockeye salmon. The quantities present are sufficient for magnetoception.

Tagging studies have shown a small number of fish do not find their natal rivers, but travel instead up other, usually nearby streams or rivers. It is important some salmon stray from their home areas; otherwise new habitats could not be colonized. In 1984, Quinn hypothesized there is a dynamic equilibrium, controlled by genes, between homing and straying. If the spawning grounds have a uniform high quality, then natural selection should favour the descendants that home accurately. If the spawning grounds have a variable quality, then natural selection should favour a mixture of the descendants that stray and the descendants that home accurately.

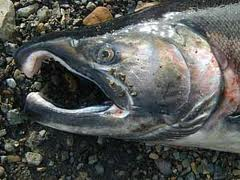
The kype of a spawning male salmon

Prior to the run up the river, the salmon undergo profound physiological changes. Fish swim by contracting longitudinal red muscle and obliquely oriented white muscles. Red muscles are used for sustained activity, such as ocean migrations. White muscles are used for bursts of activity, such as bursts of speed or jumping. As the salmon comes to end of its ocean migration and enters the estuary of its natal river, its energy metabolism is faced with two major challenges: it must supply energy suitable for swimming the river rapids, and it must supply the sperm and eggs required for the reproductive events ahead. The water in the estuary receives the freshwater discharge from the natal river. Relative to ocean water, this has a high chemical load from surface runoff. Researchers in 2009 found evidence that, as the salmon encounter the resulting drop in salinity and increase in olfactory stimulation, two key metabolic changes are triggered: there is a switch from using red muscles for swimming to using white muscles, and there is an increase in the sperm and egg load. "Pheromones at the spawning grounds [trigger] a second shift to further enhance reproductive loading."

The salmon also undergo radical morphological changes as they prepare for the spawning event ahead. All salmon lose the silvery blue they had as ocean fish, and their colour darkens, sometimes with a radical change in hue. Salmon are sexually dimorphic, and the male salmon develop canine-like teeth and their jaws develop a pronounced curve or hook (kype). Some species of male salmon grow large humps.

== Obstacles ==
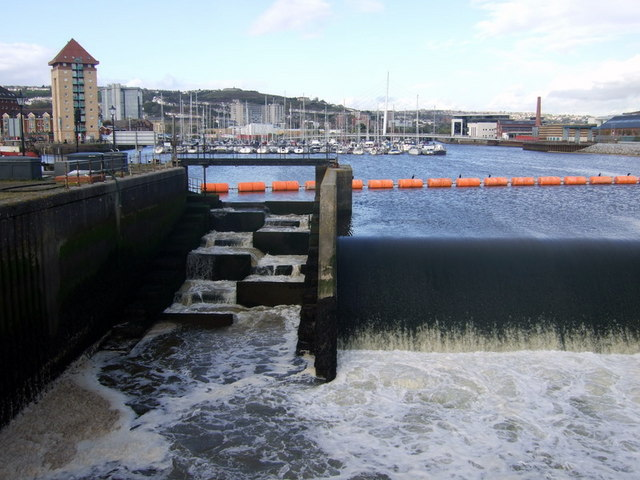
A fish ladder makes it easier for salmon to negotiate a weir.

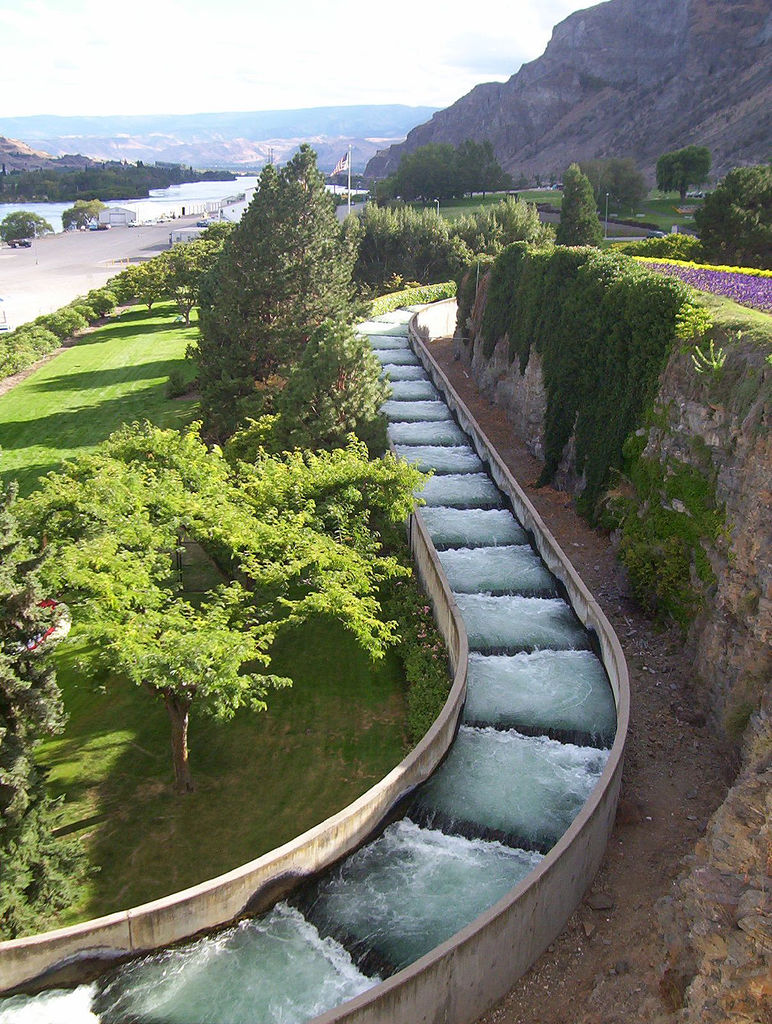
An extended bypass

Salmon start the run in peak condition, the culmination of years of development in the ocean. They need to be in peak condition for the long distance swimming and leaping abilities needed to battle the rapids and other obstacles the river may present, and they need to have reached full sexual maturity to ensure a successful spawn at the end of the run. All of their energy goes into the physical rigours of the journey and the morphological transformation they must still complete before they are ready for the spawning events ahead.

The run up the river can be exhausting, sometimes requiring the salmon to battle hundreds of miles upstream against strong currents and rapids. They cease feeding during the run. Chinook and sockeye salmon from central Idaho must travel 900 miles (1,400 km) and climb nearly 7,000 feet (2,100 m) before they are ready to spawn. Salmon deaths that occur on the upriver journey are referred to as en route mortality.

Salmon negotiate waterfalls and rapids by leaping or jumping. They have been recorded making vertical jumps as high as 3.65 metres (12 ft). The height that can be achieved by a salmon depends on the position of the standing wave or hydraulic jump at the base of the fall, as well as how deep the water is.

Fish ladders, or fishways, are specially designed to help salmon and other fish to bypass dams and other man-made obstructions, and continue on to their spawning grounds further upriver. Data suggest that navigation locks have a potential to be operated as vertical slot fishways to provide increased access for a range of biota, including poor swimmers.

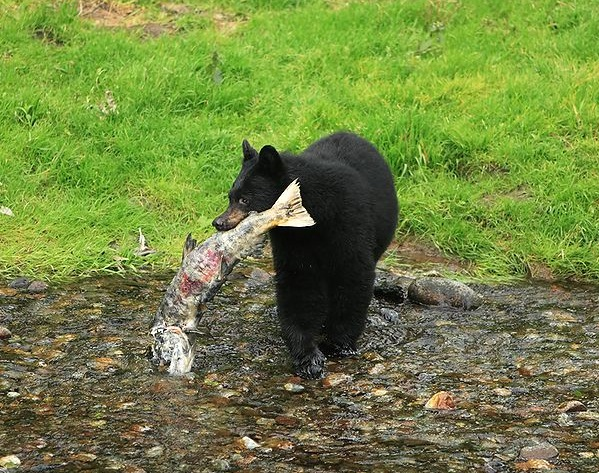
The black fur of black bears is easily spotted by salmon in daylight, and the bears fish more successfully using auditory clues at night.

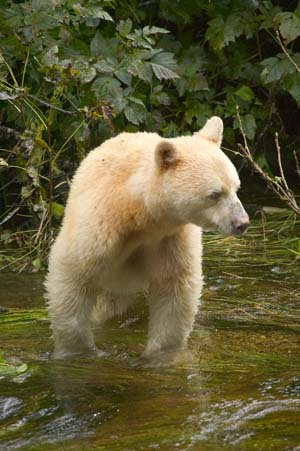
White-coated Kermode bears have more success fishing in daylight.

Skilled predators, such as bears, bald eagles and fishermen can await the salmon during the run. Normally solitary animals, grizzly bears congregate by streams and rivers when the salmon spawn. Predation from harbor seals, California sea lions, and Steller sea lions can pose a significant threat, even in river ecosystems.

Black bears also fish the salmon. Black bears usually operate during the day, but when it comes to salmon they tend to fish at night. This is partly to avoid competition with the more powerful brown bears, but it is also because they catch more salmon at night. During the day, salmon are very evasive and attuned to visual clues, but at night they focus on their spawning activities, generating acoustic clues the bears tune into. Black bears may also fish for salmon during the night because their black fur is easily spotted by salmon in the daytime. In 2009, researchers compared the foraging success of black bears with the white-coated Kermode bear, a morphed subspecies of the black bear. They found the Kermode bear had no more success catching salmon at night time, but had greater success than the black bears during the day.

Otters are also common predators. In 2011, researchers showed that when otters predate salmon, the salmon can "sniff them out". They demonstrated that once otters have eaten salmon, the remaining salmon could detect and avoid the waters where otter faeces was present.

== Spawning ==
Salmon redds

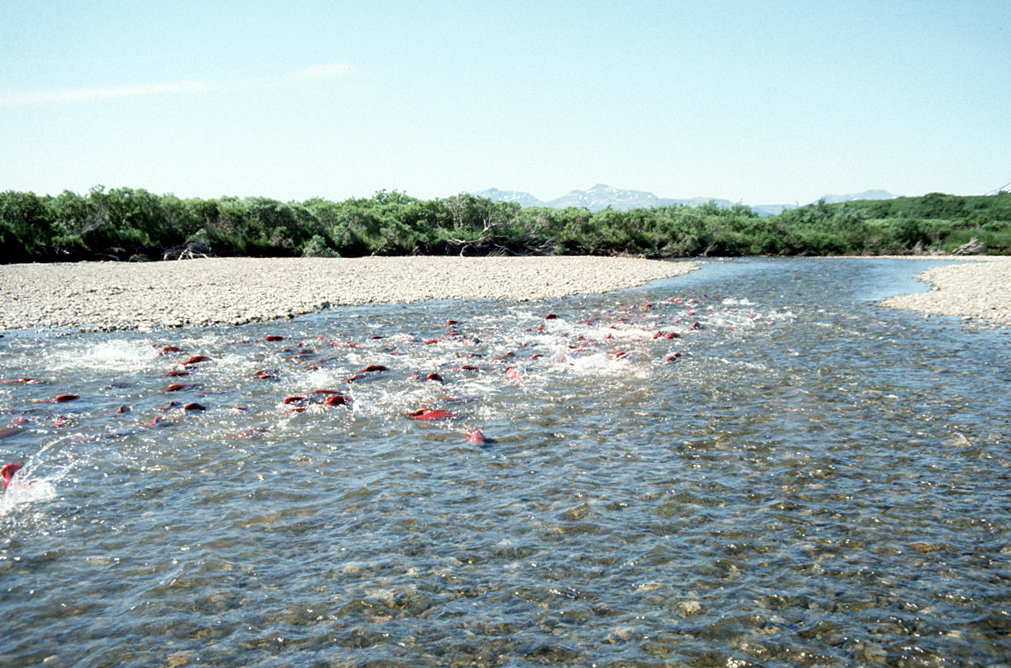
Spawning salmon building redds on a riffle

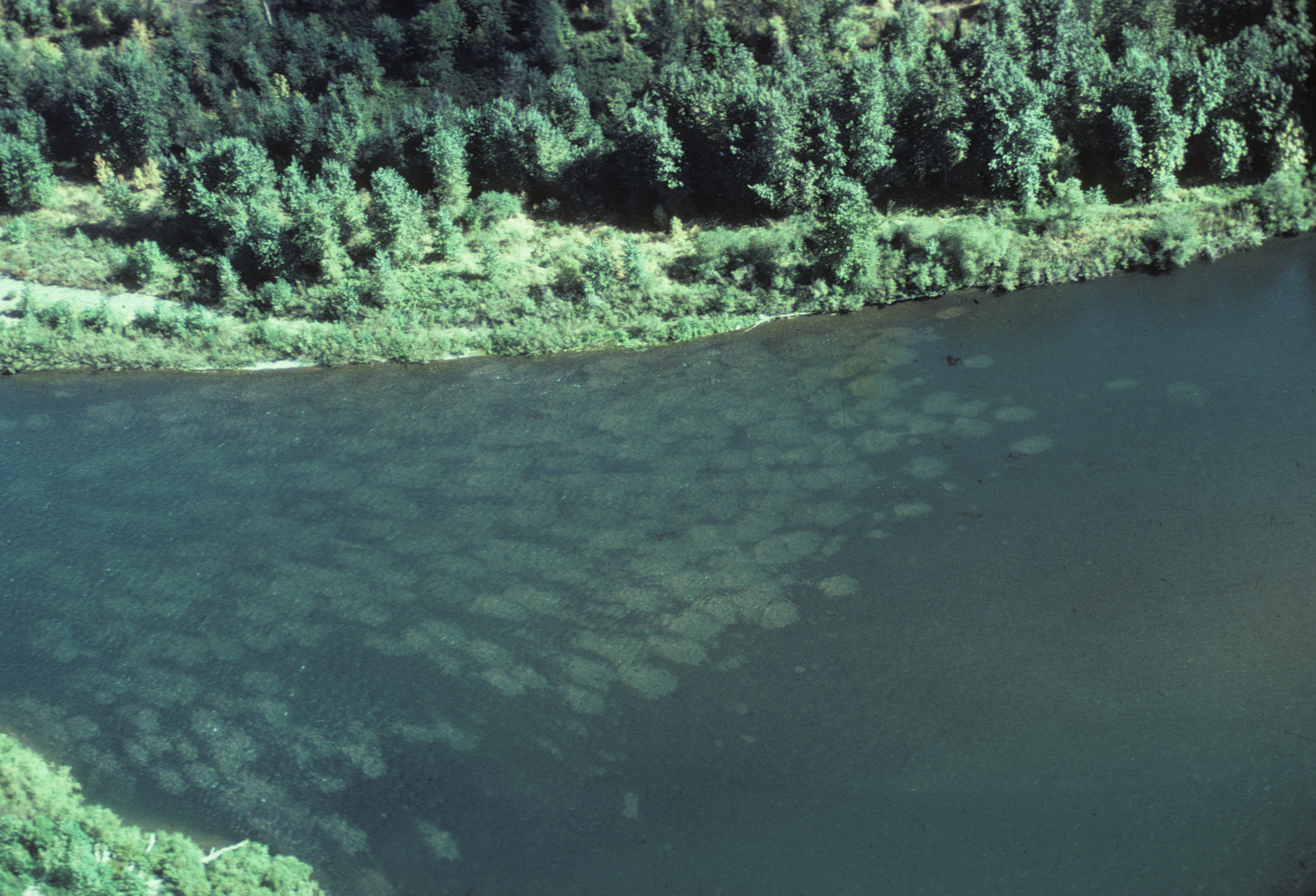
The white areas on the river bottom are completed redds.

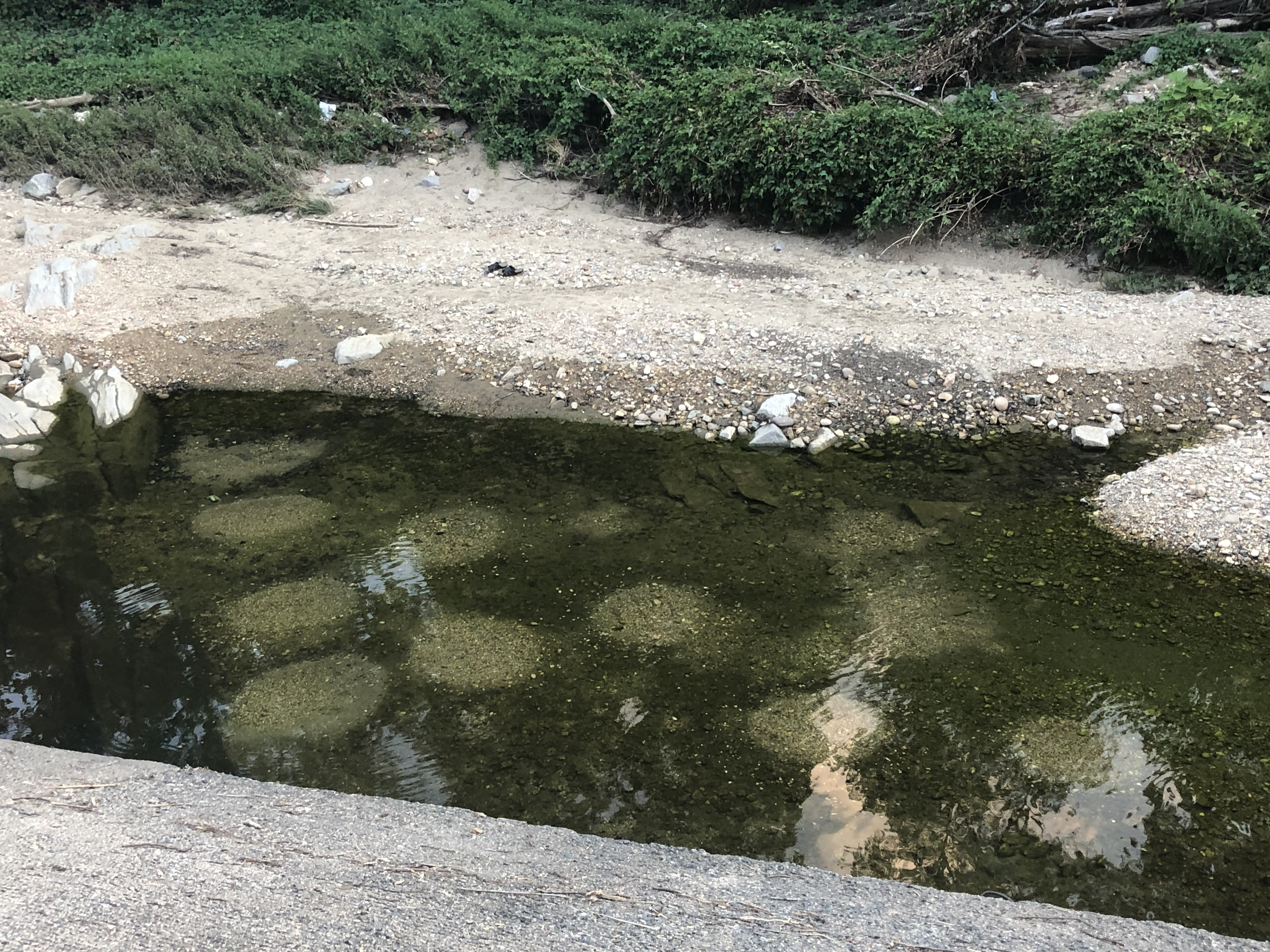
Closeup of redds on a riverbed

The term prespawn mortality is used to refer to fish that arrive successfully at the spawning grounds, and then die without spawning. Prespawn mortality is surprisingly variable, with one study observing rates between 3% and 90%. Factors that contribute to these mortalities include high temperatures, high river discharge rates, and parasites and diseases. "At present there are no reliable indicators to predict whether an individual arriving at a spawning area will in fact survive to spawn."

The eggs of a female salmon are called her roe. To lay her roe, the female salmon builds a spawning nest, called a redd, in a riffle with gravel as its streambed. A riffle is a relatively shallow length of stream where the water is turbulent and flows faster. She builds the redd by using her tail (caudal fin) to create a low-pressure zone, lifting gravel to be swept downstream, and excavating a shallow depression. The redd may contain up to 5,000 eggs, each about the size of a pea, covering 30 square feet (2.8 m^{2}). The eggs usually range from orange to red. One or more males will approach the female in her redd, depositing his sperm, or milt, over her eggs. The female then covers the eggs by disturbing the gravel at the upstream edge of the depression before moving on to make another redd. The female will make as many as seven redds before her supply of eggs is exhausted.

Male pink salmon and some sockeye salmon develop pronounced humps just before they spawn. These humps may have evolved because they confer species advantages. The humps make it less likely the salmon will spawn in the shallow water at margins of the streambed, which tend to dry out during low water flows or freeze in winter. Further, riffles can contain many salmon spawning simultaneously, as in the image on the right. Predators, such as bears, will be more likely to catch the more visually prominent humped males, with their humps projecting above the surface of the water. This may provide a protective buffer for the females.

Dominant male salmon defend their redds by rushing at and chasing intruders. They butt and bite them with the canine-like teeth they developed for the spawning event. The kypes are used to clamp around the base of the tail (caudal peduncle) of an opponent.

== Deterioration ==
The physical condition of the salmon deteriorates the longer they remain in fresh water. Once the salmon have spawned, most of them deteriorate rapidly (a.k.a. "spawned out") and soon die. Some deteriorating salmon are still alive, but their bodies have already begun the process of rotting, and these deteriorating salmon are sometimes colloquially called "zombie fish". This is because upstream freshwater bodies (especially creeks) typically do not have sufficient food available for the adult salmon diet, and they have used large amounts of energy swimming upriver, thus exhausting their own internal nutrient reserves. Spawning salmon also have programmed senescence, which is "characterized by immunosuppression and organ deterioration", making them more vulnerable to diseases. Most zombie fish die within days of spawning, but some can last up to a couple of weeks. Once the salmon die in the river, they are either scavenged by other animals, or they decompose and release inorganic nutrients to the plankton in the river and the riparian vegetation in the floodplain.

The Pacific salmon are a classic example of a semelparous animal, which reproduce only once in their lifetime. Semelparity is sometimes called "big bang" reproduction, since the single reproductive event of semelparous organisms is usually large and fatal to the spawners. It is an evolutionary strategy that concentrates all available resources into maximizing reproduction, at the expense of individual organism's life, which is common among insects but rare among vertebrates. All six species of Pacific salmons live for many years in the ocean before swimming to the freshwater stream of its birth, spawning, and then dying. Most Atlantic salmon also die after spawning, but about 5 to 10% (mostly female) return to the ocean where they can recover and spawn again the next season.

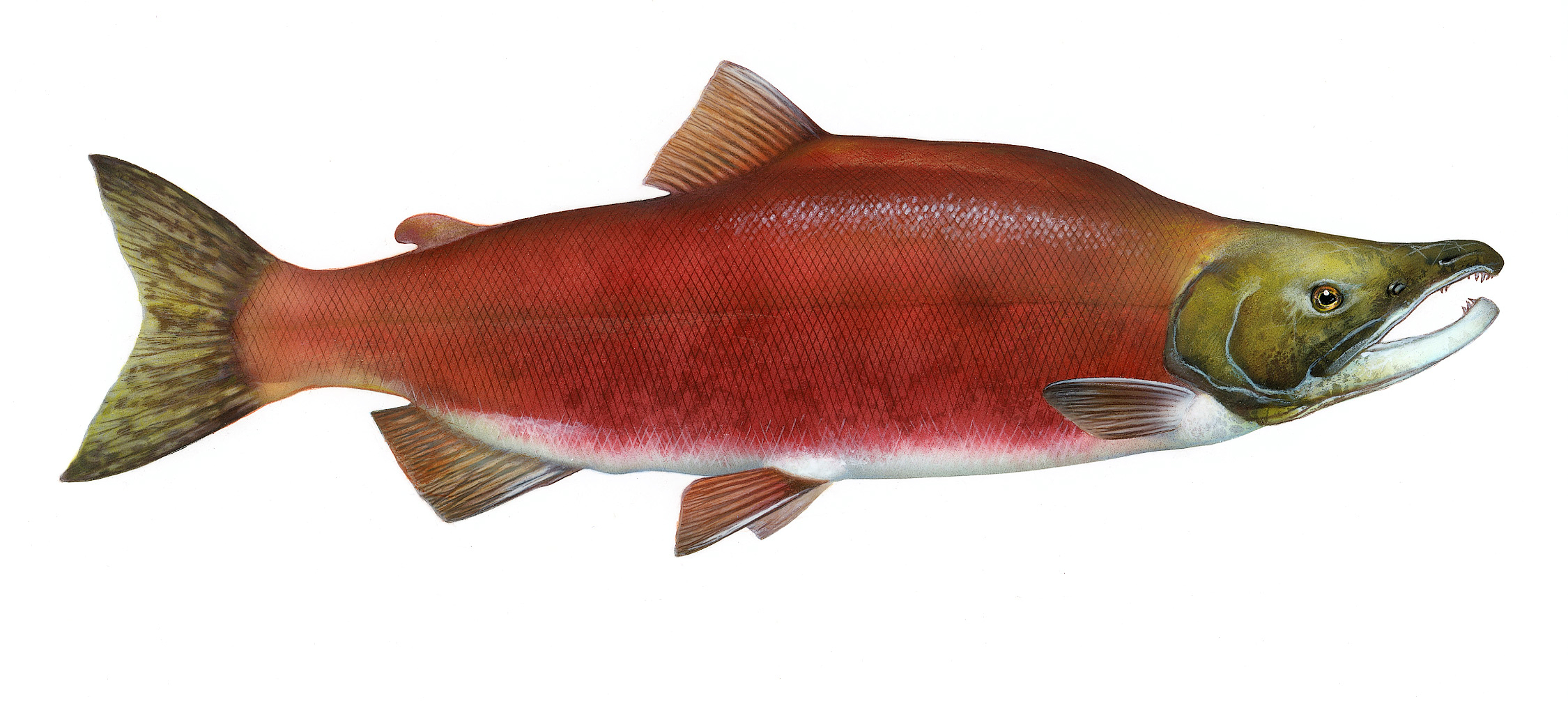
Spawning male sockeye salmon

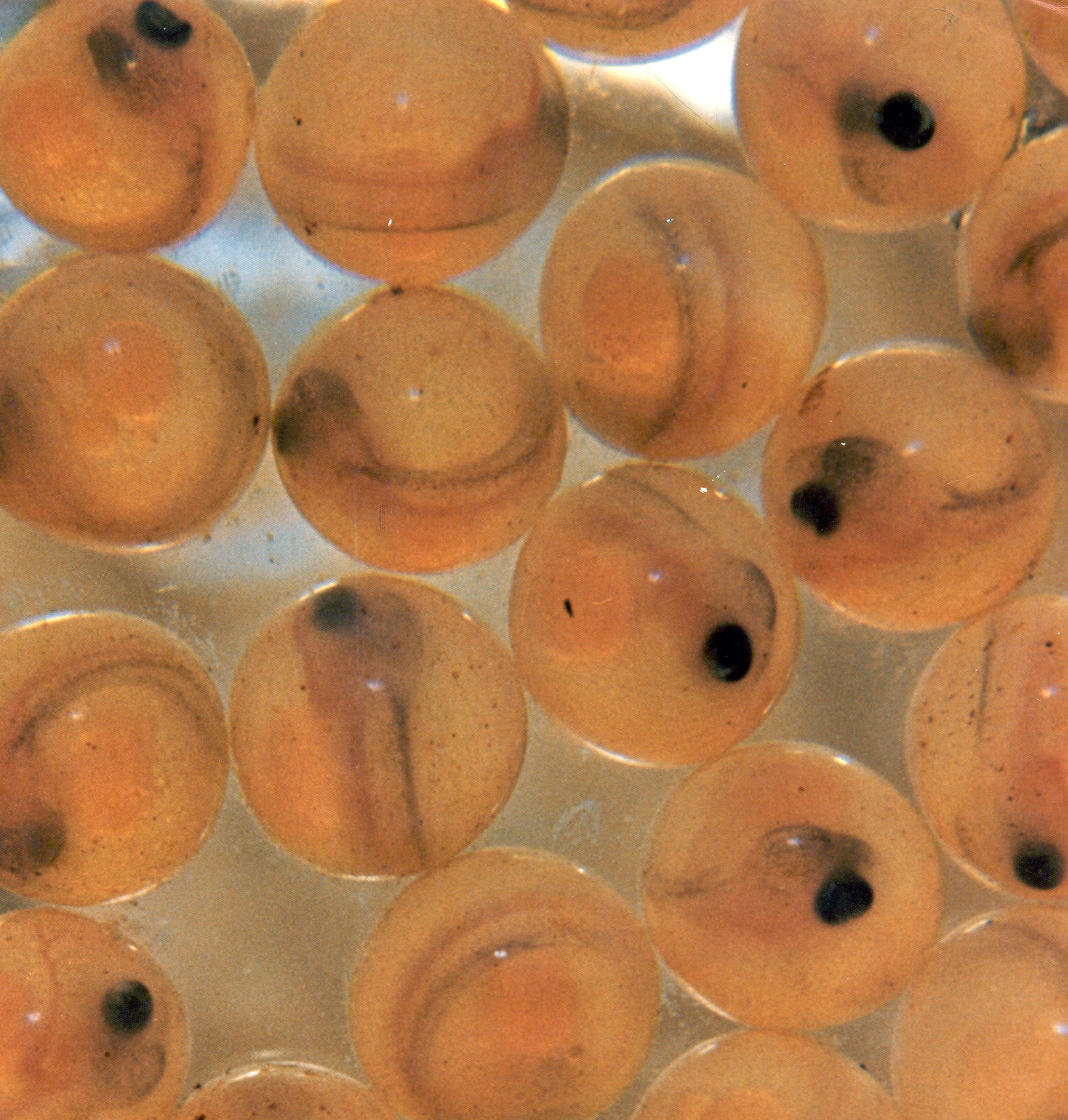
The pea-sized eggs are laid in redds.

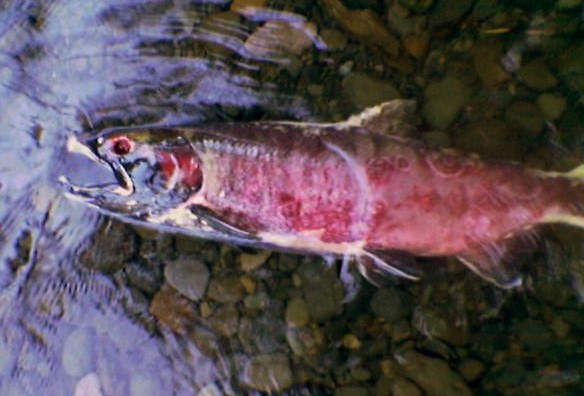
All Pacific salmon (pictured) and most Atlantic salmon die after spawning.

== Keystone species ==
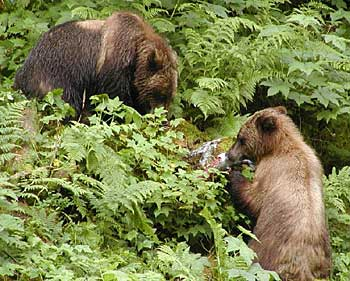
Grizzly bears tend to carry salmon carcasses into adjacent riparian areas.

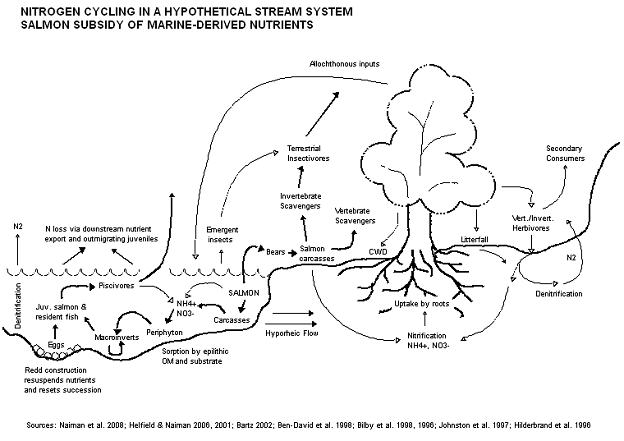
Salmon subsidy to the nitrogen cycle in a hypothetical stream system

In the Pacific Northwest and Alaska, salmon is a keystone species, supporting wildlife from birds to bears and otters. The bodies of salmon represent a transfer of nutrients from the ocean, rich in nitrogen, sulfur, carbon and phosphorus, to the forest ecosystem.

Grizzly bears function as ecosystem engineers, capturing salmon and carrying them into adjacent wooded areas. There they deposit nutrient-rich urine and feces and partially eaten carcasses. It has been estimated that bears leave up to half the salmon they harvest on the forest floor, in densities that can reach 4,000 kilograms per hectare, providing as much as 24% of the total nitrogen available to the riparian woodlands. The foliage of spruce trees up to 500 m (1,600 ft) from a stream where grizzlies fish salmon have been found to contain nitrogen originating from fished salmon.

Salmon continue to surprise us, showing us new ways in which their oceanic migrations eventually permeate entire terrestrial ecosystems. In terms of providing food and nutrients to a whole food web, we like to think of them as North America's answer to the Serengeti's wildebeest.

Wolves normally hunt for deer. A 2008 study suggests that when the salmon run starts, wolves choose to fish for salmon, even if plenty of deer are still available. "Selecting benign prey such as salmon makes sense from a safety point of view. While hunting deer, wolves commonly incur serious and often fatal injuries. In addition to safety benefits we determined that salmon also provides enhanced nutrition in terms of fat and energy."

The upper reaches of the Chilkat River in Alaska has particularly good spawning grounds. Each year these attract a run of up to half a million chum salmon. As the salmon run up the river, bald eagles arrive in their thousands to feast at the spawning grounds. This results in some of the world's largest congregations of bald eagles. The number of participating eagles is directly correlated with the number of spawning salmon.

Residual nutrients from salmon can also accumulate downstream in estuaries. A 2010 study suggests the density and diversity of many estuarine breeding birds in the summer "were strongly predicted by salmon biomass in the autumn". Anadromous salmon provide nutrients to these "diverse assemblages ... ecologically comparable to the migrating herds of wildebeest in the Serengeti".

== Prospects ==
In 1997, researchers noted that the future of salmon runs worldwide would depend on many factors, most of which are driven by human actions. Among the key driving factors are (1) harvest of salmon by commercial, recreational, and subsistence fishing, (2) alterations in stream and river channels, including construction of dikes and other riparian corridor modifications, (3) electricity generation, flood control, and irrigation supplied by dams, (4) alteration by humans of freshwater, estuarine, and marine environments used by salmon, coupled with aquatic changes due to climate and ocean circulatory regimes, (5) water withdrawals from rivers and reservoirs for agricultural, municipal, or commercial purposes, (6) changes in climate caused at least in part by human activities, (7) competition from non-native fishes, (8) salmon predation by marine mammals, birds, and other fish species, (9) diseases and parasites, including those from outside the native region, and (10) reduced nutrient replenishment from decomposing salmon.

In 2009, NOAA advised that continued runoff into North American rivers of three widely used pesticides containing neurotoxins would "jeopardize the continued existence" of endangered and threatened Pacific salmon. Global warming could see the end of some salmon runs by the end of the century, such as the Californian runs of Chinook salmon. A 2010 United Nations report said that increases in acidification of oceans would mean that shellfish such as Pteropods, an important component of the ocean salmon diet, would be finding it more difficult to build their aragonite shells. There were concerns that this too could endanger future salmon runs.

== In popular culture ==
In a 1982 video game called Salmon Run, the player takes the role of Sam the Salmon, swimming upriver to mate. Along the way he encounters waterfalls, a bear, fishermen, and seagulls.

In the 2003 Disney animated feature film, Brother Bear, the protagonist Kenai adjusts to his life as a bear during the annual salmon run.

Splatoon 2 and 3 introduces the game mode "Salmon Run" where players fight off fictional Salmonids, a race of salmon-like beings. Grizzco Industries, owned by Mr. Grizz, employs players to hunt for salmonids and their eggs, similar to Grizzly bears hunting salmon in nature. The game's lore suggests that the Salmonids participate in a massive salmon migration every 70 years, which coincides with the time the Splatoon series takes place.

The 2023 eco fantasy film Wild Summon depicts salmon as miniature aquatic humanlike free divers throughout their life cycle and migrations.

== Notable runs ==
External videos
- Grizzly Bears Catching Salmon on YouTube – Nature's Great Events: The Great Salmon Run
- Bald Eagle catches salmon on YouTube – BBC Nature's Great Events - The Great Salmon Run
- The Great Salmon Run on YouTube – BBC Nature's Great Events
- Nimbus Hatchery Fish Ladder on YouTube
- Life Cycle of Salmon on YouTube
- Life Cycle of Salmon on YouTube – Discovery Channel
- The Salmon's Lifecycle Atlantic Salmon Trust
- Sockeye Salmon Run 2010 on YouTube
- Spawning salmon constructing a redd on YouTube
- Raising salmon on YouTube
- Salmon life cycle song on YouTube

- Adams River (British Columbia)
- Anan Creek (Alaska)
- Bristol Bay (Alaska)
- Chilkat River (Alaska)
- Columbia River (British Columbia, United States)
- Copper River (Alaska)
- Fraser River (British Columbia)
- Kenai River (Alaska)
- River Spey (Scotland)
- River Tana (Norway, Finland)
- River Tay (Scotland)
- River Tweed (border of Scotland and England)
- River Tyne (England)
- Snake River (United States)
- Yukon River (Alaska, Yukon, British Columbia)

== See also ==
- Salmonidae
- Animal navigation
- Environmental impact of reservoirs
- June hogs
- Natal homing
- Olfactory navigation
- Pre-spawn mortality in coho salmon
- Sardine run

== Cited sources ==
- Moyle PB, Cech JJ (2004). Fishes, An Introduction to Ichthyology (5th ed.). Benjamin Cummings. ISBN 978-0-13-100847-2.
