= Qikiqtaryuaq (Bathurst Inlet) =

Island in Bathurst Inlet in Nunavut, Canada

- Location within Nunavut Location within Canada

Geography
- Location: Bathurst Inlet
- Coordinates: 67°55′34″N 108°07′16″W
- Archipelago: Arctic Archipelago

Administration
- Canada
- Territory: Nunavut
- Region: Kitikmeot

Demographics
- Population: Uninhabited

Qikiqtaryuaq, formerly Fishers Island, is an uninhabited island within the Arctic Archipelago in the Kitikmeot Region, Nunavut. It is located in Bathurst Inlet. Other islands in the vicinity include Iqalulialuk, Qannuyak, Patsy Klengenberg Island, Iglorua Island, and Walrus Island.
