= Walrus Island (Kiluhiqtuq) =

Island in Nunavut, Canada

Walrus
- Location within Nunavut Location within Canada

Geography
- Location: Bathurst Inlet
- Coordinates: 67°50′N 108°42′W
- Archipelago: Arctic Archipelago

Administration
- Canada
- Territory: Nunavut
- Region: Kitikmeot

Demographics
- Population: 0

Walrus Island is an uninhabited island within the Arctic Archipelago in the Kitikmeot Region, Nunavut. It is located in Kiluhiqtuq, formerly Bathurst Inlet. Other islands in the vicinity include Ekalulia Island, Lewes Island, Patsy Klengenberg Island, Galena Island, Iglorua Island, Marcet Island, and Fishers Island.
