= Igluhugyuk =

Island in Nunavut, Canada

- Location within Nunavut Location within Canada

Geography
- Location: Bathurst Inlet
- Coordinates: 67°37′18″N 108°22′31″W
- Archipelago: Arctic Archipelago

Administration
- Canada
- Territory: Nunavut
- Region: Kitikmeot

Demographics
- Population: Uninhabited

Igluhugyuk formerly Iglorua Island is an uninhabited island within the Arctic Archipelago in the Kitikmeot Region, Nunavut. It is located in Bathurst Inlet. Other islands in the vicinity include Algaq, Kanuyak Island, Iqalulialuk, Shoe Island, Walrus Island, Marcet Island, and Qikiqtaryuaq.
