= Barry Island (disambiguation) =

Barry Island is in Wales.

Barry Island may also refer to:

- Barry Island (Debenham Islands), Antarctica
- Barry Island (holiday camp), Wales

== See also ==
- Barry Islands, Canadian Arctic Archipelago
