= Qannuyak =

Island in Nunavut, Canada

- Location within Nunavut Location within Canada

Geography
- Location: Bathurst Inlet
- Coordinates: 67°56′09″N 109°00′36″W
- Archipelago: Arctic Archipelago

Administration
- Canada
- Territory: Nunavut
- Region: Kitikmeot

Demographics
- Population: Uninhabited

Qannuyak formerly Lewes Island is an uninhabited island within the Arctic Archipelago in the Kitikmeot Region, Nunavut. It is located in Bathurst Inlet. Other islands in the vicinity include Qikiqtaryuaq, Galena Island, Marcet Island, Patsy Klengenberg Island, and Walrus Island.
