= Algaq =

Island in Nunavut, Canada

Geography
- Location: Bathurst Inlet
- Coordinates: 67°30′37″N 108°22′30″W
- Archipelago: Barry Islands, Arctic Archipelago

Administration
- Canada
- Territory: Nunavut
- Region: Kitikmeot

Demographics
- Population: Uninhabited

Algaq formerly Algak Island is a member of the Barry Islands within the Arctic Archipelago in the Kitikmeot Region, Nunavut. It is located in Bathurst Inlet. Other islands in the vicinity include Iglorua Island, Ekalulia Island, Kanuyak Island, Shoe Island, and Aupilaktuq.
