= Wignick Island =

Island in Nunavut, Canada

Wignick
- Location within Nunavut Location within Canada

Geography
- Location: Bathurst Inlet
- Coordinates: 66°51′N 107°56′W
- Archipelago: Arctic Archipelago

Administration
- Canada
- Territory: Nunavut
- Region: Kitikmeot

Demographics
- Population: 0

Wignick Island is an uninhabited island within the Arctic Archipelago in the Kitikmeot Region, Nunavut. It is located in Bathurst Inlet. Other islands in the vicinity include Quadyuk Island and North Quadyuk Island.
