= Phenoptosis =

Death of an organism caused by its own genes

Phenoptosis (from pheno: showing or demonstrating; ptosis: programmed death, "falling off") is a conception of the self-programmed death of an organism proposed by Vladimir Skulachev in 1999.

In many species, including salmon and marsupial mice, under certain circumstances, especially following reproduction, an organism's genes will cause the organism to rapidly degenerate and die off. Recently this has been referred to as "fast phenoptosis" as aging is being explored as "slow phenoptosis". Phenoptosis is a common feature of living species, whose ramifications for humans is still being explored. The concept of programmed cell death was used before, by Lockshin & Williams in 1964 in relation to insect tissue development, around eight years before "apoptosis" was coined. The term 'phenoptosis' is a neologism associated with Skulachev's proposal.

== Evolutionary significance ==
In multicellular organisms, worn-out and ineffective cells are dismantled and recycled for the greater good of the whole organism in a process called apoptosis. It is believed that phenoptosis is an evolutionary mechanism that culls out the damaged, aged, infectious, or those in direct competition with their own offspring for the good of the species. Special circumstances need to exist for the "phenoptosis" strategy to be an evolutionarily stable strategy (ESS), let alone the only ESS. Examples of "phenoptosis" given below are really examples of semelpary - a life history with a single reproduction followed by death, which evolves not "for the good of the species" but as the ESS in the conditions of high adult-to-juvenile mortality ratio. The elimination of parts detrimental to the organism or individuals detrimental to the species has been deemed "The samurai law of biology" – it is better to die than to be wrong. Stress-induced, acute, or fast phenoptosis is the rapid deterioration of an organism induced by a life event such as breeding. Elimination of the parent provides space for fitter offspring. As a species this has been advantageous particularly to species that die immediately after spawning. Age-induced, soft, or slow phenoptosis is the slow deterioration and death of an organism due to accumulated stresses over long periods of time. In short, it has been proposed that aging, heart disease, cancer, and other age related ailments are means of phenoptosis. "Death caused by aging clears the population of ancestors and frees space for progeny carrying new useful traits." It has also been proposed that age provides a selective advantage to brains over brawn. An example made by V. P. Skulachev provides that of two hares, one faster and one smarter, the faster hare may have a selective advantage in youth but as aging occurs and muscles deteriorate it is the smarter hare that now has the selective advantage.

== Examples in nature ==
- E. coli – programmed death is initiated by infection by phage. This prevents further spread of phage to the remaining population.
- Saccharomyces cerevisiae – Under stress the yeast mitochondria produce reactive oxygen species ROS, leading to loss of membrane potential within the mitochondria and death of the cell.
- Amoeba Dictyostelium – Under stress amoeba form multicellular fruiting bodies. The better nourished cells differentiate into spores. The less healthy cells differentiate into the stalks of the fruiting body. After maturation of the spores, the stalk cells undergo phenoptosis.
- Nematode Caenorhabditis elegans – Under normal conditions Caenorhabditis elegans display a normal aging life cycle. However, if there is increased stress after breeding they undergo phenoptosis, like in yeast, induced by the mitochondria.
- Mayfly – Adult mayflies have no functional mouth and die from malnutrition.
- Mite Adactylidium – The initial food source of Adactylidium mite larvae is the body tissues of their mother resulting in her death.
- Squid – Some male squid die immediately after mating. This provides an abundant food source for those predators that would prey on the eggs.
- Marsupial mice – Males die two weeks after reproducing from an overabundance of their own pheromones.
- Salmon – Die soon after spawning.
- Septic shock – Severe infection by pathogens often results in death by sepsis. Sepsis, however, is not a result of toxins activated by the pathogen, rather it is directed by the organism itself. Similar to phenoptosis of E. coli, this has been suggested to be a means to separate dangerously infected individuals from healthy ones.

== Proposed mechanisms ==
Mitochondrial ROS – The production of ROS by the mitochondria. This causes oxidative damage to the inner compartment of the mitochondria and destruction of the mitochondria.

Clk1 gene – the gene thought to be responsible to aging due to mitochondrial ROS.

EF2 kinase – Blocks phosphorylation of elongation factor 2 thus blocking protein synthesis.

Glucocorticoid regulation – A common route for phenoptosis is breakdown of glucocorticoid regulation and inhibition, leading to massive excess of these corticosteroids in the body.

== Other examples ==
Robert Sapolsky discusses phenoptosis in his book Why Zebras Don't Get Ulcers, 3rd Ed., p. 245-247. He states that:

If you catch salmon right after they spawn... you find they have huge adrenal glands, peptic ulcers, and kidney lesions, their immune systems have collapsed... [and they] have stupendously high glucocorticoid concentrations in their bloodstreams. When salmon spawn, regulation of their glucocortocoid secretion breaks down... But is the glucocorticoid excess really responsible for their death? Yup. Take a salmon right after spawning, remove its adrenals, and it will live for a year afterward.

The bizarre thing is that this sequence... not only occurs in five species of salmon, but also among a dozen species of Australian marsupial mice... Pacific salmon and marsupial mice are not close relatives. At least twice in evolutionary history, completely independently, two very different sets of species have come up with the identical trick: if you want to degenerate very fast, secrete a ton of glucocorticoids.

== See also ==
- Evolution of ageing
- Sociobiology
- Survival of the fittest
