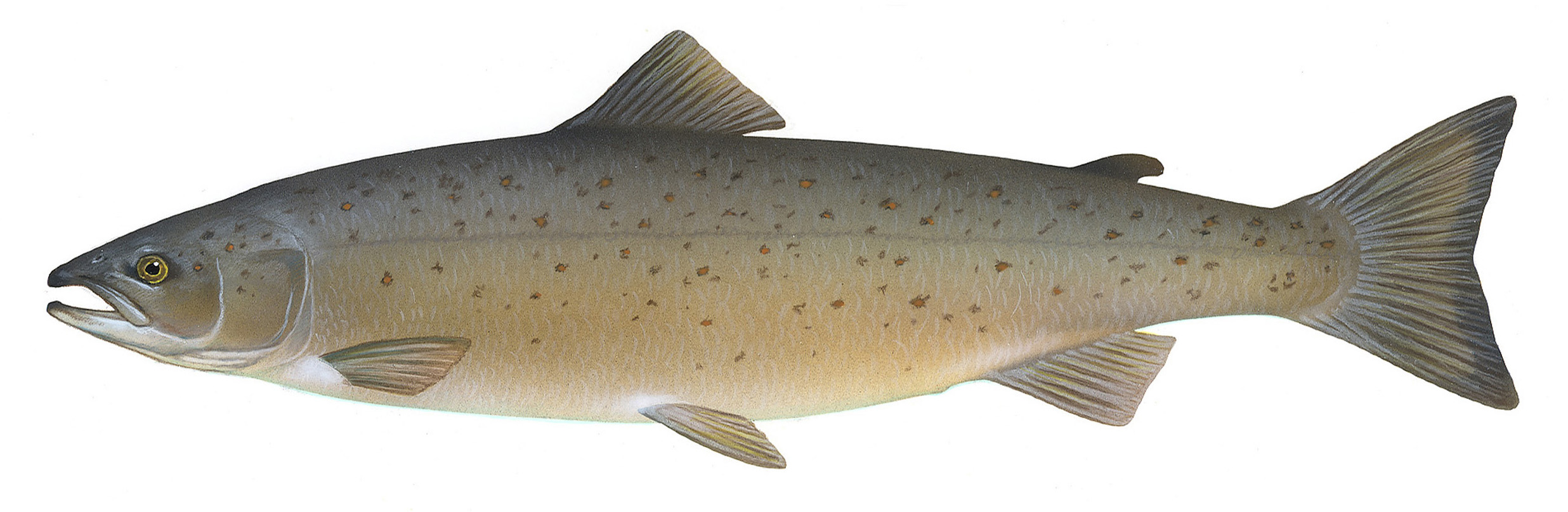
- Atlantic salmon, Salmo salar

Scientific classification
- Kingdom: Animalia
- Phylum: Chordata
- Class: Actinopterygii
- Division: Teleostei
- Order: Salmoniformes
- Family: Salmonidae
- Subfamily: Salmoninae

Groups included
- †Eosalmo driftwoodensis Wilson, 1977; Oncorhynchus gorbuscha (Walbaum, 1792); Oncorhynchus keta (Walbaum, 1792); Oncorhynchus kisutch (Walbaum, 1792); Oncorhynchus masou (Brevoort, 1856); Oncorhynchus nerka (Walbaum, 1792); Oncorhynchus tshawytscha (Walbaum, 1792); Salmo salar Linnaeus, 1758

Cladistically included but traditionally excluded taxa
- all other members of Salmoninae

= Salmon =

Commercially important migratory fish

Salmon (/ˈsæmən/; pl.: salmon) are any of several commercially important species of ray-finned fish that can live in either freshwater or saltwater from the genera Salmo and Oncorhynchus of the family Salmonidae, native to tributaries of the North Atlantic (Salmo) and North Pacific (Oncorhynchus) basins. Salmon is a colloquial or common name used for fish in this group, but is not a scientific name. Other closely related fish in the same family include trout, char, grayling, whitefish, lenok and taimen, all coldwater fish of the subarctic and cooler temperate regions with some sporadic endorheic populations in Central Asia.

Salmon are typically anadromous: they hatch in the shallow gravel beds of freshwater headstreams and spend their juvenile years in rivers, lakes and freshwater wetlands, migrate to the ocean as adults and live like sea fish, then return to their freshwater birthplace to reproduce. However, populations of several species are restricted to fresh waters (i.e. landlocked) throughout their lives. Folklore has it that the fish return to the exact stream where they themselves hatched to spawn, and tracking studies have shown this to be mostly true. A portion of a returning salmon run may stray and spawn in different freshwater systems; the percent of straying depends on the species of salmon. Homing behavior has been shown to depend on olfactory memory.

Salmon are important food fish and are intensively farmed in many parts of the world, with Norway being the world's largest producer of farmed salmon, followed by Chile. They are also highly prized game fish for recreational fishing, by both freshwater and saltwater anglers. Many species of salmon have since been introduced and naturalized into non-native environments such as the Great Lakes of North America, Patagonia in South America and South Island of New Zealand.

== Name and etymology ==
The Modern English term salmon is derived from Middle English: samoun, samon and saumon, which in turn are from Anglo-Norman: saumon, from Old French: saumon, and from Latin: salmō (which in turn might have originated from salire, meaning "to leap".). The unpronounced "l" absent from Middle English was later added as a Latinisation to make the word closer to its Latin root. The term salmon has mostly displaced its now dialectal synonym lax, in turn from Middle English: lax, from Old English: leax, from Proto-Germanic: *lahsaz from Proto-Indo-European: *lakso-.

== Species ==
The seven commercially important species of salmon occur in two genera of the subfamily Salmoninae. The genus Salmo contains the Atlantic salmon, found in both sides of the North Atlantic, as well as more than 40 other species commonly named as trout. The genus Oncorhynchus contains 12 recognised species which occur naturally only in the North Pacific, six of which are known as Pacific salmon while the remainder are considered trout. Outside their native habitats, Chinook salmon have been successfully introduced in New Zealand and Patagonia, while coho, sockeye and Atlantic salmon have been established in Patagonia, as well.

Atlantic and Pacific salmon
Genus	Image	Common name	Scientific name	Maximum length	Common length	Maximum weight	Maximum age	Trophic level	Fish Base	FAO	ITIS	IUCN status
Salmo (Atlantic salmon)		Atlantic salmon	Salmo salar Linnaeus, 1758	150 cm (4 ft 11 in)	120 cm (3 ft 11 in)	46.8 kilograms (103 lb)	13 years	4.4				Near threatened
Oncorhynchus (Pacific salmon)		Chinook salmon	Oncorhynchus tshawytscha (Walbaum, 1792)	150 cm (4 ft 11 in)	70 cm (2 ft 4 in)	61.4 kilograms (135 lb)	9 years	4.4				Least concern
Oncorhynchus (Pacific salmon)		Chum salmon	Oncorhynchus keta (Walbaum, 1792)	100 cm (3 ft 3 in)	58 cm (1 ft 11 in)	15.9 kilograms (35 lb)	7 years	3.5				Least concern
Oncorhynchus (Pacific salmon)		Coho salmon	Oncorhynchus kisutch (Walbaum, 1792)	108 cm (3 ft 7 in)	71 cm (2 ft 4 in)	15.2 kilograms (34 lb)	5 years	4.2				Least concern
Oncorhynchus (Pacific salmon)		Masu salmon	Oncorhynchus masou (Brevoort, 1856)	79 cm (2 ft 7 in)	50 cm (1 ft 8 in)	10.0 kilograms (22.0 lb)	3 years	3.6				Not assessed
Oncorhynchus (Pacific salmon)		Pink salmon	Oncorhynchus gorbuscha (Walbaum, 1792)	76 cm (2 ft 6 in)	50 cm (1 ft 8 in)	6.8 kilograms (15 lb)	3 years	4.2				Least concern
Oncorhynchus (Pacific salmon)		Sockeye salmon	Oncorhynchus nerka (Walbaum, 1792)	84 cm (2 ft 9 in)	58 cm (1 ft 11 in)	7.7 kilograms (17 lb)	8 years	3.7				Least concern

^{†} Both the Salmo and Oncorhynchus genera also contain a number of trout species informally referred to as salmon. Within Salmo, the Adriatic salmon (Salmo obtusirostris) and Black Sea salmon (Salmo labrax) have both been named as salmon in English, although they fall outside the generally recognized seven salmon species. The masu salmon (Oncorhynchus masou) is actually considered a trout ("cherry trout") in Japan, with masu actually being the Japanese word for trout. On the other hand, the steelhead and sea trout, the anadromous forms of rainbow trout and brown trout respectively, are from the same genera as salmon and live identical migratory lives, but neither is termed "salmon" .

The extinct Eosalmo driftwoodensis, the oldest known Salmoninae fish in the fossil record, helps scientists figure how the different species of salmon diverged from a common ancestor. The Eocene salmon's fossil from British Columbia provides evidence that the divergence between Pacific and Atlantic salmon had not yet occurred 40 million years ago. Both the fossil record and analysis of mitochondrial DNA suggest the divergence occurred 10 to 20 million years ago during the Miocene. This independent evidence from DNA analysis and the fossil record indicate that salmon divergence occurred long before the Quaternary glaciation began the cycle of glacial advance and retreat.

=== Non-salmon species of "salmon" ===
There are several other species of fish which are colloquially called "salmon" but are not true salmon. Of those listed below, the Danube salmon or huchen is a large freshwater salmonid closely related (from the same subfamily) to the seven species of salmon above, but others are fishes of unrelated orders, given the common name "salmon" simply due to similar shapes, behaviors and niches occupied:

Some other fishes called salmon
Common name	Scientific name	Order	Maximum length	Common length	Maximum weight	Maximum age	Trophic level	Fish Base	FAO	ITIS	IUCN status
Australian salmon	Arripis trutta (Forster, 1801)	Perciformes	89 cm (2 ft 11 in)	47 cm (1 ft 7 in)	9.4 kilograms (21 lb)	26 years	4.1				Not assessed
Danube salmon	Hucho hucho (Linnaeus, 1758)	Salmoniformes	150 cm (4 ft 11 in)	70 cm (2 ft 4 in)	52 kilograms (115 lb)	15 years	4.2				Endangered
Hawaiian salmon	Elagatis bipinnulata (Quoy & Gaimard, 1825)	Carangiformes	180 cm (5 ft 11 in)	90 cm (2 ft 11 in)	46.2 kilograms (102 lb)	6 years	3.6				Not assessed
Indian salmon	Eleutheronema tetradactylum (Shaw, 1804)	Perciformes	200 cm (6 ft 7 in)	50 cm (1 ft 8 in)	145 kilograms (320 lb)	years	4.4				Not assessed

== Distribution ==
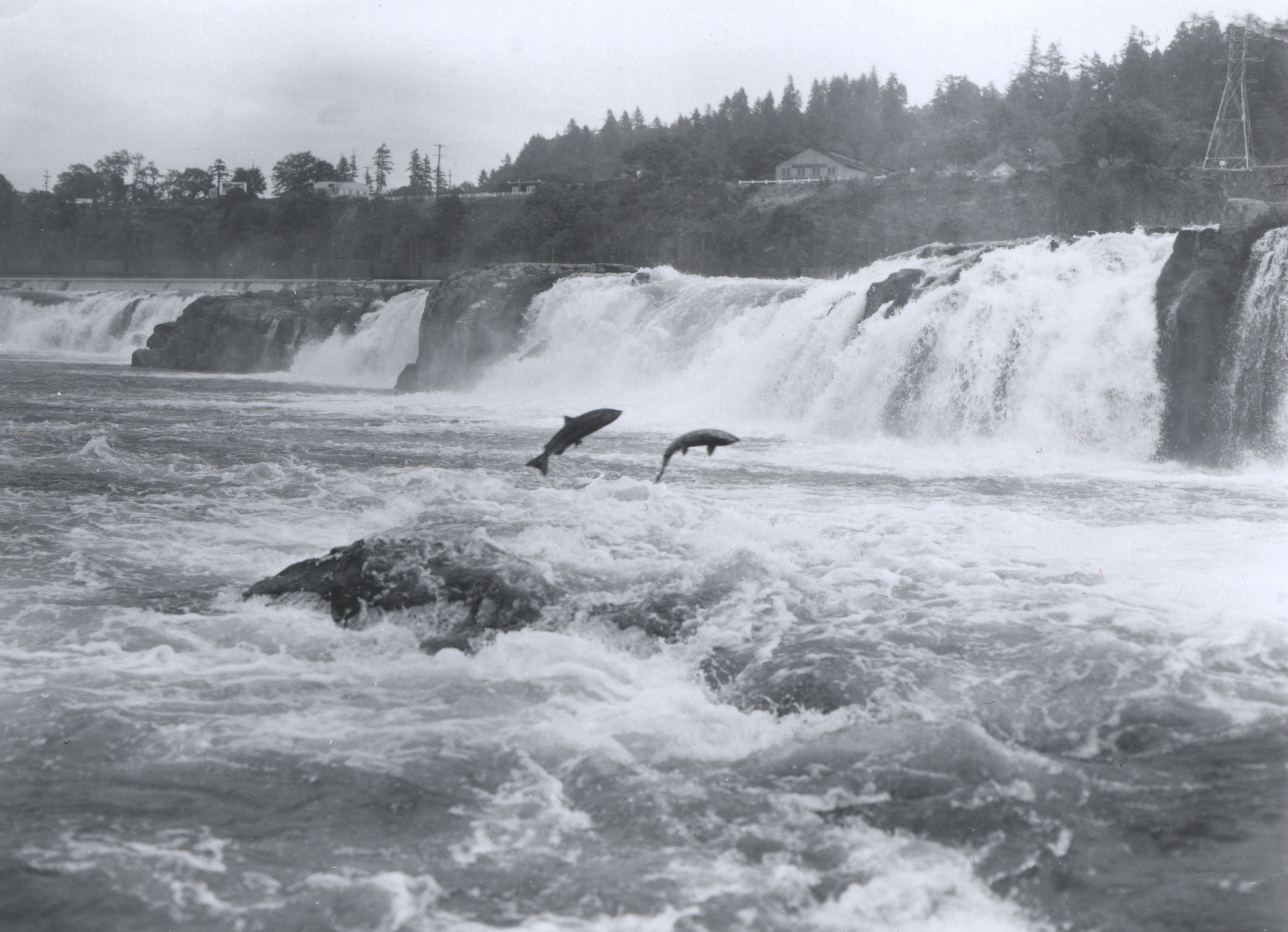
Pacific salmon leaping at Willamette Falls, Oregon

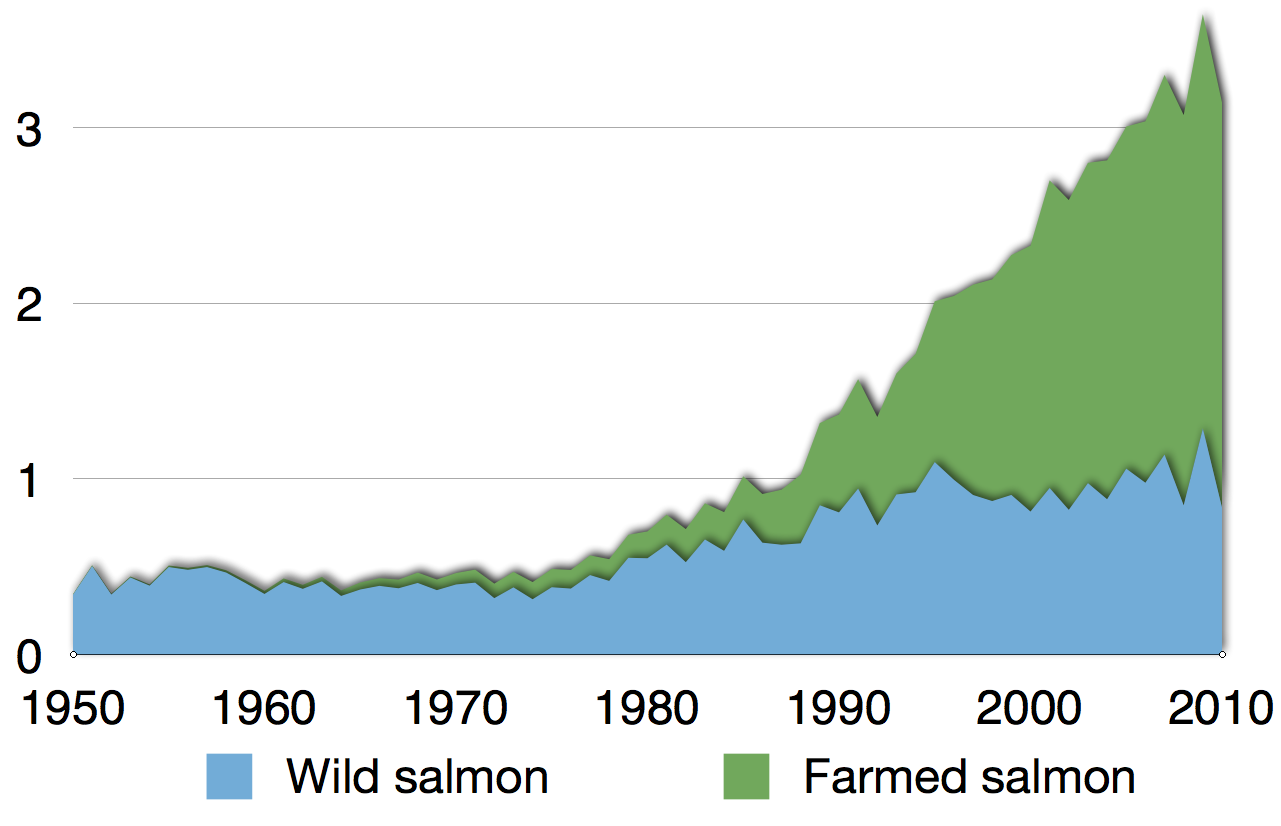
Commercial production of salmon in million tonnes 1950–2010

- Atlantic salmon (Salmo salar) reproduce in northern rivers on both coasts of the Atlantic Ocean.
  - Landlocked Atlantic salmon (Salmo salar m. sebago) is a potamodromous (migratory only between fresh waters) subspecies/morph that live in a number of lakes in eastern North America and in Northern Europe, for instance in lakes Sebago, Onega, Ladoga, Saimaa, Vänern and Winnipesaukee. They are not a different species from the sea-run Atlantic salmon but have independently evolved a freshwater-only life cycle, which they maintain even when they could access the ocean.
- Chinook salmon (Oncorhynchus tshawytscha) are also known in the United States as king salmon or "blackmouth salmon", and as "spring salmon" in British Columbia, Canada. Chinook salmon is the largest of all Pacific salmon, frequently exceeding 6 ft (1.8 m) and 14 kg (30 lb). The name tyee is also used in British Columbia to refer to Chinook salmon over 30 pounds and in the Columbia River watershed, especially large Chinooks were once referred to as June hogs. Chinook salmon are known to range as far north as the Mackenzie River and Kugluktuk in the central Canadian arctic, and as far south as the Central Californian Coast.
- Chum salmon (Oncorhynchus keta) is known as dog salmon or calico salmon in some parts of the US, and as keta in the Russian Far East. This species has the widest geographic range of the Pacific species: in the eastern Pacific from north of the Mackenzie River in Canada to south of the Sacramento River in California and in the western Pacific from Lena River in Siberia to the island of Kyūshū in the Sea of Japan.
- Coho salmon (Oncorhynchus kisutch) are also known in the US as silver salmon. This species is found throughout the coastal waters of Alaska and British Columbia and as far south as Central California (Monterey Bay). It is also now known to occur, albeit infrequently, in the Mackenzie River.
- Masu salmon (Oncorhynchus masou), also known as "cherry trout" (桜鱒 サクラマス, sakura masu) in Japan, are found only in the western Pacific Ocean in Japan, Korea, and Russian Far East. A landlocked subspecies known as the Taiwanese salmon or Formosan salmon (Oncorhynchus masou formosanus) is found in central Taiwan's Chi Chia Wan Stream.
- Pink salmon (Oncorhynchus gorbuscha), known as humpback salmon or "humpies" in southeast and southwest Alaska, are found in the western Pacific from Lena River in Siberia to Korea, found throughout northern Pacific, and in the eastern Pacific from the Mackenzie River in Canada to northern California, usually in shorter coastal streams. It is the smallest of the Pacific species, with an average weight of 1.6 to 1.8 kg (3.5 to 4.0 lb).
- Sockeye salmon (Oncorhynchus nerka) is also known as red salmon in the US (especially Alaska). This lake-rearing species is found in the eastern Pacific from Bathurst Inlet in the Canadian Arctic to Klamath River in California, and in the western Pacific from the Anadyr River in Siberia to northern Hokkaido island in Japan. Although most adult Pacific salmon feed on small fish, shrimp, and squid, sockeye feed on plankton they filter through gill rakers. Kokanee salmon are a landlocked form of sockeye salmon. Their appeal to sport fishermen has led to them being introduced to many places in the United States and Canada.
- Danube salmon, or huchen (Hucho hucho), are the largest permanent freshwater salmonid species.

== Life cycle ==
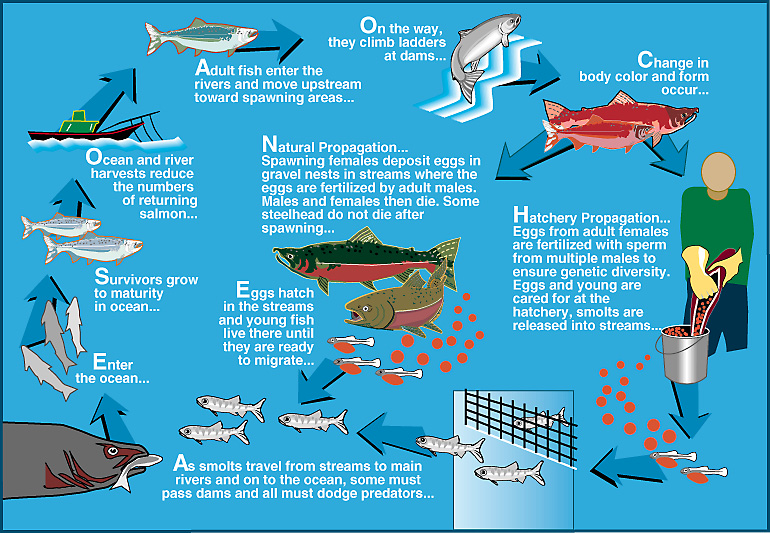
Life cycle of Pacific salmon

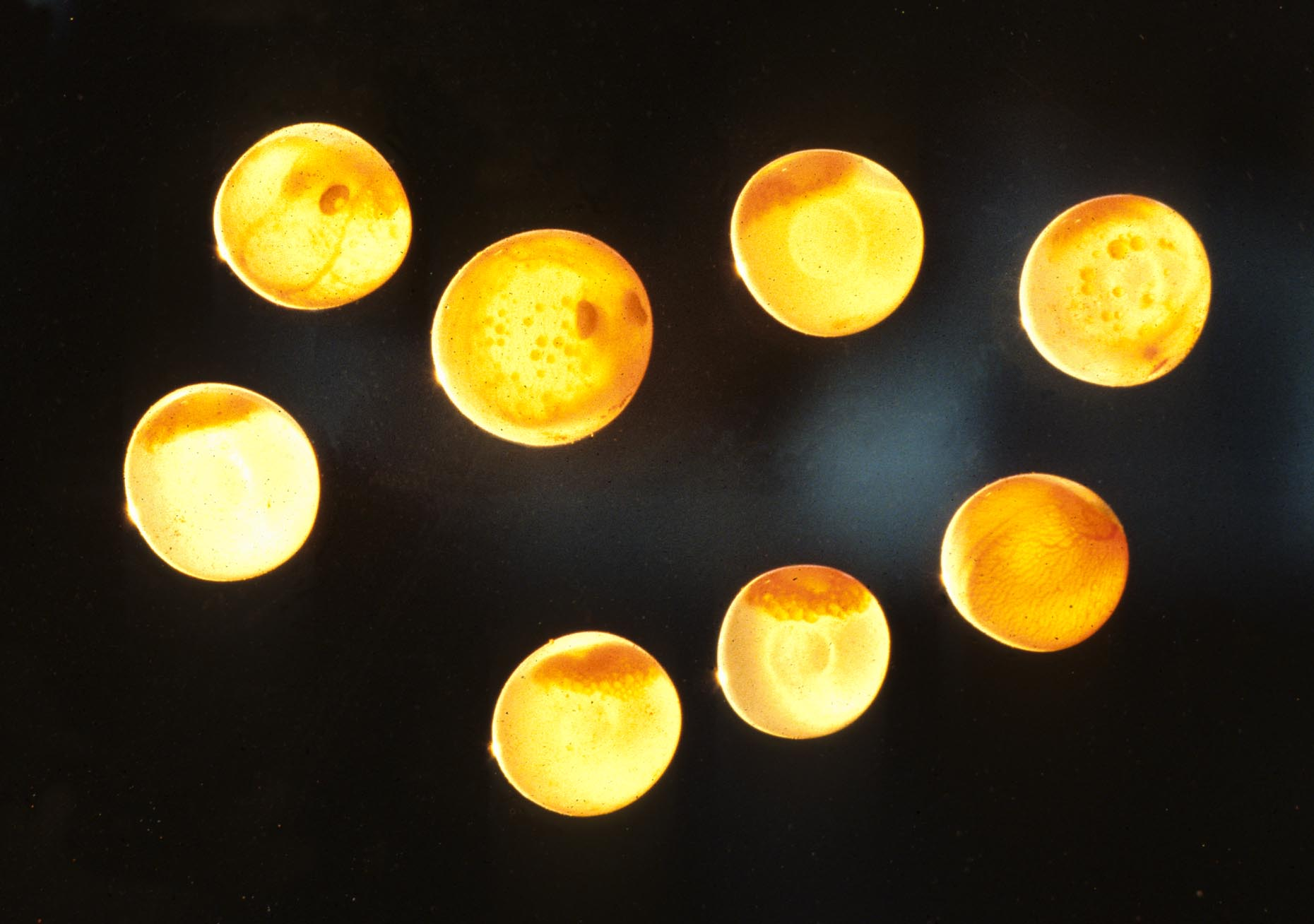
Eggs in different stages of development: In some, only a few cells grow on top of the yolk, in the lower right, the blood vessels surround the yolk, and in the upper left, the black eyes are visible, even the little lens.

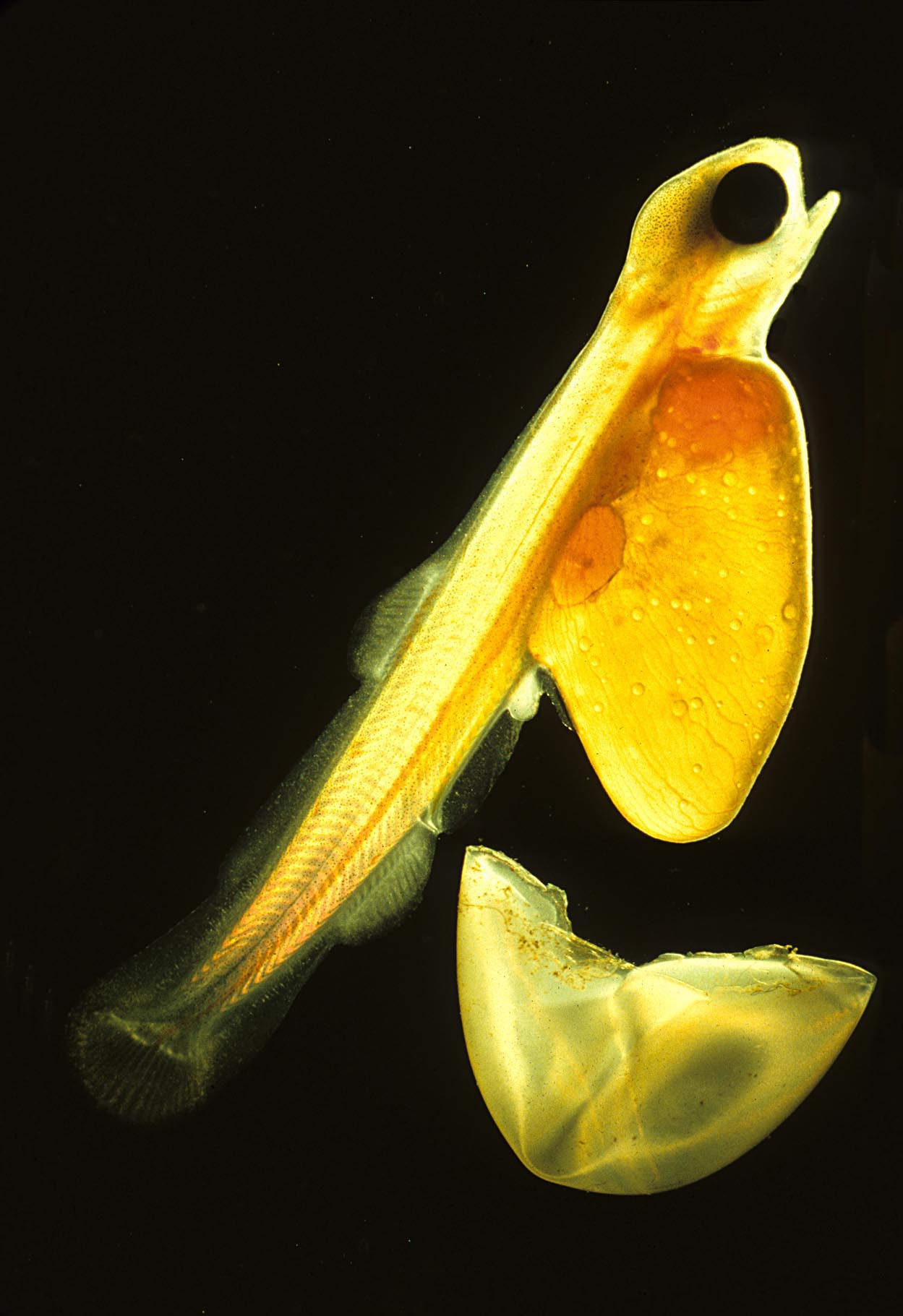
Salmon fry hatching—the baby has grown around the remains of the yolk—visible are the arteries spinning around the yolk and small oil drops, also the gut, the spine, the main caudal blood vessel, the bladder, and the arcs of the gills.

Salmon eggs are laid in freshwater streams typically at high latitudes. The eggs hatch into alevin or sac fry. The fry quickly develop into parr with camouflaging vertical stripes. The parr stay for six months to three years in their natal stream before becoming smolts, which are distinguished by their bright, silvery colour with scales that are easily rubbed off. Only 10% of all salmon eggs are estimated to survive to this stage.

The smolt body chemistry changes, allowing them to live in salt water. While a few species of salmon remain in fresh water throughout their life cycle, the majority are anadromous and migrate to the ocean for maturation: in these species, smolts spend a portion of their out-migration time in brackish water, where their body chemistry becomes accustomed to osmoregulation in the ocean. This body chemistry change is hormone-driven, causing physiological adjustments in the function of osmoregulatory organs such as the gills, which leads to large increases in their ability to secrete salt. Hormones involved in increasing salinity tolerance include insulin-like growth factor I, cortisol, and thyroid hormones, which permits the fish to endure the transition from a freshwater environment to the ocean.

The salmon spend about one to five years (depending on the species) in the open ocean, where they gradually become sexually mature. The adult salmon then return primarily to their natal streams to spawn. Atlantic salmon spend between one and four years at sea. When a fish returns after just one year's sea feeding, it is called a grilse in Canada, Britain, and Ireland. Grilse may be present at spawning, and go unnoticed by large males, releasing their own sperm on the eggs.

Prior to spawning, depending on the species, salmon undergo changes. They may grow a hump, develop canine-like teeth, or develop a kype (a pronounced curvature of the jaws in male salmon). All change from the silvery blue of a fresh-run fish from the sea to a darker colour. Salmon can make amazing journeys, sometimes moving hundreds of miles upstream against strong currents and rapids to reproduce. Chinook and sockeye salmon from central Idaho, for example, travel over 1,400 km (900 mi) and climb nearly 2,100 m (7,000 ft) from the Pacific Ocean as they return to spawn. Condition tends to deteriorate the longer the fish remain in fresh water, and they then deteriorate further after they spawn, when they are known as kelts. In all species of Pacific salmon, the mature individuals die within a few days or weeks of spawning, a trait known as semelparity. Between 2 and 4% of Atlantic salmon kelts survive to spawn again, all females. However, even in those species of salmon that may survive to spawn more than once (iteroparity), postspawning mortality is quite high (perhaps as high as 40 to 50%).

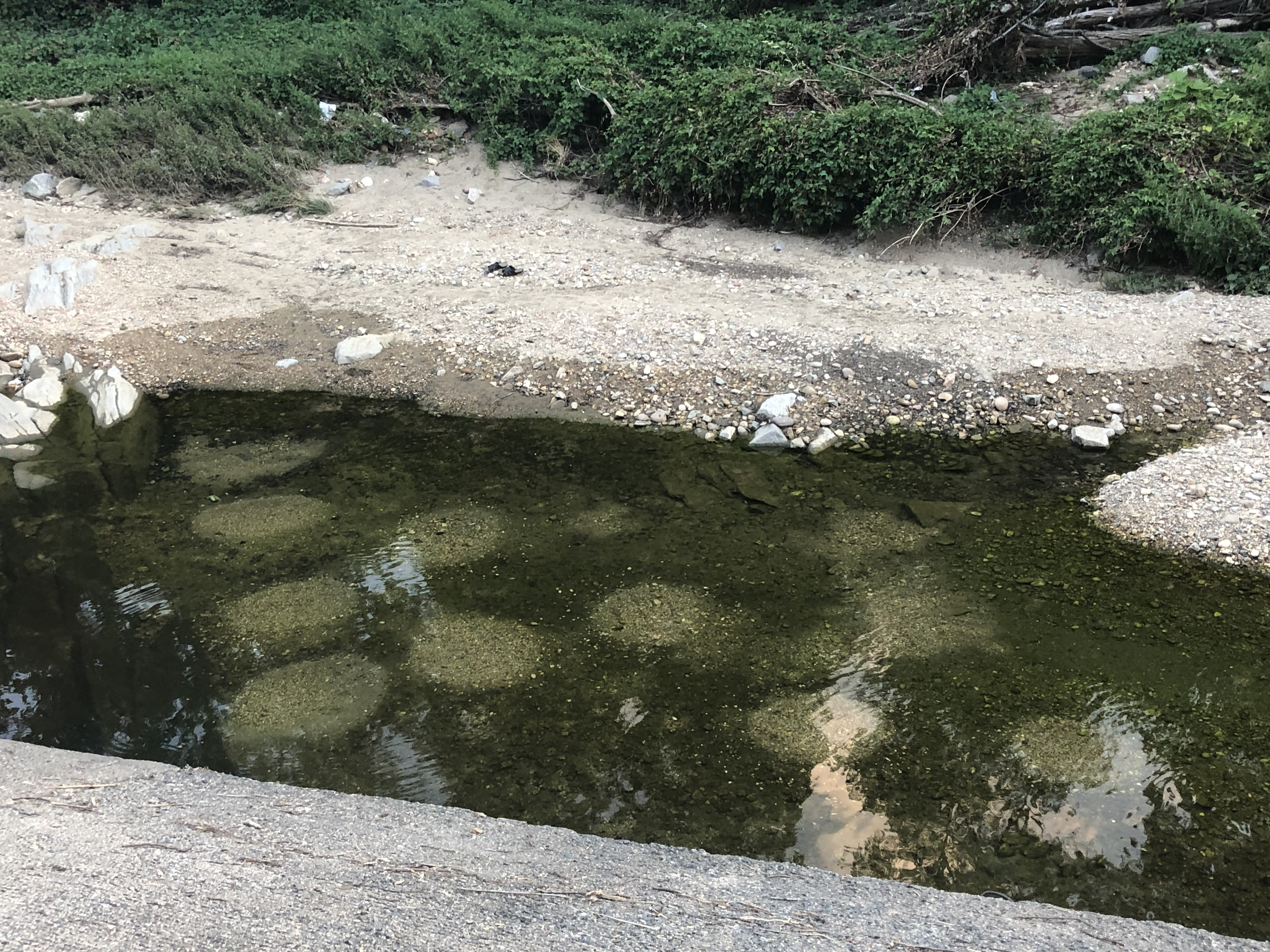
Redds on riverbed

To lay her roe, the female salmon uses her tail (caudal fin), to create a low-pressure zone, lifting gravel to be swept downstream, excavating a shallow depression, called a redd. The redd may sometimes contain 5,000 eggs covering 2.8 m^{2} (30 sq ft). The eggs usually range from orange to red. One or more males approach the female in her redd, depositing sperm, or milt, over the roe. The female then covers the eggs by disturbing the gravel at the upstream edge of the depression before moving on to make another redd. The female may make as many as seven redds before her supply of eggs is exhausted.

Each year, the fish experiences a period of rapid growth, often in summer, and one of slower growth, normally in winter. This results in ring formation around an earbone called the otolith (annuli), analogous to the growth rings visible in a tree trunk. Freshwater growth shows as densely crowded rings, sea growth as widely spaced rings; spawning is marked by significant erosion as body mass is converted into eggs and milt.

Freshwater streams and estuaries provide important habitat for many salmon species. They feed on terrestrial and aquatic insects, amphipods, and other crustaceans while young, and primarily on other fish when older. Eggs are laid in deeper water with larger gravel and need cool water and good water flow (to supply oxygen) to the developing embryos. Mortality of salmon in the early life stages is usually high due to natural predation and human-induced changes in habitat, such as siltation, high water temperatures, low oxygen concentration, loss of stream cover, and reductions in river flow. Estuaries and their associated wetlands provide vital nursery areas for the salmon prior to their departure to the open ocean. Wetlands not only help buffer the estuary from silt and pollutants, but also provide important feeding and hiding areas.

Salmon not killed by other means show greatly accelerated deterioration (phenoptosis, or "programmed aging") at the end of their lives. Their bodies rapidly deteriorate right after they spawn as a result of the release of massive amounts of corticosteroids.

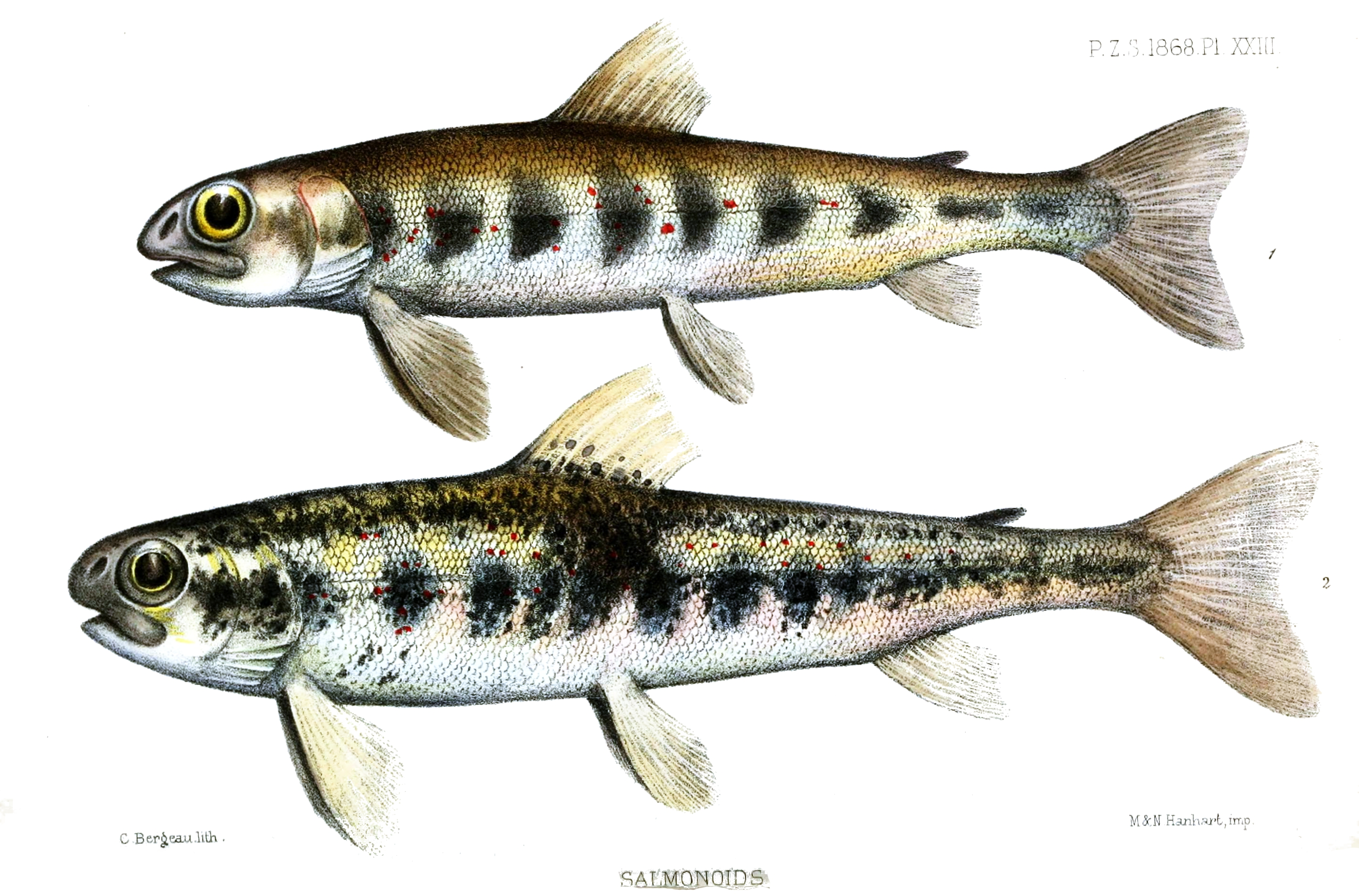
Juvenile salmon, parr, grow up in the relatively protected natal river

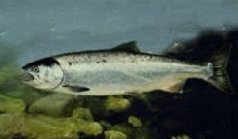
The parr lose their camouflage bars and become smolt as they become ready for the transition to the ocean.

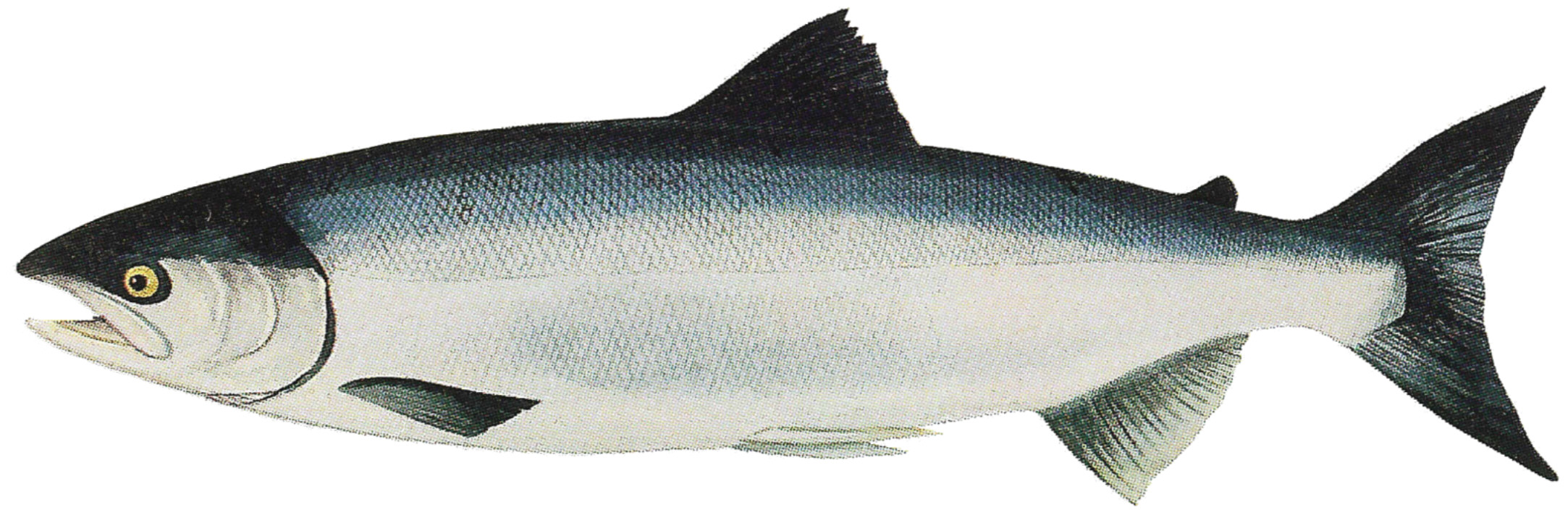
Male ocean-phase adult sockeye

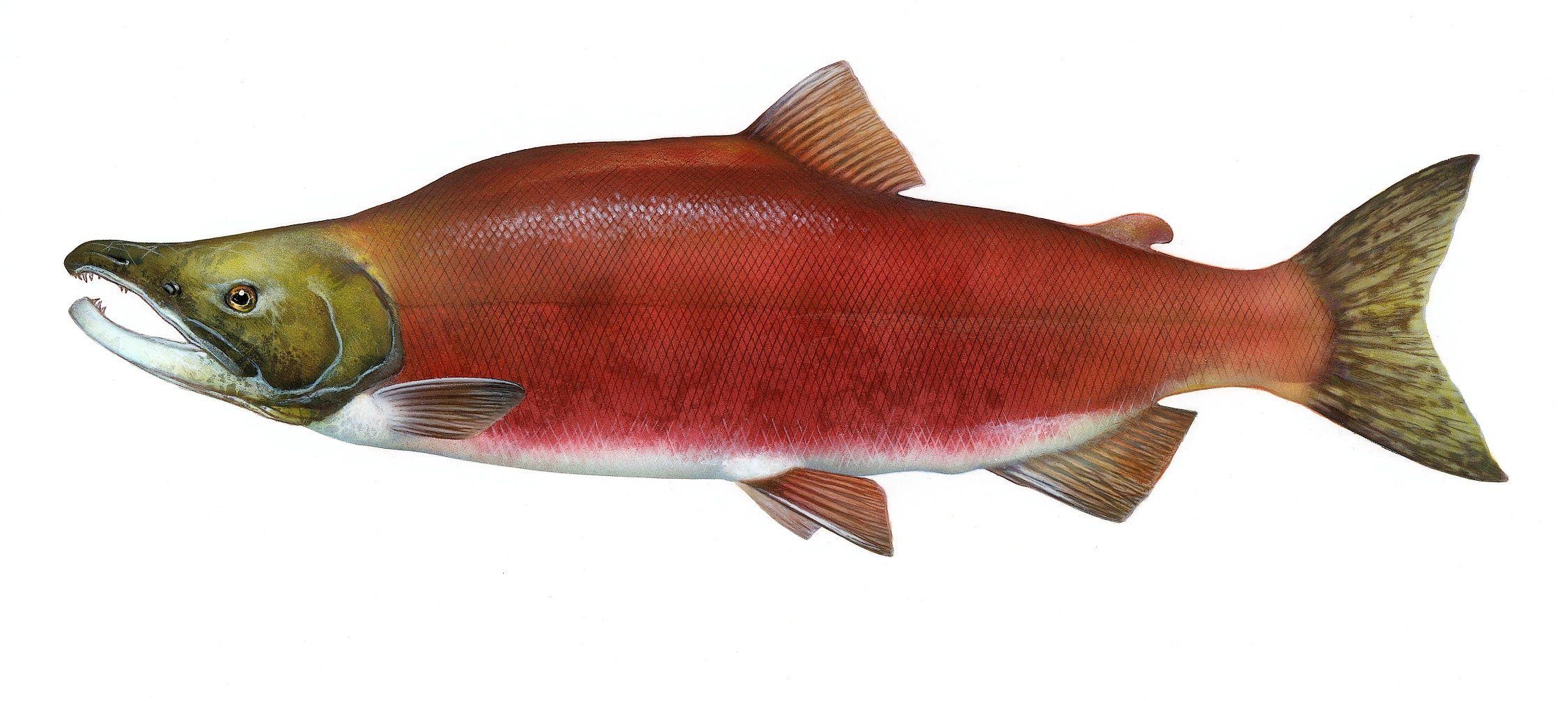
Male spawning-phase adult sockeye

== Diet ==
Salmon are mid-level carnivores whose diet change according to their life stage. Salmon fry predominantly feed upon zooplankton until they reach fingerling sizes, when they start to consume more aquatic invertebrates such as insect larvae, microcrustaceans and worms. As juveniles (parrs), they become more predatory and actively prey upon aquatic insects, small crustaceans, tadpoles and small bait fishes. They are also known to breach the water to attack terrestrial insects such as grasshoppers and dragonflies, as well as consuming fish eggs (even those of other salmon).

As adults, salmon behave like other mid-sized pelagic fish, eating a variety of sea creatures including smaller forage fish such as lanternfish, herrings, sand lances, mackerels and barracudina. They also eat krill, squid and polychaete worms.

== Ecology ==
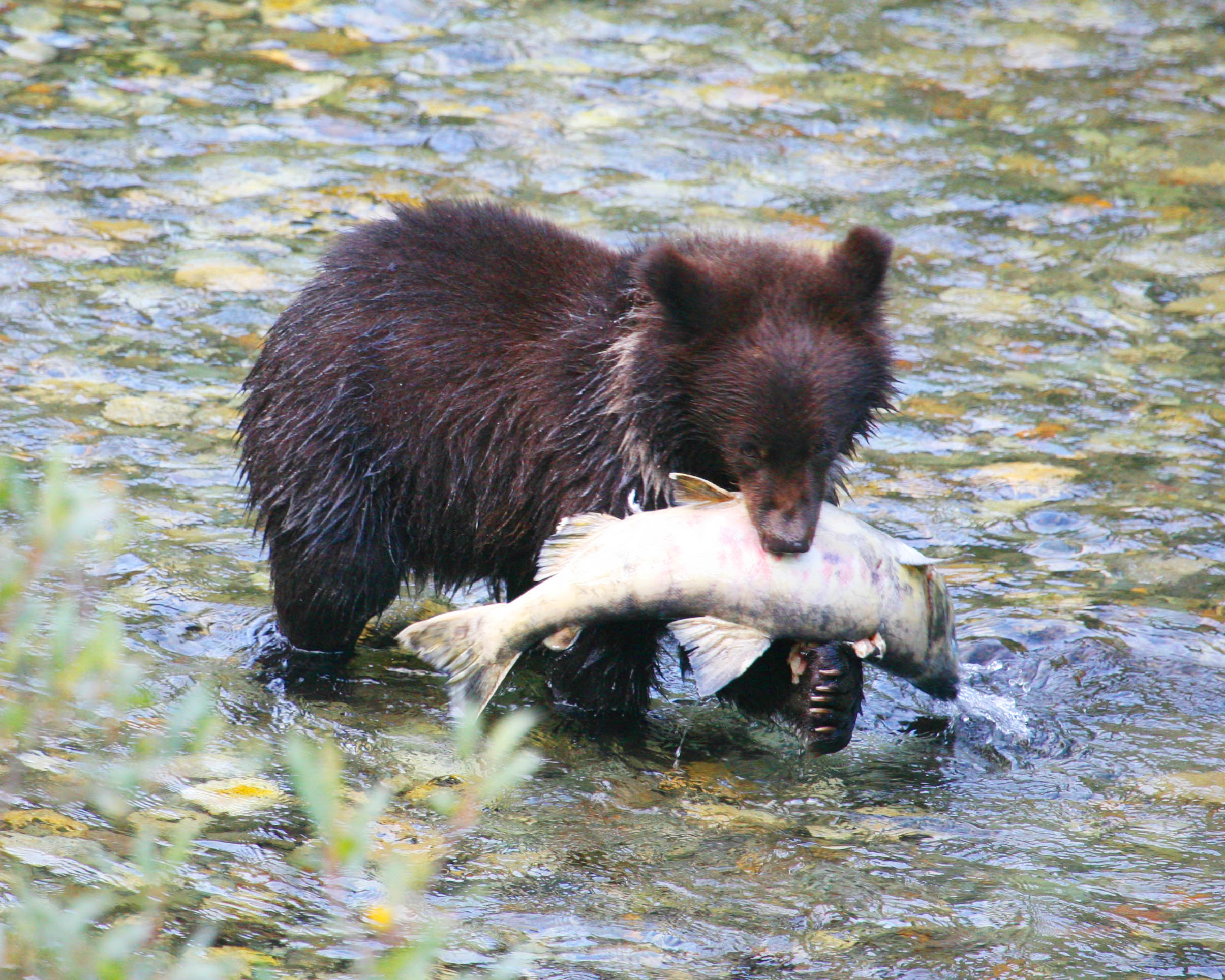
Bear cub with salmon

In the Pacific Northwest and Alaska, salmon are keystone species. The migrations of salmon represent a massive retrograde nutrient transfer, rich in nitrogen, sulfur, carbon and phosphorus, from the ocean to the inland freshwater ecosystems. Predation by piscivorous land animals (such as ospreys, bears and otters) along the journey serve to transfer the nutrients from the water to land, and decomposition of salmon carcasses benefits the forest ecosystem.

In the case of Pacific salmon, most (if not all) of the salmon that survive to reach the headwater spawning grounds will die after laying eggs and their dead bodies sink to cover the gravel beds, with the nutrients released from the biodegradation of their corpses providing a significant boost to these otherwise biomass-poor shallow streams.

=== Bears ===
Grizzly bears function as ecosystem engineers, capturing salmon and carrying them into adjacent dry land to eat the fish. There they deposit nutrient-rich urine and feces and partially eaten carcasses. Bears preparing for hibernation tend to preferentially consume the more nutrient- and energy-rich salmon roes and brain over the actual flesh, and are estimated to discard up to half the salmon they've harvested uneaten on the forest floor, in densities that can reach 4,000 kg (8,800 lb) per hectare, providing as much as 24% of the total nitrogen available to the riparian woodlands. The foliage of spruce trees up to 500 m (1,600 ft) from a stream where grizzlies fish salmon have been found to contain nitrogen originating from the fished salmon.

=== Beavers ===
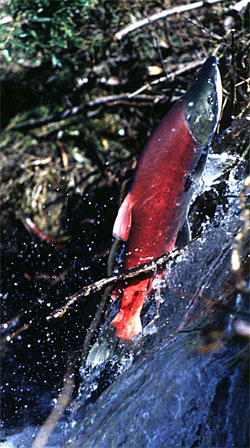
Sockeye salmon jumping over beaver dam

Beavers also function as ecosystem engineers; in the process of tree-cutting and damming, beavers alter the local ecosystems extensively. Beaver ponds can provide critical habitat for juvenile salmon.

An example of this was seen in the years following 1818 in the Columbia River Basin. In 1818, the British government made an agreement with the U.S. government to allow U.S. citizens access to the Columbia catchment (see Treaty of 1818). At the time, the Hudson's Bay Company sent word to trappers to extirpate all furbearers from the area in an effort to make the area less attractive to U.S. fur traders. In response to the elimination of beavers from large parts of the river system, salmon runs plummeted, even in the absence of many of the factors usually associated with the demise of salmon runs. Salmon recruitment can be affected by beavers' dams because dams can:

- Slow the rate at which nutrients are flushed from the water system; nutrients provided by adult salmon dying throughout the fall and winter remain available in the spring to newly hatched juveniles
- Provide deeper salmon pools where young salmon can avoid avian predators
- Increase productivity through algal photosynthesis and by enhancing the conversion efficiency of the cellulose-powered detritus cycle
- Create slow-water environments where juvenile salmon put the food they ingest into growth rather than into fighting currents
- Increase structural complexity with many physical niches where salmon can avoid predators

Beaver dams are able to nurture salmon juveniles in estuarine tidal marshes where the salinity is less than 10 ppm. Beavers build small dams of generally less than 60 cm (2 ft) high in channels in the myrtle zone. These dams can be overtopped at high tide and hold water at low tide. This provides refuges for juvenile salmon so they do not have to swim into large channels where they are subject to predation by larger fish.

=== Lampreys ===
It has been discovered that rivers which have seen a decline or disappearance of anadromous lampreys, loss of the lampreys also affects the salmon in a negative way. Like salmon, anadromous lampreys stop feeding and die after spawning, and their decomposing bodies release nutrients into the stream. Also, along with species like rainbow trout and Sacramento sucker, lampreys clean the gravel in the rivers during spawning. Their larvae, called ammocoetes, are filter feeders which contribute to the health of the waters. They are also a food source for the young salmon, and being fattier and oilier, it is assumed predators prefer them over salmon offspring, taking off some of the predation pressure on smolts. Adult lampreys are also the preferred prey of seals and sea lions, which can eat 30 lampreys to every salmon, allowing more adult salmon to enter the rivers to spawn without being eaten by the marine mammals.

=== Parasites ===
According to Canadian biologist Dorothy Kieser, the myxozoan parasite Henneguya salminicola is commonly found in the flesh of salmonids. It has been recorded in the field samples of salmon returning to the Haida Gwaii Islands. The fish responds by walling off the parasitic infection into a number of cysts that contain milky fluid. This fluid is an accumulation of a large number of parasites.

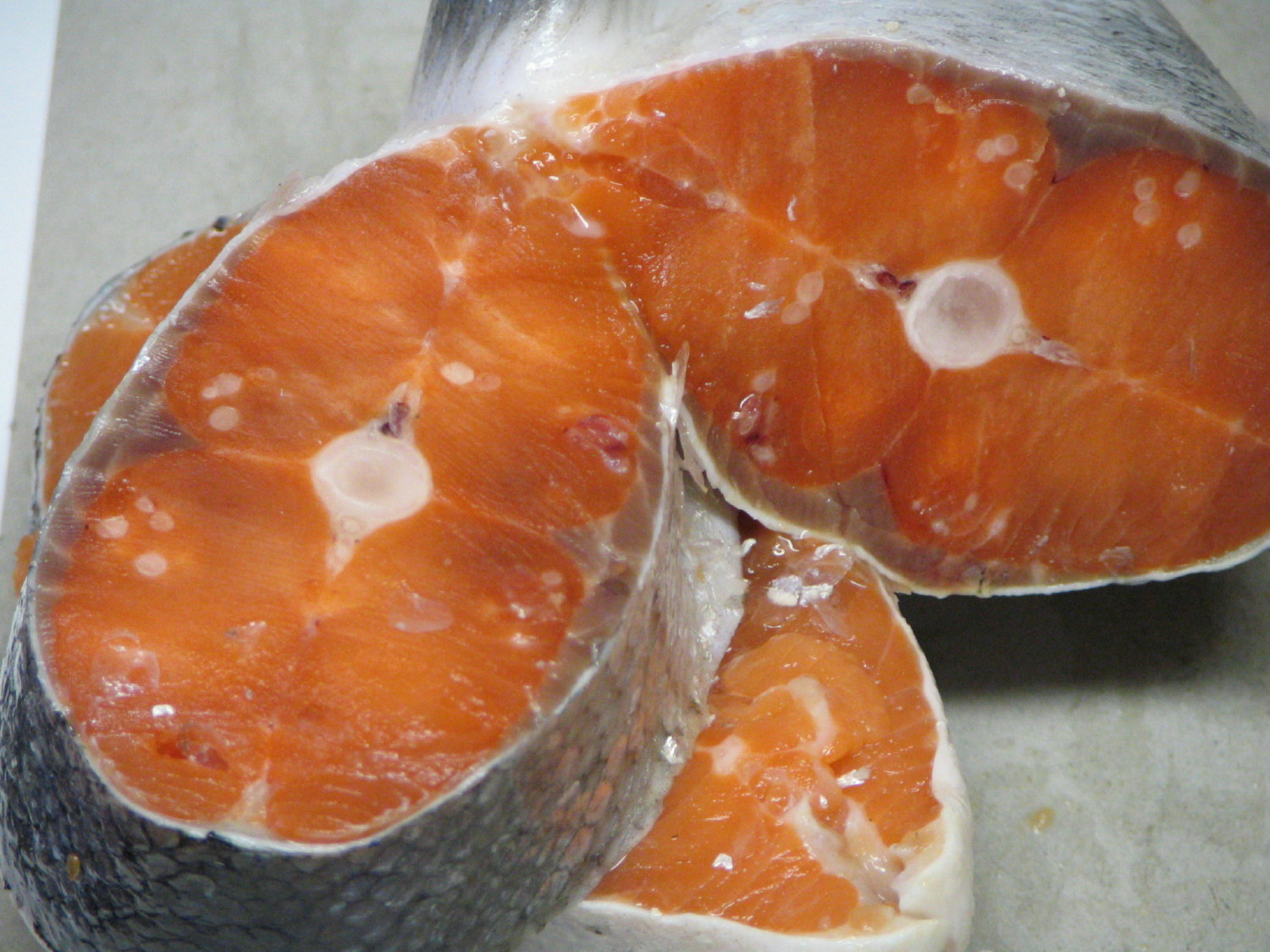
Henneguya salminicola, a myxozoan parasite commonly found in the flesh of salmonids on the West Coast of Canada, in coho salmon

Henneguya and other parasites in the myxosporean group have complex life cycles, where the salmon is one of two hosts. The fish releases the spores after spawning. In the Henneguya case, the spores enter a second host, most likely an invertebrate, in the spawning stream. When juvenile salmon migrate to the Pacific Ocean, the second host releases a stage infective to salmon. The parasite is then carried in the salmon until the next spawning cycle. The myxosporean parasite that causes whirling disease in trout has a similar life cycle. However, as opposed to whirling disease, the Henneguya infestation does not appear to cause disease in the host salmon—even heavily infected fish tend to return to spawn successfully.

According to Dr. Kieser, a lot of work on Henneguya salminicola was done by scientists at the Pacific Biological Station in Nanaimo in the mid-1980s, in particular, an overview report which states, "the fish that have the longest fresh water residence time as juveniles have the most noticeable infections. Hence in order of prevalence, coho are most infected followed by sockeye, chinook, chum and pink. As well, the report says, at the time the studies were conducted, stocks from the middle and upper reaches of large river systems in British Columbia such as Fraser, Skeena, Nass and from mainland coastal streams in the southern half of B.C., "are more likely to have a low prevalence of infection." The report also states, "It should be stressed that Henneguya, economically deleterious though it is, is harmless from the view of public health. It is strictly a fish parasite that cannot live in or affect warm blooded animals, including man".

According to Klaus Schallie, Molluscan Shellfish Program Specialist with the Canadian Food Inspection Agency, "Henneguya salminicola is found in southern B.C. also and in all species of salmon. I have previously examined smoked chum salmon sides that were riddled with cysts and some sockeye runs in Barkley Sound (southern B.C., west coast of Vancouver Island) are noted for their high incidence of infestation."

Sea lice, particularly Lepeophtheirus salmonis and various Caligus species, including C. clemensi and C. rogercresseyi, can cause deadly infestations of both farm-grown and wild salmon. Sea lice are ectoparasites which feed on mucus, blood, and skin, and migrate and latch onto the skin of wild salmon during free-swimming, planktonic nauplii and copepodid larval stages, which can persist for several days.

Large numbers of highly populated, open-net salmon farms (Note: Open-net fish farms are large anchored floating net cages often located in bays and relatively sheltered areas. Each farm may have over a million fish.) can create exceptionally large concentrations of sea lice; when exposed in river estuaries containing large numbers of open-net farms, many young wild salmon are infected, and do not survive as a result. Adult salmon may survive otherwise critical numbers of sea lice, but small, thin-skinned juvenile salmon migrating to sea are highly vulnerable. On the Pacific coast of Canada, the louse-induced mortality of pink salmon in some regions is commonly over 80%.

=== Effect of pile driving ===
The risk of injury caused by underwater pile driving has been studied by Dr. Halvorsen and her co-workers. The study concluded that the fish are at risk of injury if the cumulative sound exposure level exceeds 210 dB relative to 1 μPa^{2} s.

== Wild fisheries ==
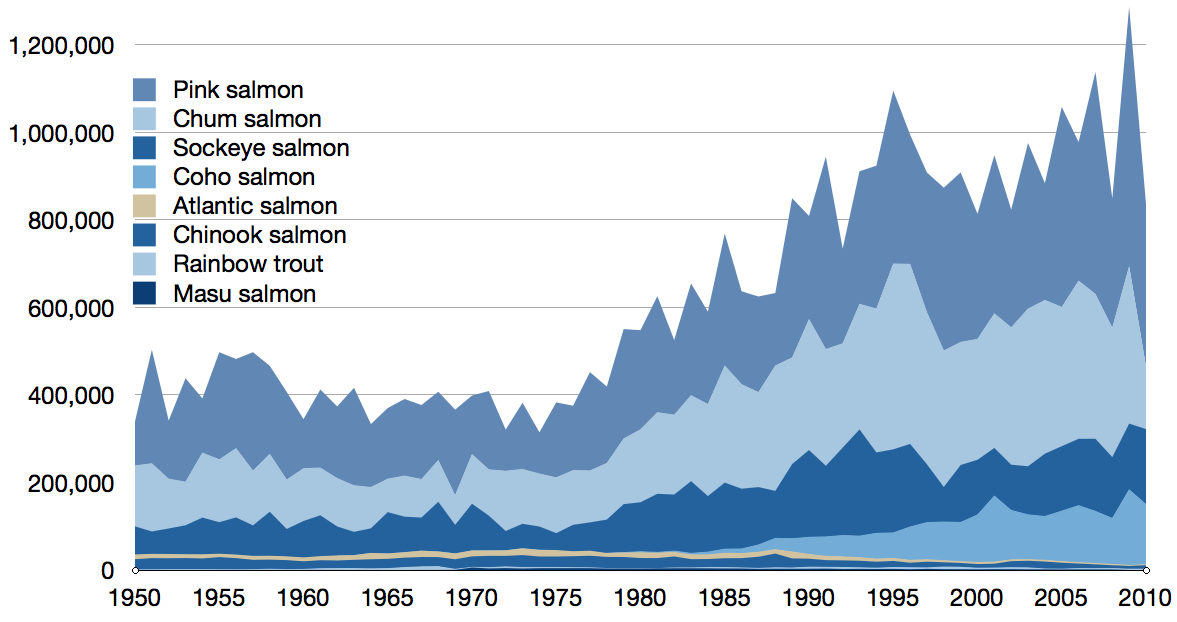
Wild fisheries – commercial capture in tonnes of all true wild salmon species 1950–2010, as reported by the FAO

=== Commercial ===
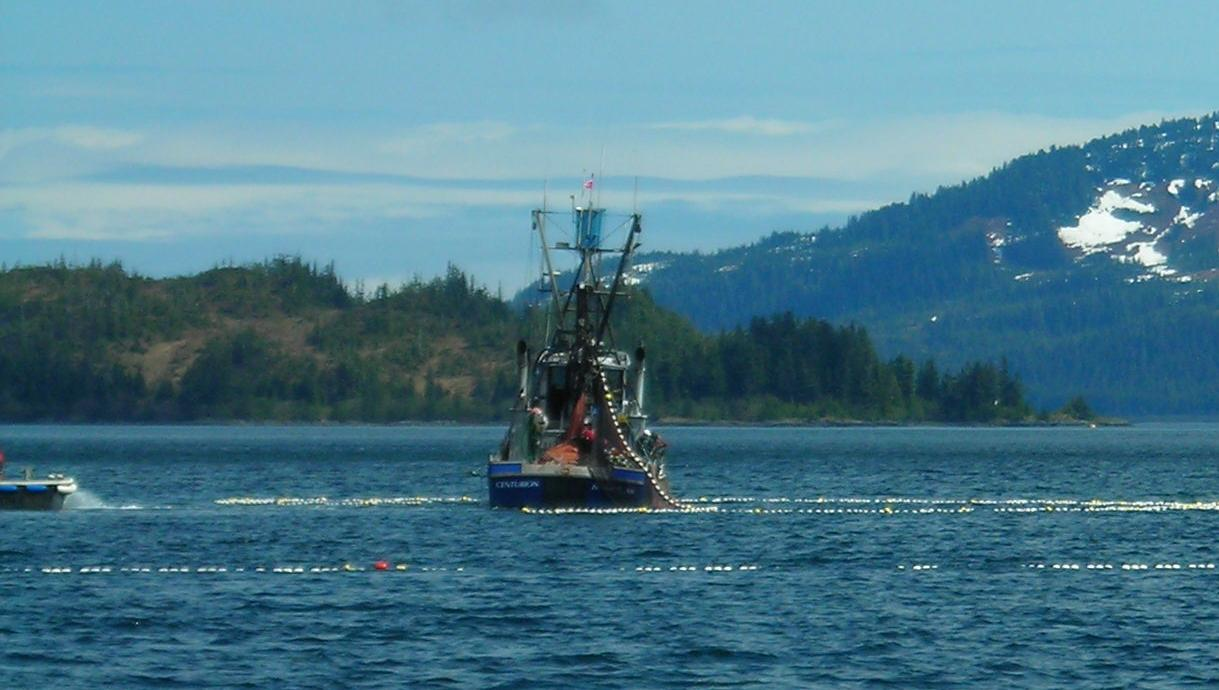
Seine fishing for salmon Prince William Sound, Alaska

As can be seen from the production chart, the global capture reported by different countries to the FAO of commercial wild salmon has remained fairly steady since 1990 at about one million tonnes per year. This is in contrast to farmed salmon (below) which has increased in the same period from about 0.6 million tonnes to well over two million tonnes.

Nearly all captured wild salmon are Pacific salmon. The capture of wild Atlantic salmon has always been relatively small, and has declined steadily since 1990. In 2011 only 2,500 tonnes were reported. In contrast, about half of all farmed salmon are Atlantic salmon.

=== Recreational ===
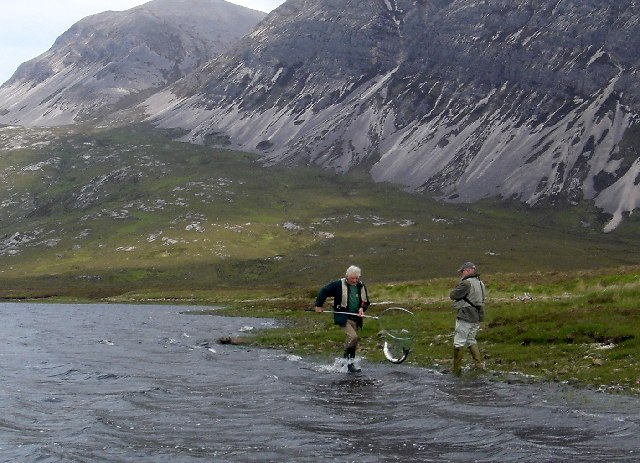
Angler and gillie landing a salmon in Scotland

Recreational salmon fishing can be a technically demanding kind of sport fishing, not necessarily intuitive for beginning fishermen. A conflict exists between commercial fishermen and recreational fishermen for the right to salmon stock resources. Commercial fishing in estuaries and coastal areas is often restricted so enough salmon can return to their natal rivers where they can spawn and be available for sport fishing. On parts of the North American West Coast salmon sport fishing has completely replaced inshore commercial salmon fishing. In most cases, the commercial value of a salmon sold as seafood can be several times less than the value attributed to the same fish caught by a sport fisherman. This is "a powerful economic argument for allocating stock resources preferentially to sport fishing".

== Farms ==
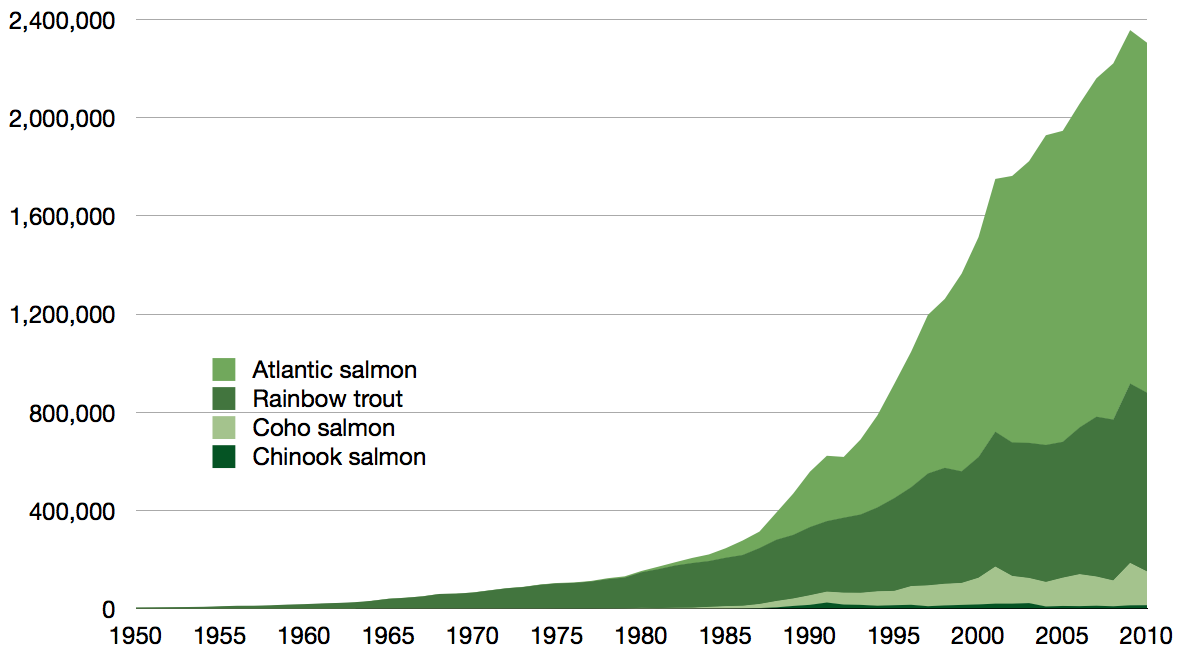
Aquaculture production in tonnes of all true salmon species 1950–2010, as reported by the FAO

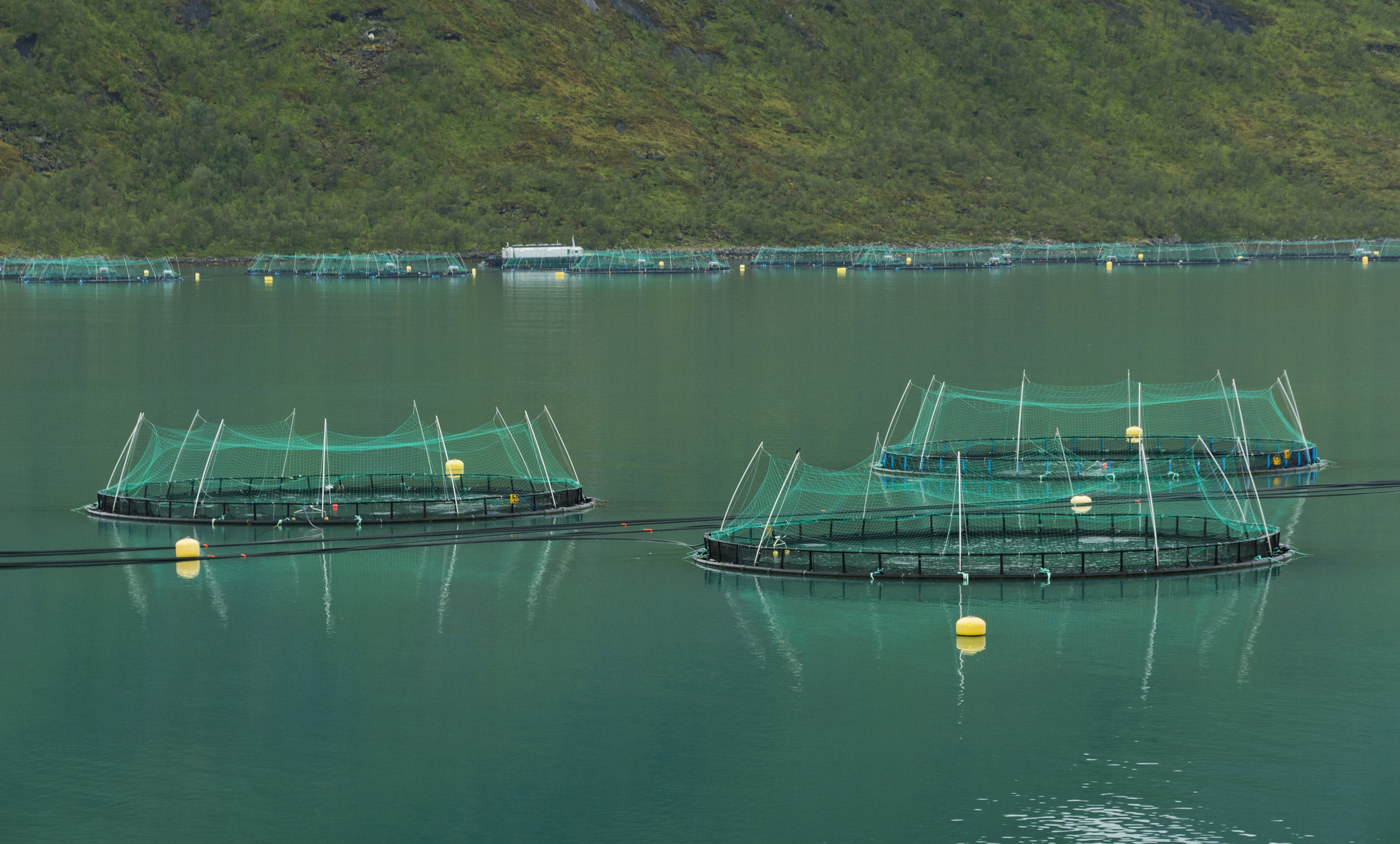
Salmon farming sea cage in Torskefjorden, Senja Island, Troms, Norway

Salmon aquaculture is a major contributor to the world production of farmed finfish, representing about US$10 billion annually. Other commonly cultured fish species include tilapia, catfish, sea bass, carp and bream. Salmon farming is significant in Chile, Norway, Scotland, Canada and the Faroe Islands; it is the source for most salmon consumed in the United States and Europe. Atlantic salmon are also, in very small volumes, farmed in Russia and Tasmania, Australia.

Salmon are carnivorous, and need to be fed meals produced from catching other wild forage fish and other marine organisms. Salmon farming leads to a high demand for wild forage fish. As a predator, salmon require large nutritional intakes of protein, and farmed salmon consume more fish than they generate as a final product. On a dry weight basis, 2–4 kg of wild-caught fish are needed to produce one kilogram of salmon. As the salmon farming industry expands, it requires more forage fish for feed, at a time when 75% of the world's monitored fisheries are already near to or have exceeded their maximum sustainable yield. The industrial-scale extraction of wild forage fish for salmon farming affects the survivability of other wild predatory fish which rely on them for food. Research is ongoing into sustainable and plant-based salmon feeds.

Intensive salmon farming uses open-net cages, which have low production costs. It has the drawback of allowing disease and sea lice to spread to local wild salmon stocks.

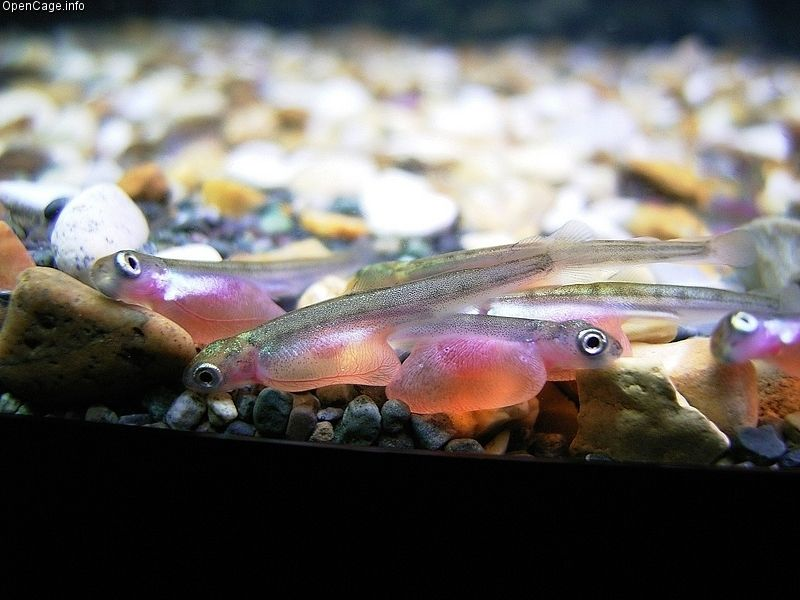
Artificially incubated chum salmon fries

Another form of salmon production, which is safer but less controllable, is to raise salmon in hatcheries until they are old enough to become independent. They are released into rivers in an attempt to increase the salmon population. This system is referred to as ranching. It was very common in countries such as Sweden, before the Norwegians developed salmon farming, but is seldom done by private companies. As anyone may catch the salmon when they return to spawn, a company is limited in benefiting financially from their investment.

Because of this, the ranching method has mainly been used by various public authorities and non-profit groups, such as the Cook Inlet Aquaculture Association, as a way to increase salmon populations in situations where they have declined due to overharvesting, construction of dams and habitat destruction or fragmentation. Negative consequences to this sort of population manipulation include genetic "dilution" of the wild stocks. Many jurisdictions are now beginning to discourage supplemental fish planting in favour of harvest controls, and habitat improvement and protection.

A variant method of fish stocking, called ocean ranching, is under development in Alaska. There, the young salmon are released into the ocean far from any wild salmon streams. When it is time for them to spawn, they return to where they were released, where fishermen can catch them.

An alternative method to hatcheries is to use spawning channels. These are artificial streams, usually parallel to an existing stream, with concrete or rip-rap sides and gravel bottoms. Water from the adjacent stream is piped into the top of the channel, sometimes via a header pond, to settle out sediment. Spawning success is often much better in channels than in adjacent streams due to the control of floods, which in some years can wash out the natural redds. Because of the lack of floods, spawning channels must sometimes be cleaned out to remove accumulated sediment. The same floods that destroy natural redds also clean the regular streams. Spawning channels preserve the natural selection of natural streams, as there is no benefit, as in hatcheries, to use prophylactic chemicals to control diseases.

Farm-raised salmon are fed the carotenoids astaxanthin and canthaxanthin to match their flesh colour to wild salmon to improve their marketability. Wild salmon get these carotenoids, primarily astaxanthin, from eating shellfish and krill.

One proposed alternative to the use of wild-caught fish as feed for the salmon, is the use of soy-based products. This should be better for the local environment of the fish farm, but producing soy beans has a high environmental cost for the producing region. The fish omega-3 fatty acid content would be reduced compared to fish-fed salmon.

Another possible alternative is a yeast-based coproduct of bioethanol production, proteinaceous fermentation biomass. Substituting such products for engineered feed can result in equal (sometimes enhanced) growth in fish. With its increasing availability, this would address the problems of rising costs for buying hatchery fish feed.

Yet another attractive alternative is the increased use of seaweed. Seaweed provides essential minerals and vitamins for growing organisms. It offers the advantage of providing natural amounts of dietary fiber and having a lower glycemic load than grain-based fish meal. In the best-case scenario, widespread use of seaweed could yield a future in aquaculture that eliminates the need for land, freshwater, or fertilizer to raise fish.

== Management ==
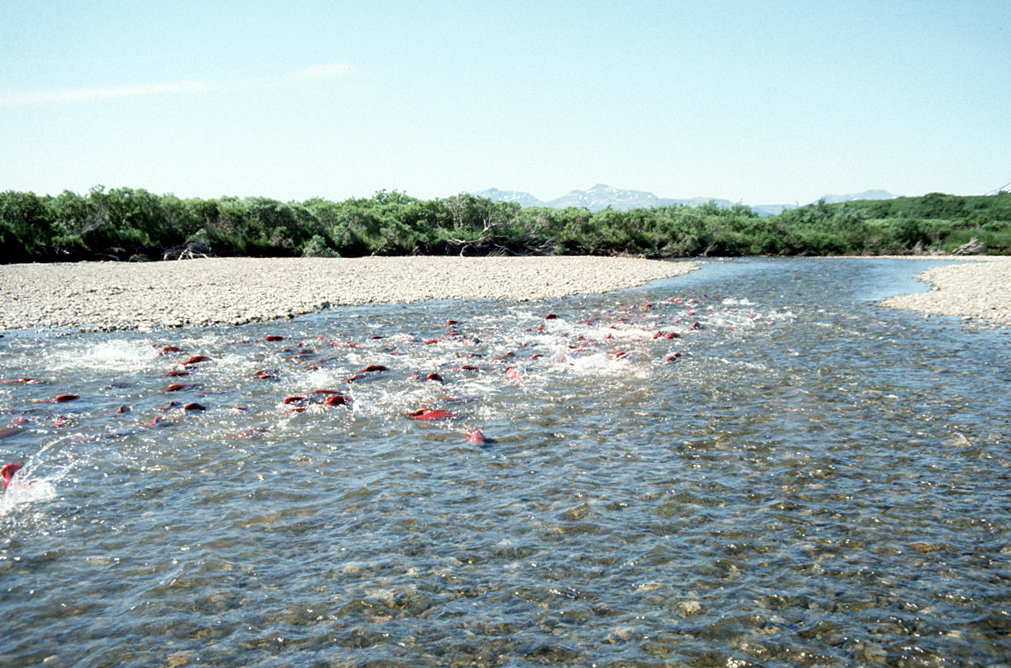
Spawning sockeye salmon in Becharof Creek, Becharof Wilderness, Alaska

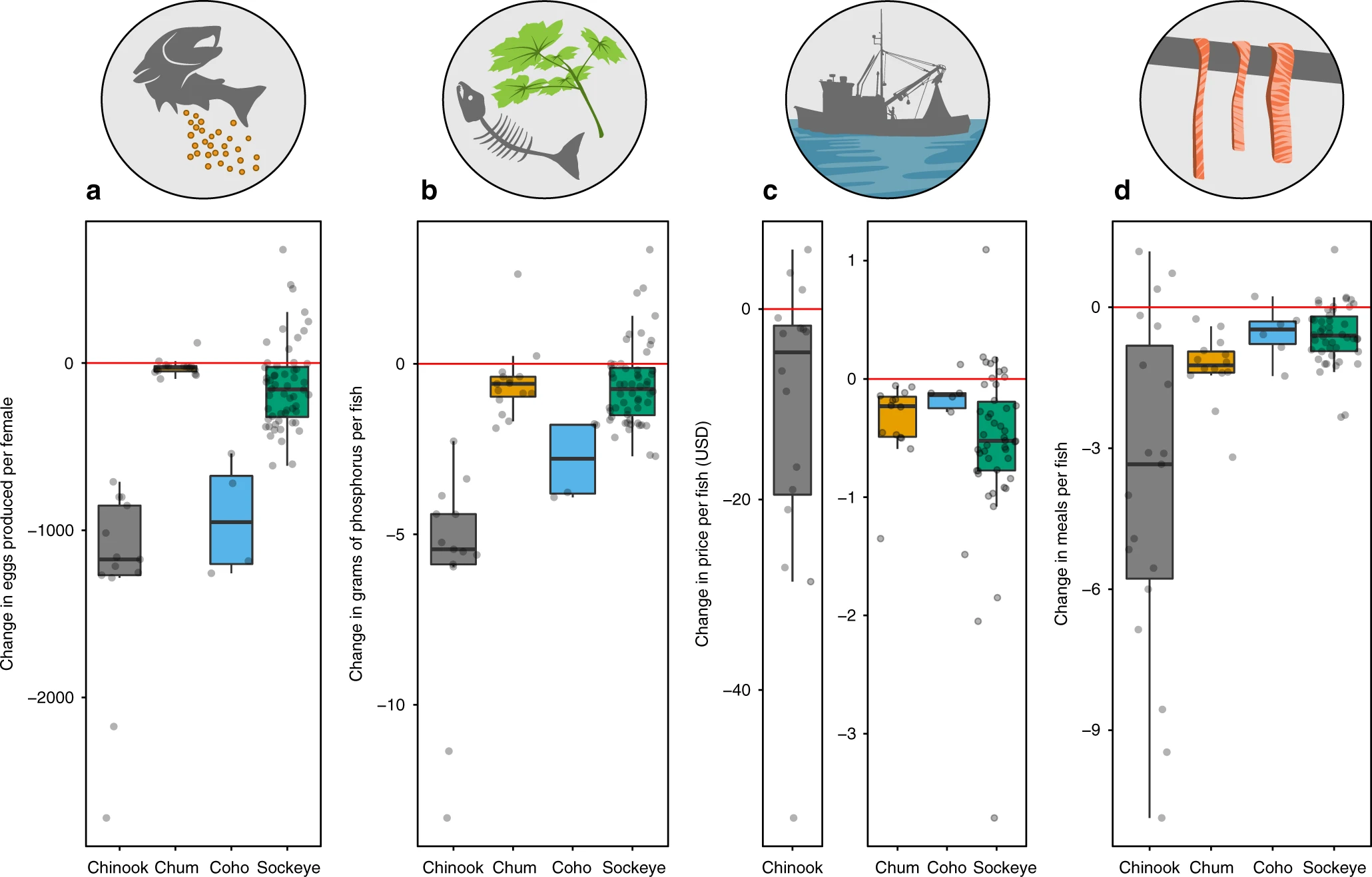
Significant declines in the size of many species of Pacific salmon over the past 30 years are negatively impacting salmon fecundity, nutrient transport, commercial fishery profits, and rural food security.

Salmon population levels are of concern in the Atlantic and in some parts of the Pacific. The population of wild salmon declined markedly in recent decades, especially North Atlantic populations, which spawn in the waters of western Europe and eastern Canada, and wild salmon in the Snake and Columbia River systems in northwestern United States.

Alaska fishery stocks are still abundant, and catches have been on the rise in recent decades, after the state initiated limitations in 1972. Some of the most important Alaskan salmon sustainable wild fisheries are located near the Kenai River, Copper River, and in Bristol Bay. Fish farming of Pacific salmon is outlawed in the United States Exclusive Economic Zone, however, there is a substantial network of publicly funded hatcheries, and the State of Alaska's fisheries management system is viewed as a leader in the management of wild fish stocks.

In Canada, returning Skeena River wild salmon support commercial, subsistence and recreational fisheries, as well as the area's diverse wildlife on the coast and around communities hundreds of miles inland in the watershed. The status of wild salmon in Washington is mixed. Of 435 wild stocks of salmon and steelhead, only 187 of them were classified as healthy; 113 had an unknown status, one was extinct, 12 were in critical condition and 122 were experiencing depressed populations.

The commercial salmon fisheries in California have been either severely curtailed or closed completely in recent years, due to critically low returns on the Klamath and or Sacramento rivers, causing millions of dollars in losses to commercial fishermen. Both Atlantic and Pacific salmon are popular sportfish.

Salmon populations have been established in all the Great Lakes. Coho stocks were planted by the state of Michigan in the late 1960s to control the growing population of non-native alewife. Now Chinook (king), Atlantic, and coho (silver) salmon are annually stocked in all Great Lakes by most bordering states and provinces. These populations are not self-sustaining and do not provide much in the way of a commercial fishery, but have led to the development of a thriving sport fishery.

Wild, self-sustaining Pacific salmon populations have been established in New Zealand, Chile, and Argentina. They are highly prized by sport fishers, but others worry about displacing native fish species. Also, and especially in Chile (Aquaculture in Chile), both Atlantic and Pacific salmon are used in net pen farming.

In 2020 researchers reported widespread declines in the sizes of four species of wild Pacific salmon: Chinook, chum, coho, and sockeye. These declines have been occurring for 30 years, and are thought to be associated with climate change and competition with growing numbers of pink and hatchery salmon.

== As food ==
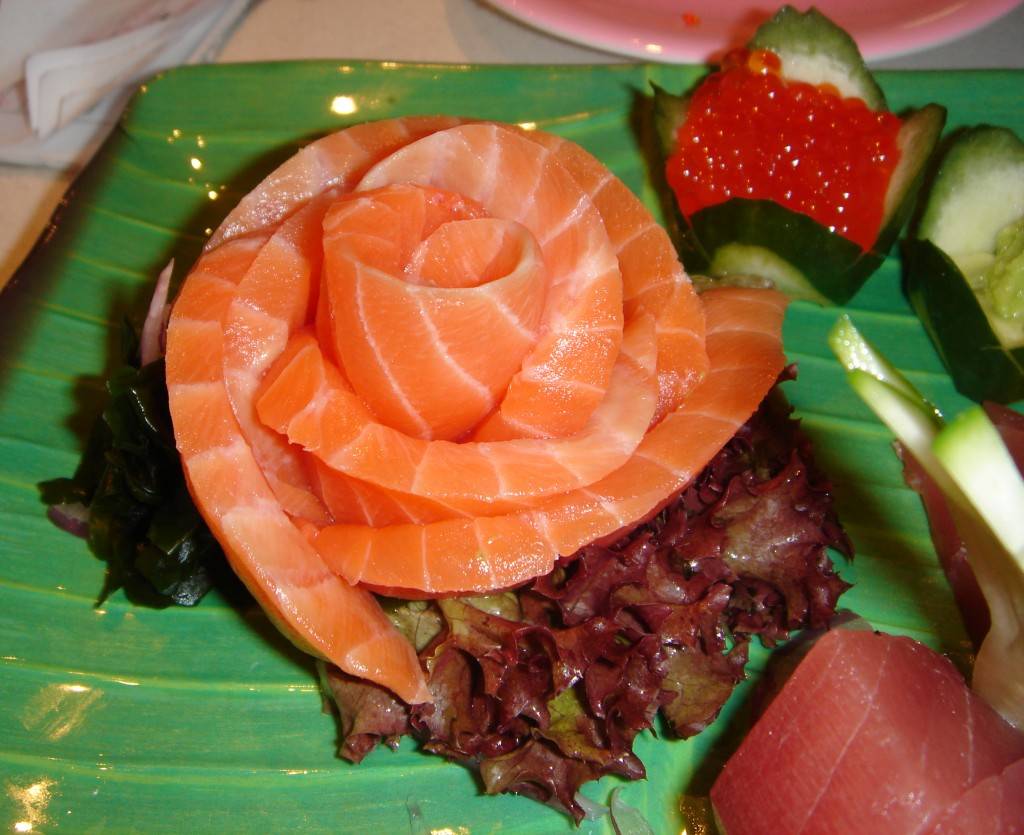
Salmon sashimi

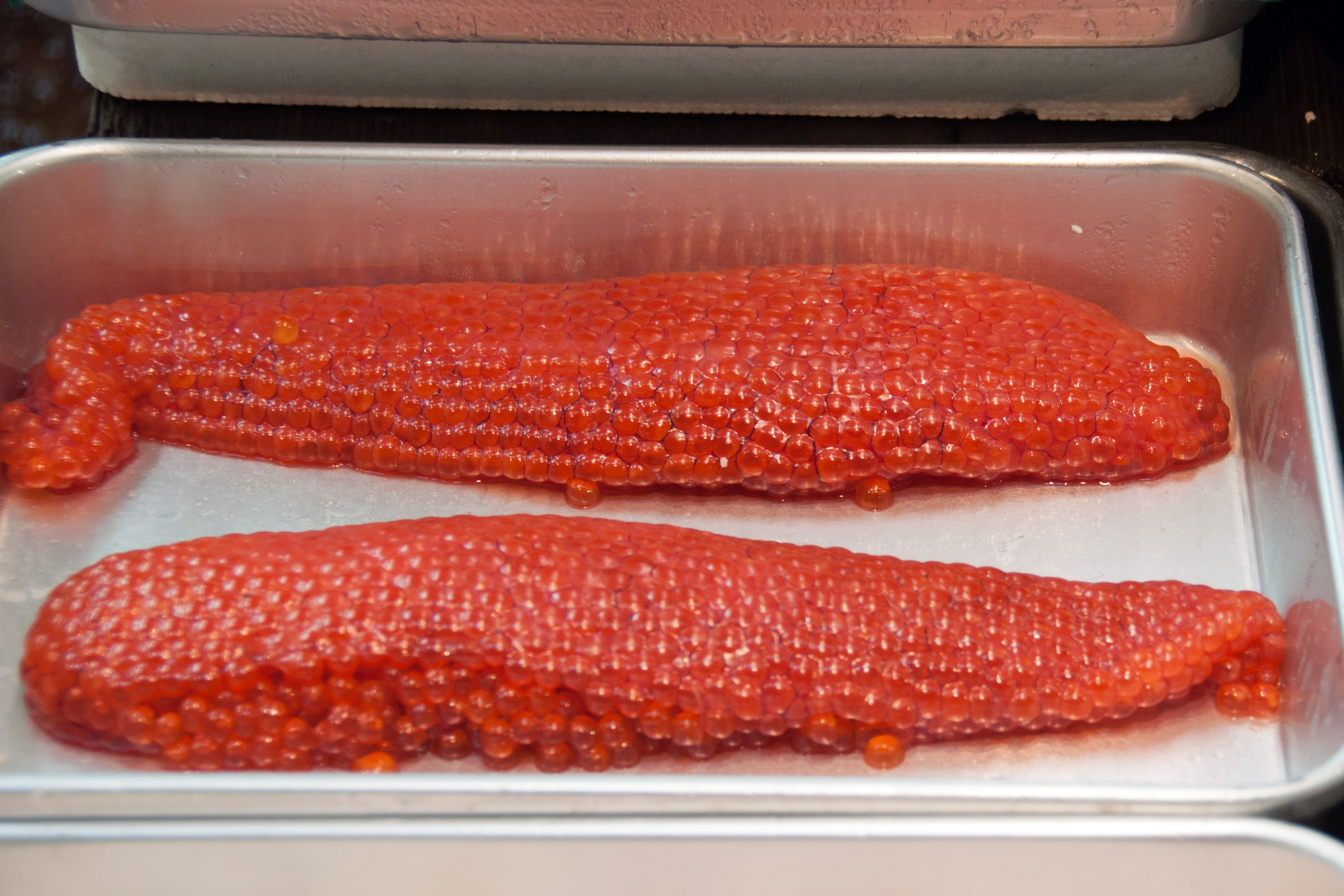
Salmon eggs being sold at Tsukiji fish market in Tokyo, Japan

Salmon is a popular food fish. Classified as an oily fish, salmon is considered to be healthy due to the fish's high protein, high omega-3 fatty acids, and high vitamin D content. Salmon is also a source of cholesterol, with a range of 23–214 mg/100 g depending on the species. According to reports in the journal Science, farmed salmon may contain high levels of dioxins. PCB (polychlorinated biphenyl) levels may be up to eight times higher in farmed salmon than in wild salmon, but still well below levels considered dangerous. Nonetheless, according to a 2006 study published in the Journal of the American Medical Association, the benefits of eating even farmed salmon still outweigh any risks imposed by contaminants. Farmed salmon has a high omega-3 fatty acid content comparable to wild salmon. The type of omega-3 present may not be a factor for other important health functions.

Salmon flesh is generally orange to red, although white-fleshed wild salmon with white-black skin colour occurs. The natural colour of salmon results from carotenoid pigments, largely astaxanthin, but also canthaxanthin, in the flesh. Wild salmon get these carotenoids from eating krill and other tiny shellfish.

The vast majority of Atlantic salmon available in market around the world are farmed (almost 99%), whereas the majority of Pacific salmon are wild-caught (greater than 80%). Canned salmon in the U.S. is usually wild Pacific catch, though some farmed salmon is available in canned form. Smoked salmon is another popular preparation method, and can either be hot- or cold-smoked. Lox can refer to either cold-smoked salmon or salmon cured in a brine solution (also called gravlax). Traditional canned salmon includes some skin (which is harmless) and bone (which adds calcium). Skinless and boneless canned salmon is also available.

Raw salmon flesh may contain Anisakis nematodes, marine parasites that cause anisakiasis. Before the availability of refrigeration, the Japanese did not consume raw salmon. Salmon and salmon roe have only recently come into use in making sashimi (raw fish) and sushi.

To the Indigenous peoples of the Pacific Northwest Coast, salmon is considered a vital part of the diet. Specifically, the indigenous peoples of Haida Gwaii, located near former Queen Charlotte Island in British Columbia, rely on salmon as one of their main sources of food, although many other bands have fished Pacific waters for centuries. Salmon are not only ancient and unique, but it is important because it is expressed in culture, art forms, and ceremonial feasts. Annually, salmon spawn in Haida, feeding on everything on the way upstream and down. Within the Haida nation, salmon is referred to as "tsiin", and is prepared in several ways including smoking, baking, frying, and making soup.

Historically, there has always been enough salmon, as traditional subsistence fishing methods did not result in overfishing, and people only took what they needed. In 2003, a report on First Nations participation in commercial fisheries, including salmon, commissioned by BC's Ministry of Agriculture and Food found that there were 595 First Nation-owned and operated commercial vessels in the province. Of those vessels, First Nations' members owned 564. However, employment within the industry has decreased overall by 50% in the last decade, with 8,142 registered commercial fishermen in 2003. This has affected employment for many fisherman, who rely on salmon as a source of income.

Black bears also rely on salmon as food. The leftovers the bears leave behind are considered important nutrients for the Canadian forest, such as the soil, trees and plants. In this sense, the salmon feed the forest and in return receive clean water and gravel in which to hatch and grow, sheltered from extremes of temperature and water flow in times of high and low rainfall. However, the condition of the salmon in Haida has been affected in recent decades. Due to logging and development, much of the salmon's habitat (i.e., Ain River) has been destroyed, resulting in the fish being close to endangered. For residents, this has resulted in limits on catches, which, in turn, has affected families' diets and cultural events such as feasts. Some of the salmon systems in danger include the Davidon, Naden, Mamim, and Mathers.

== Fishing ==
=== History ===
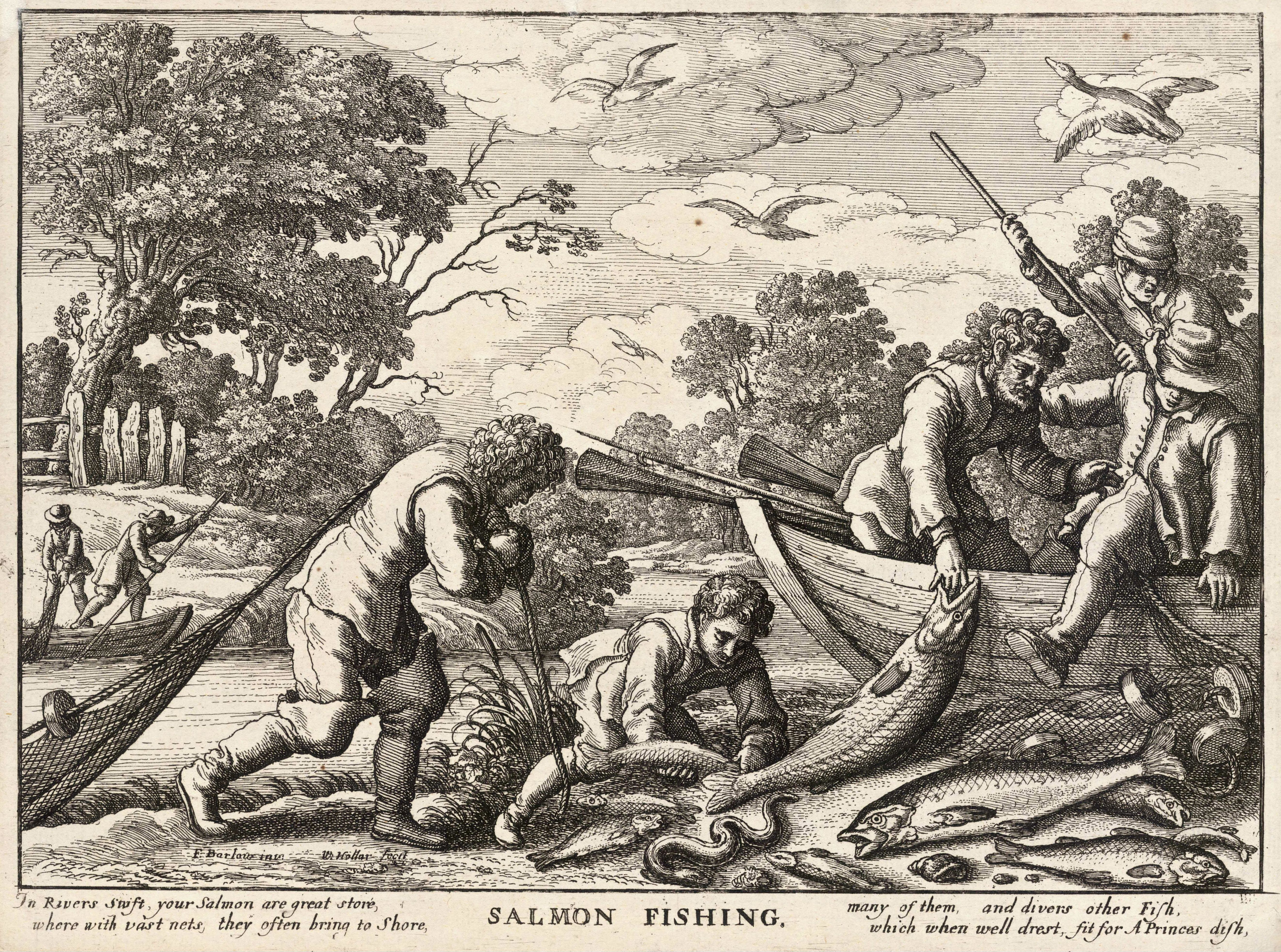
Seine fishing for salmon – Wenzel Hollar, 1607–1677

The salmon has long been at the heart of the culture and livelihood of coastal dwellers, which can be traced as far back as 5,000 years when archeologists discovered Nisqually tribe remnants. The original distribution of the genus Oncorhynchus covered the Pacific Rim coastline. History shows salmon used tributaries, rivers and estuaries without regard to jurisdiction for 18–22 million years. Baseline data is near impossible to recreate based on the inconsistent historical data, but there has been massive depletion since the 1900s. The Pacific Northwest once sprawled with native inhabitants who ensured little degradation was caused by their actions to salmon habitats. As animists, the indigenous people relied not only for salmon for food, but spiritual guidance. The role of the salmon spirit guided the people to respect ecological systems such as the rivers and tributaries the salmon used for spawning. Natives often used the entire fish and left little waste by turning the bladder into glue, and using bones for toys and skin for clothing and shoes. The original salmon ceremony, introduced by indigenous tribes on the Pacific coast, consisted of three major parts. First was the welcoming of the first catch, and then the cooking of it. Finally the bones were returned to the sea to induce hospitality so other salmon would give their lives to the people of that village.

Many tribes, such as the Yurok, had a taboo against harvesting the first fish that swam upriver in summer, but once they confirmed that the salmon run had returned in abundance they would begin to catch them in plentiful. The indigenous practices were guided by deep ecological wisdom, which was eradicated when Euro-American settlements began to be developed. Salmon have a much grander history than what is presently shown today. The salmon that once dominated the Pacific Ocean are now just a fraction in population and size. The Pacific salmon population is now less than 1–3% of what it was when Lewis and Clark arrived at the region. In his 1908 State of the Union address, U.S. President Theodore Roosevelt observed that the fisheries were in significant decline:

The salmon fisheries of the Columbia River are now but a fraction of what they were twenty-five years ago, and what they would be now if the United States Government had taken complete charge of them by intervening between Oregon and Washington. During these twenty-five years the fishermen of each State have naturally tried to take all they could get, and the two legislatures have never been able to agree on joint action of any kind adequate in degree for the protection of the fisheries. At the moment the fishing on the Oregon side is practically closed, while there is no limit on the Washington side of any kind, and no one can tell what the courts will decide as to the very statutes under which this action and non-action result. Meanwhile very few salmon reach the spawning grounds, and probably four years hence the fisheries will amount to nothing; and this comes from a struggle between the associated, or gill-net, fishermen on the one hand, and the owners of the fishing wheels up the river.

On the Columbia River, the Chief Joseph Dam completed in 1955 completely blocks salmon migration to the upper Columbia River system.

The Fraser River salmon population was affected by the 1914 slide caused by the Canadian Pacific Railway at Hells Gate. The 1917 catch was one quarter of the 1913 catch.

The origin of the word for "salmon" was one of the arguments about the location of the origin of the Indo-European languages.

== Mythology ==
The salmon is an important creature in several strands of Celtic mythology and poetry, which often associated them with wisdom and venerability. In Irish folklore, fishermen associated salmon with fairies and thought it was unlucky to refer to them by name. In Irish mythology, a creature called the Salmon of Knowledge plays a key role in the tale The Boyhood Deeds of Fionn. In the tale, the Salmon will grant powers of knowledge to whoever eats it, and is sought by poet Finn Eces for seven years. Finally Finn Eces catches the fish and gives it to his young pupil, Fionn mac Cumhaill, to prepare it for him. However, Fionn burns his thumb on the salmon's juices, and he instinctively puts it in his mouth. In so doing, he inadvertently gains the Salmon's wisdom. Elsewhere in Irish mythology, the salmon is also one of the incarnations of both Tuan mac Cairill and Fintan mac Bóchra.

Salmon also feature in Welsh mythology. In the prose tale Culhwch and Olwen, the Salmon of Llyn Llyw is the oldest animal in Britain, and the only creature who knows the location of Mabon ap Modron. After speaking to a string of other ancient animals who do not know his whereabouts, King Arthur's men Cai and Bedwyr are led to the Salmon of Llyn Llyw, who lets them ride its back to the walls of Mabon's prison in Gloucester.

In Norse mythology, after Loki tricked the blind god Höðr into killing his brother Baldr, Loki jumped into a river and transformed himself into a salmon to escape punishment from the other gods. When they held out a net to trap him he attempted to leap over it but was caught by Thor who grabbed him by the tail with his hand, and this is why the salmon's tail is tapered.

Salmon are central spiritually and culturally to Native American mythology on the Pacific coast, from the Haida and Coast Salish peoples, to the Nuu-chah-nulth peoples in British Columbia.
