= Barry Islands =

Island group in Nunavut, Canada

- Location within Nunavut Location within Canada

Geography
- Location: Bathurst Inlet
- Coordinates: 67°32′N 108°10′W
- Archipelago: Canadian Arctic Archipelago
- Major islands: Algak Island, Kanuyak Island
- Area: 326 km^{2} (126 sq mi)

Administration
- Canada
- Territory: Nunavut
- Region: Kitikmeot

Demographics
- Population: Uninhabited

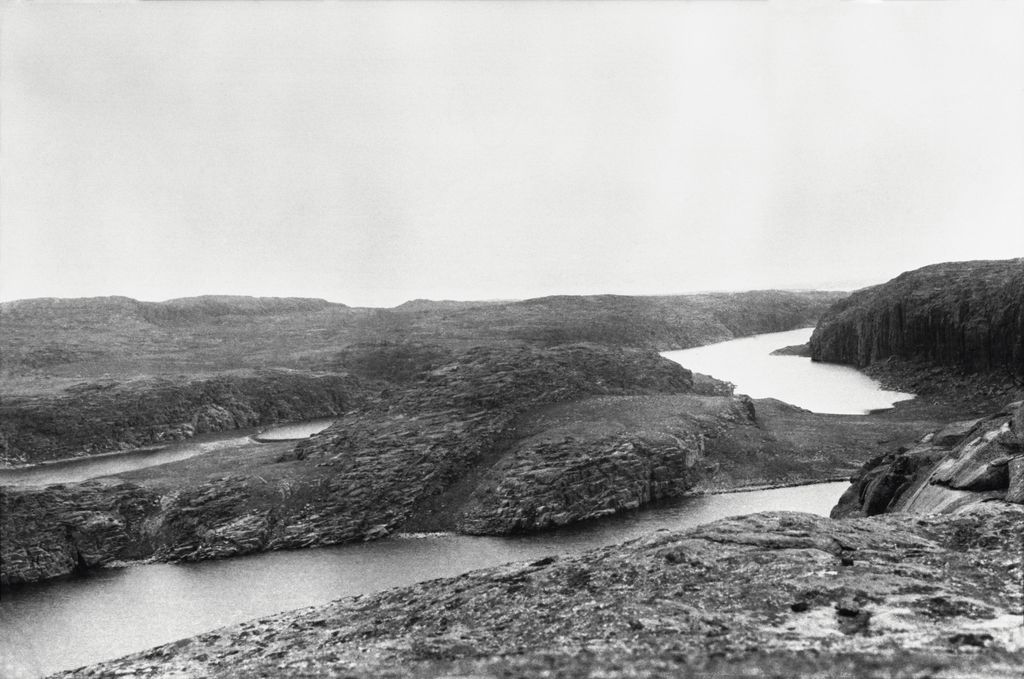
John Franklin's 'portage' on Barry Island

The uninhabited Barry Islands are members of the Canadian Arctic Archipelago in the Kitikmeot Region, Nunavut. They are located in Bathurst Inlet, southeast of Wollaston Point.

Its two major islands are Algak Island and Kanuyak Island.
