= Bathurst Inlet Port and Road Project =

Construction project in Canada

The Bathurst Inlet Port is placed on the point on the west bank of the inlet, just south of the Arctic Circle.

The Bathurst Inlet Port and Road Project is a plan to build an all-weather road from Bathurst Inlet in Nunavut to a complex of mines that are approximately equidistant between Bathurst Inlet and Yellowknife, NWT. There are no paved roads between Yellowknife and the mines, so they have relied on shipping supplies to the mines over winter-time ice roads. However, in 2005, there was a particularly warm winter, and the ice roads weren't safe for a long enough period to bring in supplies.

A consortium of seven mining companies sponsored environmental impact studies to construct a deep-water port in Bathurst Inlet.

A plan referred to the Nunavut Impact Review Board in May 2004 projected a capacity to moor vessels of up to 50,000 tonnes. In this earlier plan the Bathurst Inlet Road would be an ice road, like that from Yellowknife, not an all-weather road as in post-2005 proposals, following the failure of the ice road to freeze early enough to allow transport of a whole year's worth of supplies.

The project was put on hold in 2008. It was re-initiated, in 2012.

By 2013 three mining companies were the proponents of the road: GlencoreXstrata, Sabina Gold and Silver Corporation.

Nunatsiaq reported that the project failed an environmental review in 2016, but passed with a revised proposal in 2017. They reported the port facility was substantially completed, by September 2018, with only a single certification required before it could open for business. They reported that the port cost $24 million CAD.
