= Tariyunnuaq =

Arctic waterway in Nunavut, Canada

- Location within Nunavut
- Location: Bathurst Inlet, Nunavut
- Coordinates: 68°10′31″N 107°10′22″W
- Ocean/sea sources: Arctic Ocean
- Basin countries: Canada
- Settlements: Uninhabited

Tariyunnuaq formerly Melville Sound is an Arctic waterway in the Kitikmeot Region, Nunavut, Canada.

It is located south of Kiillinnguyaq, and north of the main part of the Nunavut mainland. To the west it opens into Bathurst Inlet.
