= Qannuyak (Barry Islands) =

Island in Nunavut, Canada

- Location within Nunavut Location within Canada

Geography
- Location: Bathurst Inlet
- Coordinates: 67°20′47″N 107°57′10″W
- Archipelago: Barry Islands, Arctic Archipelago

Administration
- Canada
- Territory: Nunavut
- Region: Kitikmeot

Demographics
- Population: Uninhabited

Qannuyak formerly Kanuyak Island is a member of the Barry Islands within the Arctic Archipelago in the Kitikmeot Region, Nunavut. It is located in Bathurst Inlet. Other islands in the vicinity include Igluhugyuk, Iqalulialuk, Algaq, Shoe Island, and Aupilaktuq.
