= Patsy Klengenberg Island =

Island in Nunavut, Canada

- Location within Nunavut Location within Canada

Geography
- Location: Bathurst Inlet
- Coordinates: 68°10′N 108°47′W
- Archipelago: Arctic Archipelago

Administration
- Canada
- Territory: Nunavut
- Region: Kitikmeot

Demographics
- Population: Uninhabited

Patsy Klengenberg Island is an uninhabited island within the Arctic Archipelago in the Kitikmeot Region, Nunavut. It is located in Bathurst Inlet. Other islands in the vicinity include Lewes Island, Marcet Island, and Walrus Island.

It is named after Patsy Klengenberg, son of trader Christian Klengenberg, and interpreter to Diamond Jenness during the Canadian Arctic Expedition of 1913-1916.
