= Fruiting body (disambiguation) =

A fruiting body is the multicellular structure of an organism on which spore-producing structures, such as basidia or asci, are born.

Fruiting body may also refer to:

- Fruiting body (bacteria), the aggregation of myxobacterial cells when nutrients are scarce
- Fruiting body (slime mold), the sorophore and sorus
