= Bathurst Inlet =

Inlet on the northern coast of Canada

Kiluhiqtuq
- Bathurst Inlet
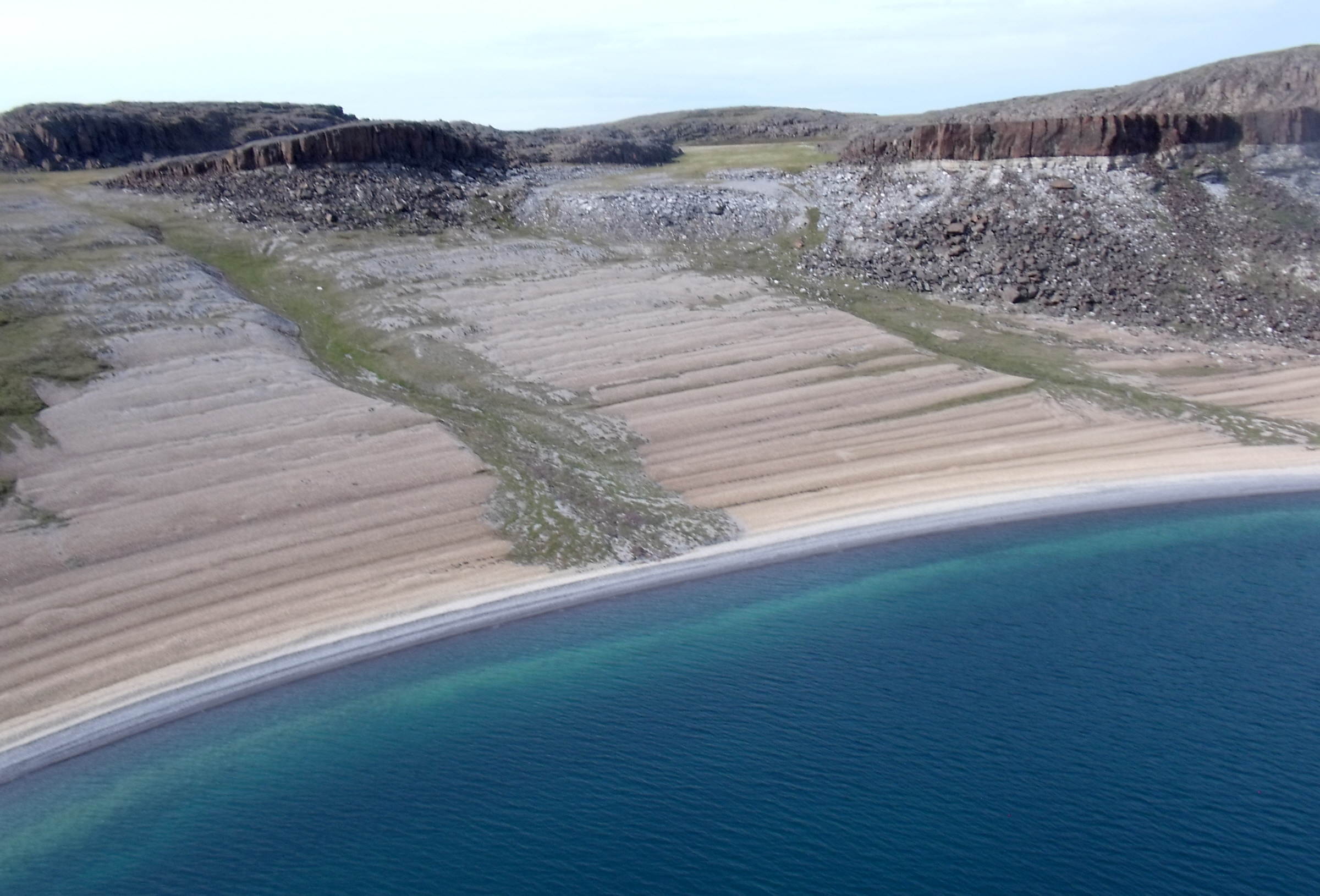
- Beach at the entrance of Bathurst Inlet showing layering due to glacial rebound

- Kiluhiqtuq Kiluhiqtuq (Canada)
- Interactive map of Kiluhiqtuq
- Location: Nunavut
- Coordinates: 67°39′15″N 108°28′09″W
- Type: Inlet
- River sources: Burnside and Western rivers
- Primary outflows: Coronation Gulf
- Ocean/sea sources: Arctic Ocean
- Basin countries: Canada
- Settlements: Bathurst Inlet, Nunavut, Umingmaktok

Bathurst Inlet, officially Kiluhiqtuq, is a deep inlet in Nunavut, located along the northern coast of the Canadian mainland, at the east end of Coronation Gulf, into which the Burnside and Western rivers empty. The name, or its native equivalent Kingoak (Qingaut, nose mountain), is also used to identify the community of Bathurst Inlet located on the shore. Tariyunnuaq, previously Melville Sound, opens into the eastern side of the inlet at Cape Croker, west of the Hurd Islands.

== Plans for a deep-water port ==
A consortium of seven mining companies sponsored environmental impact studies to construct a deep-water port in Bathurst Inlet.

Their plans included building a 211 kilometres (131 miles) road connecting the port to their mines. The port would serve vessels of up to 25,000 tonnes (25,000 long tons; 28,000 short tons).

A plan referred to the Nunavut Impact Review Board in May 2004 projected a capacity to moor vessels of up to 50,000 t (49,000 long tons; 55,000 short tons).

In this earlier plan the Bathurst Inlet Road would be an ice road, like parts if the Tibbitt to Contwoyto Winter Road, from Yellowknife, not an all-weather road as in post-2005 proposals, following the failure of the ice road to freeze early enough to allow transport of a whole year's worth of supplies.

Original consortium members
Corporation	Mine site	Notes
Xstrata	Hackett River Mine	Silver and zinc
Sabina Gold & Silver	Back River Project	
Zinifex	Izok Lake Mine	Copper and zinc
Rio Tinto	Diavik Diamond Mine	Diamonds
Miramar Mining		
Dundee Precious Metals		
BHP	Ekati Diamond Mine	Diamonds
De Beers		

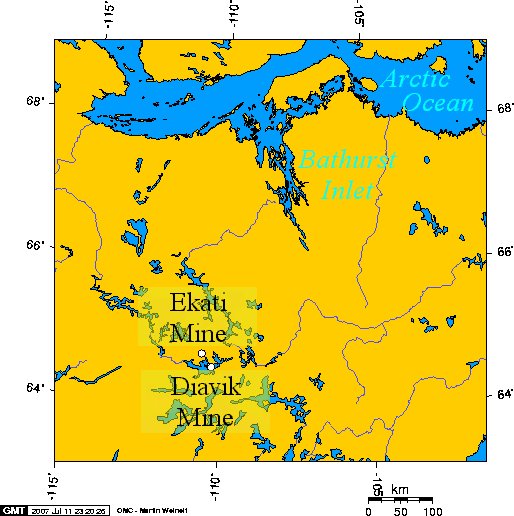
Lambert Projection showing Bathurst Inlet, Nunavut, and environs

In 2008 several of the companies dropped out.

In August 2013 Bathurst Inlet Port and Road Project (BIPR), a joint venture composed of GlencoreXstrata, Sabina Gold and Silver Corporation, presented continued plans for facilities at the Grays Bay Port that would "include a dock, concentration storage shed, fuel storage facilities and a camp. These facilities will support storage of concentrate, loading of bulk-carrier ships, and re-supply of fuel and goods for the Project." The project that was first proposed in 2003 has been subject to changes in demands made by the Nunavut Impact Review Board regarding Environmental Impact Study.

=== Environmental issues ===
Environmental groups have raised concerns over the impact the road would have on the annual migration of the Bathurst caribou herd. There are four barren-ground caribou herds in this area of the Northwest Territories—Cape Bathurst, Bluenose West, Bluenose East and Bathurst caribou herd. The Bluenose East caribou herd began a recovery with a population of approximately 122,000 in 2010, which is being credited to the establishment of Tuktut Nogait National Park. According to T. Davison 2010, CARMA 2011, the three other herds "declined 84-93% from peak sizes in the mid-1980s and 1990s.
