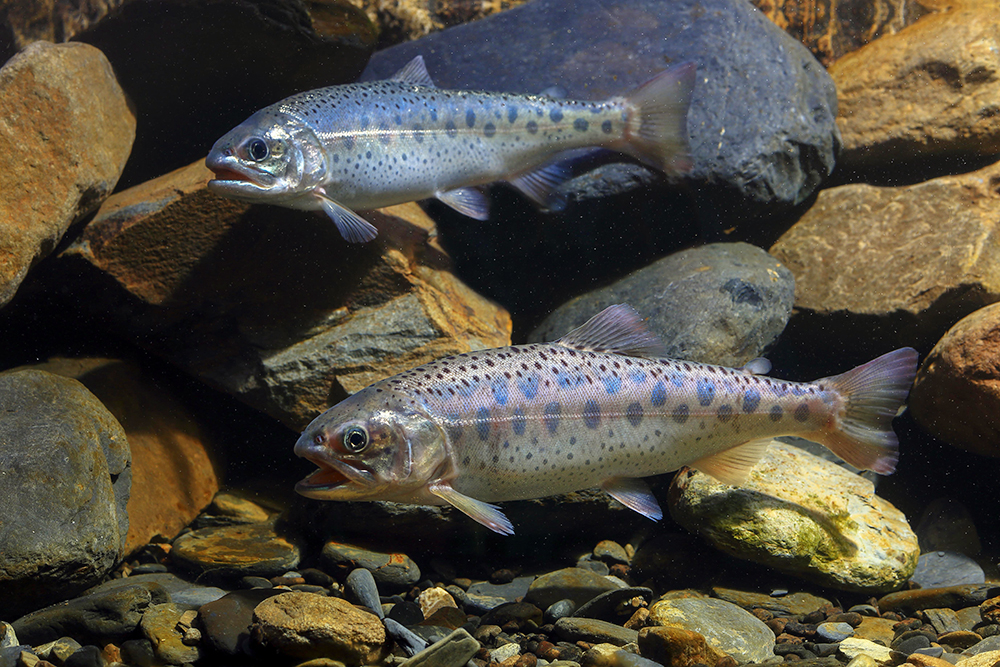
- Adults
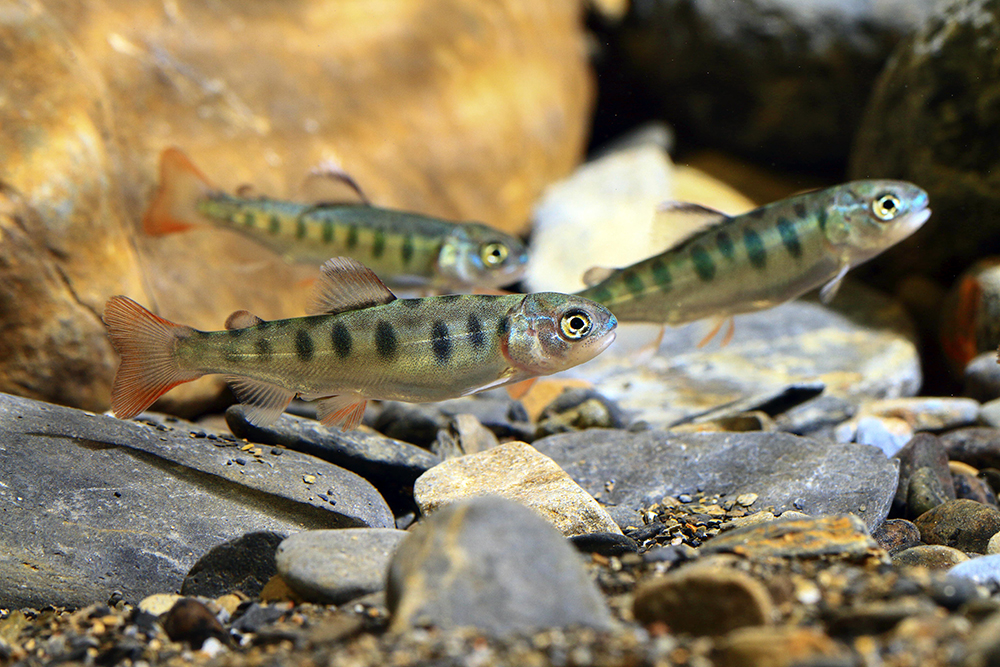
- Juveniles

Conservation status
- Critically Endangered (IUCN 3.1)

Scientific classification
- Kingdom: Animalia
- Phylum: Chordata
- Class: Actinopterygii
- Division: Teleostei
- Order: Salmoniformes
- Family: Salmonidae
- Genus: Oncorhynchus
- Species: O. masou
- Subspecies: O. m. formosanus

Trinomial name
- Oncorhynchus masou formosanus (D. S. Jordan & Ōshima, 1919)

Synonyms
- Salmo formosanus Jordan & Oshima, 1919; Oncorhynchus formosanus (Jordan & Oshima, 1919)

= Oncorhynchus masou formosanus =

Subspecies of fish

Oncorhynchus masou formosanus, commonly known as the Formosan landlocked salmon, cherry salmon, Taiwanese trout (Japanese: タイワンマス, romanized: taiwan masu), Tsugitaka trout (次高鱒, tsugitaka masu), Lishan trout (Chinese: 梨山鱒, after its native Lishan area in Heping District, Taichung) or Slamaw trout (from Slamaw, the indigenous Tayal name for Lishan), is an endangered freshwater fish endemic to the mountain stream valleys between the Xueshan and Central Ranges of Taiwan. It is the southernmost subspecies of masu salmon (Oncorhynchus masou), and one of the most tropically distributed salmonids along with the Mexican golden trout and Mexican rainbow trout.

== Description ==
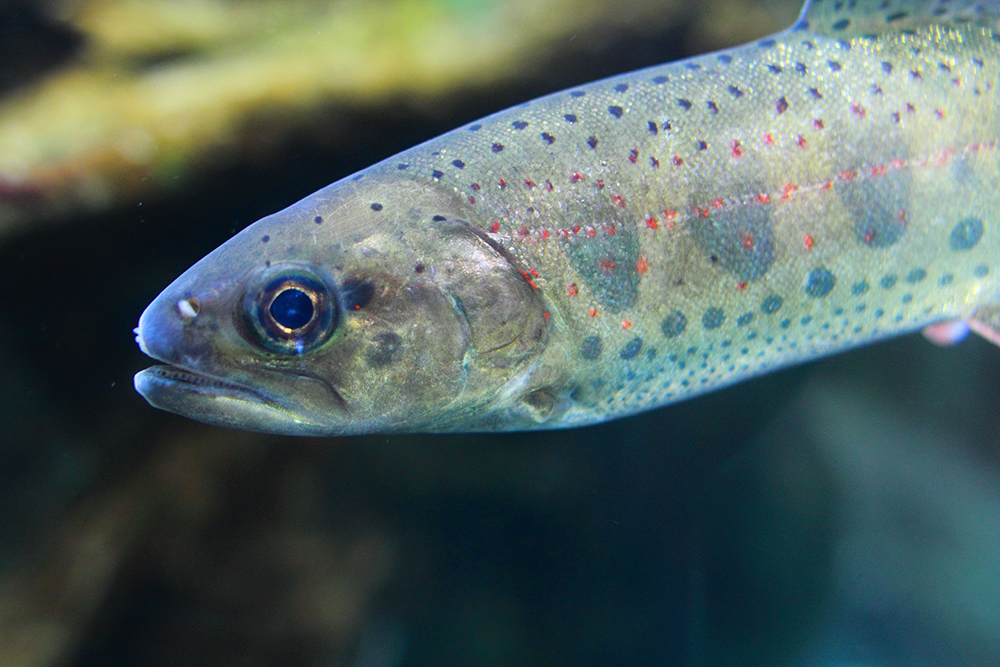
Head

Adult Formosan salmon are about 30 cm (1 ft) in length, while juveniles are about 15 cm (5.9 in) long on average. Adults can grow up to 57 cm in length at a maximum. It has a dark green body with a silver belly, with nine elliptical dark spots and 11-13 smaller black spots on each side of the body. The male displays a dark red color on the side during mating seasons. In addition to the white and silver coloration on their ventral body, adults have yellow-orange colored sides. The top of the fish is also a green color and spotted with black dots dorsally. The head is green on top with a silver coloration around the eyes and operculum. In adults, the caudal fin displays a shallow fork and is homocercal. Pelvic, anal, pectoral, and dorsal fins are present, with the anterior and posterior dorsal fins clearly separated. This species has a clearly defined operculum flap and dark operculum spot posterior to the eye. Dorsal, anal, and ventral adipose fins are typically a silver green color and pectoral and pelvic fins are yellow. They also exhibit branchiostegal rays and gill rakers, but the basibranchial tooth is absent. The ratio of body length to head length in adults is typically 4.20, body length to body height ratio is 3.48, head length to snout length ratio is 4.41, head length to eye diameter ratio is 3.43, and head length to inter orbital width ratio is 4.12. The lateral line is also present in this species and the body is covered in cycloid scales.

== Taxonomy ==
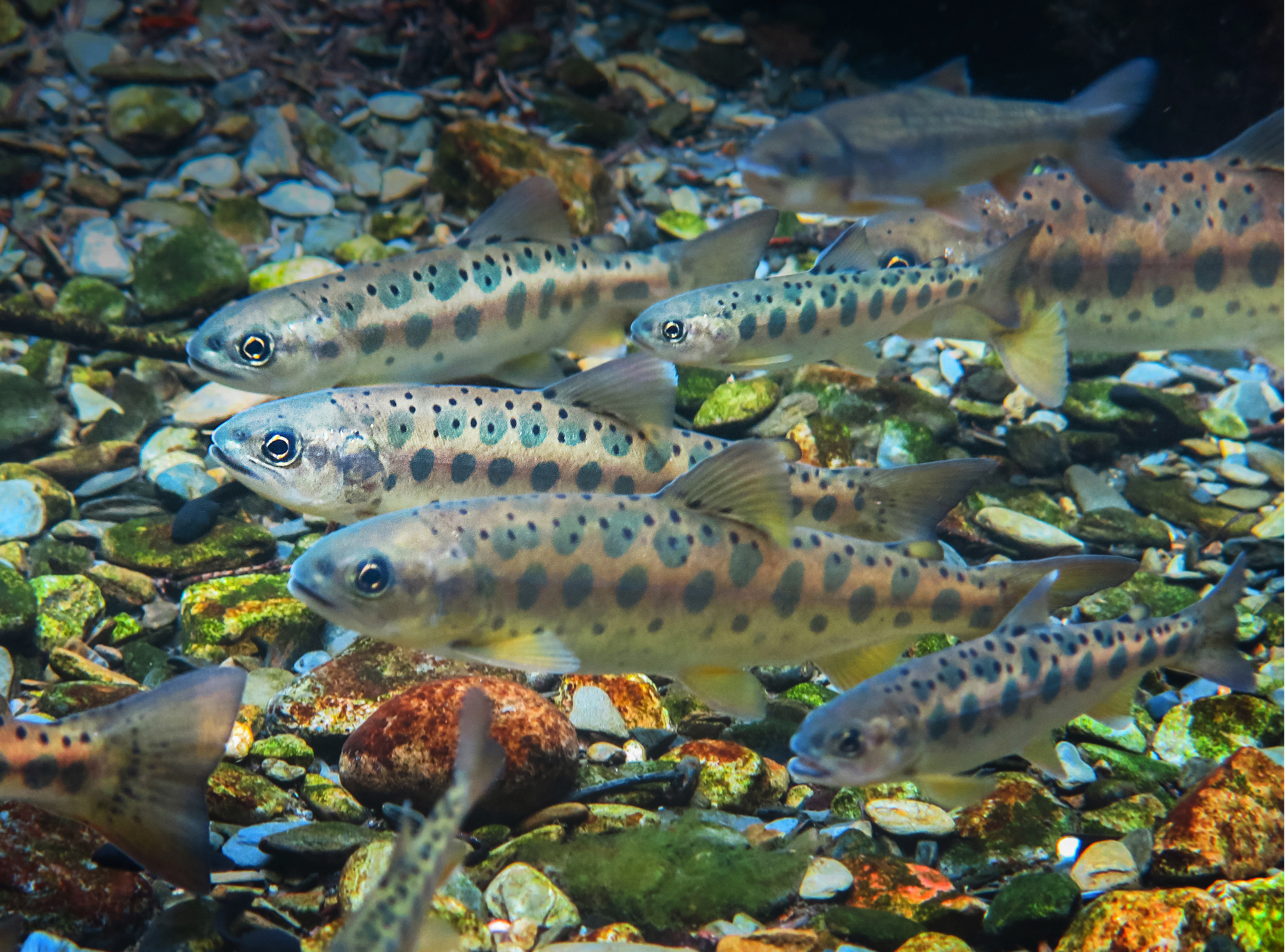
A group of Taiwanese trout

The Formosan landlocked salmon is a part of the cherry salmon complex. There is minimal sexual dimorphism in Formosan landlocked salmon, and overall minimal morphological differentiation between this species and other species within the cherry salmon complex, such as the landlocked dwarf form. As a result, methods such as loop-mediated isothermal amplification and PCR-derived tests are used to differentiate similar-looking species and sexes for conservation and management purposes. However, there is one key sexual dimorphism, which presents in a secondary sex characteristic of males during mating season, during which the lower portion of the jaw becomes upturned. However, there the specific taxonomic rank of the endemic Taiwanese salmon is in dispute. Some authors consider it not distinct from the nominate cherry salmon (O. masou masou), others as a regional subspecies O. masou formosanus, and still others list is as a full species O. formosanus.

== Distribution ==
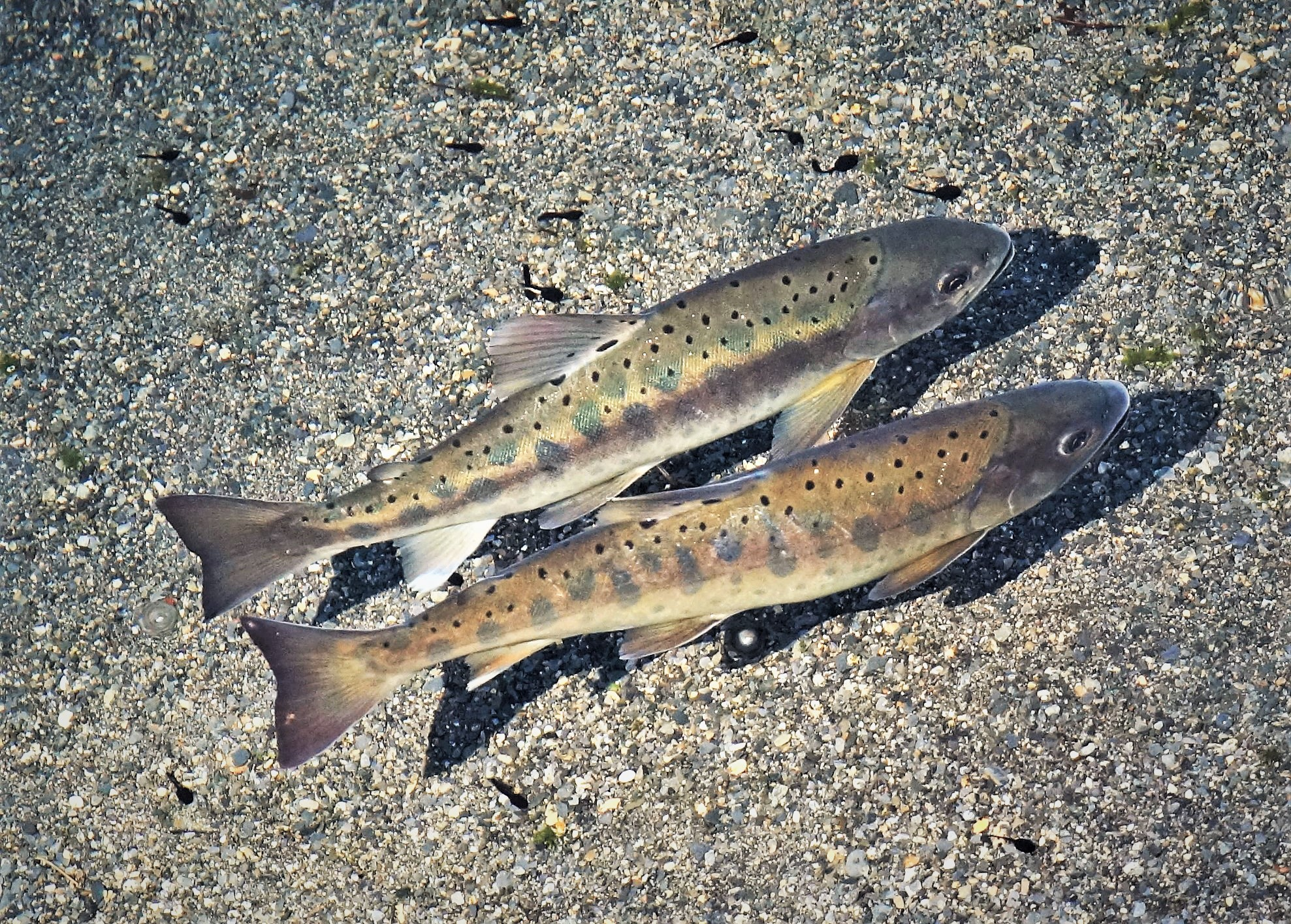
At Shei-Pa National Park in Taiwan

Formosan landlocked salmon are a riparian freshwater fish species that inhabit streams and tributaries of an alpine river habitat. They are native to Taiwan's Lishan Mountain Range, and are endemic to mountain streams between the Xueshan Mountain Range and Central Mountain Range in Taiwan. They were found to have migrated into Taiwan by way of the Tsushima Strait, a channel in the Japan Sea between 10 and 80 million years ago, as demonstrated by analysis of mitochondrial DNA samples. This species began with an anadromous life history strategy, but after it colonized the Tachia River's upper streams and became geographically isolated as glaciers retreated, it converted to a landlocked species. It is now restricted to the lower Wuling Creek and Chichiawan Creek tributaries, a reduction from its past abundance in many tributaries at elevations of above 4500 feet and upstream of the Tachia River. They typically utilize plunge and backwater pools created by dams that trap silt. Generally, this species is limited in habitat by water temperature tolerance, with an upper threshold of 17 degrees celsius. However, its use of microhabitats within the river valley is dependent on season and fish size. Slower and wider sections of the river have more shelter and attract younger and smaller individuals during the summer. Also during summer, adults gravitate toward upstream regions of higher diversity of microhabitats. During winter, water level reductions push adults into plunge pools.

Formosan landlocked salmon living in their most densely populated range upstream of the Tachia River live in streams in an alpine environment surrounded by dense forests. The streams they inhabit within the Tachia River are, on average, 12 degrees celsius with an annual average precipitation level of 1642 mm. The riparian forest surrounding the Tachia River is developed for agricultural use in the lower reaches, so the river is moderately influenced by agriculture. Canopy cover of the stream is between 50% and 90% across the entire stream. In the summer, the river is dominated by boulders as the substrate, and the primary substrates are pebbles and cobbles in the winter months.

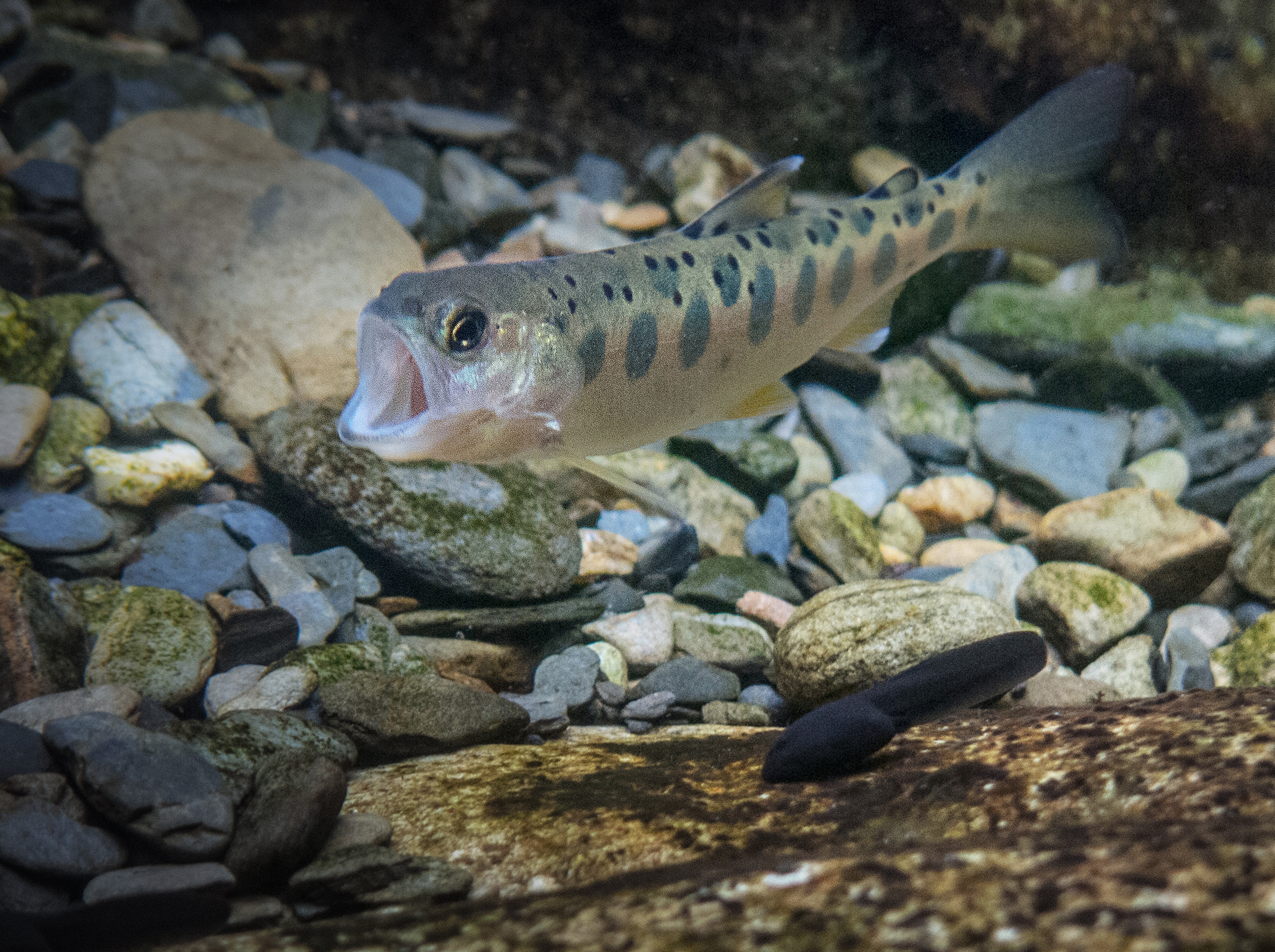

Within the range inhabited by Formosan landlocked salmon, the species is heavily influenced by how much suitable habitat is available to it. A fish's energy allocation is determined by the temperature of the surrounding water, and its ability to compete for suitable habitat within its optimal temperature range is determined by its body size. In the Chichiawan Stream, an important and large portion of the Formosan landlocked salmon range, habitat selection was found to be significantly different in summer versus winter months. In the warm months (May through November), the species was mainly found in habitats with deeper waters and higher current velocity, as well as smaller substrate. Substrate was mainly boulders and rocks. During colder water temperature months (the remainder of the year), the salmon preferentially selected habitats with shallower waters, slower current velocities, and larger substrate. These differences in habitat selection were most prominent in larger fish, and smaller fish tended to gravitate towards riffles and runs with microhabitats exhibiting more moderate conditions in regards to depth, current velocity, and substrate size.

In its endemic region of the Tachia River, Formosan landlocked salmon was abundant in six distinct tributaries of the river at one time. However, hydrological alterations, damming, and land development for agricultural purposes has degraded the habitat, resulting in a drop in abundance to approximately 200 individuals in 1984. The Taiwanese government has responded to decreased abundance by facilitating artificial propagation programs, but the species' numbers continued to decline in the 1980s and 1990s. By the early 2000s, Formosan landlocked salmon populations had somewhat recovered, with a 2002 census showing a peak number of 4,221 individuals across all populations. In 2010, there were approximately 3,629 individuals one year of age or older.

== Ecology ==
Formosan salmon inhabit cold, slow-flowing streams with gently sloping beds. Being a coldwater fish native to the subtropical Taiwan, the fish only thrive at elevations above 1,500 metres (4,900 ft) where the water temperature is consistently below 17 °C (63 °F), such as the Chichiawan Stream and the Kaoshan Stream (formerly named Hsuehshan Stream or Wuling Stream) in the upper reaches of the Dajia River, within the ranges of Shei-Pa National Park. It is a relictual subspecies of the once more widespread masu salmon, landlocked into the highland valleys by the warming of lower Dajia River after the end of the Last Ice Age. Currently, it represents the southernmost natural distribution of any members of the family Salmonidae in Asia.

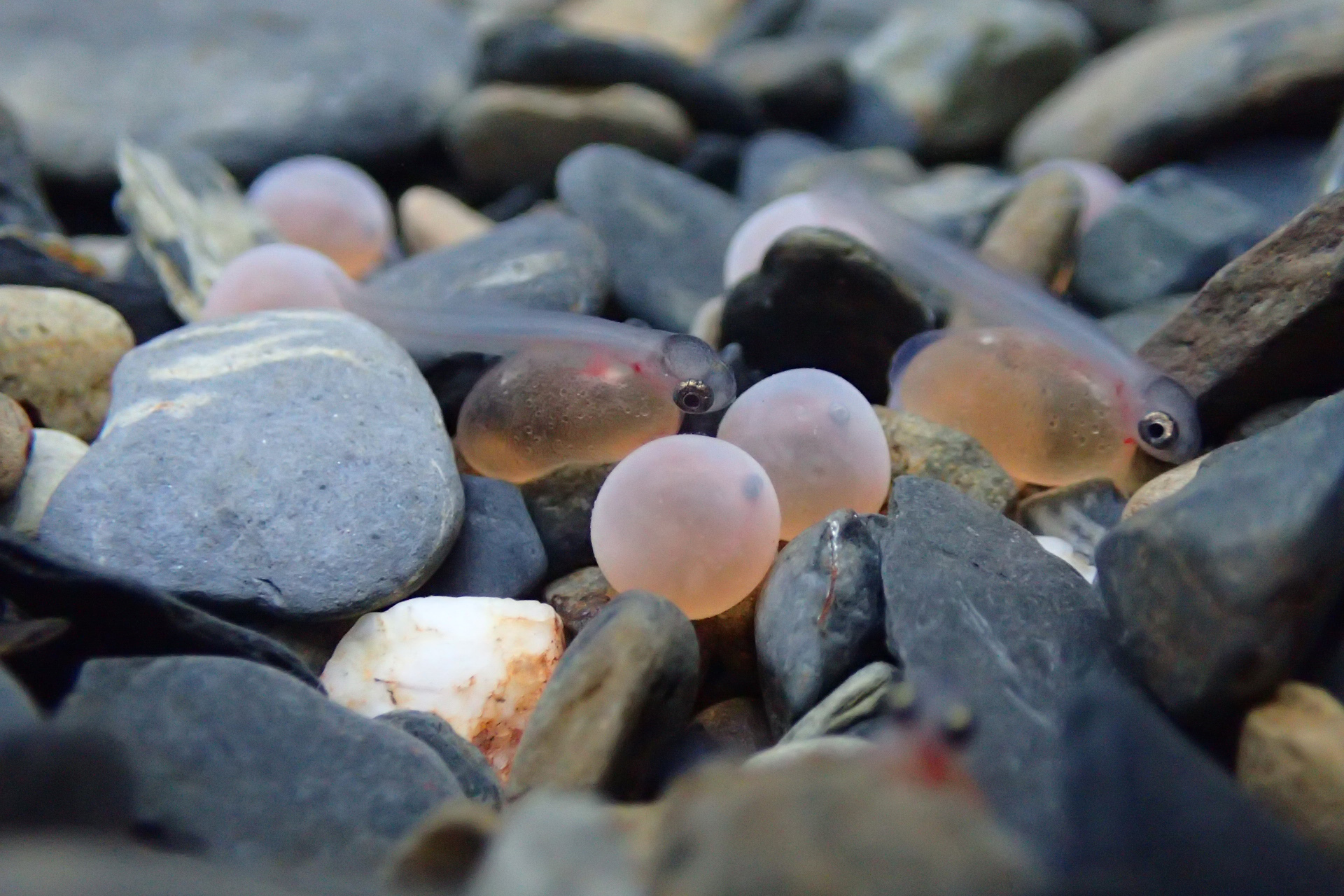
Eggs and fry

Formosan landlocked salmon reproduce by spawning. The most dominant spawning class consists of 2-year-old females, which lay eggs in the second half of October. When spawning, Formosan landlocked salmon use their tail and body to clear silt from the river floor and build oval-shaped nests anywhere from 0.2 cm to 25.6 cm in diameter out of gravel from Tachia river substrate. Water in the spawning range is approximately 0.25 meters deep at a temperature of approximately 11 to 15 degrees celsius. After fertilization, the eggs typically hatch in late November, after 20-30 days of development. As is characteristic of many salmonid species, female reproductive success is determined by the rate at which they process biological resources. Male reproductive success is determined by the number of opportunities to mate with females. Formosan landlocked salmon life expectancy ranges from 4 to 5 years. This species reaches sexual maturity before two years of age, and undergoes its growth in physical size and biomass early in its life cycle. One useful way to estimate salmonid age is through a method typically applied to mixed age-class salmonid cohorts, which is measuring fork length as a proxy for juvenile salmonid age class. Riparian plants also play another important role in the biology of Formosan landlocked salmon survival beyond providing nutrition to the salmons' food sources, aquatic insects. The presence of the vegetation also lowers water temperature to the ideal range and reduces runoff in portions of the river such as the Chichiawan Stream. These ecosystem services are helpful in facilitating the biological functions of the salmon, including reproduction, and protecting the habitat against the impacts on flow regimes due to climate change as well as agricultural development.

== Diet ==
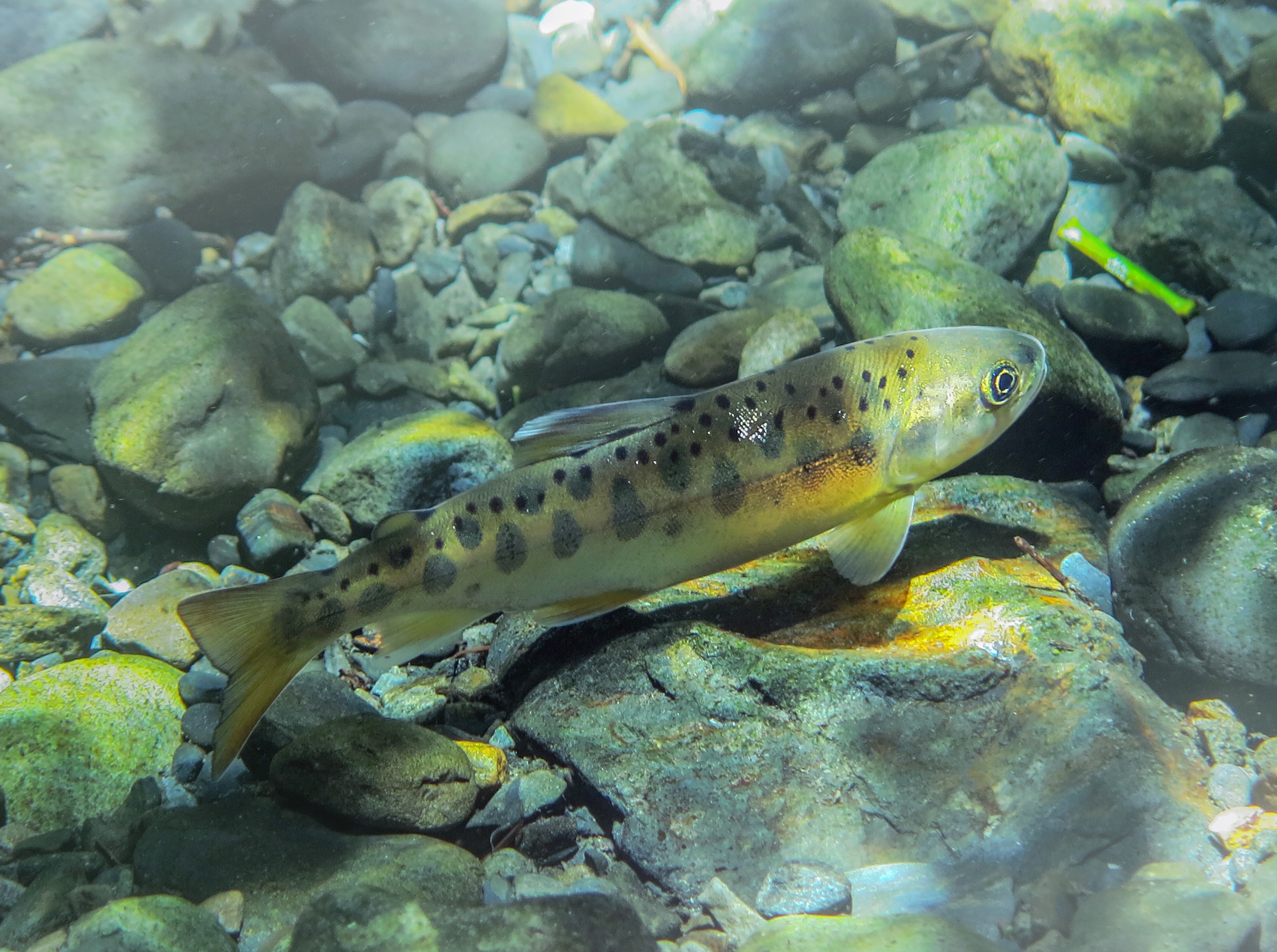
At Shei-Pa National Park in Taiwan

Aquatic insects provide a primary source of nutrition for Formosan landlocked salmon, particularly caddis, mayflies, and stoneflies. The base of the trophic system in the Formosan landlocked salmon's habitat is primarily C3 riparian plants, which comprise the diet of aquatic insects in the filter and gatherer functional feeding groups. These insects form the base of the salmons' diet during the wet season. During the dry season, however, the salmons' diet shifts to the focus on predator aquatic insects as a primary food source. During the summer, Formosan landlocked salmon are primarily sedentary, but they do travel short distances to forage for food. In addition to aquatic invertebrates, Formosan landlocked salmon also rely on terrestrial prey, but the degree to which these prey contribute to their diet varies by fish size. Larger fish rely more heavily on terrestrial prey than do smaller individuals. This illustrates that body size is a key factor in determining Formosan landlocked salmon's feeding habits, because the foraging opportunities available to smaller fish are more limited than those of larger fish. However, aquatic invertebrates remain the most substantial component of Formosan landlocked salmons' diet composition, regardless of size and age.

== Conservation status ==
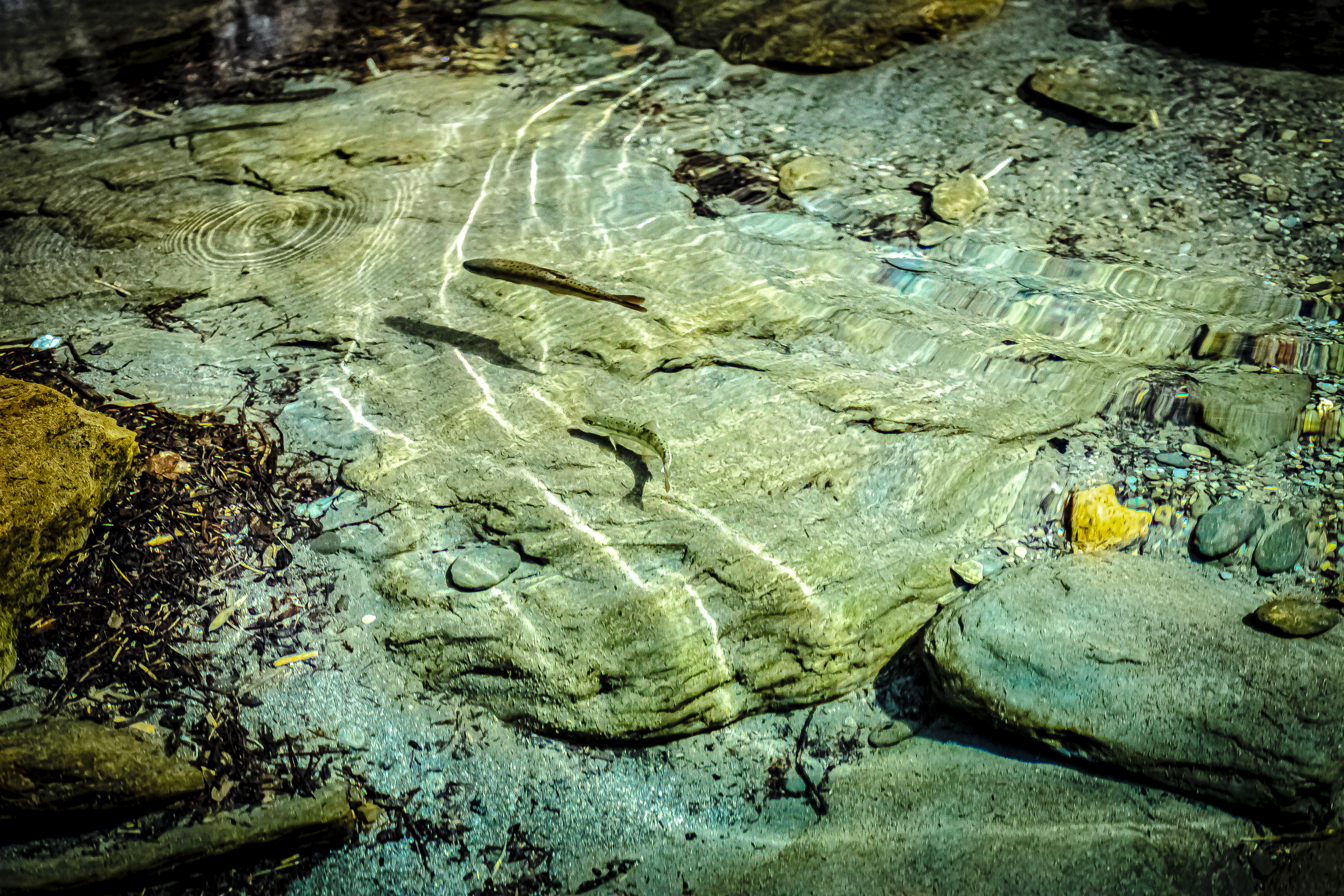
At Taroko National Park

The Formosan salmon is one of the rarest fish in the world, and the current population is critically endangered at high risk for extinction. The Formosan landlocked salmon is currently listed as critically endangered on the IUCN Endangered Species List. The trend of the population is listed as unspecified. It was once a dietary staple among Taiwanese aborigines like the Atayal people, who know this fish by several local names: bunban, mnbang and n'bang. The key threats facing the Formosan landlocked salmon species are primarily human-induced. These include the degradation and destruction of habitat due to human activities such as agricultural development, overexploitation of riparian resources, water and air pollution, and the consequences of climate change and global warming. As a secondary consequence of habitat loss, the population declines of the species have led to reduced genetic diversity within the species, making it more vulnerable to future disruptions and stressors. Commercial fisheries of the Formosan landlocked salmon have been banned by the Taiwanese government. However, the species still provides utilitarian value to humans, who fish for subsistence and sport and the fish is highly valued. In addition to its biological and utilitarian importances, the Formosan landlocked salmon also has cultural significance in its native region of Taiwan. In 1938, the Japanese government designated it as a national treasure. As a result of this distinction, protections including a seasonal fishing moratorium and the prohibition of introduced species in its endemic range were instituted, but these protections were revoked when Taiwan was released from Japanese governance in 1945. Following this period, the species declined significantly before gaining the attention of the Taiwanese government and conservation agencies, which instituted artificial propagation strategies in an attempt to revitalize the population and prevent further declines and habitat destruction.

By 1992, there were only 200 remaining according to official counts. Over the next 20 years, the Taiwanese government, the Shei-Pa National Park Administration, as well as effective conservation efforts in Taiwan, restored the fish population to historical high of 12,587 in 2020. In March 2023, the number of fish once again reached new heights since restoration first started in 1995, with 15,374 counted by the Shei-Pa National Park Administration. Despite the protections already in place, it is critical that future conservation efforts continue to support the growth of Formosan landlocked salmon populations in Taiwan. The upstream watersheds of the Tachia River are in alpine environments, so they are particularly vulnerable to the increased temperatures due to the high degree of solar radiation. As a result, it will be important to monitor salmon populations as water temperatures rise and to implement strategies to mitigate the consequences of climate change.

== Popular culture ==
The salmon is featured on the NTD $2,000 bill.

== See also ==
- List of protected species in Taiwan
- List of endemic species of Taiwan
