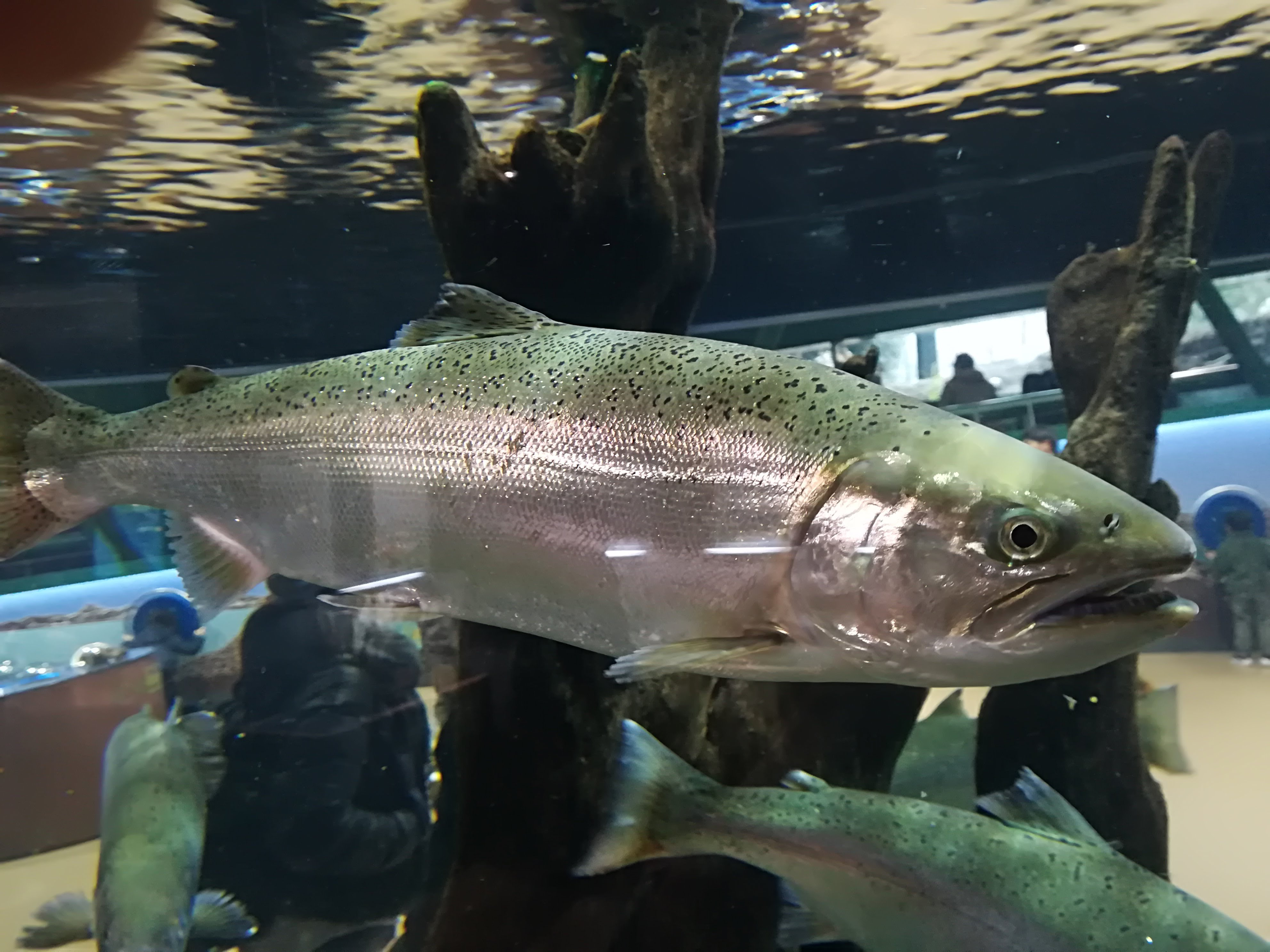
- Adult
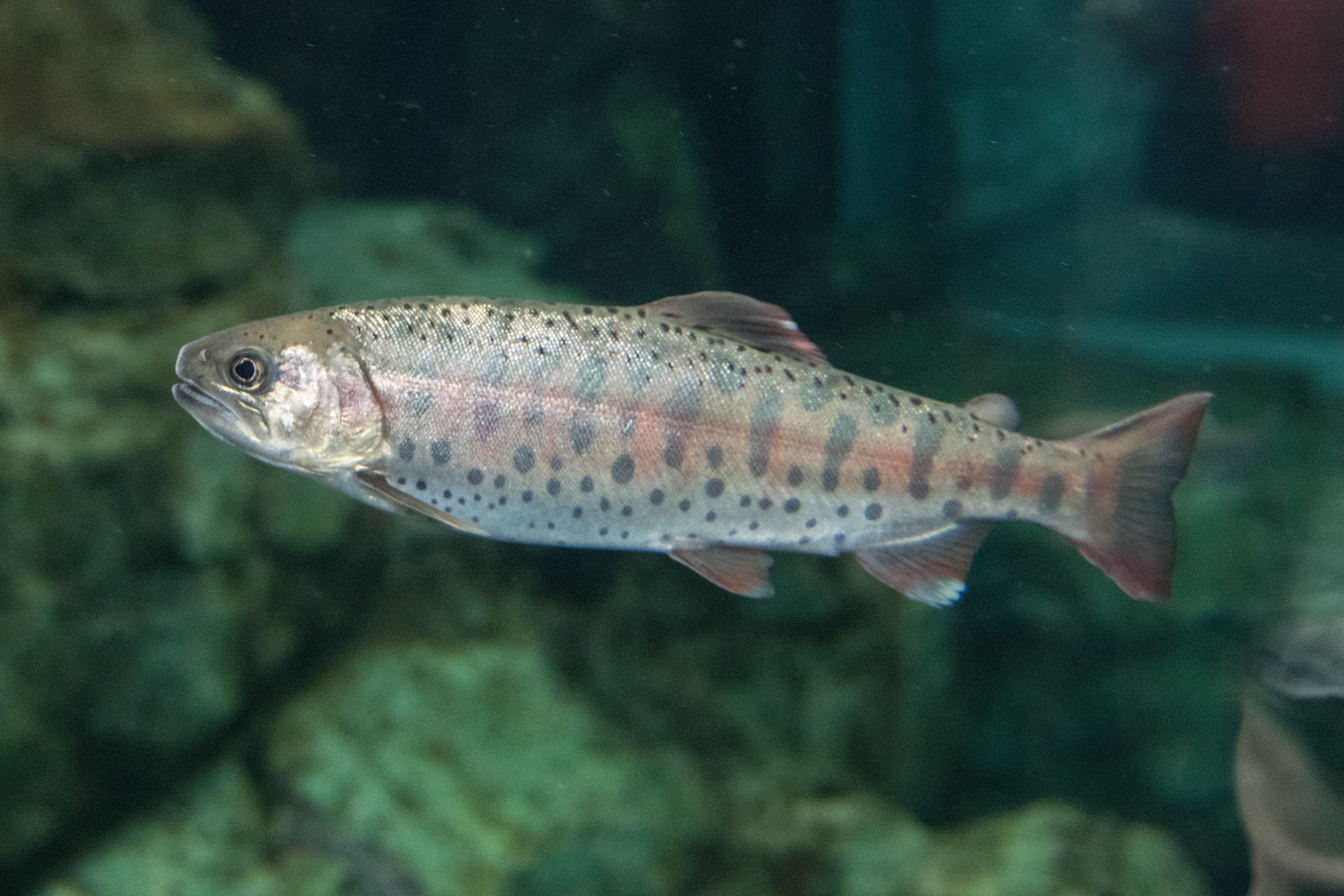
- Juvenile

Conservation status
- Least Concern (IUCN 3.1)

- Endangered (IUCN 2.3)(O. m. ishikawae)

Scientific classification
- Kingdom: Animalia
- Phylum: Chordata
- Class: Actinopterygii
- Division: Teleostei
- Order: Salmoniformes
- Family: Salmonidae
- Genus: Oncorhynchus
- Species: O. masou

Binomial name
- Oncorhynchus masou (Brevoort, 1856)

= Oncorhynchus masou =

Species of salmon

The masu salmon (Oncorhynchus masou), also known as masu (Japanese: マス, lit. 'trout') or cherry trout (桜鱒, サクラマス, sakura masu) in Japan, is a species of salmonid belonging to the genus Oncorhynchus, found in the North Pacific along Northeast/East Asian coasts from the Russian Far East (Primorsky, Kamchatka Peninsula, Sakhalin and Kuril Islands) to south through Korea, Japan and Taiwan. Although generally accepted as a salmon in the West, the fish is actually regarded as a trout in Japan (its most famous native range) as it is the most commonly seen freshwater salmonid in the Japanese archipelago.

A number of subspecies are known, including the widespread nominate subspecies yamame (O. m. masou), the critically endangered Formosan salmon (O. m. formosanus) in landlocked waters of Taiwan, the Biwa trout (O. m. rhodurus) endemic of Lake Biwa, and the anadromous amago (O. m. macrostomus) restricted to western Japan.

== Appearance ==
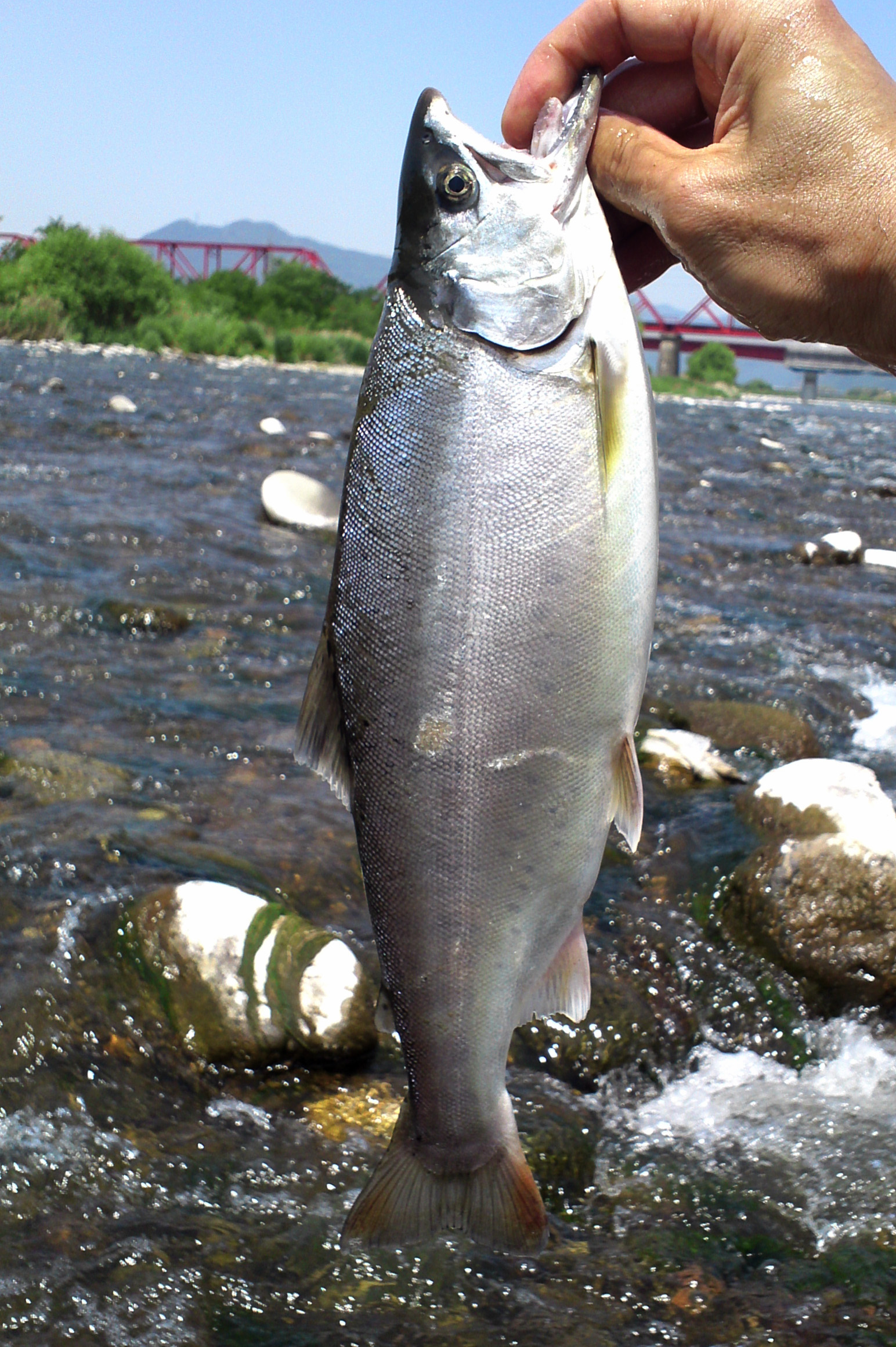
Oncorhynchus masou

A masu salmon which has reached sexual maturity has a darkened back, and the stripes on the body sides become bright red with crimson tinge to merge on the abdomen into one common longitudinal band of lighter color. For this reason, it was given the name cherry salmon.

As adults, masu salmon tend to weigh 2.0 to 2.5 kg (4 lb 7 oz to 5 lb 8 oz) and measure roughly 50 cm (20 in) in length. The maximum size that can be attained by this species (which is in the region of Primorsky Krai) is 71 cm (28 in) long and 9 kg (19 lb 13 oz) in weight.

== Ecology ==
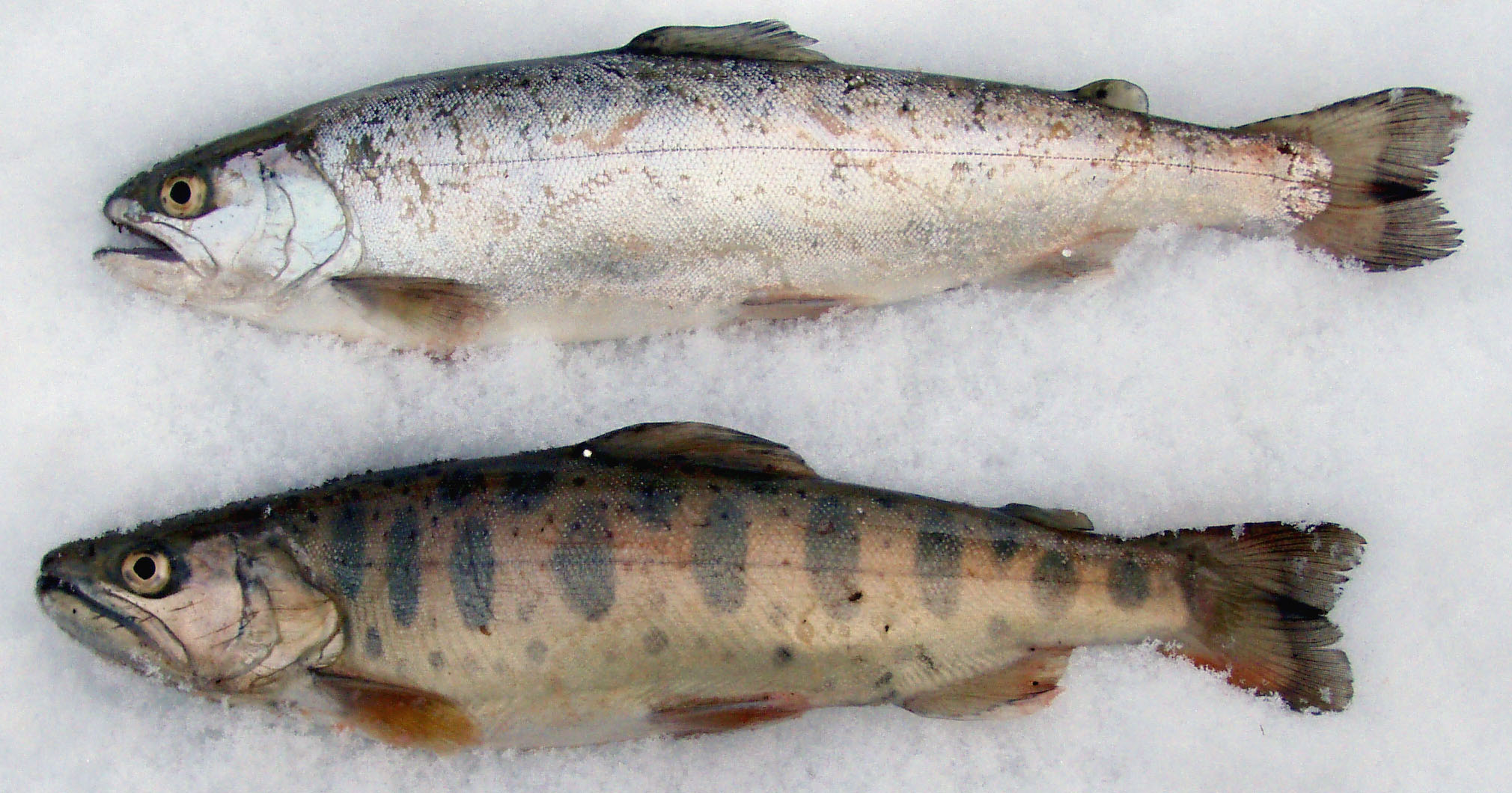

On average, this salmon prefers a temperate climate around the latitude of 65–58°N, and in the sea, it prefers a depth of 0–200 m (0–660 ft).

=== Life cycle ===
Like other Pacific salmon, masu salmon's biological life cycle is subdivided into freshwater and marine periods; in rivers, this species lives from 1 to 3 years and can form living freshwater forms. The sea lifecycle, depending on the age of the young, continues for 2.0 to 3.5 years. In the sea, the masu salmon feeds intensely on crustaceans, less often on young fish. On attaining sexual maturity, in its third to seventh year of life, it enters rivers to spawn. Its spawning run starts earlier than that of other salmon species.

After spawning, most passing fish die, and those that remain alive (preferentially dwarf males) participate in spawning the next year, too. Emerging from the nest, the young do not travel to the sea immediately, but remain in spawning areas, in the upper reaches of rivers, and on shallows with weak currents. The young move to pools and rolls of the river core to feed on chironomids, stone flies, and may fly larvae, and on airborne insects. The masu salmon travels to the ocean in its second, or occasionally even third year of life.

== Economic importance ==
This salmon, like most others, is a highly commercial species caught in fisheries, raised for aquaculture, and sought after as a game fish. It is marketed fresh and frozen and is often eaten broiled or baked.

== Subspecies and morphs ==
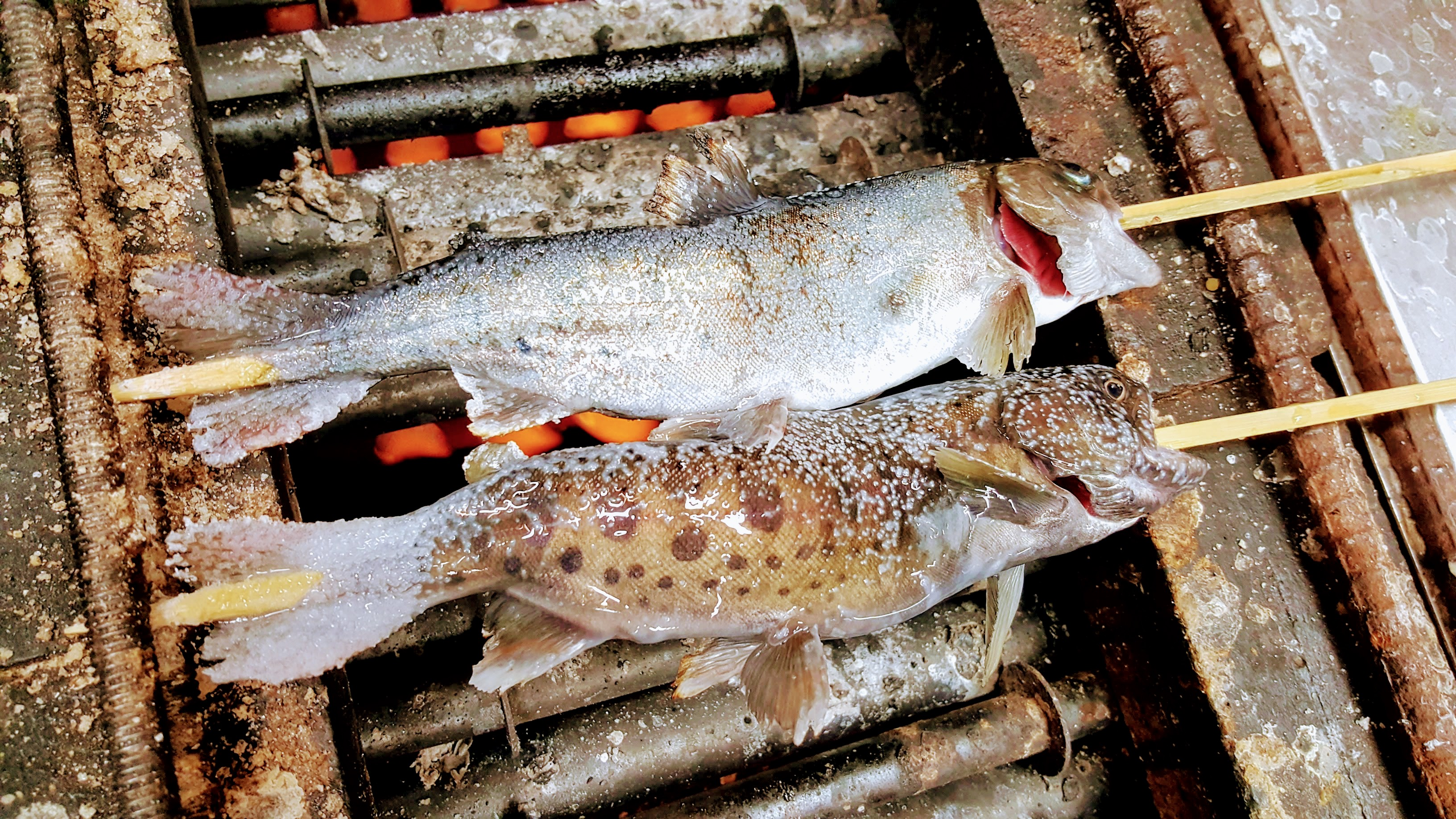
Grilled amago in Kokonoe City

- O. m. masou — Masu salmon, anadromous (sea-run) form; landlocked populations also called yamame (山女魚 ヤマメ)
  - O. m. ishikawae — Satsuki trout (皐月鱒 サツキマス, satsuki masu), black-spotted form; landlocked populations also called amago (雨魚 アマゴ)
  - O. m. var. iwame — Iwame trout (岩女魚 イワメ), recessive spotless form
- O. m. rhodurus — Type specimen is from Lake Ashi (Lake Hakone), previously identified as same species as Biwa trout (O. biwaensis)
- O. m. macrostomus — Red-spotted masu salmon; endemic to western Japan
- O. m. formosanus — Formosan salmon, Lishan trout (Chinese: 梨山鱒) or Slamaw trout (the Tayal name for Lishan), landlocked form endemic to mountainous central Taiwan
