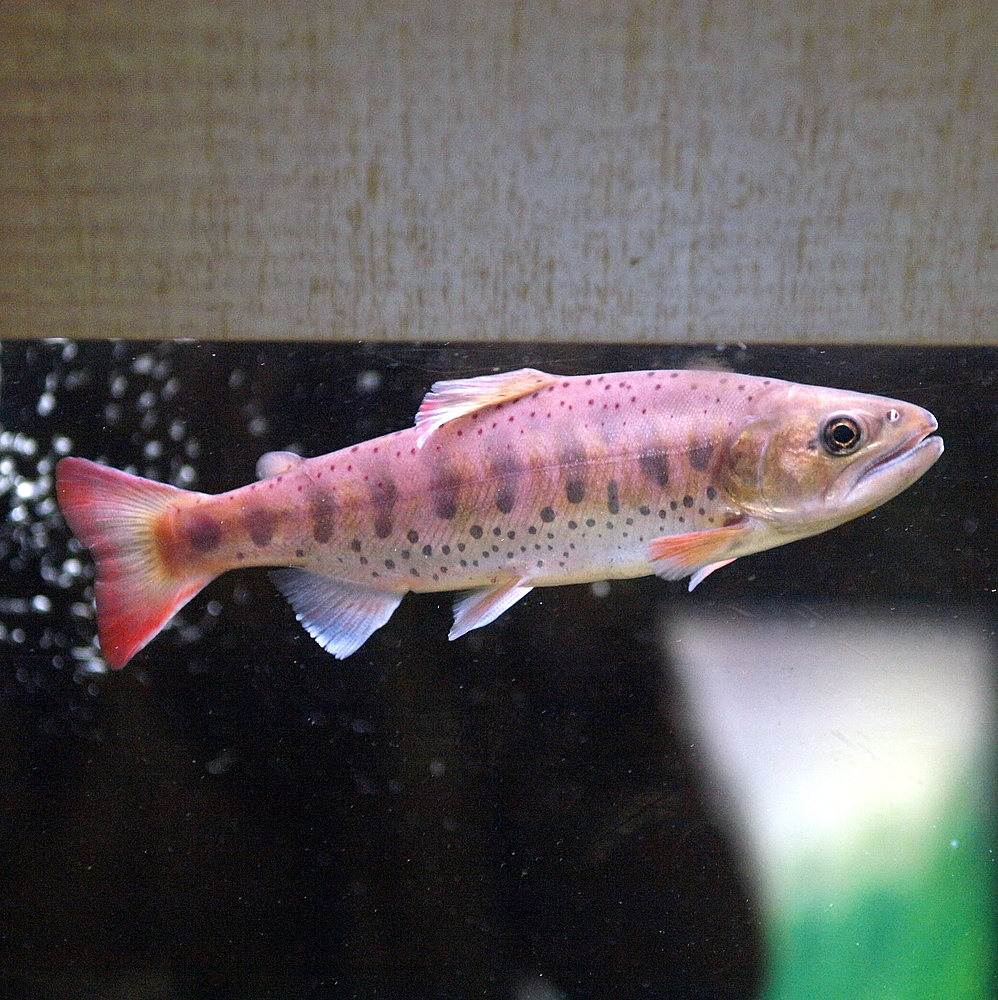

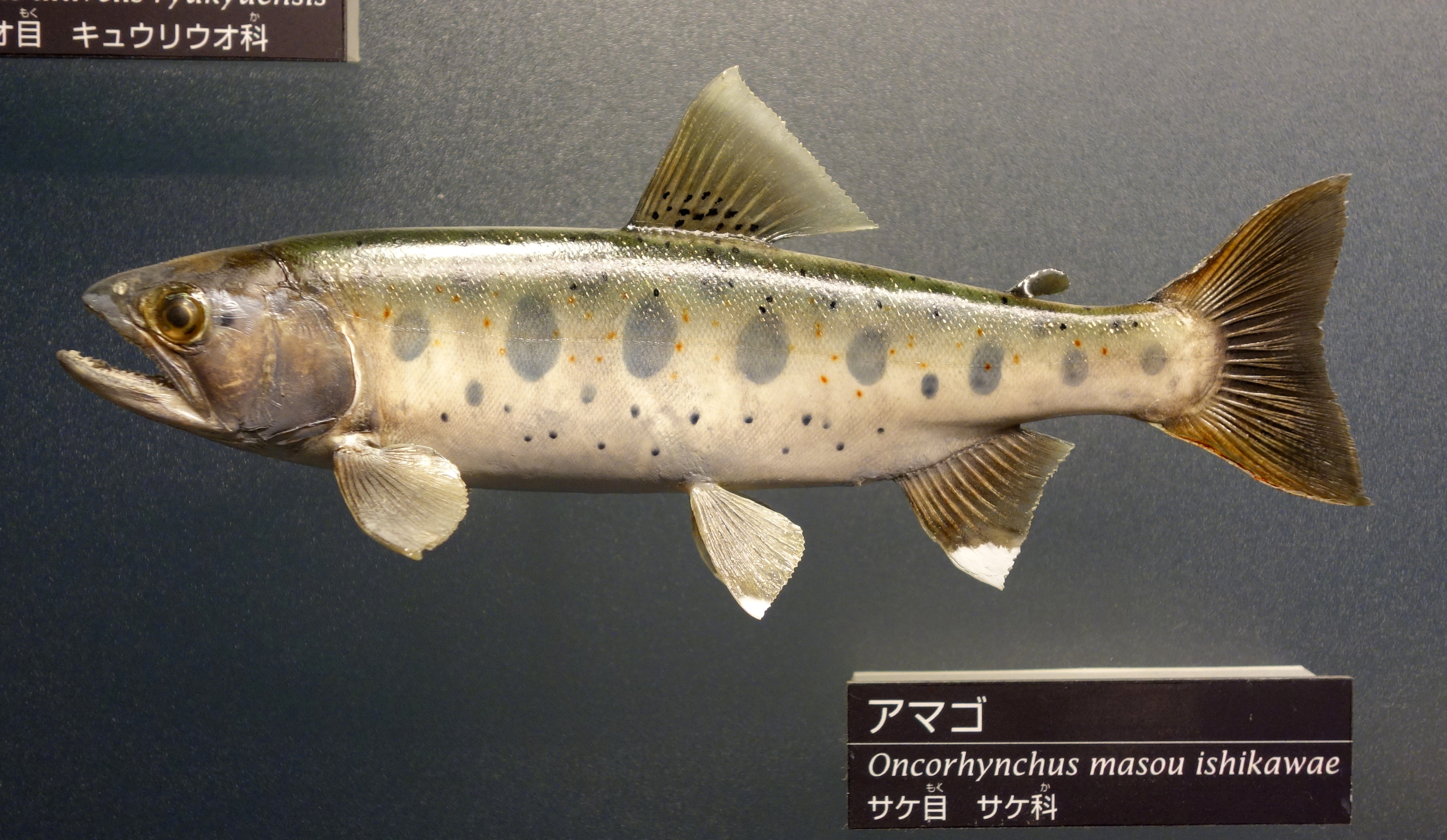

Scientific classification
- Domain: Eukaryota
- Kingdom: Animalia
- Phylum: Chordata
- Class: Actinopterygii
- Order: Salmoniformes
- Family: Salmonidae
- Genus: Oncorhynchus
- Species: O. masou
- Subspecies: O. m. macrostomus

Trinomial name
- Oncorhynchus masou macrostomus (Günther, 1877)

= Oncorhynchus masou macrostomus =

Amago

Subspecies of fish

The amago or the red-spotted masu salmon (Oncorhynchus masou macrostomus) is a salmonid fish endemic to western Japan, and a subspecies of the more widespread Northwest Pacific masu salmon or cherry salmon (Oncorhynchus masou). It is distinguished by the presence of red or vermilion spots on the body along with black ones, while the nominate form O. masou masou, known as the yamame, only has black ones. The amago is distributed in western Japan, on the Pacific side of the Honshu and Shikoku islands, and on the Inland Sea of Japan side of Kyushu. The subspecies is a subject of aquaculture. It can grow up to 50 cm (20 in) length.

There are both anadromous (sea-run) and persistently stream-dwelling populations of the amago. Previously it was considered a subspecies of Oncorhynchus rhodurus, a name that currently only refers to the Biwa trout, which has a restricted distribution within the range of the amago.

== O. m. ishikawae and the satsukimasu salmon ==
Varying scientific nomenclature has been used of the various forms of cherry salmon. The vermilion-spotted amago has been referred to alternatively as O. m. ishikawae Jordan & McGregor, 1925, in Japanese media. The IUCN Red List indicated "Oncorhychus ishikawai " from the Nagara River only, which is within the amago range, and called it satsukimasu salmon. In other sources however the name O. m. ishikawae has been used of the non-anadromous forms of the widespread, black-spotted yamame, and the FishBase lists it as a synonym of O. masou masou that comprises both the anadromous and non-anadromous black-spotted morphs.

The Iwame trout is a recessive unmarked (unspotted) morph that occurs in some upstream, non-migrating populations of the amago.
