= Guzmán Basin =

Endorheic basin in North America

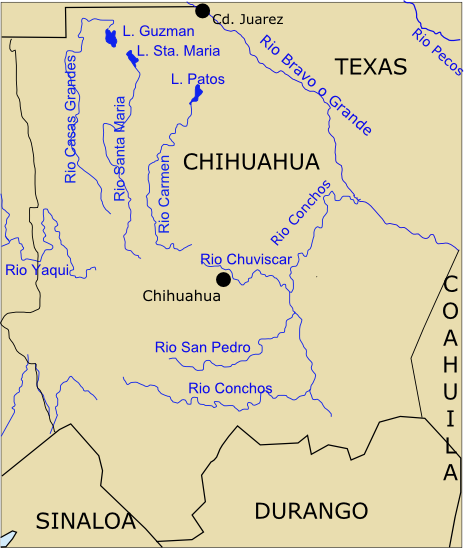
A map showing the southern part with past locations of rivers and lakes in Chihuahua

The Guzmán Basin is an endorheic basin of northern Mexico and the southwestern United States. It occupies the northwestern portion of Chihuahua in Mexico, and extends into southwestern New Mexico in the United States.

Notable rivers of the Guzmán Basin are the Casas Grandes River, which empties into Lake Guzmán, the Santa Maria River, which empties into Lake Santa Maria, the Carmen River, and the Mimbres River of New Mexico.

The Guzmán Basin is home to several endemic and near-endemic fish species, including the Chihuahua chub (Gila nigrescens), Palomas pupfish (Cyprinodon pisteri), Whitefin pupfish (C. albivelis), Perrito de carbonera (C. fontinalis), and Guzmán trout (Oncorhynchus mykiss nelsoni).
