= Mexican native trout =

Trout native to Mexico

Mexican native trout (in Spanish "Truchas Mexicanas")—Mexican rainbow trout, sometimes Baja rainbow trout (Oncorhynchus mykiss nelsoni) and Mexican golden trout (Oncorhynchus chrysogaster)—occur in the Pacific Ocean tributaries of the Baja California peninsula and in the Sierra Madre Occidental of northwestern Mexico as far south as Victoria de Durango in the state of Durango. Many forms of the Mexican rainbow trout (Oncorhynchus mykiss nelsoni and O. m. ssp.), subspecies of the rainbow trout, have been described. The Mexican golden trout (Oncorhynchus chrysogaster) is a recognized species.

== Taxonomy ==
Most of the Mexican native trout are considered subspecies of the rainbow trout (O. mykiss) and generally lumped as O. m. nelsoni Evermann (1908) or O. m. ssp. The exception is the Mexican golden trout (O. chrysogaster Needham and Gard (1964)) which achieved species status in 1964. The first records of trout in northwestern Mexico were published by paleontologist E. D. Cope in 1886 where he describes two specimens from Chihuahua as having the appearance of Salmo purpuratus a name sometimes incorrectly used for cutthroat trout (Oncorhynchus clarki). In 1898 and 1905, naturalist E. W. Nelson with the U.S. Biological Survey led explorations into the Mexican mainland (1898) and Baja California peninsula (1905) to document flora and fauna. In 1908, preserved specimens of trout that Nelson brought back from the Rio Santo Domingo (Santo Domingo creek) in the Sierra de San Pedro Mártir mountains of Baja California were described by ichthyologist B.W. Evermann as a new species Salmo nelsoni, the Baja rainbow trout.

In 1936, Paul Needham, a fisheries biologist with the U.S. Bureau of Fisheries began a series of explorations (1936, 1937 and 1938) into the Rio Santo Domingo drainage in Baja California seeking to bring back live specimens of the Baja rainbow trout as hatchery stock and further study. Although live specimens reached U.S. hatcheries, none ever survived to spawn. In 1952, 1955 and 1956 Needham again explored the Sierra Madre Occidental tributaries of the Gulf of California. Needham's explorations led to the publication of Rainbow Trout of Mexico and California (1959) with coauthor Richard Gard. It contains the first full color drawing of the Mexican golden trout. In 1964, Needham and Gard's proposed binomial name Salmo chrysogaster was accepted as the scientific name for a new species of trout, the Mexican golden trout. The specific name chrysogaster is derived from the Greek for "golden belly". In 1989, morphological and genetic studies indicated trout of the Pacific Basin were genetically closer to Pacific salmon (Oncorhynchus species) than to the Salmos–brown trout (S. trutta) or Atlantic salmon (S. salar) of the Atlantic Basin. Thus, in 1989, taxonomic authorities moved the rainbow, cutthroat and other Pacific Basin trout, including the Mexican native trout, into the genus Oncorhynchus.

In 1997, a group of approximately 40 ichthyologists, biologists and naturalists from several U.S. and Mexican institutions formed a collaborative group, Truchas Mexicanas, to study the diversity of Mexican native trout. Between 1997 and 2005, members of the group explored the rivers and streams of the Sierra Madre Occidental collecting specimens for study and documenting the diverse populations of Mexican native trout. In 2002, fisheries biologist Robert J. Behnke published Trout and Salmon of North America, documenting a lifetime study of North American trout and salmon. In Trout and Salmon of North America, Behnke described two species of trout—the Mexican golden trout (O. chrysogaster) and the Mexican rainbow trout (O. m. nelsoni and O. m. ssp). He described a number of local forms of the Mexican rainbow trout primarily based on the river systems they occurred in.

In 2015, a report delving into the genetics of Mexican golden trout and Mexican rainbow trout from various rivers was published. The authors, in discussing their findings, state:

Here, we again confirm the significant genetic diversity present in trout populations inhabiting northwestern Mexico. Clustering analyses of data from over 100 genetic markers further indicates that there exist at least five major genetic lineages of native trout in Mexico. These clusters originated from at least two, and possibly three, separate colonization events of basins in Northwestern Mexico. The first event gave rise to O. m. nelsoni, the second event to the trout populations of the northern and central SMO. Genetic similarity of the southernmost SMO populations with O. mykiss could be the result of a third, more recent colonization event by steelhead from California or further north, or could be due to introgression by or naturalization of imported hatchery rainbow trout. We also found significant divergence between native trout from the SMO and populations of the widespread O. mykiss, and from the other three described species occupying rivers tributary to the Gulf of California (O. apache, O. gilae, and O. clarkii).

The phylogeny of Mexican native trout is an unsettled science. Some studies suggest that the trout are descendants of the coastal rainbow trout (O. m. irideus) based on the idea that in wetter times, rainbow trout (steelhead) could have easily gained access to Baja California and the Sierra Madre Occidental tributaries from the Pacific ocean. Others have suggested a connection to the inland Columbia River redband trout (O. m. gairdneri). Others have pointed to evidence in some populations that Mexican native trout may have descended from cutthroat trout (O. clarki).

== Range ==
The endemic range of Mexican native trout extends from near the U.S.–Mexican border in western Chihuahua and eastern Sonora south through the Sierra Madre Occidental mountains of Durango. The southernmost recorded occurrence is in the headwaters of the Río Acaponeta in Durango. The first scientific collections of trout from Mexico were by Prof. Nathaniel Thomas Lupton in the early 1880s. During Edward W. Nelson's 1898 expedition, he observed trout in the Rio del Presidio basin near the town of El Salto, but did not collect any specimens. In 1946, Ralph G. Miller an American researching Mexican ichthyofauna near El Salto collected the earliest surviving specimens of the Rio del Presidio trout, which now reside in the Smithsonian Institution. As of 2002, according to ichthyologist Robert J. Behnke, the Rio del Presidio trout were the southernmost natural distribution of any member of the family Salmonidae. This range was extended by collections from the Ríos Baluarte and Acaponeta in 2004.

The many forms of Mexican native trout are typically described by the river systems they occur in.

Name	Range	Comments
Arranged by drainage from north to south
Nelson's trout	Headwater tributaries of the Rio Santo Domingo in the Sierra de San Pedro Mártir mountain range of Baja California	First described in 1908 by Evermann. Also known as the Baja California rainbow trout or the San Pedro Mártir trout.
Rio Yaqui trout	Headwater tributaries of the Rio Yaqui in Sonora	The Yaqui Basin probably has more stream miles of trout than any other watershed in Mexico. Some of the populations are genetically unique and the Rio Yaqui trout is a complex entity, probably containing more than one species. The International Union for Conservation of Nature (IUCN) treats Yaqui and Guzmán trout as a single near threatened entity based on genetic data, the Yaqui trout (Oncorhynchus sp. nov. 'Bavispe trout'), and notes that populations of Yaqui trout in the Bavispe, Papigochi and Tutuaca drainages may have different phenotypes.
Guzmán trout	Headwaters of the Guzmán Basin, an endorheic basin on the eastern slopes of the Sierra Madre Occidental	The Guzmán trout are genetically identical to the trout of the Bavispe Basin in the Rio Yaqui watershed. Mormon colonists transplanted these trout into the Guzmán Basin in the early 1900s.
Rio Tomochi trout	Rio Tomochi	The Rio Tomochi trout are unique genotypically and phenotypically and are sometimes called the southern Rio Yaqui trout.
Rio Mayo trout	Headwater tributaries of the Rio Mayo in Sonora	The Rio Mayo trout are closest phenotypically to the southern Rio Yaqui trout. As Oncorhynchus sp. nov. 'Mayo Trout', the Mayo trout is listed as an endangered species by the IUCN, threatened by mining activity, habitat degradation and overharvest.
Rio Piaxtla trout	Headwater tributaries of the Rio Piaxtla	The Rio Piaxtla trout are closest genetically to the native trout of the Río San Lorenzo. As Oncorhynchus sp. nov. 'Piaxtla Trout', the Piaxtla trout is considered "near threatened" by the IUCN.
Rio Conchos trout	Headwater tributaries of the Rio Conchos (a tributary of the Rio Grande) in Chihuahua	Discovered in 2005, these trout were the first known natural distribution of an Oncorhynchus species in a Mexican Atlantic Basin drainage. Another population of the Rio Conchos trout was discovered in the southern Rio Conchos basin in 2007 by members of Truchas Mexicanas. The northern Conchos trout, Oncorhynchus sp. nov. 'Northern Conchos Trout', is listed as critically endangered by the IUCN. The southern Conchos trout, called Oncorhynchus sp. nov. 'Southern Conchos Trout' by the IUCN, is listed endangered.
Mexican golden trout	Headwaters of the Fuerte, Sinaloa, and Culiacán Rivers in Sinaloa.	O. chrysogaster Needham and Gard (1964) The only Mexican native trout with a formal scientific name. The Mexican golden trout complex is problematic and may consist of several unique genetic populations. For example, the IUCN distinguishes the Sinaloa River population based on meristic and other phenotypic data as a separate species Oncorhynchus sp. nov. 'Sinaloa Golden Trout' (Sinaloa trout), a listed endangered species. It also treats the Río Culiacán population as a species Oncorhynchus sp. nov. 'Culiacán Golden Trout', the Culiacán trout, listed endangered. The Río Fuerte population is regarded by the IUCN as O. chrysogaster and is listed as near threatened.
Rio San Lorenzo trout	Headwater tributaries of the Rio San Lorenzo in Durango	The San Lorenzo trout (Oncorhynchus sp. nov. 'San Lorenzo Trout') is listed by the IUCN as endangered and is threatened by habitat degradation and hybridization with rainbow trout.
Arroyo la Sidra trout	The Río San Lorenzo at Arroyo la Sidra	The Arroyo la Sidra trout below the main waterfall are largely hybridized with hatchery rainbows. The trout above the falls exhibit a peculiar phenotype (compared to other native Rio San Lorenzo trout) and are believed to be largely native.
Rio del Presidio trout	Headwater tributaries of the Rio del Presidio in Chihuahua	As of 2002, it was largely believed that these trout represented the southernmost natural distribution of members of the family Salmonidae in the Americas. The IUCN lists the Presidio trout, Oncorhynchus sp. nov. 'Presidio Trout', as data deficient.
Rio Baluarte trout	The Rio Baluarte. Arroyo Santa Barbara, a barranca southwest of El Salto, Durango	These trout exhibit a unique phenotype and are believed to be native. Their discovery was new to science in 2003. It is a critically endangered species as Oncorhynchus sp. nov. 'Baluarte Trout' according to the IUCN, most immediately threatened by introgression of rainbow trout into its unique gene pool.
Rio Acaponeta trout	The Rio Acaponeta and tributaries. Arroyo las Moras	The mouth of this river is at 22°14' latitude; the trout are from the headwaters much further north. TESS analysis from Escalante et al. show the Rio Acaponeta trout are largely hatchery rainbows. It is unknown if trout are native to this watershed. According to the IUCN, the Acaponeta trout, Oncorhynchus sp. nov. 'Acaponeta Trout', is a critically endangered species threatened by hybridization with rainbow trout, which may increase due to fish hatchery development planned in the region.

== Conservation ==
The Mexican golden trout (O. chrysogaster) was listed as vulnerable by the IUCN Red List of Threatened Species. It is now listed as near threatened. The World Wildlife Fund considers the Rio Conchos trout critically endangered. Truchas Mexicanas reported in 2006 that all the populations of Mexican trout face threats from habitat loss due to logging, mining and aquaculture impacts. The greatest threat to the continued existence of genetically pure Mexican native trout appears to be the widespread rainbow trout aquaculture in the river basins where they reside. Escaped hatchery trout or trout stocked in rivers to support angling can hybridize with native stocks, which can eventually lead to genomic extinction.
