= Carmen River =

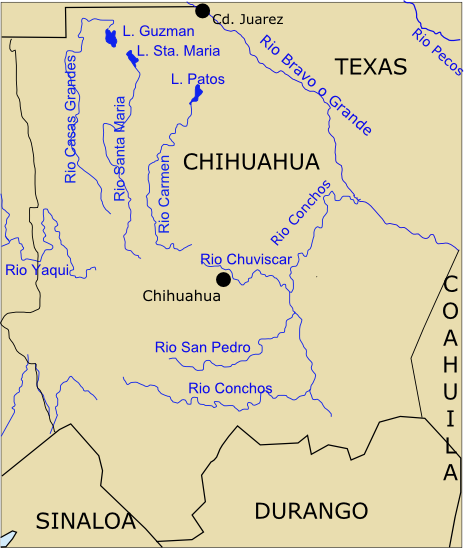
- a map of the Guzmán Basin showing the lake and river between Chihuahua City and Ciudad Juárez
- Native name: Rio del Carmen (Spanish)

Location
- Country: Mexico
- State: Chihuahua

Physical characteristics
- Source
  - coordinates: 30°01′32″N 106°58′44″W
- Mouth
  - location: Laguna de los Patos
  - coordinates: 30°40′37″N 106°29′31″W

The Carmen River (Rio del Carmen) is a river in Chihuahua, Mexico that rises to the west of Lake St Martin and drains into Lake Patos (Laguna de los Patos).

Like other rivers in north-west Chihuahua, the river disappears at the lake because of the rainfall levels and the arid climate. It can very between being an intermittent stream in the dry season to a full-flowing river in the rainy season (Note: On some maps it is marked as an arroyo.). The lake can be almost entirely dried out in some years.

The river flows past Villa Ahumada to the east.

In prehistoric times, this river alongside the Rio Casas Grandes and Rio Santa Maria to the west formed a river system with a significant population. Several archaeological finds along the river valley and in Lake Patas are indicative of worked turquoise at the time of the Casas Grandes.

Laguna de los Patos itself (Note: approximate north-south midpoint 30°43′22″N 106°29′24″W) is 11 kilometres (6.8 miles) north of Villa Ahumada, at an elevation of 1,150 metres (1,260 yd) above mean sea level; and the Pan-American Highway runs to its west. It is so-named because of its historic reputation as a place where wildfowl (Note: patos meaning ducks) gathered. However, both the river and the lake have been used by farmers for irrigation leaving the lake entirely dry during some parts of the year since the 1940s, and greatly diminished in size in general over the course of the middle 20th century. Wildfowl have been observed still gathering there in small numbers during that period, in the wet season and on the ice of the lake in the winter.

The lake's long axis runs north-south (Note: northnmost tip approximately 30°46′21″N 106°29′23″W), with it being roughly 8 by 3 kilometres (5.0 by 1.9 miles) (Note: 7.2 by 2.4 kilometres (4.5 by 1.5 miles) according to one 1963 aeronautical chart) in size. In 1956 its area was measured at 2,400 hectares (5,900 acres), and in 1981 it was estimated to have a roughly maximal area of 5,500 hectares (14,000 acres) after heavy rainfall.

It is considered likely that the regular high wind levels and muddy nature of the lakebed, as well as heavy grazing, inhibit the growth of aquatic vegetation on the lake.

== See also ==
- List of rivers of Mexico
- Endorheic basin
