= Iwame trout =

Variety of fish

The iwame trout (Japanese: 岩女魚, イワメ, 'rock lady fish') or markless trout is a variety of salmonid fish inhabiting some freshwater systems of Japan. It is an intra-specific mutant morph of the masu salmon (Oncorhynchus masou) that is characterized by a lack of the lateral camouflage spots (parr marks) typical of juvenile salmon in most populations. The iwame is a stream-resident morph that does not migrate to the sea as adults. This morph is recessively inherited and occurs together with the standard phenotype in some populations.

This morph occurs in the landlocked amago subspecies (Oncorhynchus masou ishikawae) in western Japan, and apparently also in the nominate subspecies yamame (Oncorhynchus masou masou), if these are not identical.

The morph was scientifically described as a distinct species Oncorhynchus iwame in 1961 by Kimura & Nakamura. In the 2000s, the iwame morph was shown to occur as a polymorphism in random mating populations of O. masou, and is no more thought to have taxonomical value.
