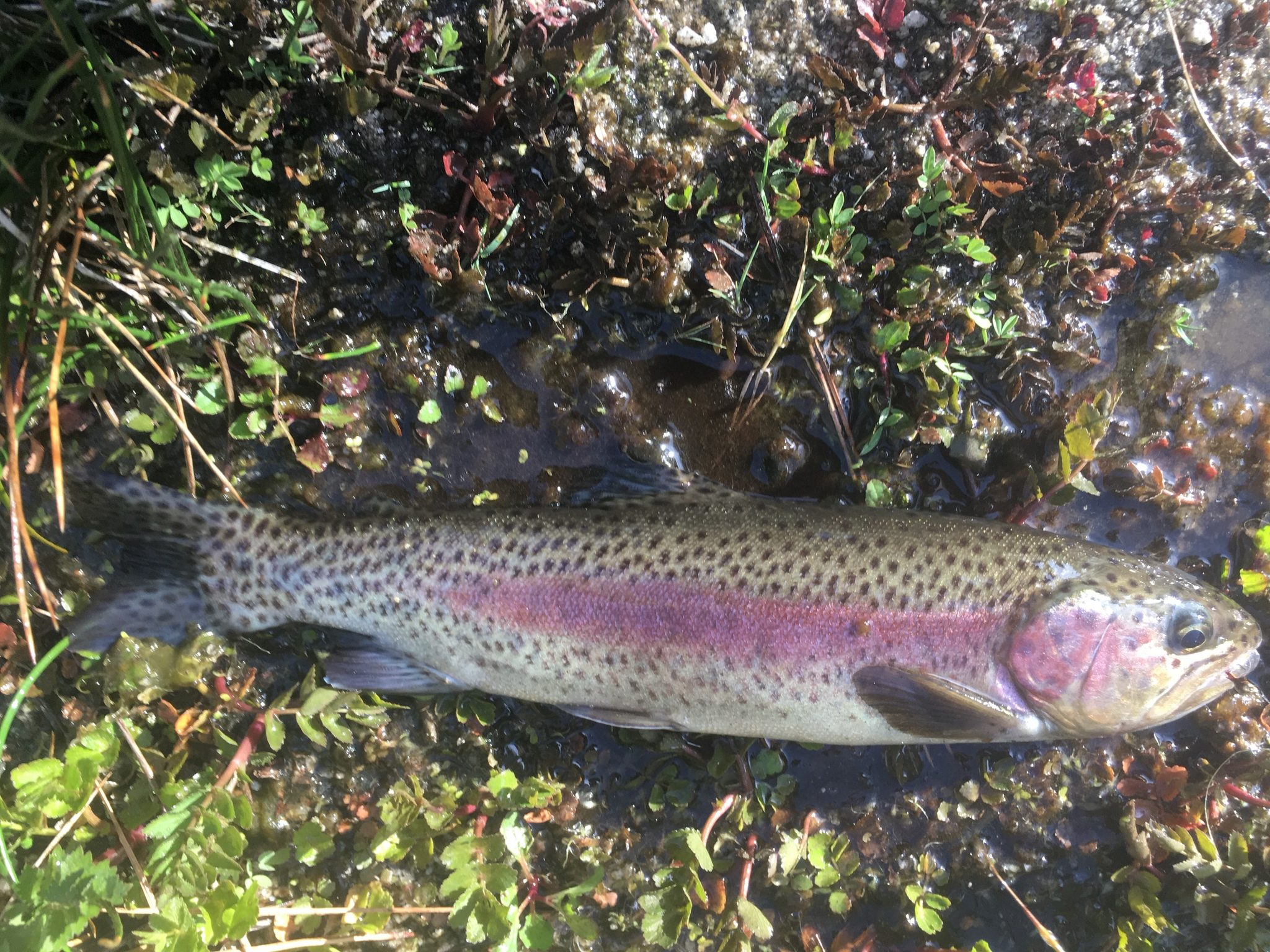

Scientific classification
- Kingdom: Animalia
- Phylum: Chordata
- Class: Actinopterygii
- Division: Teleostei
- Order: Salmoniformes
- Family: Salmonidae
- Genus: Oncorhynchus
- Species: O. mykiss
- Subspecies: O. m. nelsoni

Trinomial name
- Oncorhynchus mykiss nelsoni Evermann, 1908

= Baja California rainbow trout =

Subspecies of fish

The Baja California rainbow trout or San Pedro Martir trout or Nelson's trout (Oncorhynchus mykiss nelsoni) is a localized subspecies of the rainbow trout (Oncorhynchus mykiss), a freshwater fish in the family Salmonidae. It is considered a Mexican native trout.

== Distribution ==
It is endemic to headwater tributaries of the Rio Santo Domingo in the Sierra de San Pedro Mártir mountain range of the Peninsular Ranges System, located in Baja California state on the northern Baja California Peninsula.

== Taxonomy ==
=== 19th century ===
The first records of trout in northwestern Mexico were published by paleontologist E. D. Cope in 1886 where he describes two specimens from Chihuahua as having the appearance of Salmo purpuratus a name sometimes incorrectly used for cutthroat trout (Oncorhynchus clarki). In 1898 and 1905, naturalist E. W. Nelson with the U.S. Biological Survey led explorations into the Mexican mainland (1898) and Baja California Peninsula (1905) to document flora and fauna.

=== 20th century ===
In 1908, preserved specimens of trout that Nelson brought back from the Rio Santo Domingo (Santo Domingo creek) in the Sierra de San Pedro Mártir mountains of Baja California were described by ichthyologist B.W. Evermann as a new species Salmo nelsoni, the Baja rainbow trout.

In 1989, morphological and genetic studies indicated trout of the Pacific basin were genetically closer to Pacific salmon (Oncorhynchus species) than to the Salmos–brown trout (S. trutta) or Atlantic salmon (S. salar) of the Atlantic basin. Thus, in 1989, taxonomic authorities moved the rainbow, cutthroat and other Pacific basin trout, including the Mexican native trout into the genus Oncorhynchus. Thus Salmo mykiss nelsoni became O. m. nelsoni.

=== 21st century ===
Eschmeyer's Catalog of Fishes recognised Baja California rainbow trout as a species, Oncorhynchus nelsoni Evermann 1908.

== See also ==
- Endemic fauna of Mexico
- Fauna of the Baja California Peninsula
- Freshwater fish of North America
