= Mexican golden trout =

Conservation status
- Near Threatened (IUCN 3.1)

Scientific classification
- Kingdom: Animalia
- Phylum: Chordata
- Class: Actinopterygii
- Division: Teleostei
- Order: Salmoniformes
- Family: Salmonidae
- Genus: Oncorhynchus
- Species: O. chrysogaster

Binomial name
- Oncorhynchus chrysogaster (Needham & Gard, 1964)

Synonyms
- Salmo chrysogaster Needham & Gard, 1964

Species of fish

The Mexican golden trout (Oncorhynchus chrysogaster) is a species of fish in the family Salmonidae. The species is endemic to high-elevation headwaters of the Fuerte River, Sinaloa River, and Culiacán River drainages in the Sierra Madre Occidental in Mexico.

== Taxonomy ==
In 1936, Paul Needham, a fisheries biologist with the U.S. Bureau of Fisheries began a series of explorations (1936, 1937 and 1938) into the Rio Santo Domingo drainage in Baja California seeking to bring back live specimens of the Baja rainbow trout as hatchery stock and further study. Although live specimens reached U.S. hatcheries, none ever survived to spawn. In 1952, 1955 and 1956 Needham again explored the Sierra Madre Occidental tributaries of the Gulf of California. Needham's explorations led to the publication of Rainbow Trout of Mexico and California (1959) with coauthor Richard Gard. It contains the first full color drawing of the Mexican golden trout. In 1964, Needham and Gard's proposed binomial name Salmo chrysogaster was accepted as the scientific name for a new species of trout, the Mexican golden trout. The specific name chrysogaster comes from Ancient Greek χρυσός (khrusós), meaning "gold", and γαστήρ (gastḗr), meaning "belly". In 1989, morphological and genetic studies indicated trout of the Pacific basin were genetically closer to Pacific salmon (Oncorhynchus species) than to the Salmos—brown trout (S. trutta) or Atlantic salmon (S. salar)—of the Atlantic basin. Thus, in 1989, taxonomic authorities moved the rainbow, cutthroat and other Pacific basin trout, including the Mexican golden trout, into the genus Oncorhynchus.

== Etymology ==
The genus name Oncorhynchus comes from Ancient Greek ὄγκος (ónkos), meaning "bend", and ῥύγχος (rhúnkhos), meaning "snout". The specific name chrysogaster comes from Ancient Greek χρυσός (khrusós), meaning "gold", and γαστήρ gastḗr), meaning "belly".

== Description ==
The Mexican golden trout is sexually dimorphic; males can easily be identified from females due to their much longer jaws or kype. Mexican golden trout are brightly colored with blue parr marks on both males and females along the side of the body. Purple scaling is visible along the lateral line. Both sexes also have bright golden-yellow belly coloration. The top of the fish and the tailfin are covered in small black spots with much larger spotting on the dorsal fin. The pectoral fins, pelvic fin and anal fin are light orange in color with white tips. Due to their harsh and small stream habitat the Mexican golden trout remains small even when fully grown. Adults rarely reach over a foot long with the maximum size probably being 10 inches (25 cm). Overall body shape and fin placement are nearly identical to those of rainbow trout. Juvenile banding ("parr marks") usually remains distinct throughout the fish's life.

== Distribution ==
Mexican golden trout have an extremely limited range, being found only in the pristine high-elevation headwaters of the Fuerte River, Sinaloa River, and Culiacán River drainages in the Sierra Madre Occidental. This fish is highly restricted, and only known from 15 localities: one in the Sinaloa, four in the Culiacan, and ten in the Fuerte.

== Habitat ==
Mexican golden trout are limited to small streams created by small cienegas (spring-fed marshes) above 5,000 feet (1,500 m). The surrounding landscape is dominated by deep canyons, scrub forest, evergreens and hardwoods.

== Status and threats ==
The primary threats to the Mexican golden trout include habitat degradation from livestock overgrazing and logging, hybridization with introduced rainbow trout, and localized fishing pressure. The biggest threats are human development and the possibility of competition/interbreeding with introduced rainbow trout (Oncorhynchus mykiss). This trout is also an example of the negative effects of habitat abuse and destruction. The primary use for the Mexican golden trout is as food by the local indigenous people. Some of the local people use dynamite to stun the fish and collect them as they float to the top of the water. This is especially harmful to the golden trout populations because of the mass harvest. Sanitation practices in the region where the golden trout is found is minimal, so much of its home water is polluted with residential sewage and trash. What is happening now in Mexican golden trout water is similar to what happened to so many other North American trout waters in the 19th and early 20th centuries, as far as decline in populations is concerned.

== See also ==
- Mexican native trout
