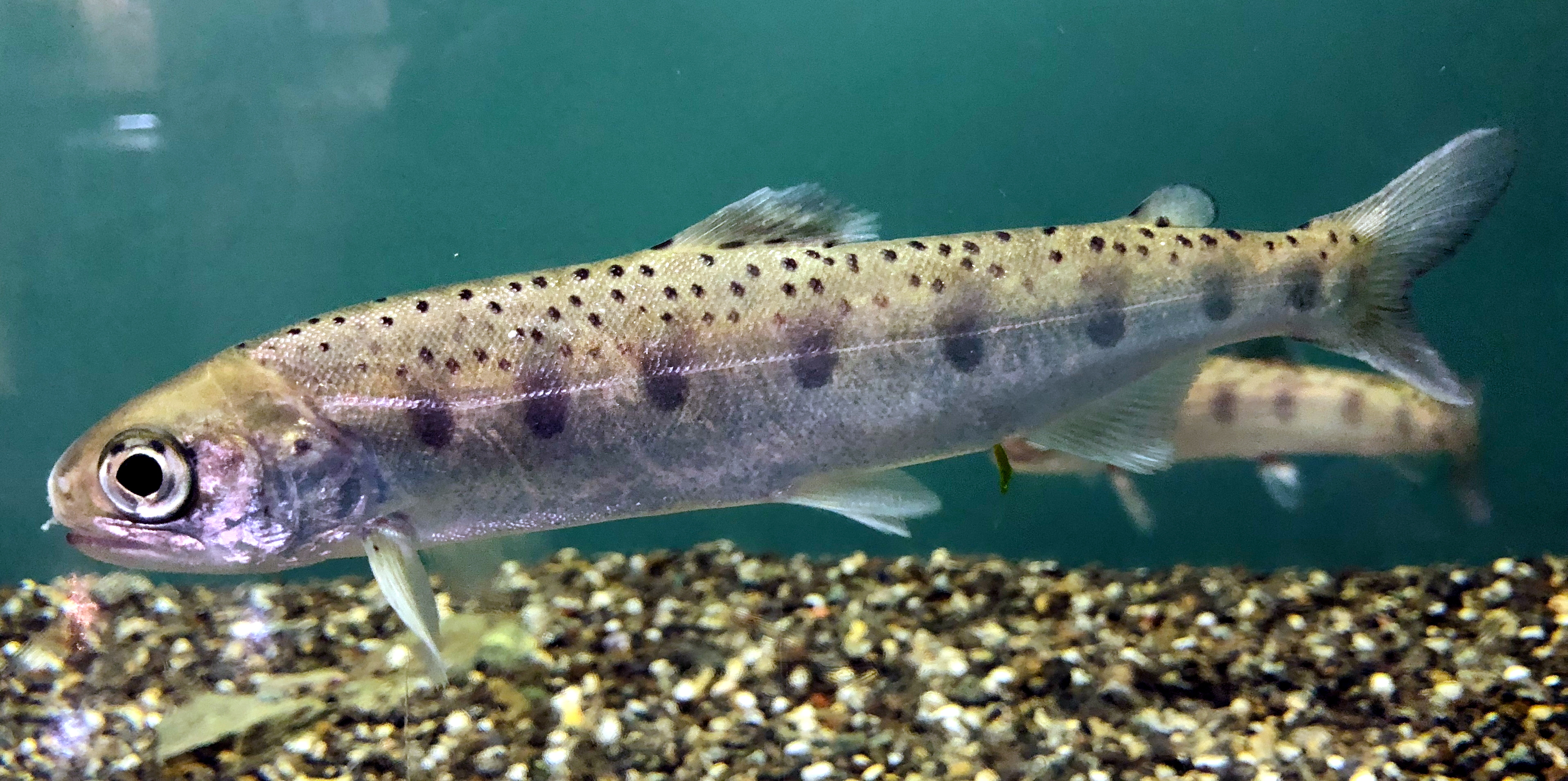

Scientific classification
- Kingdom: Animalia
- Phylum: Chordata
- Class: Actinopterygii
- Division: Teleostei
- Order: Salmoniformes
- Family: Salmonidae
- Genus: Oncorhynchus
- Species: O. biwaensis

Binomial name
- Oncorhynchus biwaensis Fujioka et al. 2025

= Biwa trout =

Species of fish

The Biwa trout, or Biwa salmon (Oncorhynchus biwaensis) is an anadromous salmonid fish of the genus Oncorhynchus, endemic to Lake Biwa in Shiga Prefecture, Japan, but also introduced to Lake Ashi and Lake Chūzenji.

This species was previously identified to be same animal as Oncorhynchus (masuou) rhodurus which is first described from Lake Ashi. However, The Biwa trout was found to be a separate species from O. rhodurus and was described as a new species in 2025. O. rhodurus may represent a hybrid specimen instead.

Biwa trout is found only in the waters of northern Lake Biwa, and feeds on plankton, freshwater prawns, aquatic insects, worms, ayu and other small fishes, and sometimes small mammals. Adult Biwa trout usually range from 40 to 50 cm (16 to 20 in) in length and 1.5 to 2.5 kg (3.3 to 5.5 lb) in weight, although large specimens can be up to 70 cm (28 in) long and 5.0 kg (11.0 lb) in weight.

== Use as food ==
Biwa trout represents a unique food fish for the Shiga Prefecture. Biwa trout and its caviar are considered a delicacy. Usual ways to prepare the trout is as sashimi, by grilling with salt, in meuniere, or by smoking, deep-frying or simmering, etc. The fish has a reputation as being very difficult to catch by angling.

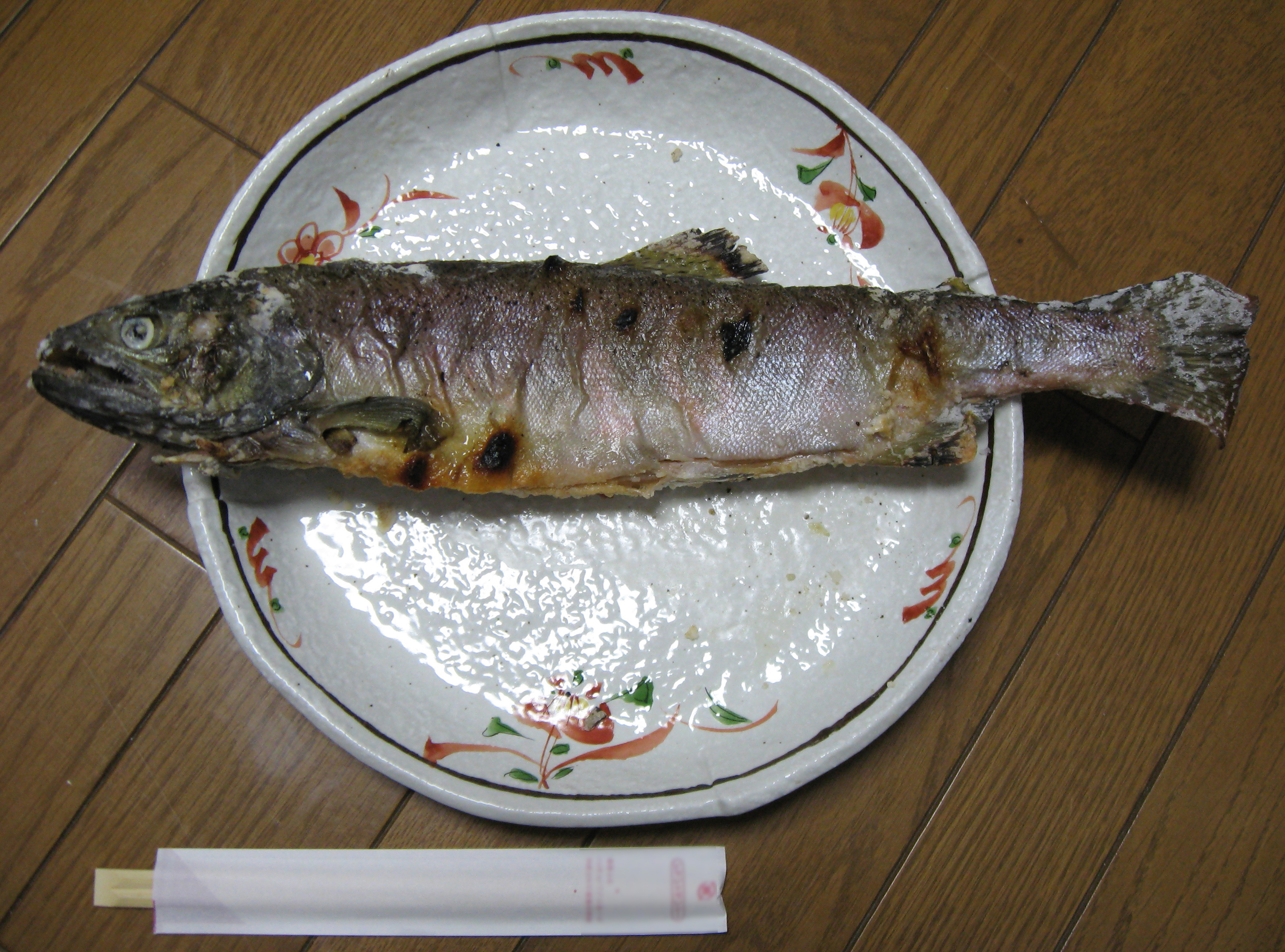
Grilled

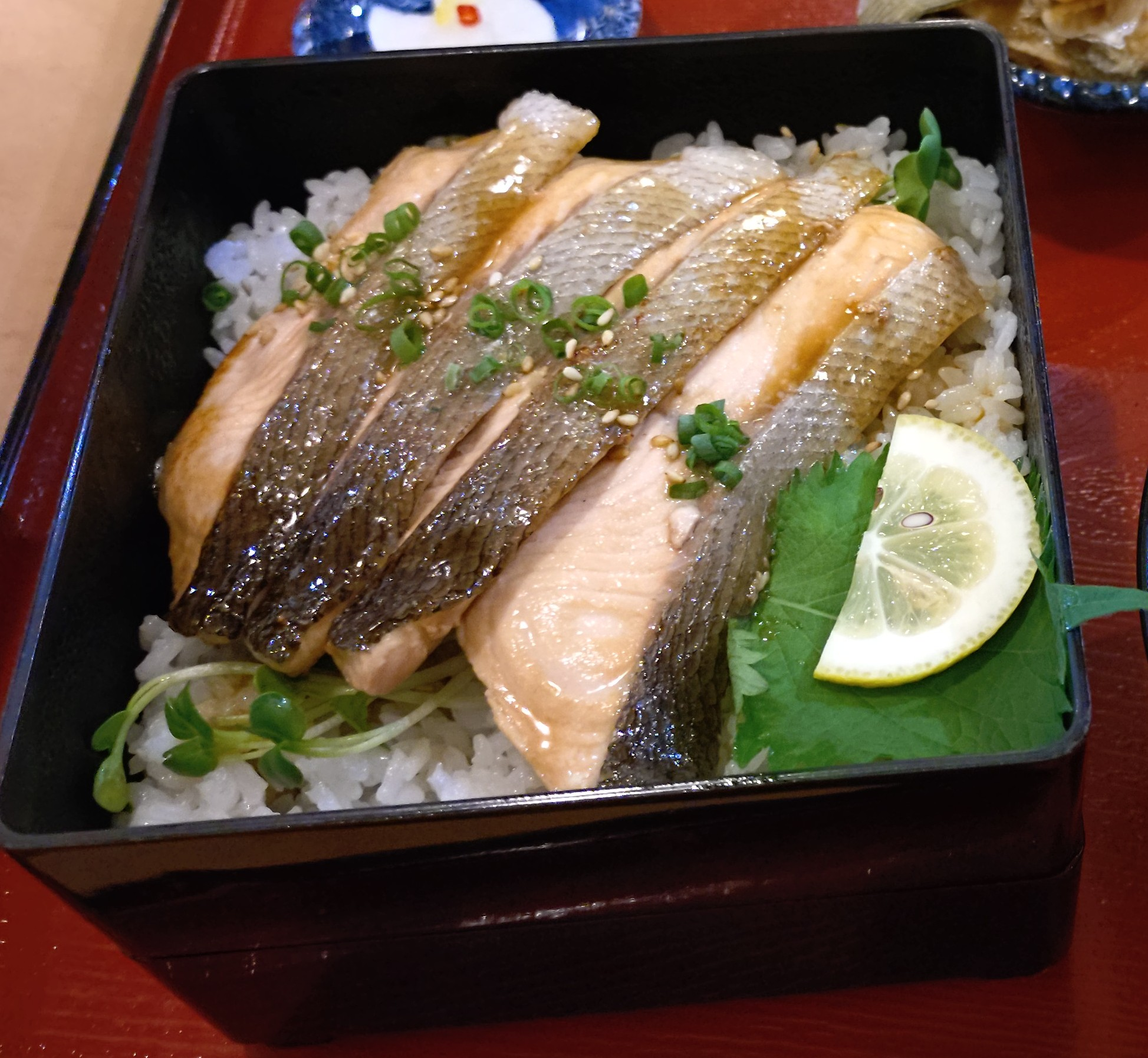
Grilled with rice

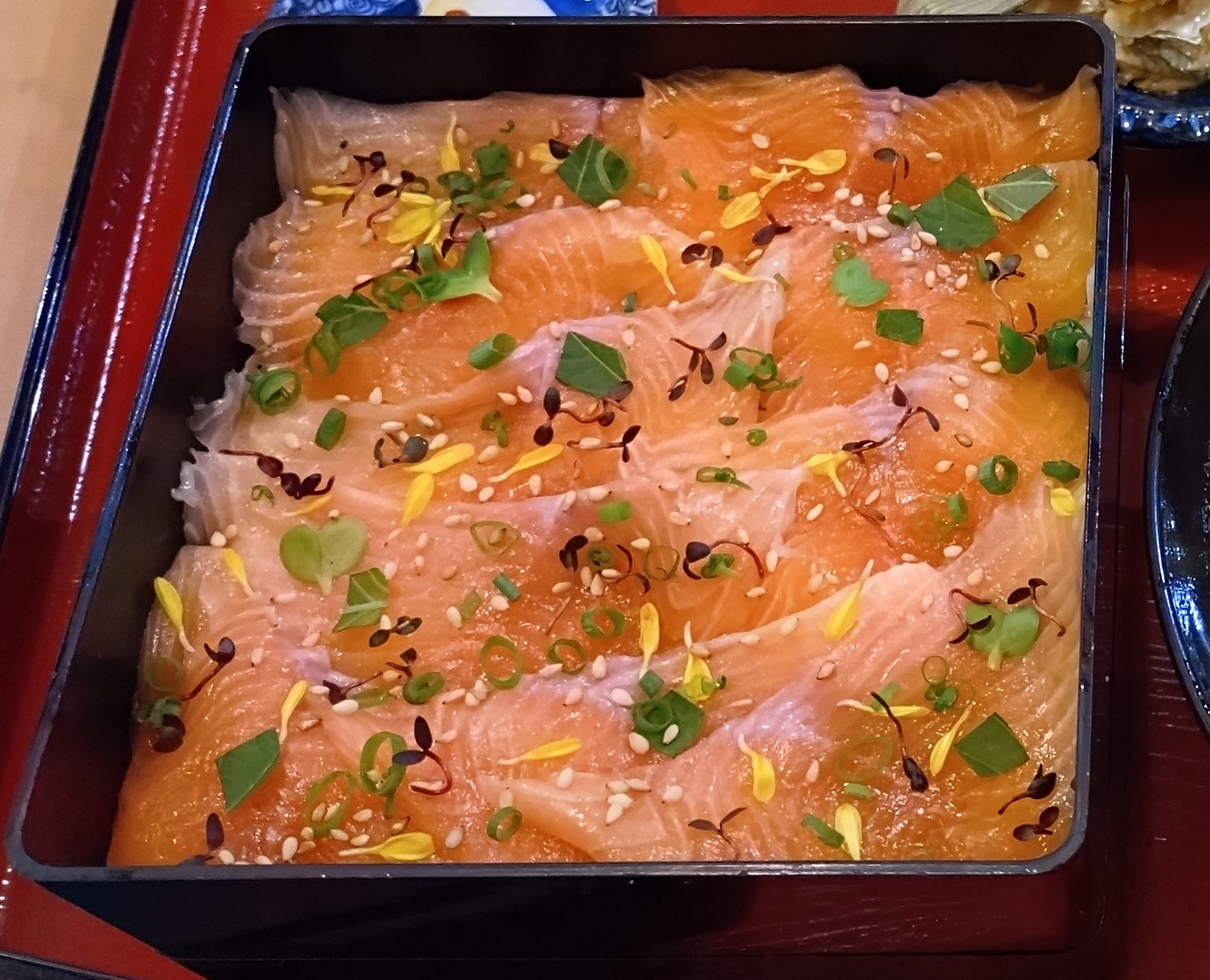
Raw chirashizushi with rice

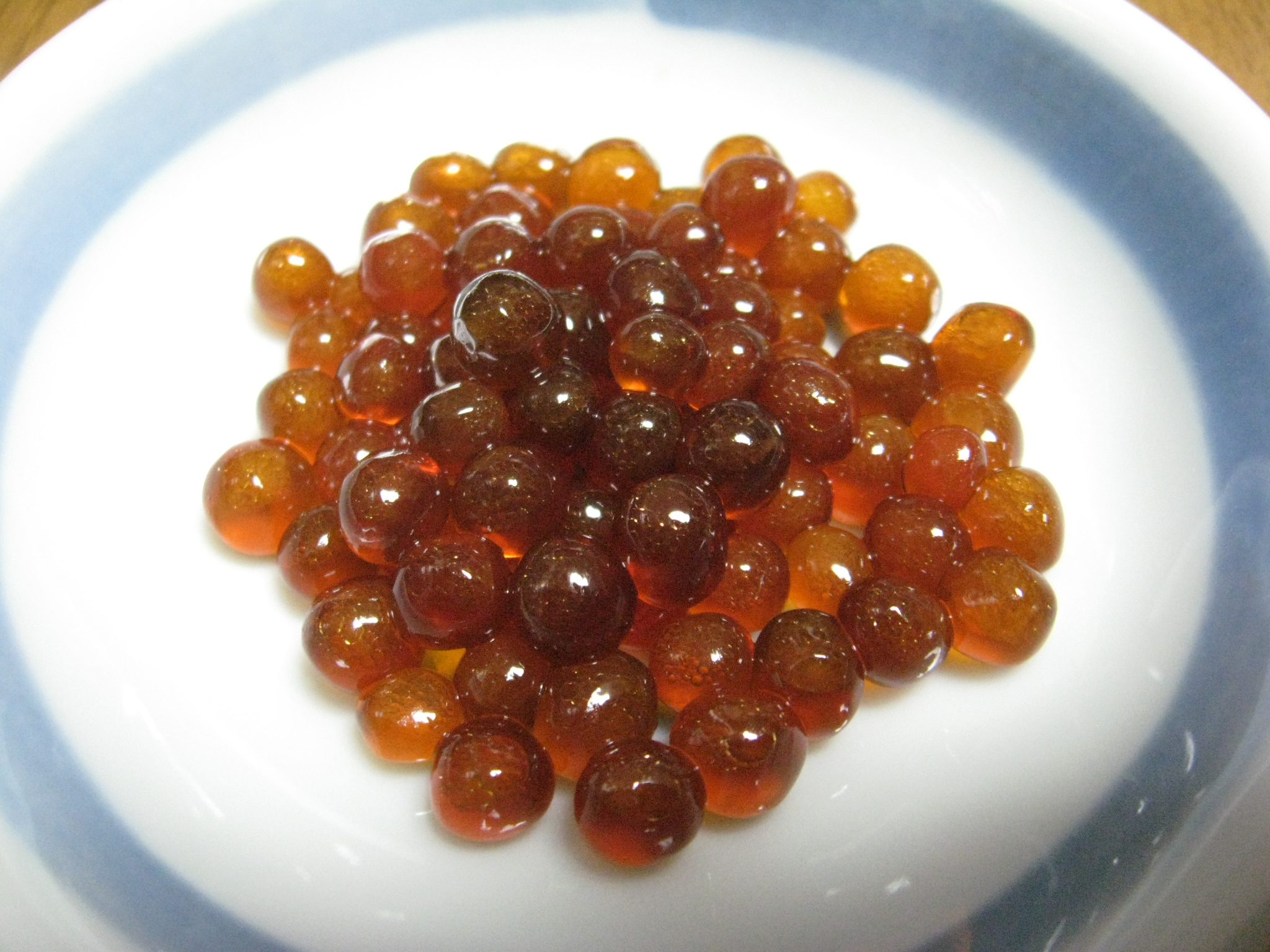
Roe pickled in soy sauce
