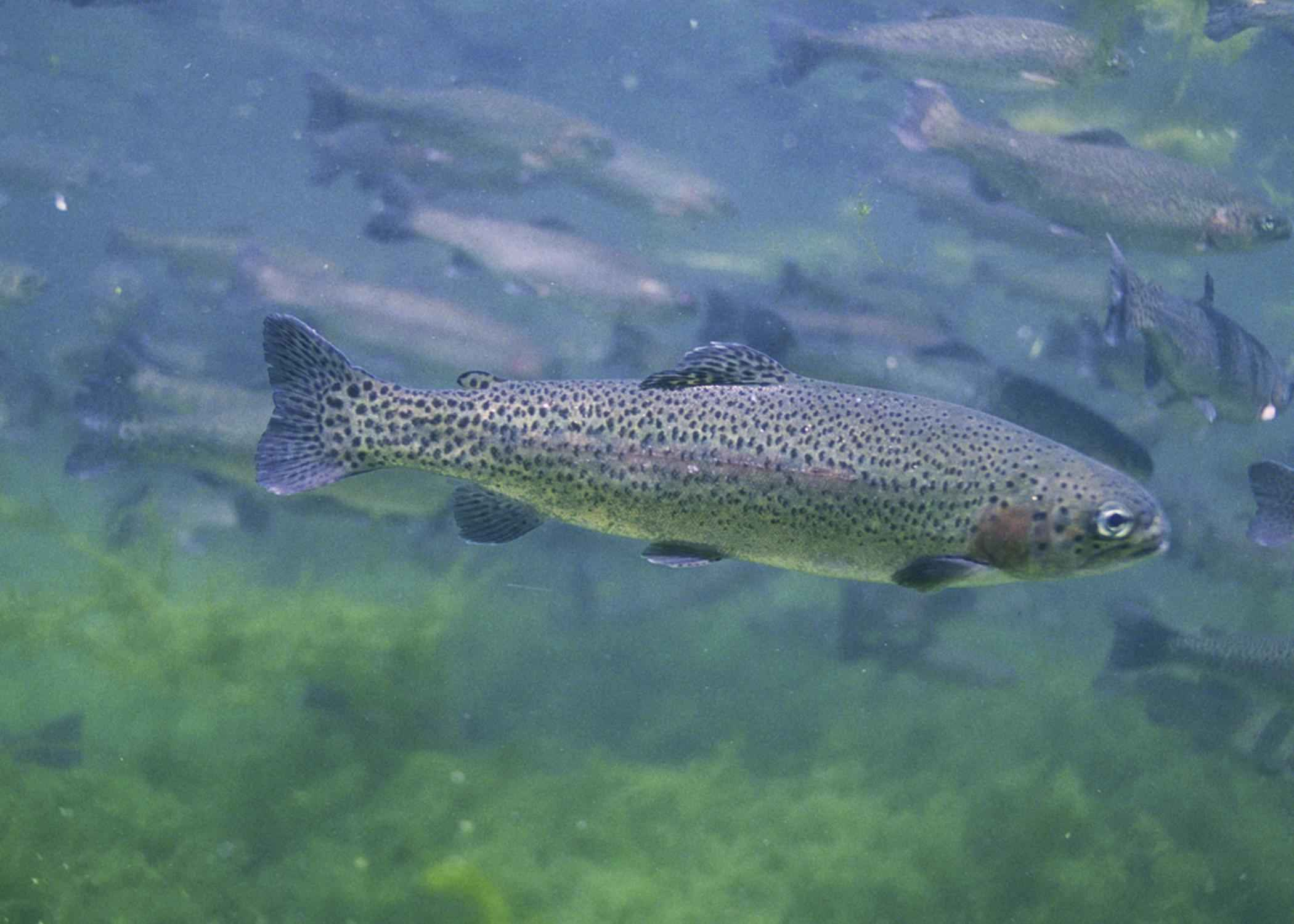
- Adult rainbow trout

Conservation status
- Least Concern (IUCN 3.1)

- Secure (NatureServe)

Scientific classification
- Kingdom: Animalia
- Phylum: Chordata
- Class: Actinopterygii
- Division: Teleostei
- Order: Salmoniformes
- Family: Salmonidae
- Genus: Oncorhynchus
- Species: O. mykiss

Binomial name
- Oncorhynchus mykiss (Walbaum, 1792)

Synonyms
- previous scientific names: Salmo mykiss Walbaum, 1792 Parasalmo mykiss (Walbaum, 1792) Salmo purpuratus Pallas, 1814 Salmo penshinensis Pallas, 1814 Parasalmo penshinensis (Pallas, 1814) Salmo gairdnerii Richardson, 1836 Fario gairdneri (Richardson, 1836) Oncorhynchus gairdnerii (Richardson, 1836) Salmo gairdnerii gairdnerii Richardson, 1836 Salmo rivularis Ayres, 1855 Salmo iridea Gibbons, 1855 Salmo gairdnerii irideus Gibbons, 1855 Salmo irideus Gibbons, 1855 Trutta iridea (Gibbons, 1855) Salmo truncatus Suckley, 1859 Salmo masoni Suckley, 1860 Oncorhynchus kamloops Jordan, 1892 Salmo kamloops (Jordan, 1892) Salmo rivularis kamloops (Jordan, 1892) Salmo gairdneri shasta Jordan, 1894 Salmo gilberti Jordan, 1894 Salmo nelsoni Evermann, 1908

= Rainbow trout =

Fresh-water species of fish

The rainbow trout (Oncorhynchus mykiss) is a species of trout native to cold-water tributaries of the Pacific Ocean in North America and Asia. The steelhead (sometimes called steelhead trout) is an anadromous (sea-run) form of the coastal rainbow trout (O. m. irideus) or Columbia River redband trout (O. m. gairdneri) that usually returns to freshwater to spawn after living two to three years in the ocean.

Adult freshwater stream rainbow trout average between 0.5 and 2.5 kilograms (1 and 5 lb), while lake-dwelling and anadromous forms may reach 9 kg (20 lb). Coloration varies widely based on subspecies, forms, and habitat. Adult fish are distinguished by a broad reddish stripe along the lateral line, from gills to the tail, which is most vivid in breeding males.

Wild-caught and hatchery-reared forms of the species have been transplanted and introduced for food or sport in at least 45 countries and every continent except Antarctica. Introductions to locations outside their native range in the United States, Southern Europe, Australia, New Zealand, and South America have damaged native fish species. Introduced populations may affect native species by preying on them, out-competing them, transmitting contagious diseases (such as whirling disease), or hybridizing with closely related species and subspecies. The rainbow trout is included in the list of the top 100 globally invasive species. Other introductions into waters previously devoid of fish or with severely depleted stocks of native fish have created sport fisheries, such as the Great Lakes and Wyoming's Firehole River.

Some local populations of specific subspecies, or in the case of steelhead, distinct population segments, are listed as either threatened or endangered under the Endangered Species Act. The steelhead is the official state fish of Washington.

== Taxonomy ==
The scientific name of the rainbow trout is Oncorhynchus mykiss. The species was originally named by German naturalist and taxonomist Johann Julius Walbaum in 1792 based on type specimens from the Kamchatka Peninsula in Siberia. Walbaum's original species name, mykiss, was derived from the local Kamchatkan name used for the fish, mykizha. The name of the genus is from the Greek ὄγκος (ónkos) "lump, bend, hook" and ῥύγχος (rhúnkhos) "snout", in reference to the hooked jaws of males in the mating season (the "kype").

Sir John Richardson, a Scottish naturalist, named a specimen of this species Salmo gairdneri in 1836 to honor Meredith Gairdner, a Hudson's Bay Company surgeon at Fort Vancouver on the Columbia River who provided Richardson with specimens. In 1855, William P. Gibbons, the curator of Geology and Mineralogy at the California Academy of Sciences, found a population and named it Salmo iridia (Latin: rainbow), later corrected to Salmo irideus. These names faded once it was determined that Walbaum's description of type specimens was conspecific and therefore had precedence. In 1989, morphological and genetic studies indicated that trout of the Pacific Basin were genetically closer to Pacific salmon (Oncorhynchus species) than to the genus Salmo (brown trout (Salmo trutta), Atlantic salmon (Salmo salar) and relatives) of the Atlantic Basin. Thus, in 1989, taxonomic authorities moved the rainbow, cutthroat, and other Pacific Basin trout into the genus Oncorhynchus. Walbaum's name had precedence, so the species name Oncorhynchus mykiss became the scientific name of the rainbow trout. The previous species names irideus and gairdneri were adopted as subspecies names for the coastal rainbow and Columbia River redband trout, respectively. Anadromous forms of the coastal rainbow trout (O. m. irideus) or Columbia River redband trout (O. m. gairdneri) are commonly known as steelhead.

=== Subspecies ===
Subspecies of Oncorhynchus mykiss are listed below as described by fisheries biologist Robert J. Behnke (2002).

Geographical group	Common name	Scientific name	Range	Image
Type subspecies	Kamchatkan rainbow trout	O. m. mykiss (Walbaum, 1792)	Western Pacific: the Kamchatka Peninsula, and has been recorded from the Commander Islands east of Kamchatka, and sporadically in the Sea of Okhotsk, as far south as the mouth of the Amur River	
Coastal forms (irideus group)	Coastal rainbow trout	O. m. irideus (Gibbons, 1855)	Pacific Ocean tributaries from Aleutian Islands in Alaska south to Southern California. Anadromous forms are known as steelhead, freshwater forms as rainbow trout.	Ocean (a.k.a. "steelhead") and fresh water forms of coastal rainbow trout O. m. irideus
Coastal forms (irideus group)	Beardslee trout	O. m. irideus var. beardsleei (a genetically unique lake-dwelling variety of the coastal rainbow trout) (Jordan, 1896)	Isolated in Lake Crescent, Washington	Ocean (a.k.a. "steelhead") and fresh water forms of coastal rainbow trout O. m. irideus
Redband forms (gairdneri group)	Columbia River redband trout	O. m. gairdneri (Richardson, 1836)	Found in the Columbia River and its tributaries in Montana, Washington and Idaho. Anadromous forms are known as redband steelhead.	Columbia River redband trout O. m. gairdneri
Redband forms (gairdneri group)	Athabasca rainbow trout	O. m. spp., considered by Behnke as a form of O. m. gairdneri, but considered a separate subspecies by biologist L. M. Carl of the Ontario Ministry of Resources, Aquatic Ecosystems Research Section and associates from work published in 1994.	Distributed throughout the headwaters of the Athabasca River system in Alberta	Columbia River redband trout O. m. gairdneri
Redband forms (gairdneri group)	McCloud River redband trout	O. m. stonei (Jordan, 1894)	Native to the McCloud River, upstream of Middle Falls, and its tributaries in Northern California, south of Mount Shasta.	Columbia River redband trout O. m. gairdneri
Redband forms (gairdneri group)	Sheepheaven Creek redband trout	O. m. spp.	Native to Sheepheaven Creek, Siskiyou County, California. Sheepheaven Creek redband were transplanted into Swamp Creek in 1972 and 1974 and into Trout Creek in 1977.	Columbia River redband trout O. m. gairdneri
Redband forms (gairdneri group)	Great Basin redband trout	O. m. newberrii (Girard, 1859)	Native in southeastern Oregon and parts of California and Nevada on the periphery of the Great Basin.	Columbia River redband trout O. m. gairdneri
Redband forms (gairdneri group)	Eagle Lake trout	O. m. aquilarum (Snyder, 1917)	Endemic to Eagle Lake in Lassen County, California.	Columbia River redband trout O. m. gairdneri
Redband forms (gairdneri group)	Kamloops rainbow trout	O. m. kamloops strain (Jordan, 1892)	Native to several large British Columbia lakes, particularly Kamloops Lake and Kootenay Lake. Known for its very large size.	Columbia River redband trout O. m. gairdneri
Kern River forms (golden trout, aguabonita group)	Golden trout	O. m. aguabonita (Jordan, 1892)	Native to Golden Trout Creek (tributary to the Kern River), Volcano Creek (tributary to Golden Trout Creek), and the South Fork Kern River.	Kern River golden trout O. m. aguabonita
Kern River forms (golden trout, aguabonita group)	Kern River rainbow trout	O. m. gilberti (Jordan, 1894)	Endemic to the Kern River and tributaries in Tulare County, California. Its current range is drastically reduced from its historic range. Remnant populations live in the Kern River above Durrwood Creek, in upper Ninemile, Rattlesnake, and Osa creeks, and possibly in upper Peppermint Creek.	Kern River golden trout O. m. aguabonita
Kern River forms (golden trout, aguabonita group)	Little Kern golden trout	O. m. whitei (Evermann, 1906)	Endemic to about 160 kilometres (100 mi) of the Little Kern River and tributaries of Tulare County, California. Their current range is restricted to five headwater streams in the Kern River basin (Wet Meadows, Deadman, Soda Spring, Willow, Sheep, and Fish creeks) plus an introduced population in Coyote Creek, a tributary of the Kern River.	Kern River golden trout O. m. aguabonita
Mexican forms (nelsoni group)	Mexican rainbow trout *Rio Yaqui, Rio Mayo and Guzman trout *Rio San Lorenzo and Arroyo la Sidra trout *Rio del Presidio trout	O. m. nelsoni (Evermann, 1908)	Sometimes referred to as Nelson's trout, occurs in three distinct geographic groups. The taxonomy of these trout is subject to ongoing research, and there may be significant diversity of forms in this group.	
Mutated forms	Golden rainbow trout or Palomino trout or lightning trout	So-called golden rainbow trout or palomino trout are bred from a single mutated color variant of O. mykiss that originated in a West Virginia fish hatchery in 1955. They are also known as banana trout. It is stocked outside of West Virginia but West Virginia still stocks 50,000 palominos a year. The golden rainbow trout is predominantly yellowish, lacking the typical green field and black spots, but retaining the diffuse red stripe. The palomino trout is a mixture of golden and common rainbow trout, resulting in an intermediate color. The golden rainbow trout is not the same subspecies as the naturally occurring O. m. aguabonita, the Kern River golden trout of California.		Golden rainbow trout

== Description ==
Resident freshwater rainbow trout adults average between 0.5 and 2.5 kg (1 and 5 lb) in riverine environments, while lake-dwelling, and anadromous forms may reach 9 kg (20 lb). Coloration varies widely between regions and subspecies. Adult freshwater forms are generally blue-green or olive green with heavy black spotting over the length of the body. Adult fish have a broad reddish stripe along the lateral line, from gills to the tail, which is most pronounced in breeding males. The caudal fin is squarish and only mildly forked. Lake-dwelling and anadromous forms are usually more silvery in color with the reddish stripe almost completely gone. Juvenile rainbow trout display parr marks (dark vertical bars) typical of most salmonid juveniles. In some redband and golden trout forms, parr marks are typically retained into adulthood. Some coastal rainbow trout (O. m. irideus) and Columbia River redband trout (O. m. gairdneri) populations and cutbow hybrids may also display reddish or pink throat markings similar to cutthroat trout. In many regions, hatchery-bred trout can be distinguished from native trout via fin clips. Fin clipping the adipose fin is a management tool used to identify hatchery-reared fish.

== Life cycle ==
Rainbow trout, including steelhead forms, generally spawn in early to late spring (January to June in the Northern Hemisphere and September to November in the Southern Hemisphere) when water temperatures reach at least 6 to 7 °C (42 to 44 °F). The maximum recorded lifespan for a rainbow trout is 11 years.

=== Freshwater life cycle ===
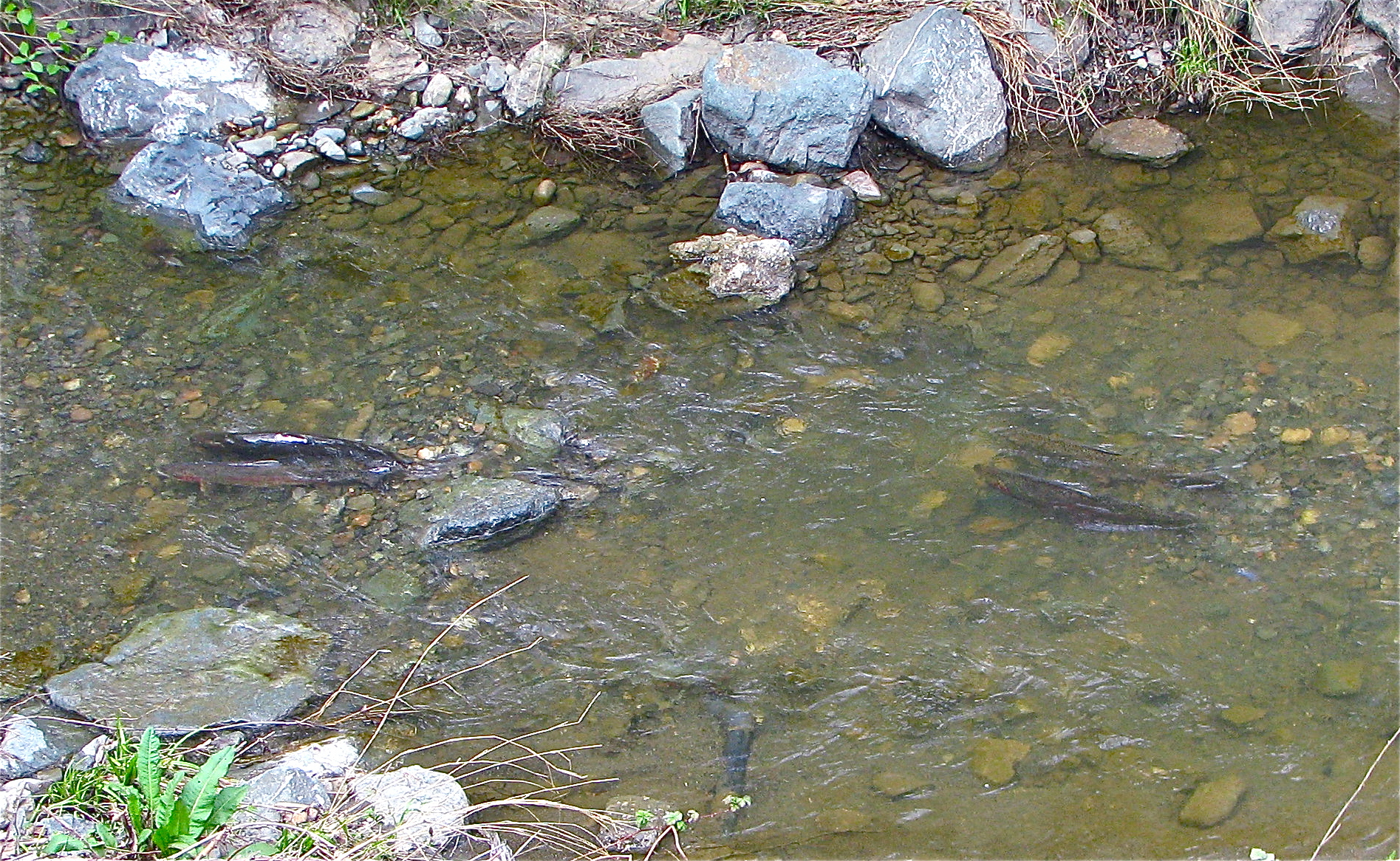
Two pairs of steelhead spawning in the lower reaches of Stevens Creek in Mountain View, California

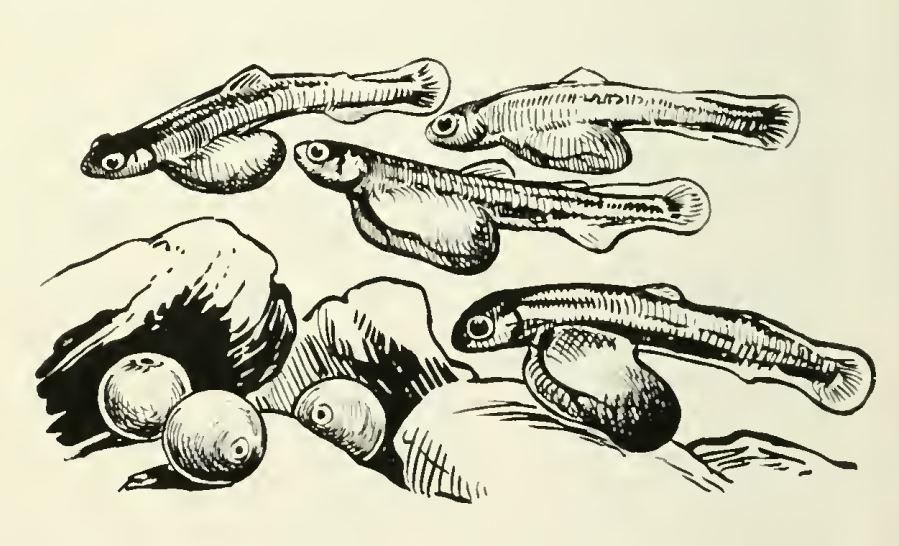
Eggs in gravel and rainbow trout alevin

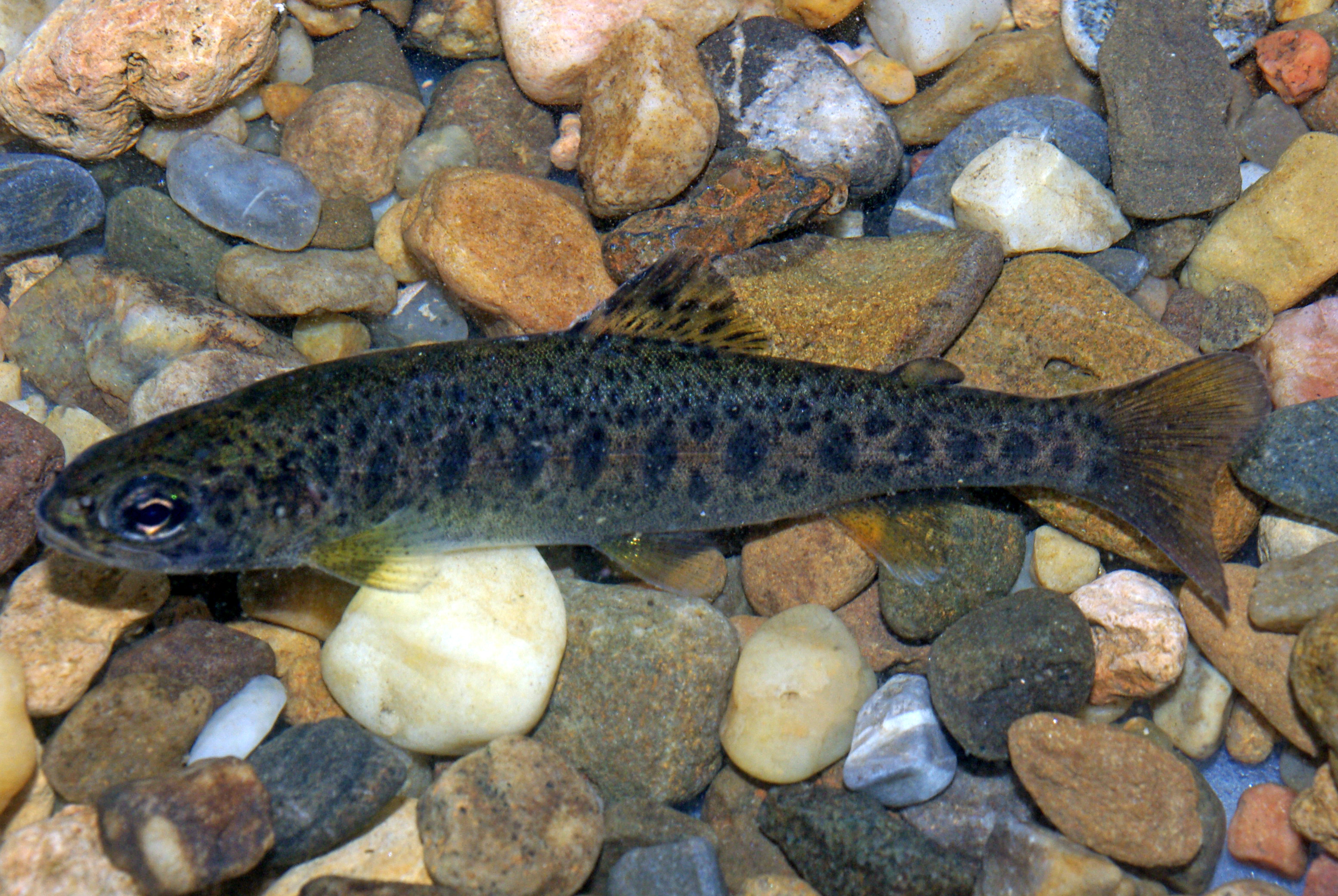
Typical juvenile rainbow trout showing parr marks

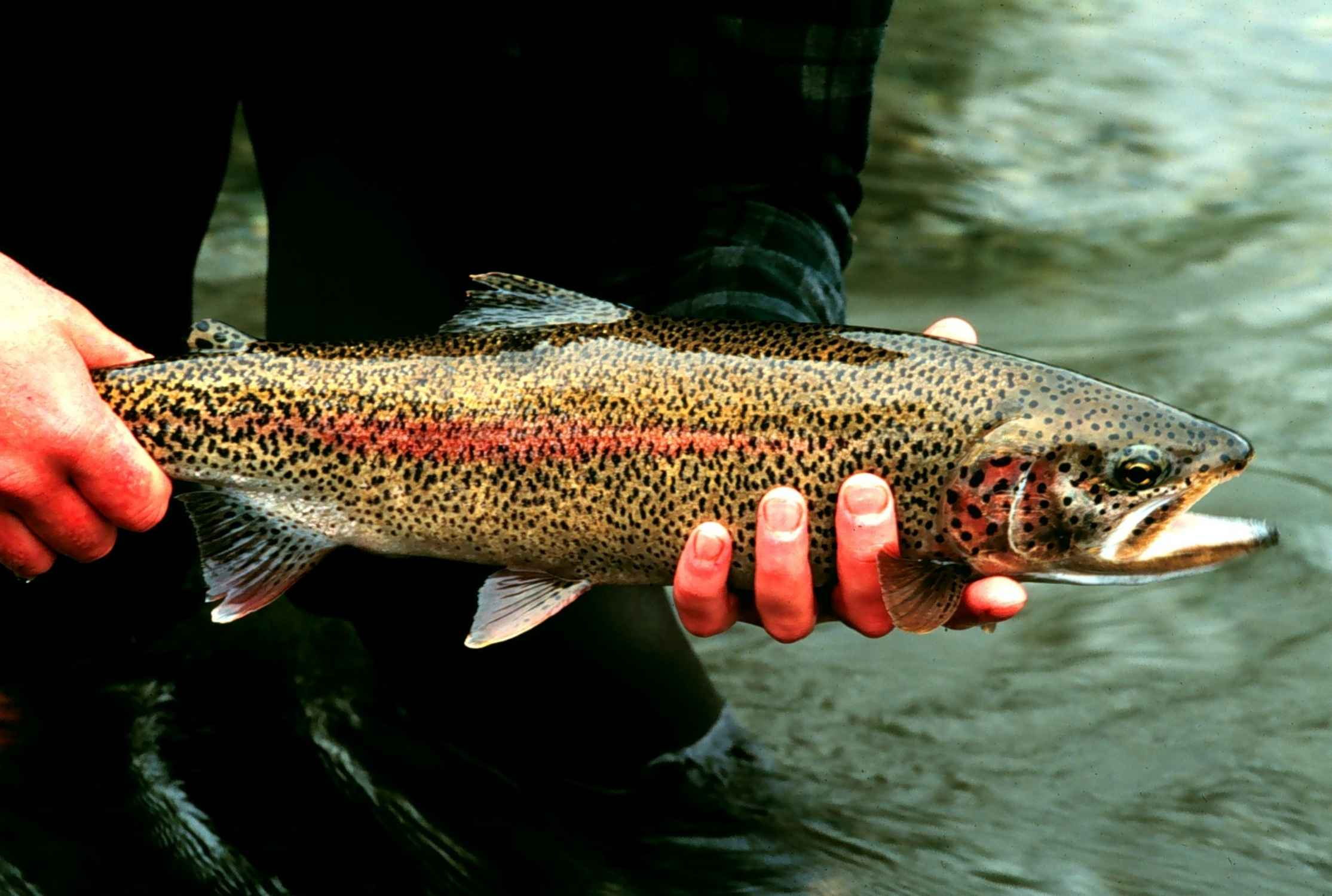
Typical adult rainbow trout

Freshwater resident rainbow trout usually inhabit and spawn in small to moderately large, well-oxygenated, shallow rivers with gravel bottoms. They are native to the alluvial or freestone streams that are typical tributaries of the Pacific basin but introduced rainbow trout have established wild, self-sustaining populations in other river types such as bedrock and spring creeks. Lake-resident rainbow trout are usually found in moderately deep, cool lakes with adequate shallows and vegetation to support the production of sufficient food sources. Lake populations generally require access to gravelly-bottomed streams to be self-sustaining.

Spawning sites are usually a bed of fine gravel in a riffle above a pool. A female trout clears a redd in the gravel by turning on her side and beating her tail up and down. Female rainbow trout usually produce 2000 to 3000 4-to-5-millimetre (5/32–3/16 in) eggs per kilogram of weight. During spawning, the eggs fall into spaces between the gravel, and immediately the female begins digging at the upstream edge of the nest, covering the eggs with the displaced gravel. As eggs are released by the female, a male moves alongside and deposits milt (sperm) over the eggs to fertilize them. The eggs usually hatch in about four to seven weeks although the time of hatching varies greatly with region and habitat. Newly hatched trout are called sac fry or alevin. In approximately two weeks, the yolk sac is completely consumed, and fry commence feeding mainly on zooplankton. The growth rate of rainbow trout varies with area, habitat, life history, and quality and quantity of food. As fry grow, they begin to develop "parr" marks or dark vertical bars on their sides. In this juvenile stage, immature trout are often called "parr" because of the marks. These small juvenile trout are sometimes called 'fingerlings' because they are approximately the size of a human finger. In streams where rainbow trout are stocked for sport fishing, but no natural reproduction occurs, some of the stocked trout may survive and grow or "carryover" for several seasons before they are caught or perish.

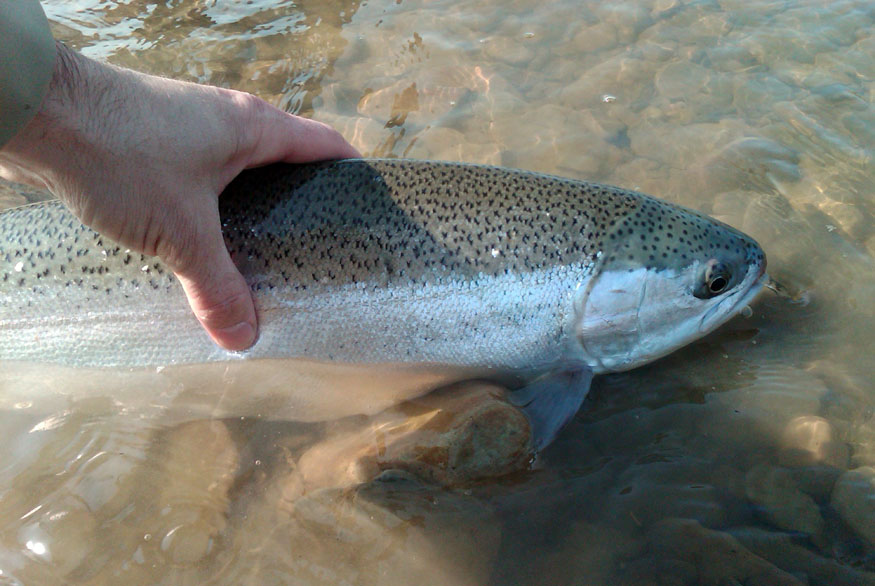
Steelhead from Lake Erie

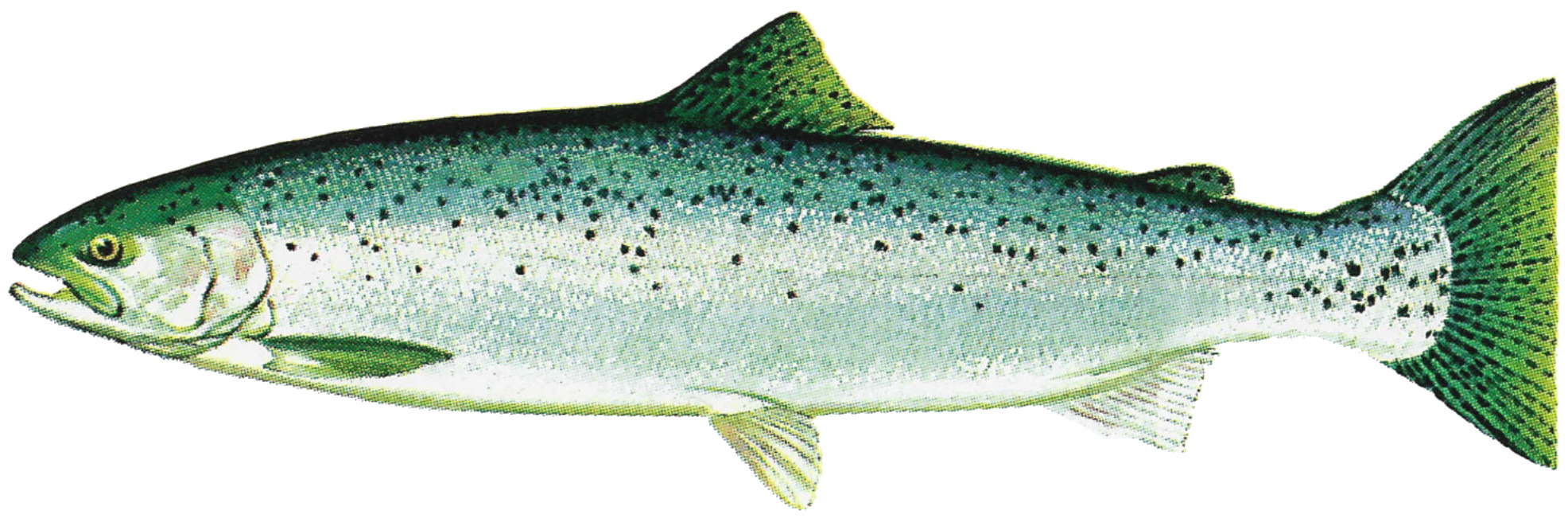
Male ocean-phase steelhead

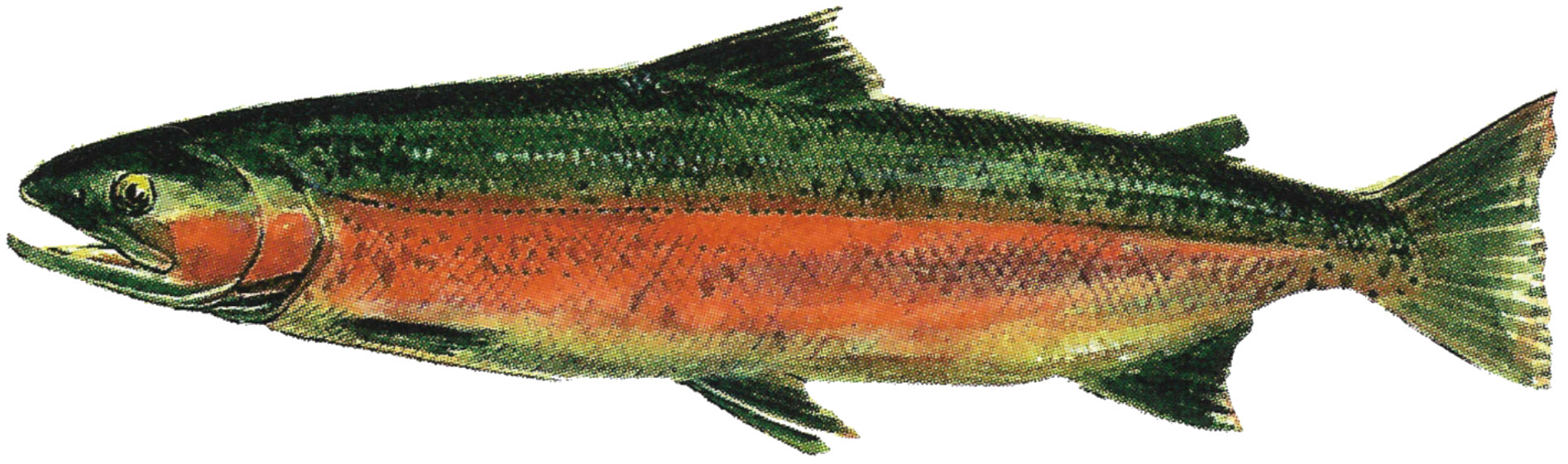
Male spawning-phase steelhead

=== Steelhead life cycle ===
The oceangoing (anadromous) form, including those returning for spawning, are known as steelhead in Canada and the U.S. In Tasmania they are commercially propagated in sea cages and are known as ocean trout, although they are the same species.

Like salmon, steelhead return to their original hatching grounds to spawn. Similar to Atlantic salmon, but unlike their Pacific Oncorhynchus salmonid kin, steelhead are iteroparous (able to spawn several times, each time separated by months) and make several spawning trips between fresh and salt water, although fewer than 10 percent of native spawning adults survive from one spawning to another. The survival rate for introduced populations in the Great Lakes is as high as 70 percent. As young steelhead transition from freshwater to saltwater, a process called "smoltification" occurs where the trout undergoes physiological changes to allow it to survive in seawater. There are genetic differences between freshwater and steelhead populations that may account for the smoltification in steelhead.

Juvenile steelhead may remain in the river for one to three years before smolting and migrating to sea. Individual steelhead populations leave the ocean and migrate into their freshwater spawning tributaries at different times of the year. Two general forms exist—"summer-run steelhead" and "winter-run steelhead". Summer-run fish leave the ocean between May and October before their reproductive organs are fully mature. They mature in freshwater while en route to spawning grounds where they spawn in the spring. Summer-run fish generally spawn in longer, more inland rivers such as the Columbia River. Winter-run fish are ready to spawn when they leave the ocean, typically between November and April, and spawn shortly after returning to fresh water. Winter-run fish generally spawn in shorter, coastal rivers typically found along the Olympic Peninsula and British Columbia coastline, and summer-run fish are found in some shorter, coastal streams. Once steelhead enter riverine systems and reach suitable spawning grounds, they spawn just like resident freshwater rainbow trout.

=== Growth and oxidative stress on mitochondria ===
During periods of rapid growth and aging, trout display high levels of metabolic activity. High metabolic activity has been correlated with increased levels of oxidative stress and decreased machinery repair in rainbow trout. During high oxidative stress, the mitochondria are the most important organelle contributing to tissue damage because of their role in metabolism and production of reactive oxygen species. In a study done by Almaida-Pagàn et al., researchers identified changes to the heart and brain mitochondrial membrane phospholipid composition in rainbow trout due to the differing levels of oxidative stress each organ faced during a high-stress time such as rapid growth and development. Stock rainbow trout of ages 1, 2, and 4 years had their heart and brain mitochondria isolated and analyzed for fatty acid composition. The tissues showed an overall similar percentage of total phospholipids but differed in the types and proportions of phospholipids. With age, the heart showed more unsaturated phospholipids, which are more susceptible to peroxidation, and thus, damage. The brain mitochondria of rainbow trout show decreased levels of docosahexaenoic acid and a lower peroxidation index, suggesting a lower susceptibility to damage by oxidative stress and a different reaction to growth compared to heart mitochondria. During the trout's development into an adult, a time of intense growth, the mitochondrial membrane composition and fluidity changes, which can cause defects in the electron transport chain. These defects combined with altered machinery repair and reactive oxygen species may cause more detrimental effects on the mitochondria in the fish as it matures.

== Feeding ==
Rainbow trout are predators with a varied diet and will eat nearly anything they can capture. They are not as piscivorous or aggressive as brown trout or chars, though adults still feed heavily on other fish. Rainbow trout, including juvenile steelhead in fresh water, routinely feed on larval, pupal, and adult forms of aquatic insects (typically caddisflies, stoneflies, mayflies and aquatic diptera). They also eat fish eggs and adult forms of terrestrial insects (typically ants, beetles, grasshoppers, and crickets) that fall into the water, as well as algae. Other prey includes small fish up to one-third of their length, crayfish, shrimp, and other crustaceans. As rainbow trout grow, the proportion of fish consumed increases in most populations. Some lake-dwelling forms may become planktonic feeders. In rivers and streams populated with other salmonid species, rainbow trout eat varied fish eggs, including those of salmon, brown and cutthroat trout, mountain whitefish, and the eggs of other rainbow trout. Rainbows also consume decomposing flesh from the carcasses of other fish. They have even been observed to have consumed hatchling snakes, such as the barred grass snake (Natrix helvetica). Adult steelhead in the ocean feed primarily on other fish, squid and amphipods.

Other prey can occasionally include small rodents, amphibians, and birds.

== Range ==
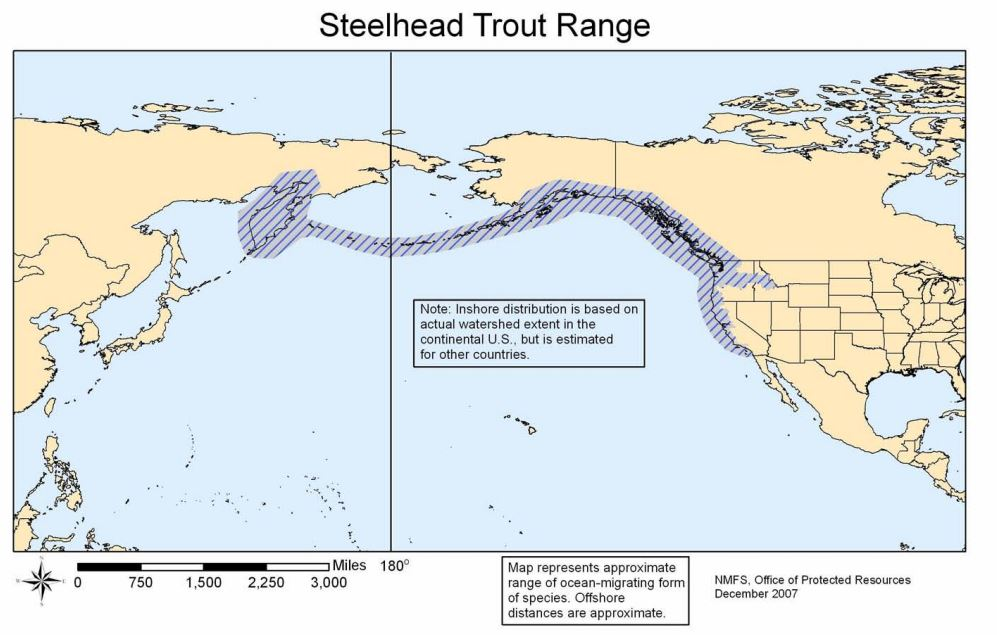
Native range of steelhead, the anadromous form of O. mykiss

The native range of Oncorhynchus mykiss is in the coastal waters and tributary streams of the Pacific basin, from the Kamchatka Peninsula in Russia, east along the Aleutian Islands, throughout southwest Alaska, the Pacific coast of British Columbia and southeast Alaska, and south along the west coast of the U.S. to northern Mexico. It is claimed that the Mexican forms of Oncorhynchus mykiss represent the southernmost native range of any trout or salmon (Salmonidae), though the Formosan landlocked salmon (O. masou formosanus) in Asia inhabits a similar latitude. The range of coastal rainbow trout (O. m. irideus) extends north from the Pacific basin into tributaries of the Bering Sea in northwest Alaska, while forms of the Columbia River redband trout (O. m. gairdneri) extend east into the upper Mackenzie River and Peace River watersheds in British Columbia and Alberta, Canada, which eventually drain into the Beaufort Sea, part of the Arctic Ocean. Since 1875, the rainbow trout has been widely introduced into suitable lacustrine and riverine environments throughout the United States and around the world. Many of these introductions have established wild, self-sustaining populations.

== Artificial propagation ==
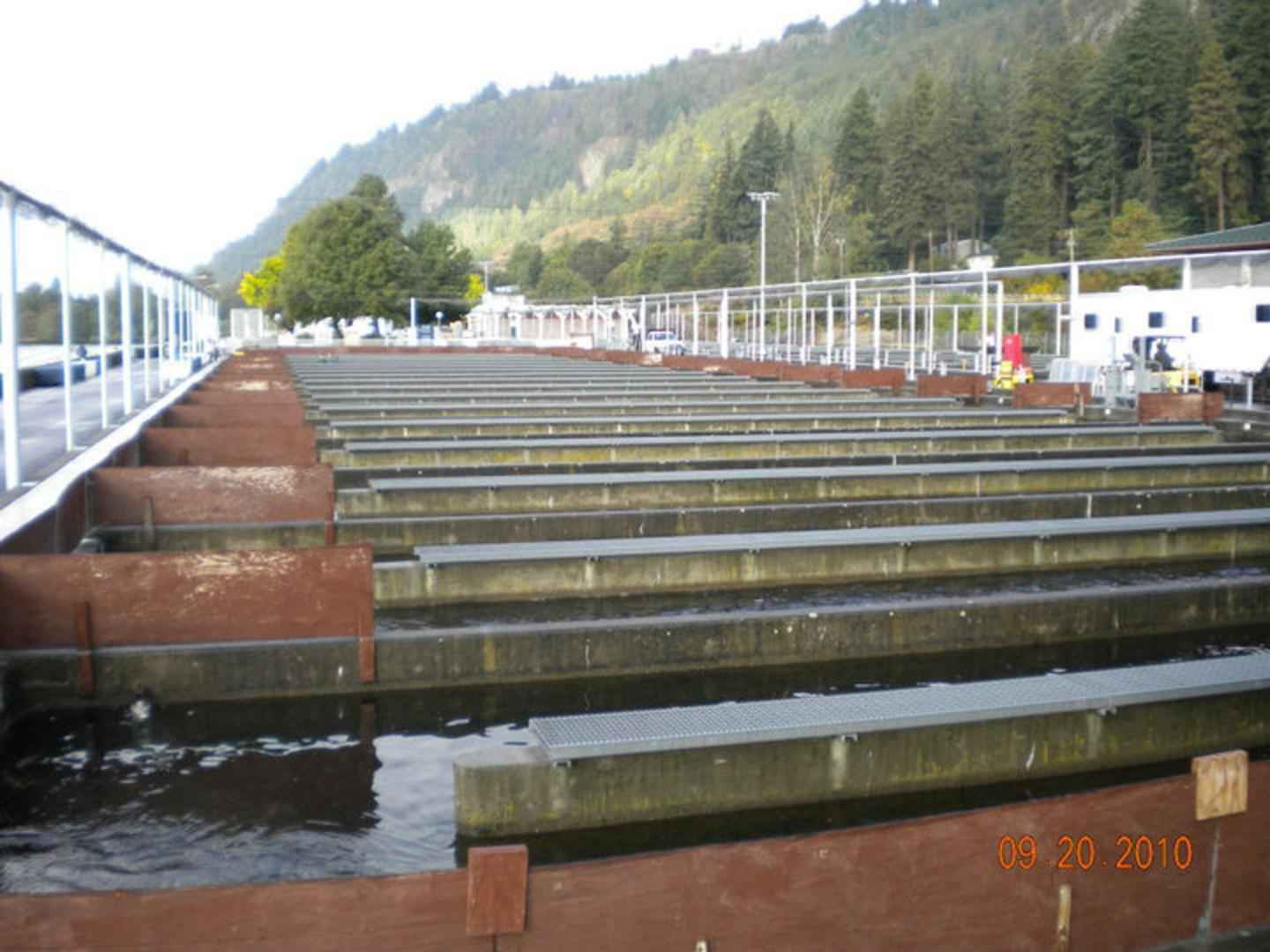
U.S. Fish and Wildlife Service fish hatchery

Since 1870, rainbow trout have been artificially propagated in fish hatcheries to restock streams and introduce them into non-native waters. The first rainbow trout hatchery was established on San Leandro Creek, a tributary of San Francisco Bay, in 1870, and trout production began in 1871. The hatchery was stocked with the locally native rainbow trout, and likely steelhead of the coastal rainbow trout subspecies (O. m. irideus). The fish raised in this hatchery were shipped to hatcheries out of state for the first time in 1875, to Caledonia, New York, and then in 1876 to Northville, Michigan. In 1877, another California rainbow trout hatchery, the first federal fish hatchery in the National Fish Hatchery System, was established on Campbell Creek, a McCloud River tributary. The McCloud River hatchery indiscriminately mixed coastal rainbow trout eggs with the eggs of local McCloud River redband trout (O. m. stonei). Eggs from the McCloud hatchery were also provided to the San Leandro hatchery, thus making the origin and genetic history of hatchery-bred rainbow trout somewhat diverse and complex. In the U.S., there are hundreds of hatcheries operated by the United States Fish and Wildlife Service and various state agencies and tribal governments propagating rainbow trout for conservation and recreational sport fishing. Six of ten Canadian provinces have rainbow trout farms, with Ontario leading production.

=== Aquaculture ===
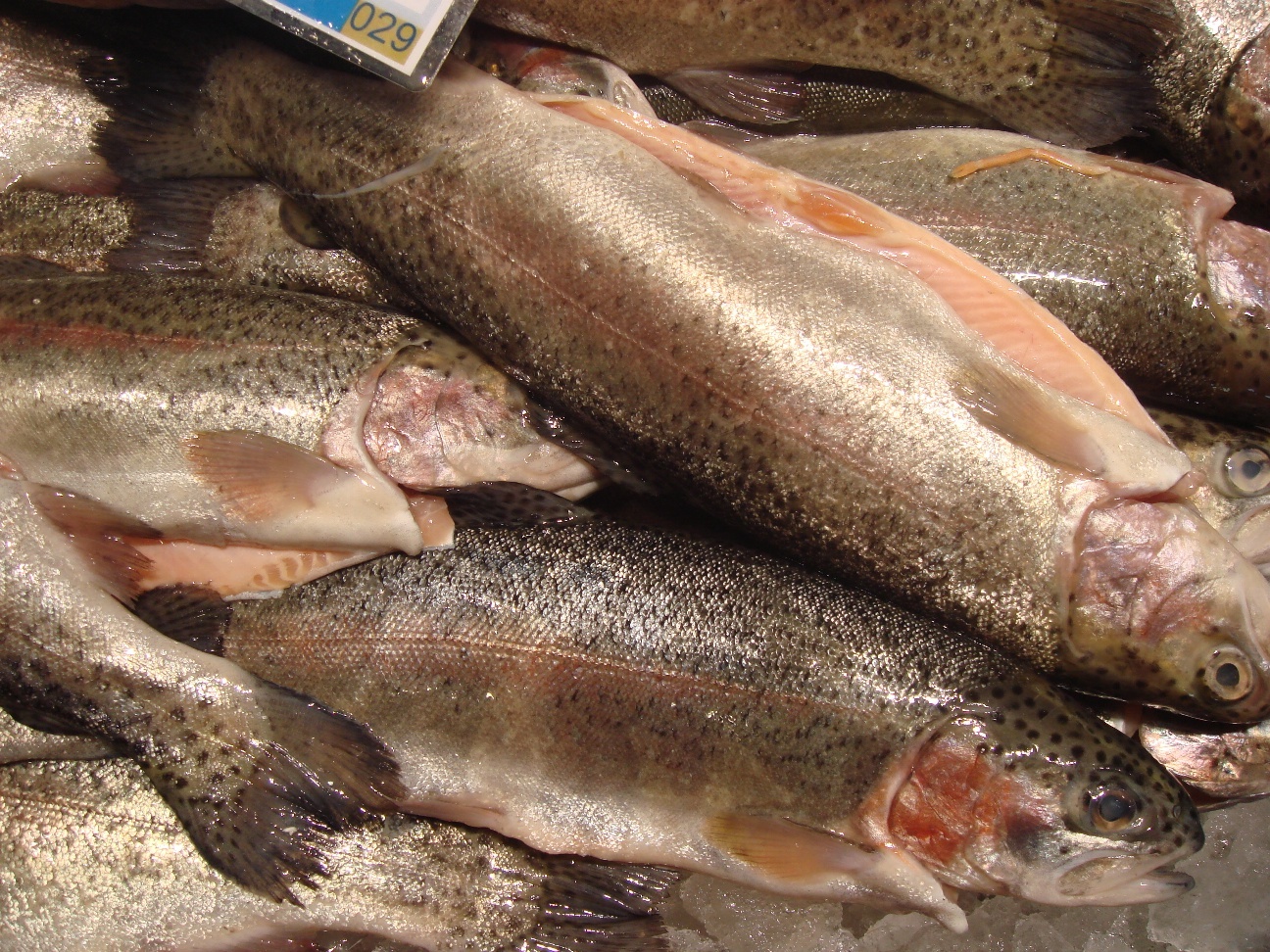
Rainbow trout, cleaned and iced, in a fish market in Western Australia

Global aquaculture production of Rainbow trout (Oncorhynchus mykiss) in million tonnes from 1950 to 2022, as reported by the FAO

Rainbow trout are commercially farmed in many countries throughout the world. The practice began in the late 19th century, and since the 1950s commercial production has grown dramatically. Worldwide, in 2007, 604,695 tonnes (666,562 short tons) of farmed rainbow trout were harvested with a value of about US$2.6 billion. The largest producer is Chile. In Chile and Norway, sea cage production of steelhead has expanded to supply export markets. Inland production of rainbow trout to supply domestic markets has increased in countries such as Italy, France, Germany, Denmark, and Spain. Other significant trout-producing countries include the U.S., Iran, Turkey, the United Kingdom, and Lesotho. While the U.S. rainbow trout industry as a whole is viewed as ecologically responsible, trout raised elsewhere are not necessarily farmed with the same methods.

About three-quarters of U.S. production comes from Idaho, particularly the Snake River area, due in part to the quality and temperature of the water available there. California and Washington also produce significant numbers of farmed trout. In the east, Pennsylvania, North Carolina and West Virginia have farming operations. Rainbow trout farming is one of the largest finfish aquaculture industries in the U.S. They are raised inland in facilities where raceways or ponds have continuously flowing water with little pollution and a low risk of escape. The U.S. industry is noted for using best management practices. Imports constitute only about 15 percent of farmed rainbows sold in the U.S., and nearly all domestic production is consumed within the country; very little is exported. The U.S. produces about 7 percent of the world's farmed trout. Rainbow trout, especially those raised in farms and hatcheries, are susceptible to enteric redmouth disease. A considerable amount of research has been conducted on redmouth disease, given its serious implications for rainbow trout farming. The disease does not infect humans.

There have been recent interest and efforts in introducing a rainbow trout species that can be completely fed on a vegan diet through genetic selection. Research from a study team led by USDA research geneticist Dr. Ken Overturf concluded that such natural genetic variation of vegan trouts does exist and believe they can produce rainbow trouts that can be completely fed on a 100% plant-based diet.

== Conservation ==
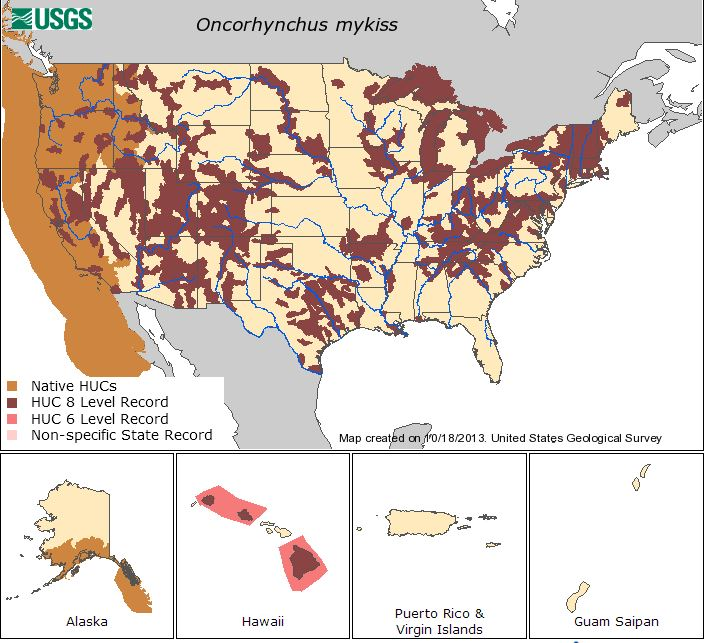
U.S. range map for O. mykiss; native (light brown) and introduced (dark brown and pink)

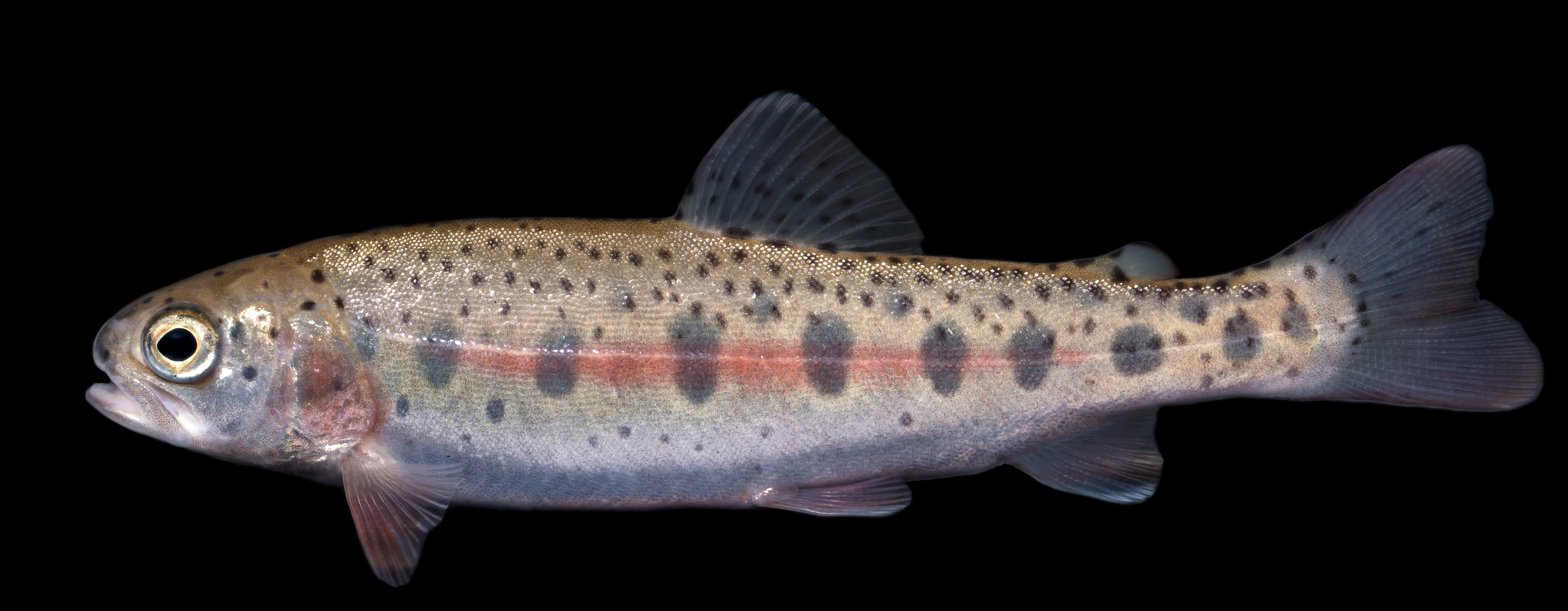
3-4 month old juvenile at Gavins Point National Fish Hatchery

Populations of many rainbow trout subspecies, including anadromous forms (steelhead) of O. m. irideus (coastal rainbow trout) and O. m. gairdneri (Columbia River redband trout), have declined in their native ranges due to over-harvest, habitat loss, disease, invasive species, pollution and hybridization with other subspecies, and some introduced populations, once healthy, have declined for the same reasons. As a consequence, some rainbow populations, particularly anadromous forms within their native range, have been classified as endangered, threatened or species of special concern by federal or state agencies. Rainbow trout, and subspecies thereof, are currently a U.S. Environmental Protection Agency-approved indicator species for acute freshwater toxicity testing.

Many non-profit organizations have formed to protect, conserve and restore native rainbow trout and steelhead populations. Generally, in partnership with various universities, state, federal and tribal agencies, and private interests, these organizations sponsor projects to restore habitat, prevent habitat loss and promote awareness of threats to native trout populations.

Trout Unlimited (TU) is a non-profit organization dedicated to the conservation of North American freshwater streams, rivers, and associated upland habitats for trout, salmon, other aquatic species, and people. A typical TU project is the Circle Creek Fish Passage Project, in which access to a spawning stream is being improved for steelhead and other salmonid species. The Wild Salmon Center, an international coalition of Russian, Canadian and U.S. scientists, sponsors the Kamchatka Steelhead Project, a 20-year (1994–2014) scientific program to study and conserve the present condition of Kamchatkan steelhead ("mikizha"), a species listed in the Red Data Book of Russia. Other high-profile organizations involved in rainbow trout conservation include California Trout, which protects wild trout and other salmonids in the waters of California. The Steelhead Society of British Columbia promotes the wellbeing of wild salmonids in British Columbia. In 1997, a group of approximately 40 ichthyologists, biologists and naturalists from several U.S. and Mexican institutions formed a collaborative group—Truchas Mexicanas—to study the diversity of Mexican native trout, most of which are considered subspecies of O. mykiss.

=== Hybridization and habitat loss ===
Rainbow trout, primarily hatchery-raised fish of the coastal rainbow trout subspecies (O. m. irideus) introduced into waters inhabited with cutthroat trout, will breed with cutthroats and produce fertile hybrids called cutbows. In the case of the westslope cutthroat trout (O. clarki lewisi), hybridization with introduced rainbow and Yellowstone cutthroat trout (O. clarki bouvieri) is threatening the westslope cutthroat trout with genomic extinction. Such introductions into the ranges of redband trout (O. m. gairdneri, newberrii, and stonei) have severely reduced the range of pure stocks of these subspecies, making them "species of concern" in their respective ranges.

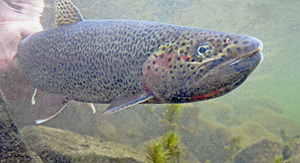
A cutbow from the Gulf of Alaska

Within the range of the Kern River golden trout of Southern California, hatchery-bred rainbows introduced into the Kern River have diluted the genetic purity of the Kern River rainbow trout (O. m. gilberti) and golden trout (O. m. aguabonita) through intraspecific breeding. The Beardslee trout (O. m. irideus var. beardsleei), a genetically unique lake-dwelling variety of the coastal rainbow trout that is isolated in Lake Crescent (Washington), is threatened by the loss of its only spawning grounds in the Lyre River to siltation and other types of habitat degradation.

=== Invasive species and disease ===
==== Whirling disease ====
Myxobolus cerebralis is a myxosporean parasite of salmonids (salmon, trout, and their allies) that causes whirling disease in pen farmed salmon and trout and also in wild fish populations. It was first described in rainbow trout introduced to Germany a century ago, but its range has spread and it has appeared in most of Europe, northern Asia, the U.S., South Africa and other countries. In the 1980s, M. cerebralis was found to require Tubifex tubifex (a kind of segmented worm) to complete its life cycle. The parasite infects its hosts with its cells after piercing them with polar filaments ejected from nematocyst-like capsules.

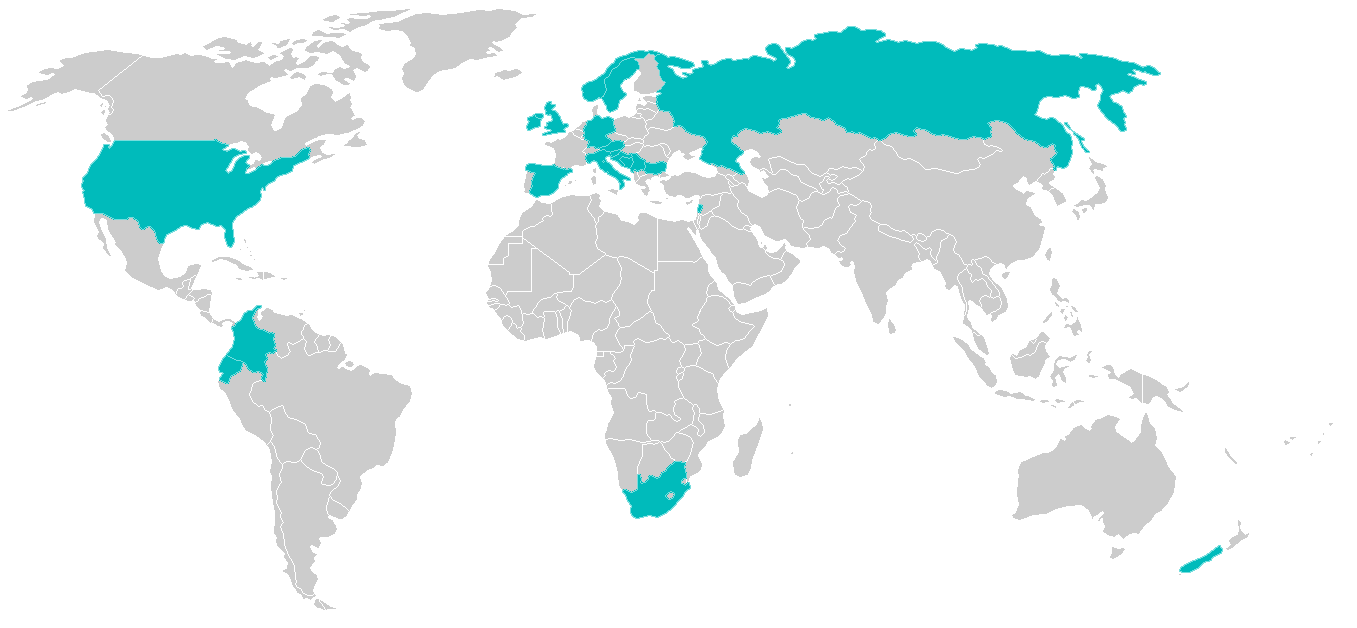
M. cerebralis has been reported in Germany (1893), Italy (1954), USSR (1955), including Sakhalin Island (1960), U.S. (1958), Bulgaria (1960), Yugoslavia (1960), Sweden (1966), South Africa (1966), Scotland (1968), New Zealand (1971), Ecuador (1971), Norway (1971), Colombia (1972), Lebanon (1973), Ireland (1974), Spain (1981) and England (1981).

This parasite was originally a mild pathogen of brown trout in central Europe and other salmonids in northeast Asia, and the spread of the rainbow trout has greatly increased its impact. Having no innate immunity to M. cerebralis, rainbow trout are particularly susceptible, and can release so many spores that even more resistant species in the same area, such as Salmo trutta, can become overloaded with parasites and incur mortalities of 80 to 90 percent. Where M. cerebralis has become well-established, it has caused a decline or even elimination of whole cohorts of fish.

The parasite M. cerebralis was first recorded in North America in 1956 in Pennsylvania, but until the 1990s, whirling disease was considered a manageable problem affecting only rainbow trout in hatcheries. It eventually became established in the natural waters of the Rocky Mountain states (Colorado, Wyoming, Utah, Montana, Idaho, New Mexico), where it is damaging several sport fishing rivers. Some streams in the western U.S. lost 90 percent of their trout. Whirling disease threatens recreational fishing, which is important for the tourism industry, a key component of the economies of some U.S. western states. For example, in 2005 anglers in Montana spent approximately $196,000,000 in activities directly related to trout fishing in the state. Some of the salmonids that M. cerebralis infects (bull trout, cutthroat trout, and anadromous forms of rainbow trout—steelhead) are already threatened or endangered, and the parasite could worsen their population decline.

==== New Zealand mud snail ====
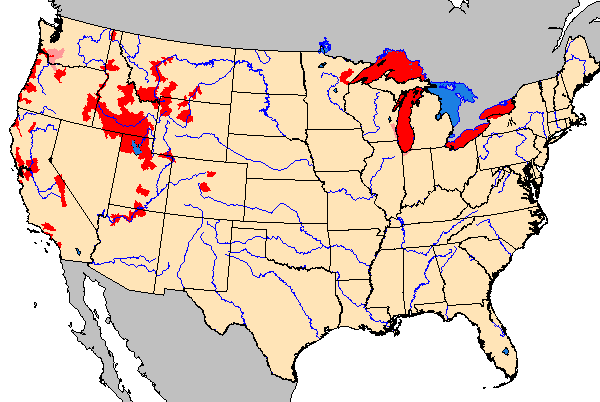
Distribution of New Zealand mud snail within the U.S. in 2009

The New Zealand mud snail (Potamopyrgus antipodarum), once endemic to New Zealand, has spread widely and has become naturalised and an invasive species in many areas including Australia, Asia (Japan, in the Garmat Ali River in Iraq since 2008), Europe (since 1859 in England), and North America (U.S. and Canada: Thunder Bay in Ontario since 2001, British Columbia since July 2007), most likely inadvertently during human activity. It can reach concentrations greater than 500,000 per square metre (46,000/sq ft), endangering the food chain by outcompeting native snails and water insects for food, leading to sharp declines in native populations. There is evidence North American fishes are unable to digest the tiny but hard shells of the mud snail, and that their presence may result in poor growth outcomes for rainbow trout.

The mud snail was first detected in the U.S. in Idaho's Snake River in 1987. Since then, the snail has spread to the Madison River, Firehole River, and other watercourses around Yellowstone National Park, and has been discovered throughout the western U.S. The exact means of transmission is unknown, but it is likely that it was introduced in water transferred with live game fish and has been spread by ship ballast or contaminated recreational equipment such as wading gear.

==== Didymo ====
Didymosphenia geminata, commonly known as didymo or rock snot, is a species of diatom that produces nuisance growths in freshwater rivers and streams with consistently cold water temperatures. In New Zealand, invasive didymo can form large mats on the bottom of rivers and streams in late winter. It is not considered a significant human health risk, but it can affect stream habitats and sources of food for fish, including rainbow trout, and make recreational activities unpleasant. Even though it is native in North America, it is considered a nuisance organism or invasive species.

==== Redmouth disease ====
Enteric redmouth disease is a bacterial infection of freshwater and marine fish caused by the pathogen Yersinia ruckeri. It is primarily found in rainbow trout and other cultured salmonids. The disease is characterized by subcutaneous hemorrhaging of the mouth, fins, and eyes. It is most commonly seen in fish farms with poor water quality. Redmouth disease was first discovered in Idaho rainbow trout in the 1950s.

=== Removal methods ===
Some fisheries are focused on removing rainbow trout in order to reestablish native trout populations. This can be done by poisoning rivers with chemicals such as antimycin or rotenone which have been declared safe in the U.S. by the Environmental Protection Agency. Once the chemicals have dissipated, native trout are released into the river. Another method is to use electrofishing which enables the fish to be caught alive and harvested or re-located. This technique has been used in the Great Smoky Mountains National Park to rid it of rainbow trout that were introduced in the 1930s and have thrived ever since. They are hoping to re-establish native brook trout in at least some of the 3,400 km (2,100 mi) river system. Neither method of control is 100% effective and are best regarded as methods to change the relative population sizes of fish species.

=== Steelhead declines ===
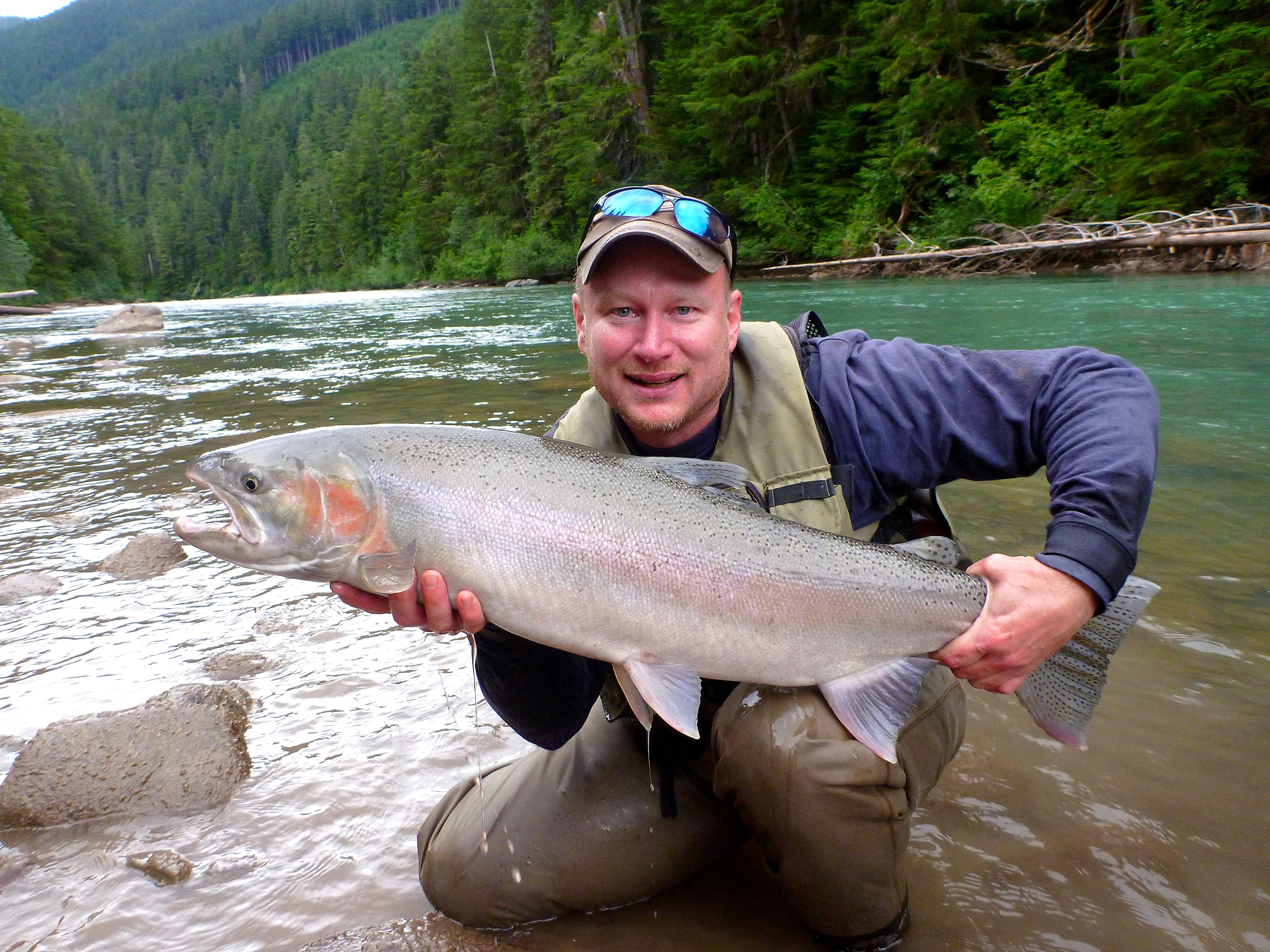
A large Steelhead caught on the Zymoetz (Copper) River in British Columbia

Steelhead populations in parts of its native range have declined due to a variety of human and natural causes. While populations in Alaska and along the British Columbia coast are considered healthy, populations in Kamchatka and some populations along the U.S. West Coast are in decline. The U.S. National Marine Fisheries Service has 15 identified distinct population segments, in Washington, Oregon, and California. Eleven of these populations are listed under the U.S. Endangered Species Act, ten as threatened and one as endangered. One distinct population segment on the Oregon coast is designated a U.S. Species of Concern.

The Southern California distinct population segment, which was listed as endangered in 2011, has been affected by habitat loss due to dams, confinement of streams in concrete channels, water pollution, groundwater pumping, urban heat island effects, and other byproducts of urbanization. Steelhead in the Kamchatka Peninsula are threatened by over-harvest, particularly from poaching and potential development, and are listed in the Red Data Book of Russia that documents rare and endangered species.

==== Hatchery stocking influence ====
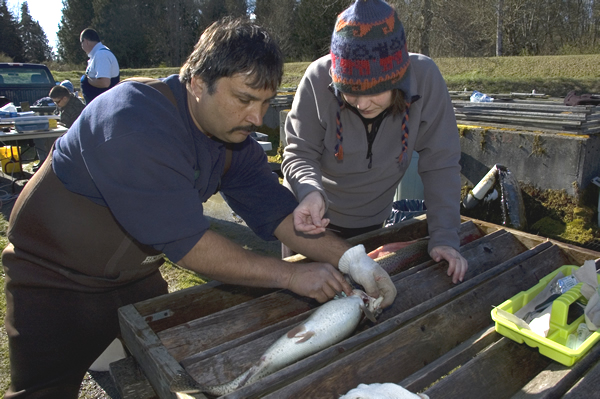
Steelhead hatchery broodstock inspection

Several studies have shown that almost all California coastal steelhead are of native origin, despite over a century of hatchery stocking. Genetic analysis shows that the South Central California Coast and Southern California populations from Malibu Creek north, including the San Gabriel River, Santa Ana River, and San Mateo Creek, are not hatchery strains. Steelhead from Topanga Creek and the Sweetwater River were partly, and those from San Juan Creek completely, of hatchery origin. Genetic analysis has also shown that the steelhead in the streams of the Santa Clara County and Monterey Bay basins are not of hatchery origin, including the Coyote Creek, Guadalupe River, Pajaro River, Permanente Creek, Stevens Creek, San Francisquito Creek, San Lorenzo River, and San Tomas Aquino Creek basins. Natural waterfalls and two major dams have isolated Russian River steelhead from freshwater rainbow trout forms above the impassable barriers; a 2007 genetic study of fin samples collected from steelhead at 20 different sites both above and below passage barriers in the watershed found that although 30 million hatchery trout were stocked in the river from 1911 to 1925, the steelhead remain of native and not hatchery origin.

Releases of conventionally reared hatchery steelhead pose ecological risks to wild steelhead populations. Hatchery steelhead are typically larger than the wild forms and can displace wild-form juveniles from optimal habitats. The dominance of hatchery steelhead for optimal microhabitats within streams may reduce wild steelhead survival as a result of reduced foraging opportunities and increased rates of predation.

== Uses ==
=== Fishing ===
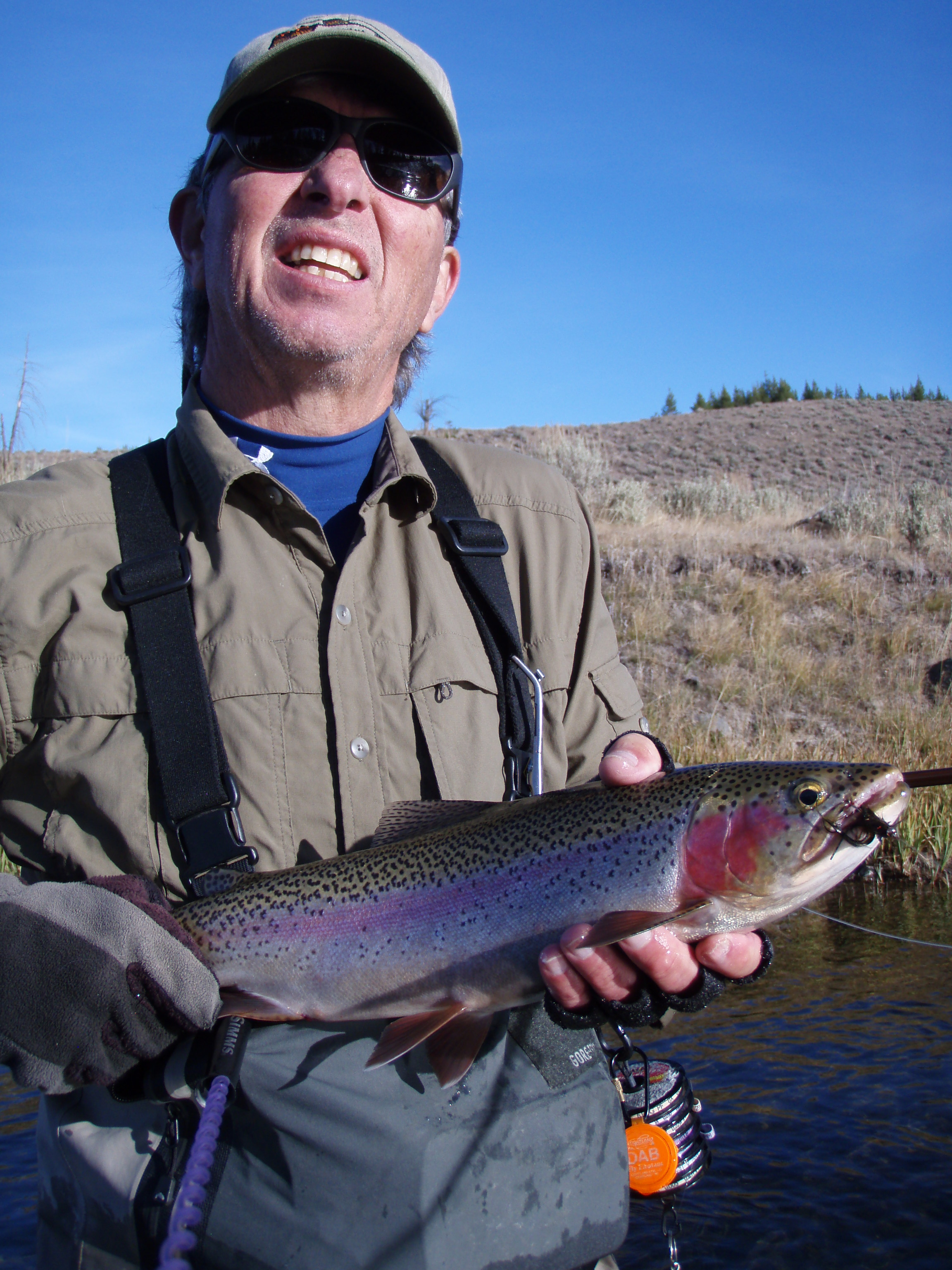
Rainbow trout are a popular game fish for fly fishers.

Rainbow trout and steelhead are highly regarded game fish among anglers. Rainbow trout are a popular target for fly fishers, and several lure fishing methods are used. The use of lures presented via spinning, casting, or trolling techniques is common. Rainbow trout can also be caught on various live and dead natural baits. Many anglers consider the rainbow trout the hardest-fighting trout species, as this fish is known for leaping when hooked and putting up a powerful struggle. It is considered one of the top five sport fish in North America, and the most important game fish west of the Rocky Mountains.

There are tribal commercial fisheries for steelhead in Puget Sound, the Washington coast, and in the Columbia River, but there has been controversy regarding overharvesting of native stocks.

The highly desirable sporting qualities and adaptability of the rainbow trout to hatchery rearing and new habitats resulted in it being introduced to many countries around the world by or at the behest of sport fishermen. Many of these introductions have resulted in environmental and ecological problems, as the introduced rainbow trout disrupt local ecosystems and outcompete or prey upon indigenous fishes. Other introductions to support sport angling in waters either devoid of fish or with seriously depleted native stocks have created world-class fisheries such as in the Firehole River in Yellowstone National Park and in the Great Lakes.

==== Record ====
The International Game Fish Association recognizes the world record for rainbow trout as a fish caught on Saskatchewan's Lake Diefenbaker by Sean Konrad on September 5, 2009, which weighed 48 lb (22 kg). The record is controversial because the fish was a genetically modified triploid and was part of a large number of triploid rainbow trout which escaped from an aquaculture facility.

=== Water purification ===
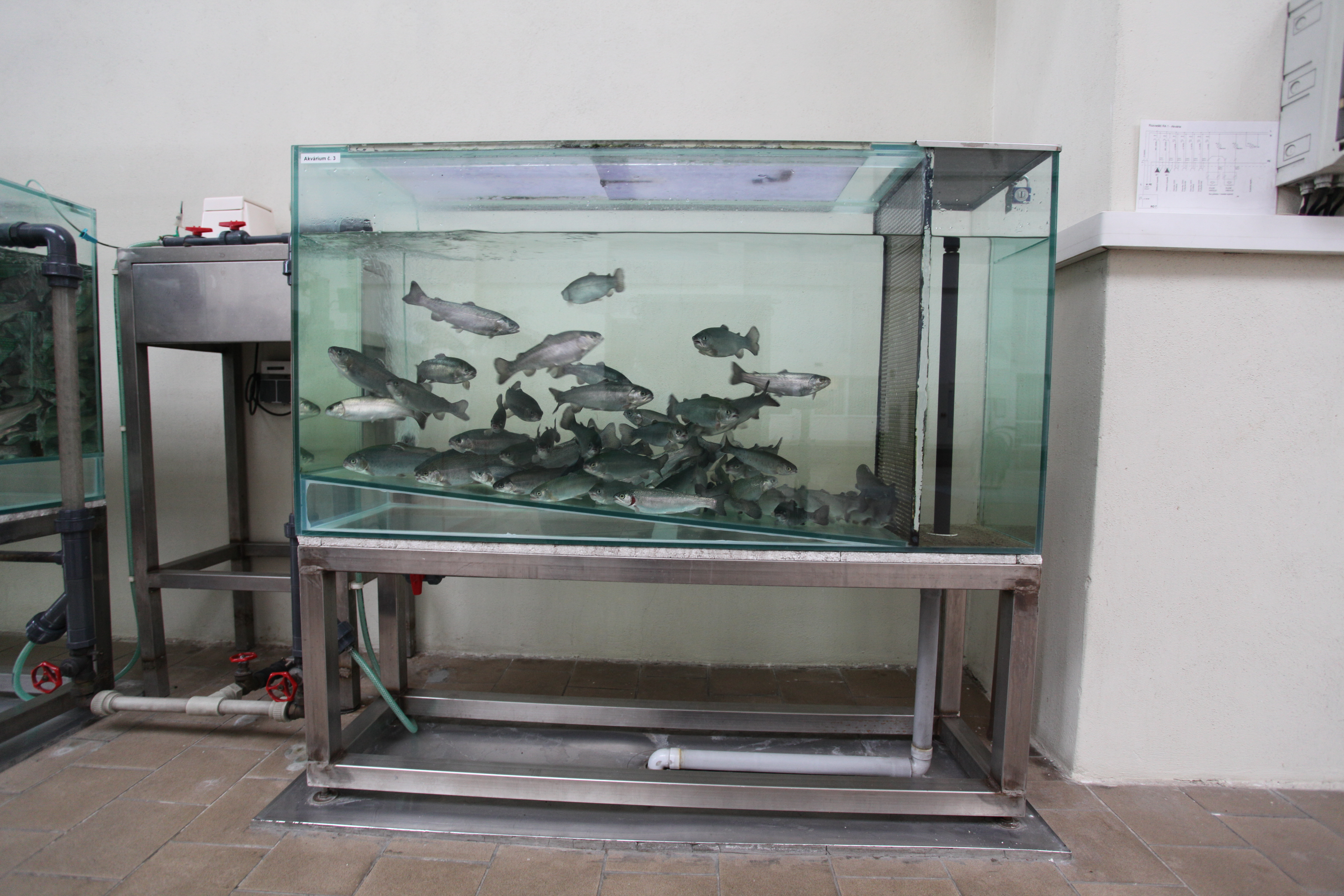
Rainbow trout in a water purification facility

Rainbow trout is sometimes used as a biological indicator for water quality in water purification facilities.

=== As food ===
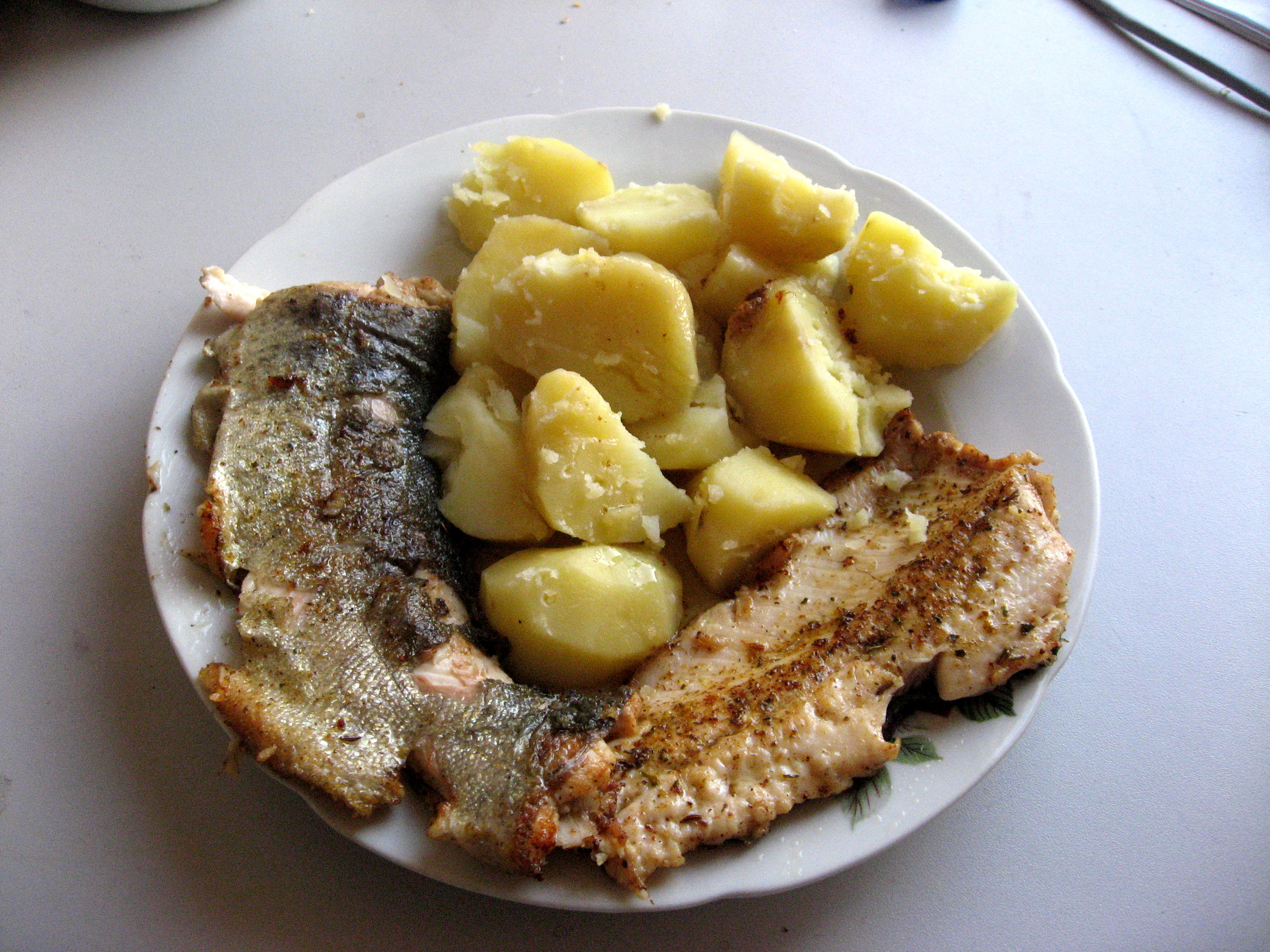
Rainbow trout and potatoes

Rainbow trout is popular in Western cuisine; both wild-caught and farmed fish are eaten. It has tender flesh and a mild, somewhat nutty flavor. Wild fish has a stronger, gamier taste than farmed fish. While the taste of wild-caught trout is often promoted as superior, rainbow trout and "steelhead" sold in American restaurants is typically farmed. Farmed rainbow trout are considered one of the safest fish to eat and are noted for high levels of vitamin B and a generally appealing flavor. Seafood Watch ranks farmed rainbow trout as a "Best Choice" fish for human consumption. In Montana, it is illegal to sell or market wild-caught rainbow trout, which are legally classified as game fish.

The color and flavor of the flesh depend on the diet and freshness of the trout. Farmed trout and some populations of wild trout, especially anadromous steelhead, have reddish or orange flesh as a result of high astaxanthin levels in their diets. Astaxanthin is a powerful antioxidant that may be from a natural source or a synthetic trout feed. Rainbow trout raised to have pinker flesh from a diet high in astaxanthin are sometimes sold in the U.S. with labeling calling them "steelhead". As wild steelhead are in decline in some parts of their range, farmed rainbow trout are viewed as a preferred alternative. In Chile and Norway, rainbow trout farmed in saltwater sea cages are sold labeled as steelhead.

Trout can be cooked as soon as they are cleaned, without scaling, skinning, or filleting. If cooked with the skin on, the meat tends to hold together better. While trout sold commercially in Europe is often prepared and served this way, most trout sold commercially in the United States have the fish heads removed and have been fully or partially deboned and filleted. Medium to heavy-bodied white wines, such as chardonnay, sauvignon blanc, or pinot gris, are typical wine pairings for trout.

In Mainland China, since 2018, it was ruled by an industrial association that rainbow trout can be labelled and sold as salmon (2018 Chinese salmon controversy).
