= McCloud River =

McCloud River McLeod's Fork, McLoud River
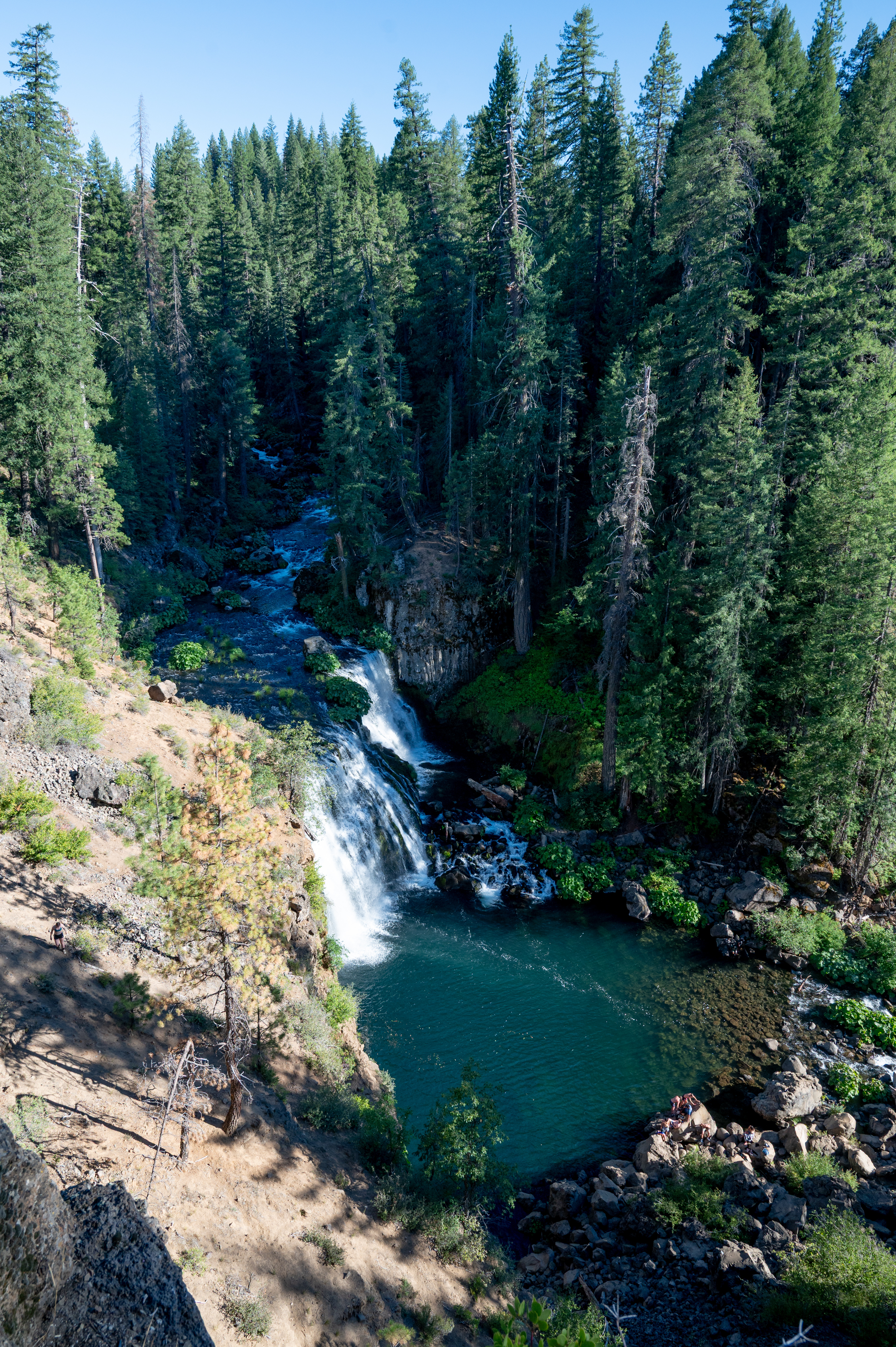
- Middle McCloud Falls on the McCloud River

- Location of the mouth of the McCloud River in California

Location
- Country: United States
- State: California
- City: McCloud

Physical characteristics
- Source
  - location: Southeast of Mount Shasta, Siskiyou County, California
  - coordinates: 41°13′12″N 121°46′21″W
  - elevation: 4,677 ft (1,426 m)
- Mouth
  - location: McCloud River Arm of Lake Shasta, Sacramento River, Shasta County, California
  - coordinates: 40°46′13″N 122°18′13″W
  - elevation: 1,066 ft (325 m)
- Length: 77 mi (124 km)
- Basin size: 674 sq mi (1,750 km^{2})
- Discharge
  - location: near the mouth
  - average: 775 cu ft/s (21.9 m^{3}/s)
  - minimum: 109 cu ft/s (3.1 m^{3}/s)
  - maximum: 51,300 cu ft/s (1,450 m^{3}/s)

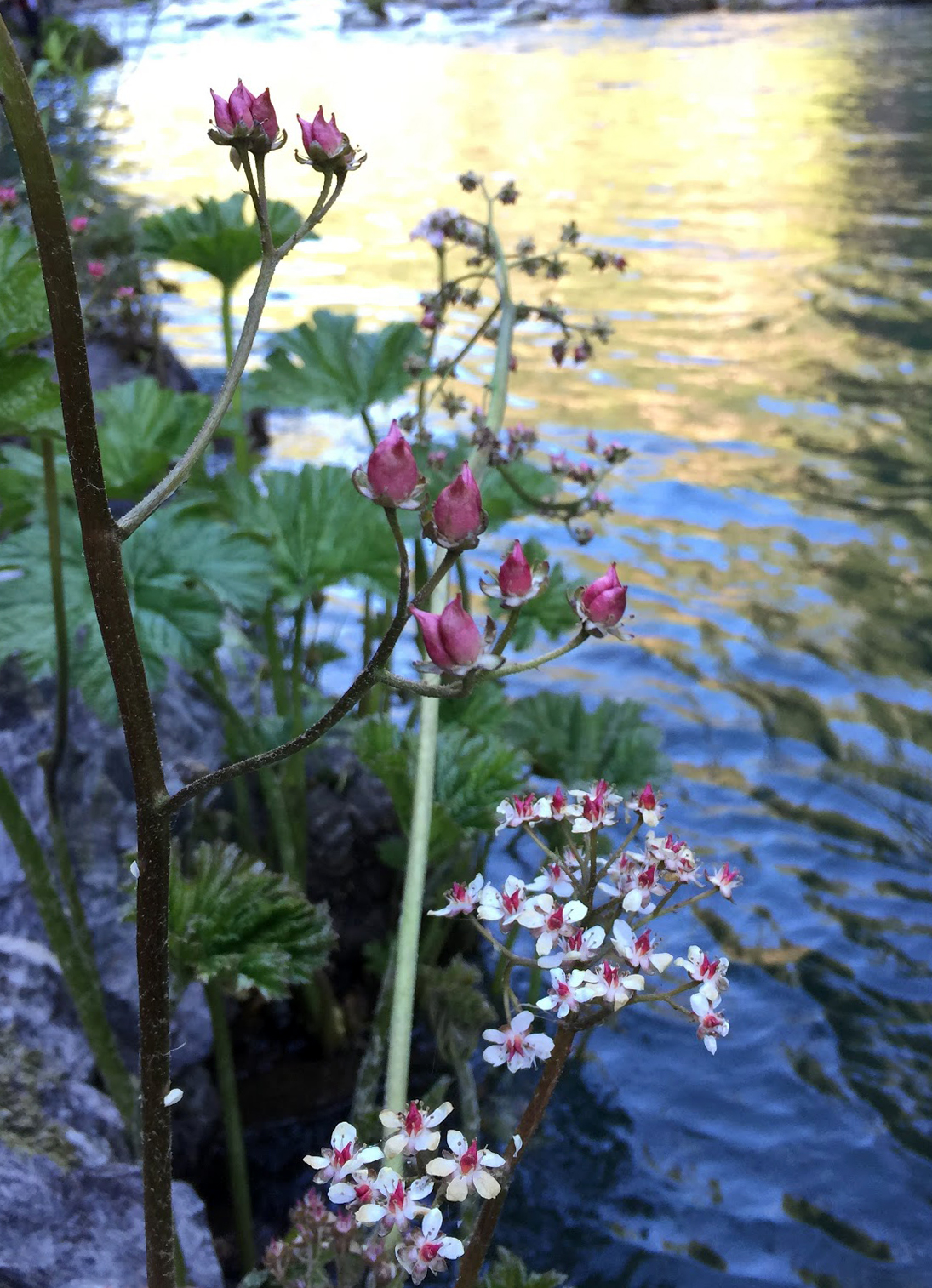
Indian rhubarb (Darmera peltata), on the edge of the McCloud River in May.

The McCloud River is a 77.1-mile (124.1 km) long river that flows east of and parallel to the upper Sacramento River, in Siskiyou County and Shasta County in northern California in the United States. Protected under California's Wild and Scenic Rivers Act (1972), it drains a scenic mountainous area of the Cascade Range, including part of Mount Shasta. It is a tributary of the Pit River, which in turn flows into the Sacramento River. The three rivers join in Shasta Lake, formed by Shasta Dam north of Redding.

== Naming ==
The river was originally known as the "McLeod River", after the Hudson's Bay Company hunter and trapper Alexander Roderick McLeod who explored it during the winter of 1829–1830. By the 1860s, the spelling "McCloud" was widely used, likely because that was the conventional American spelling of the Scottish name, and perhaps in part to honor California pioneer Ross McCloud, who settled there in 1855.

== Geography ==
The McCloud River watershed drains 674 square miles (1,750 km^{2}). It rises from several spring-fed streams in Colby Meadows in the Cascades approximately 10 miles (16 km) southeast of Mount Shasta in Siskiyou County. It flows initially west, passing south of Mount Shasta and receiving streams that drain the southern slope of the peak. East of McCloud it forms a series of waterfalls which tumble over basaltic lava flows, known collectively as the McCloud River Falls or Falls of the McCloud River.

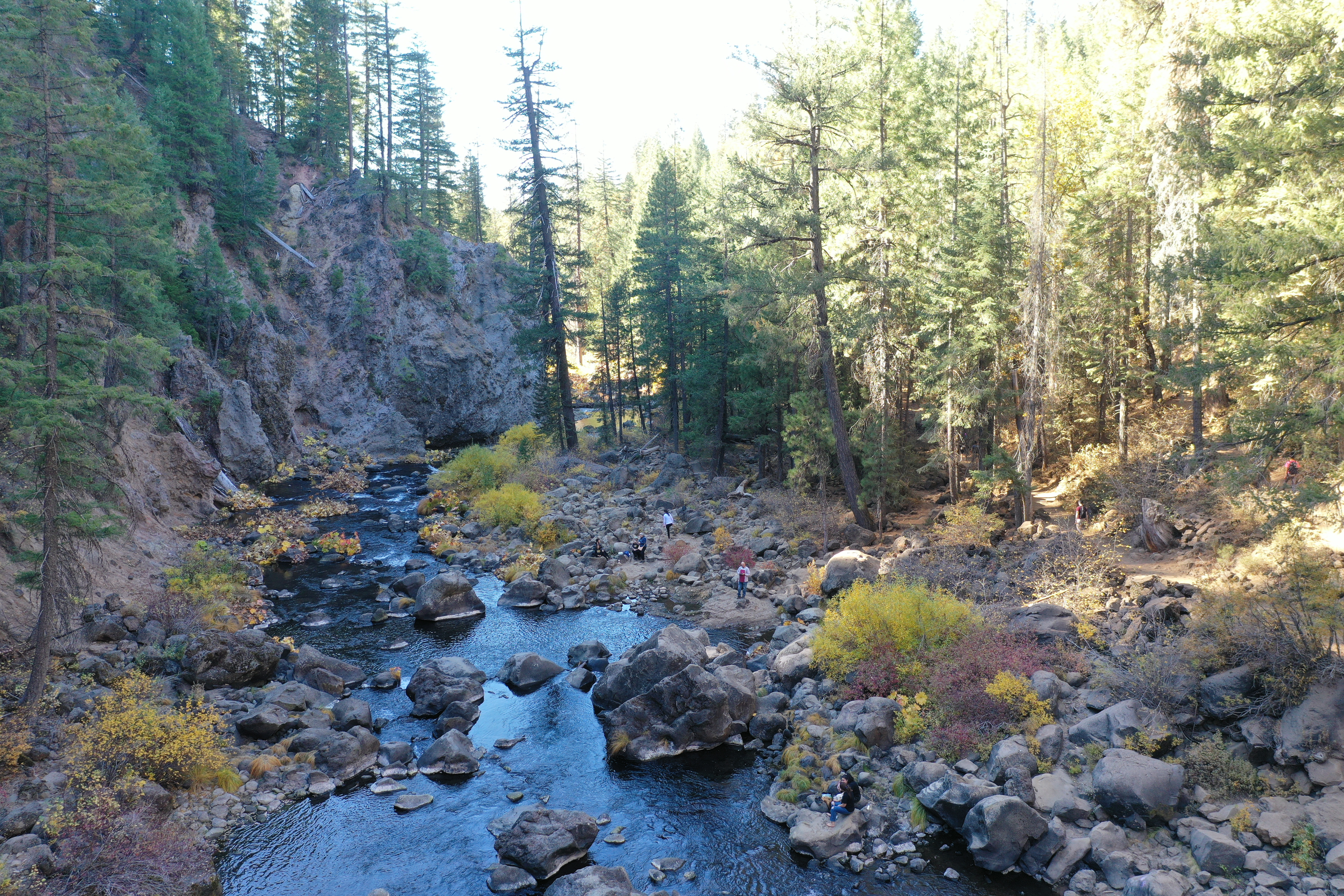
McCloud River below Middle Falls

Below the falls the river flows generally south-southwest through the Lake McCloud reservoir and through a deep canyon in the Shasta-Trinity National Forest. It joins Shasta Lake, formed by the Shasta Dam, approximately 15 miles (24 km) north of Redding, with the lower 10 miles (16 km) of the river forming the middle arm of the lake. The McCloud arm joins the Pit River arm just east of the Pit River Bridge on Interstate 5, 5 miles (8.0 km) north of the city of Shasta Lake.

Major tributaries to the Upper McCloud River include Mud and Tate Creeks (plus Big Springs). Hawkins, Claiborne, Yét Atwam (formerly Squaw Valley), and Chatterdown Creeks are the major tributaries to the McCloud River below McCloud Reservoir.

== River modifications ==
In 1945, the completion of the Shasta Dam on the Sacramento River harmed the river's salmon population. It also led to the flooding of 95% of Winnemem Wintu territory, this included about 250 cultural sites, such as burial sites, and whole villages. The river system is closely tied to the Winnemem Wintu Tribe's culture as the tribe once lived in the greater Siskiyou Region and depended greatly on the river as a source of food and a setting for cultural ceremonies. The Central Valley Project Land Acquisition Act of 1941 had issued portions of over 4,000 acres (1,600 ha) of land in order to recompense tribal territories that were flooded and damaged. The U.S. Federal Government failed to deliver compensation. A cemetery was created for the 183 Winnemem Wintu bodies that were displaced from their burial sites along the McCloud.

The river is dammed at McCloud River Dam, to provide water for the McCloud-Pit Hydroelectric Project. The McCloud Tunnel diverts water from the McCloud River east to Iron Canyon Reservoir; the water is discharged into the Pit River at James B. Black Powerhouse. Further downstream, the diverted water boosts power generation at Pit 6 and Pit 7 Dams before flowing into Shasta Lake. The overall generating capacity is 364 megawatts. Built in the late 1960s, the system is owned and operated by PG&E.

As a consequence of damming, the average flow in the lower McCloud River declined greatly, from an annual mean of 1,699 cu ft/s (48.1 m^{3}/s) between 1946 and 1965 to an annual mean of 775 cu ft/s (21.9 m^{3}/s) between 1967 and 2013. The greatest impact on river flow is during the summer months when the dam release is only 200 cubic feet per second (5.7 m^{3}/s). There is little impact on winter peak flows, which mostly originate in the watershed area below the dam.

In November 2020, the Trump Administration under the direction of then U.S. Secretary of the Interior, David Bernhardt, approved plans to increase the nearby Shasta Dam by 18.5 feet (5.6 m). The flooding of 5,000 acres (2,000 ha) of the local habitat could harm the wild trout fishery as well as introduce permanent and seasonal flooding of roughly 39 sacred Winnemem Wintu Tribe sites that are located along the McCloud River.

== Recreation ==
The McCloud is generally divided into two sections. The Upper McCloud is considered to be above McCloud Reservoir, and the Lower McCloud stretches from the reservoir to Lake Shasta. The waterfalls mentioned above are all found on the Upper McCloud. The Upper McCloud is a popular destination for kayakers. There is an improved campground called Fowlers on the Upper McCloud. The Upper McCloud above Upper Falls is rarely stocked, and locating the fish often proves to be a challenge to most avid anglers, while the section from Lower Falls to Upper Falls is stocked and is open to bait fishing. The Lower McCloud is generally a fly/artificial lure fishery and catch and release fishing is greatly encouraged.

The last several miles of the McCloud comprise two private fishing clubs — the McCloud River Club (4 miles (6.4 km)) and the Bollibokka Club (10 miles (16 km)), founded in 1902 and 1904, respectively. The land encompassing the lower 7 miles (11 km) of Bollibokka Club was purchased in 2007 by the Westlands Water District, which continues to operate the historic Bollibokka Club. Westlands purchased the property to avoid risk of development of the property, to increase its entitlement to water releases from Shasta reservoir through ownership of 3,000 acres (12 km^{2}) in the watershed, and to quell opposition to plans for increases in the height of Shasta Dam, a project in which it is the largest stakeholder. The upper 3 miles (4.8 km) of the club's river holdings were purchased in 2006 by Silicon Valley real estate magnate John Arrillaga. Anglers are not allowed to set foot above the high water mark on either property. The Nature Conservancy has a site on the Lower McCloud, an outright gift from the neighboring McCloud River Club, that allows ten rods per day and unlimited hikers or birders.

There are two campgrounds on the Lower McCloud River — Ash Camp and Ah Di Nah Campground. Ash Camp is a small unimproved camp area about 1 mile (1.6 km) downstream of the McCloud Reservoir dam with 4 sites and a vault toilet. It sits at the junction of Hawkins Creek and the Lower McCloud.

While Ah Di Nah Campground is located only 3 miles (4.8 km) further downstream from Ash Camp, it is about 7 miles (11 km) of dirt road driving to get there. It is a Shasta-Trinity National Forest campground and a fee is charged for nightly camping. Ah Di Nah is popular with backpackers and anglers for its proximity to the Pacific Crest Trail and the Nature Conservancy area on the McCloud River. Bathrooms and water are available.

== Ecology ==
The McCloud once hosted a native population of bull trout (Salvelinus confluentus), but the species became extinct in the McCloud watershed after McCloud Reservoir cut off the fish from their spawning grounds. The last reported Bull trout (misidentified as Dolly Varden trout (Salvelinus malma) at that time, Dollys are not from this southern latitude) was caught in the 1980s.

The Upper McCloud and its tributaries above Middle Falls are home to the McCloud River redband (Oncorhynchus mykiss stonei), a native subspecies of rainbow trout. These redband trout were proposed for endangered species status, as their genetics have been introgressed by hybridization with hatchery stocked rainbow trout. The Falls of the McCloud River form a natural barrier to rainbow trout migration historically. An amplified fragment length polymorphism study show Sheepheaven Creek (the type specimen) genetics to be sufficiently different to warrant subspecific status. Conservation efforts have included transplanting the relative pure Sheepheaven Creek strain into Swamp and Trout Creeks.

In 2025, adult winter-run Chinook salmon were spotted in the river for the first time in almost a century.

== Gallery ==
Images of the McCloud River falls

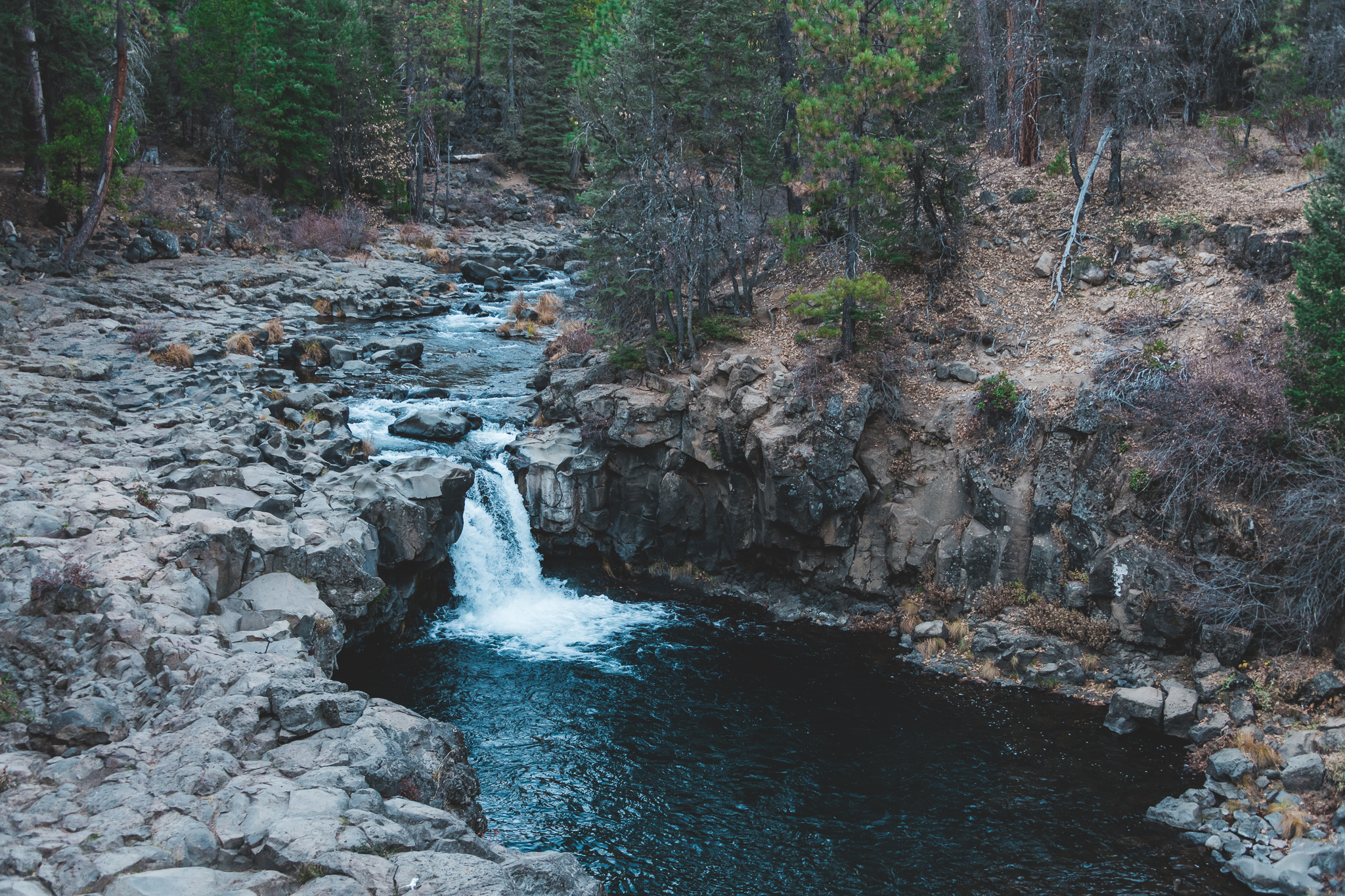
Lower Falls

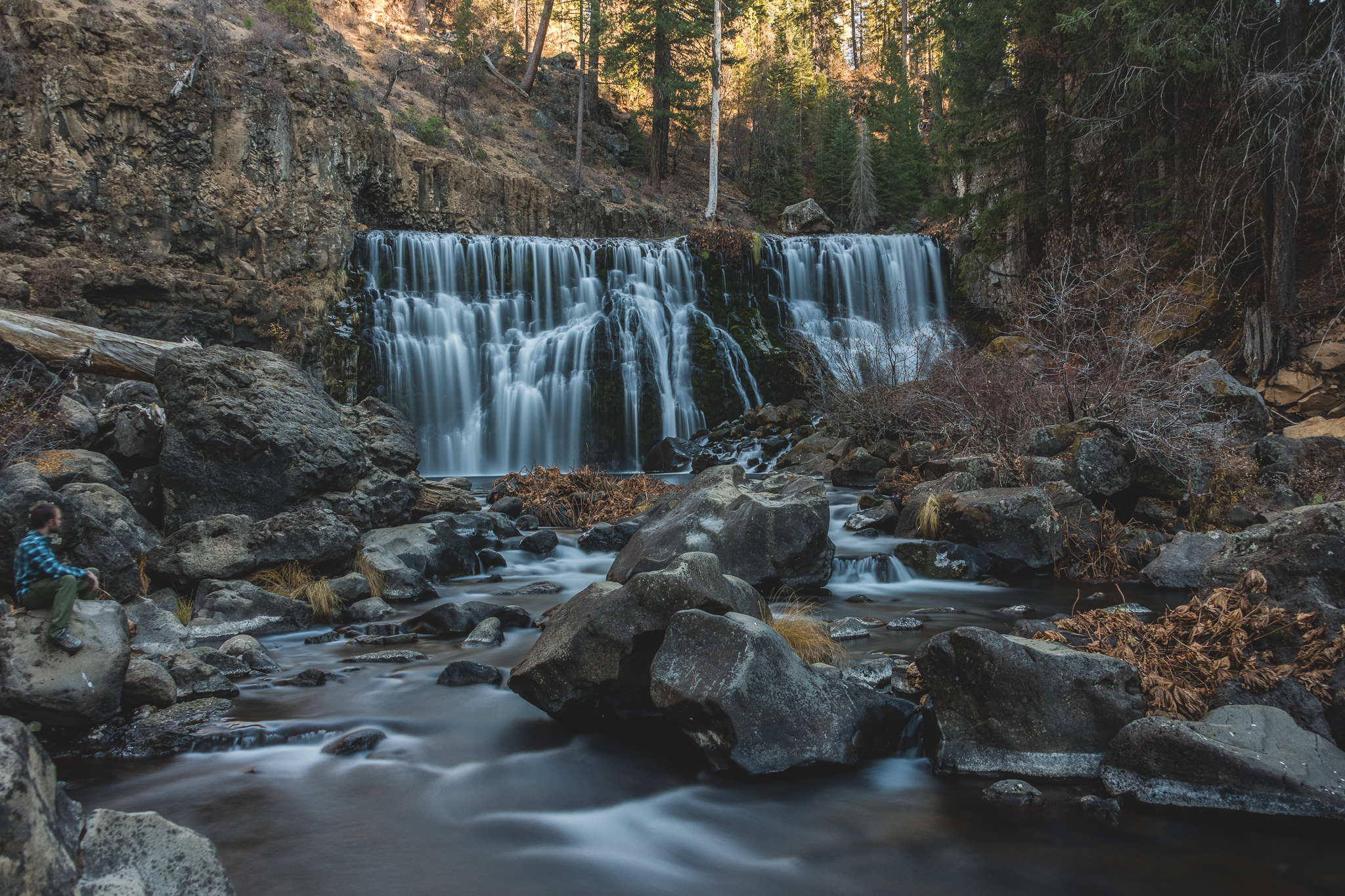
Middle Falls

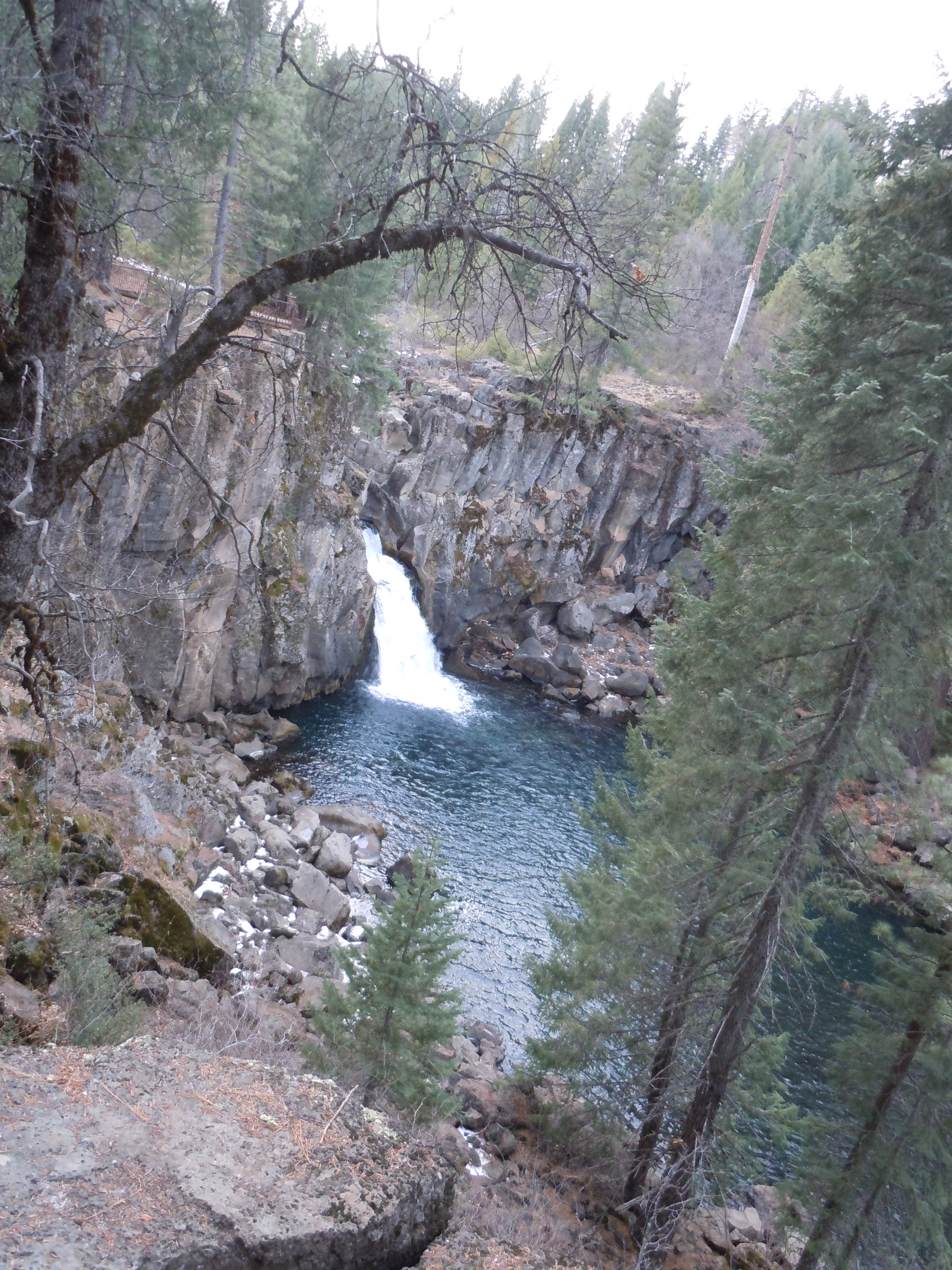
Upper Falls
