= Sheepheaven Creek redband trout =

Scientific classification
- Kingdom: Animalia
- Phylum: Chordata
- Class: Actinopterygii
- Division: Teleostei
- Order: Salmoniformes
- Family: Salmonidae
- Genus: Oncorhynchus
- Species: O. mykiss
- Population: Sheepheaven Creek redband trout

Variety of fish

The Sheepheaven Creek redband trout is a local Californian variety of the rainbow trout (Oncorhynchus mykiss), a freshwater fish in the family Salmonidae. It is considered either a distinct western form of the McCloud River redband trout (subspecies Oncorhynchus mykiss stonei), or a subspecies of its own, which has not been scientifically named and described yet. It is native to Sheepheaven Creek, Siskiyou County, California, United States. It has been transplanted into Swamp Creek in 1972 and 1974 and into Trout Creek in 1977. They can now be found in both locations. Sheepheaven Creek redband are found to be the most distinct anatomically among all other western North American trout groups, and therefore has been suggested to merit recognition as a new subspecies. A key diagnostic character is that they have the fewest gill rakers of any western trout.

Sheepheaven Creek is used as the type locality of O. m. calisulat Campbell and Conway 2023, a taxon restricted in distribution the McCloud River drainage upstream of McCloud Falls. In this taxonomic scheme, Sheepheaven Creek is one of several genetically pure populations of a distinctive lineage of rainbow trout.
