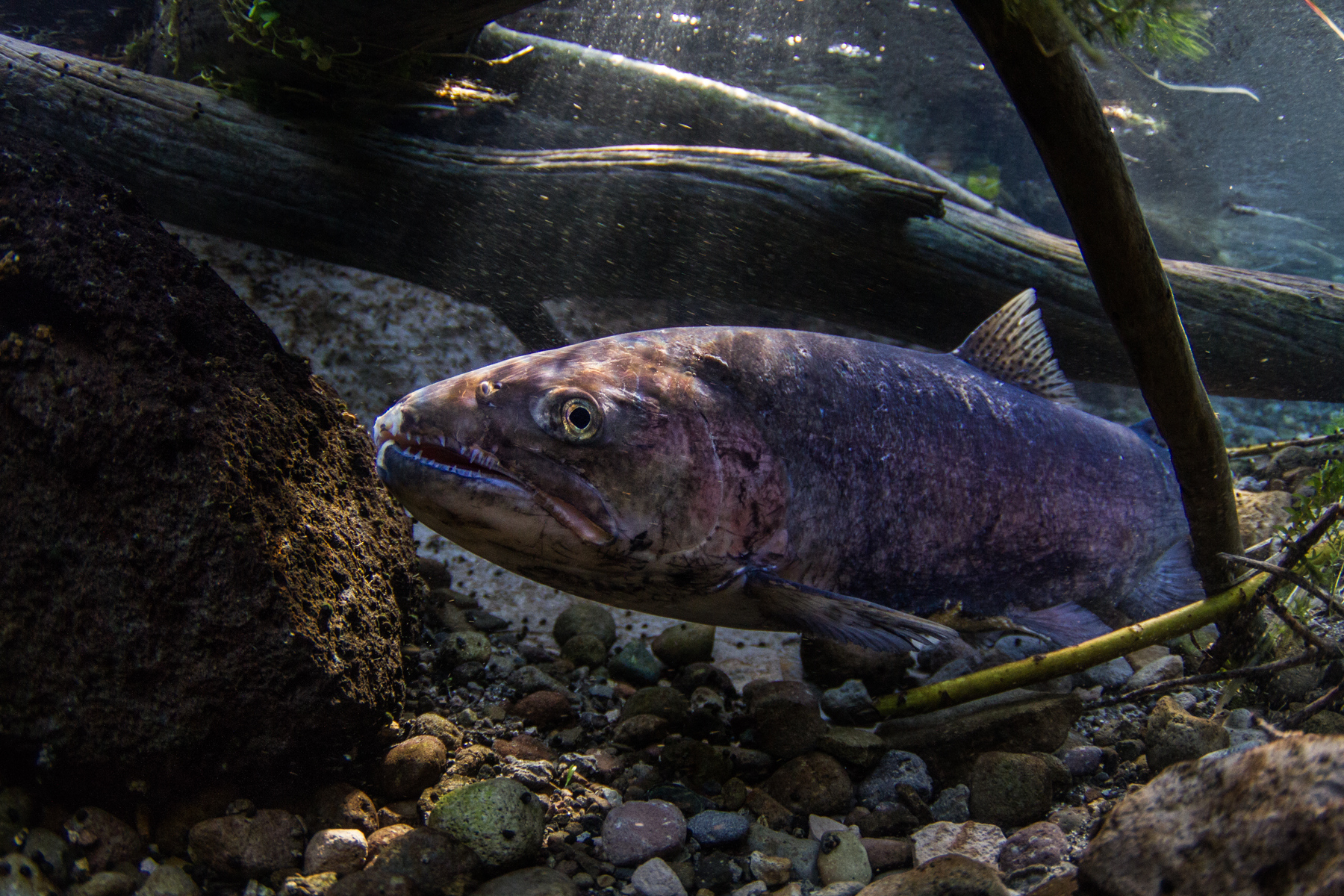
- Great Basin redband trout

Scientific classification
- Kingdom: Animalia
- Phylum: Chordata
- Class: Actinopterygii
- Order: Salmoniformes
- Family: Salmonidae
- Genus: Oncorhynchus
- Species: O. mykiss
- Subspecies: O. m. gairdneri O. m. newberrii O. m. stonei

Trinomial name
- Oncorhynchus mykiss gairdneri Oncorhynchus mykiss newberrii Oncorhynchus mykiss stonei

= Redband trout =

Subspecies group of fish

Redband trout are a group of three recognized subspecies of rainbow trout (Oncorhynchus mykiss). They occur in three distinct regions in Pacific basin tributaries and endorheic basins in the western United States. The three subspecies are the Columbia River redband trout (O. m. gairdneri), the McCloud River redband trout (O. m. stonei) and the Great Basin redband trout (O. m. newberrii).

The Columbia River redband trout is found in the Columbia River and its tributaries in Montana, Oregon, Washington and Idaho. While also being found across the great divide being known as Athabasca rainbow trout in Alberta. Anadromous populations of O. m. gairdneri are known as redband steelhead. The McCloud River redband trout is found in small tributaries of the McCloud River and Pit River which are tributaries of California's Sacramento River. The Great Basin redband trout is found in seven distinct basins in southeastern Oregon, and parts of California and Nevada on the periphery of the Great Basin. Redband trout have often been confused with cutthroat trout (Oncorhynchus clarkii). Redband trout are prized game fish.

Redband trout populations have been declining across its range as a result of habitat changes or destruction, the introduction of alien and hatchery-raised fish species, and seasonal drought. However, as of 2000, the population of Great Basin redband trout was not a candidate for listing as threatened or endangered by the standards established by the United States Department of the Interior Fish and Wildlife Service.

== Physical characteristics ==
The redband trout are generally similar in appearance to the coastal rainbow trout (O. m. irideus) but have larger, more rounded spots, parr marks that tend to remain into adulthood, are more orange-red around the lateral line and have very distinct white tips on the anal, dorsal and pectoral fins. They will exceed 10 inches (25 cm) at maturity, which they reach within three years. The redband trout subspecies find their ideal habitat in clean, cool, relatively small and low gradient streams, but are capable of enduring higher water temperatures (75–80 °F; 24–27 °C) than other trout that may co-habit the same streams. As with other trout, they feed on insects, crustaceans and forage fish, depending on their size.
