= Enteric redmouth disease =

Bacterial disease of fish

Enteric redmouth disease, or simply redmouth disease is a bacterial infection of freshwater and marine fish caused by the pathogen Yersinia ruckeri. It is primarily found in rainbow trout (Oncorhynchus mykiss) and other cultured salmonids. The disease is characterized by subcutaneous hemorrhaging of the mouth, fins, and eyes. It is most commonly seen in fish farms with poor water quality. Redmouth disease was first discovered in Idaho rainbow trout in the 1950s. The disease does not infect humans.

== Distribution of disease ==
Some fish species serve as vectors for the disease and have subsequently spread the pathogen to other parts of the world. An example is the fathead minnow (Pimephales promelas) which is responsible for the spread of redmouth disease to trout in Europe. Other vectors include the goldfish (Carassius auratus), Atlantic and Pacific salmon (Salmo salar), the emerald shiner (Notropis atherinoides), and farmed whitefish (Coregonus spp.). Infections have also occurred in farmed turbot (Scophthalmus maximus), seabass (Dicentrarchus labrax), and seabream (Sparus auratus). It can now be found in North and South America, Africa, Asia, and Australia, as well as Europe.

== Clinical signs and diagnosis ==
Infection can cause subcutaneous haemorrhage that presents as reddening of the throat, mouth, gill tips, and fins, and eventual erosion of the jaw and palate. Hemorrhaging also occurs on internal organs, and in the later stages of the disease, the abdomen becomes filled with a yellow fluid - giving the fish a "pot-bellied" appearance. The fish often demonstrate abnormal behavior and anorexia. Mortality rates can be high.

A presumptive diagnosis can be made based in the history and clinical signs, but definitive diagnosis requires bacterial culture and serological testing such as ELISA and latex agglutination.

== Treatment and control ==
Several antibiotics are available for the treatment of redmouth disease in fish. Vaccines can also be used in the treatment and prevention of disease. Management factors such as maintaining water quality and a low stocking density are essential for disease prevention.
