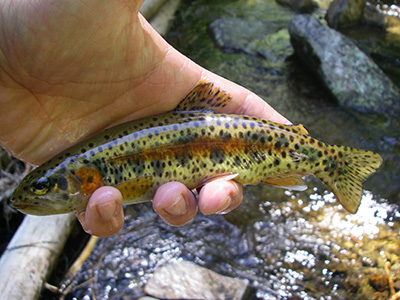

Scientific classification
- Kingdom: Animalia
- Phylum: Chordata
- Class: Actinopterygii
- Division: Teleostei
- Order: Salmoniformes
- Family: Salmonidae
- Genus: Oncorhynchus
- Species: O. mykiss
- Subspecies: O. m. calisulat

Trinomial name
- Oncorhynchus mykiss calisulat (Jordan, 1894)

= McCloud River redband trout =

Subspecies of rainbow trout

The McCloud River redband trout (Oncorhynchus mykiss calisulat), is a redband trout subspecies of rainbow trout in the family Salmonidae. O. m. calisulat is found only in the upper McCloud River, above the Middle Falls. The McCloud River redband trout was recently split from the Oncorhynchus mykiss calisulat subspecies after genetic research by Matthew A. Campbell. Remaining populations of genetically pure McCloud River redband trout are threatened by predation, habitat loss, competition with introduced trout species and by hybridization with hatchery rainbow trout introduced to support sport fishing.

== Description ==
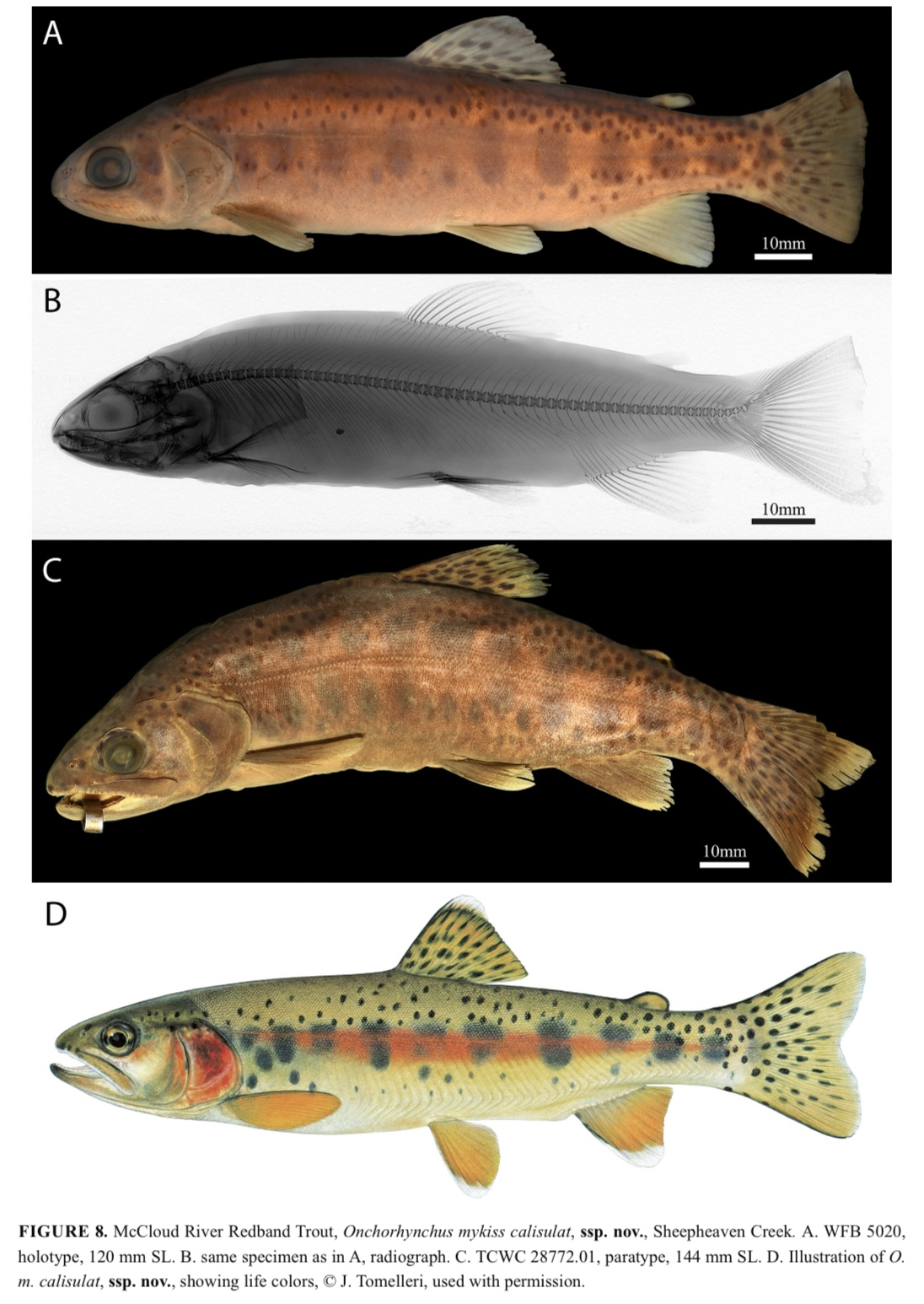
McCloud River Redband Trout, Onchorhynchus mykiss calisulat, ssp. nov., Sheepheaven Creek. A. WFB 5020, holotype, 120 mm SL. B. same specimen as in A, radiograph. C. TCWC 28772.01, paratype, 144 mm SL. D. Illustration of O. m. calisulat, ssp. nov., showing life colors, © J. Tomelleri, used with permission.

Oncorhynchus mykiss calisulat has a fusiform body shape, like other salmonids. They have the typical fins: two pelvic, two pectoral, dorsal, anal, and caudal, with the caudal fin typically being forked. The pelvic, dorsal, and anal fins usually have a noticeable white, yellow, or orange tip. Salmonids (including O. m. calisulat) also have a seventh fin, the adipose fin, found behind the dorsal fin. One feature that distinguishes McCloud River redband trout from other trout is the presence of a “brick-red lateral stripe”. Adults are a yellow color with black spots that tend to be clustered above the lateral line.

Length and weight depend on habitat. In smaller streams, these trout are between 6 and 12 inches from tip of the nose to tip of the tail and weigh between 2 and 12 ounces. In large streams or rivers they typically are between 12 and 20 inches nose to tail and weigh 2 to 3 pounds.

Specimens collected in the lower McCloud River have an average of 63 vertebrae, 20 gill rakers, 32 scales above the lateral line, 146 lateral series scales, and 12 branchiostegal rays (gill supporting bones) on either side of the head.

Specimens from Sheepheaven creek have an average of 61 vertebrae, 15 gillrakers (lowest amount of gillrakers in Pacific trout, thought to be an ancestral trait), 162 lateral series scales, 9 branchiostegal rays on either side, and 36 pyloric caeca. Some specimens also had basibranchial teeth.

Trout found in the isolated Sheepheaven creek have a background olive color dorsally, fading into and a light yellow color ventrally. The brick colored lateral stripe is present along both sides. They also have blue-gray parr markings on their sides. The smaller spots on their sides, back, and caudal fins are black and cover between 3 and 5 scales, with most of the spots being found above the lateral line. The tips of dorsal, adipose, and caudal fins are white, while the tips of pectoral, pelvic, and anal fins are orange. The operculum is dark orange and there is a light yellow cutthroat mark.

== Distribution ==
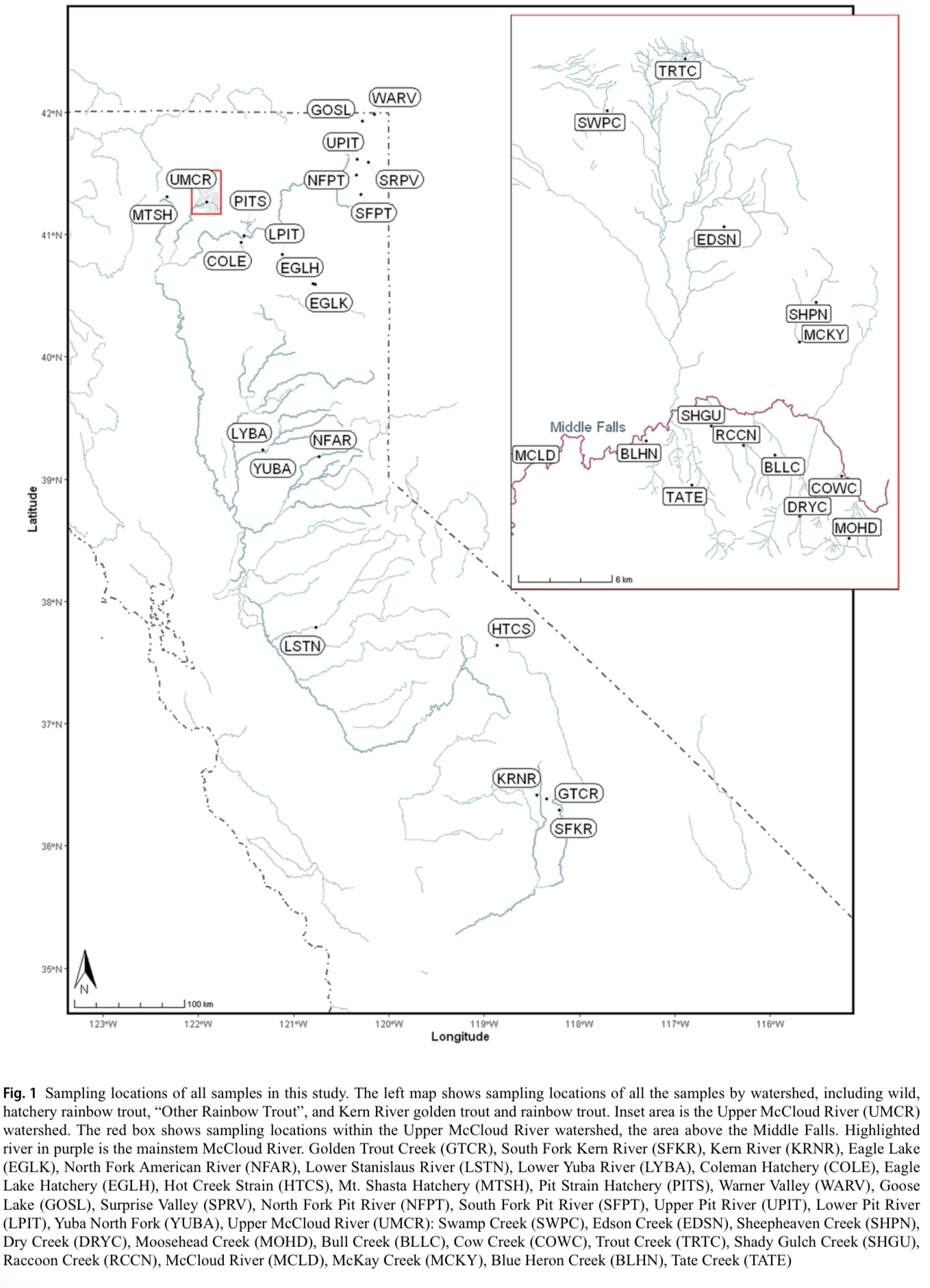
Sampling locations from Habibi et al. 2022. Demonstrates Upper McCloud River watershed (red box).

The geographic location of O. m. calisulat is isolated to the McCloud River. The Upper McCloud River (characterized as being upstream from the impassable McCloud falls) tributaries (Sheepheaven, Moosehead, Edson and Dry Creek) are thought to contain these fish in their least introgressed, most primitive forms. Disconnectivity of the Upper McCloud and Lower McCloud via the McCloud Falls arose from volcanic activity during the Pleistocene, isolating O. m. calisulat from the Sacramento drainage basin and the ocean. Many of the northern tributaries of the McCloud River also flow underground for dry parts of the year, cutting off some streams from the main river and isolating fish populations.

The McCloud River watershed used to be connected to the Sacramento River drainage basin, allowing for anadromous migrations. About 80 years ago the Shasta Dam was built, isolating the McCloud River watershed from the ocean. Additionally, the existence of McCloud falls, which are impassable to fish, isolates the Upper McCloud River from the Lower McCloud River and Shasta Lake.

== Life history ==
Oncorhynchus mykiss calisulat typically live 3 to 4 years, with some living up to 7 years. They spend all of it in freshwater streams and rivers.

The primary diet O. m. calisulat is aquatic and terrestrial invertebrates. Diet may vary seasonally, as demonstrated in Kawaguchi et al., with related species O. mykiss. In spring months, trout feed mostly on benthic invertebrates. In summer and fall months, they feed on aquatic and terrestrial invertebrates (including adult insects in the summer). In winter, fish feed only on aquatic invertebrates. Low rates of gastric evacuation also occur in winter months, likely due to lower temperatures and more consumption of hard to digest invertebrates.

They grow slowly and mature at a young age (around 2 years). Water temperature greatly affects the growth rate and life-span of salmonids. In O. mykiss, rising water temperatures due to climate change affects fish by reducing size and reducing age at maturity, according to the model in Benjamin et al.. (2013). However, increased food availability seems to counter the effects of warmer water.

Additionally, glutamine has been indicated to be an important amino acid for fish during growth periods and periods of stress. When aquaculture O. mykiss were supplemented with glutamine body weight increased at a faster rate than without glutamine supplementation. Diet composition of O. m. calisulat likely affects growth rates and overall body size. Glutamine also increased monounsaturated fatty acids levels. Fatty acids are one of the nutrients required when female trout are going through sexual maturation. They can also help provide energy to germ cells, which aids in successful reproduction.

In salmonids, reproduction takes place in cold, moving water. Eggs are laid in redds (“nests” in the stream substrate) and are fertilized outside of the body. Salmonids have a higher yolk ratio in their eggs and tend to lay less eggs compared to other fish (1,000 eggs for every kilogram of body weight). This yolk, however, allows salmonids to grow large in the first month after hatching, as they retain it and reabsorb it for supplemental nutrition.

Oncorhynchus mykiss calisulat likely has predators consisting of other fish. The related species O. mykiss is stocked in locations throughout the world, including in Alabama, where they are prey to Striped Bass, Largemouth Bass, and Chain Pickerel.

== Historic influence on hatchery rainbow trout ==
In 1877, the second California rainbow trout hatchery and the first federal fish hatchery in the National Fish Hatchery System, was established on Campbell Creek, a McCloud River tributary. This hatchery, the Baird Station, indiscriminately mixed coastal rainbow trout (O. m. irideus) eggs with the eggs of local McCloud River redband trout O. m. calisulat. Eggs from the McCloud hatchery were also provided to the San Leandro hatchery, thus making the origin and genetic history of hatchery-bred rainbow trout somewhat diverse and complex. Rainbow trout eggs and fry from these two hatcheries were the original source of most artificially propagated rainbow trout in the world.

In Missouri, rainbow trout with Baird Station origins were released during the late 1800s. Researchers believe that much of the naturalized rainbow trout in Missouri have McCloud River redband trout genetics. Genetic analysis for trout in Crane Creek (Missouri) point to them potentially being descendents of O. m. calisulat.

== Taxonomy and polyphyly of Oncorhynchus mykiss calisulat ==
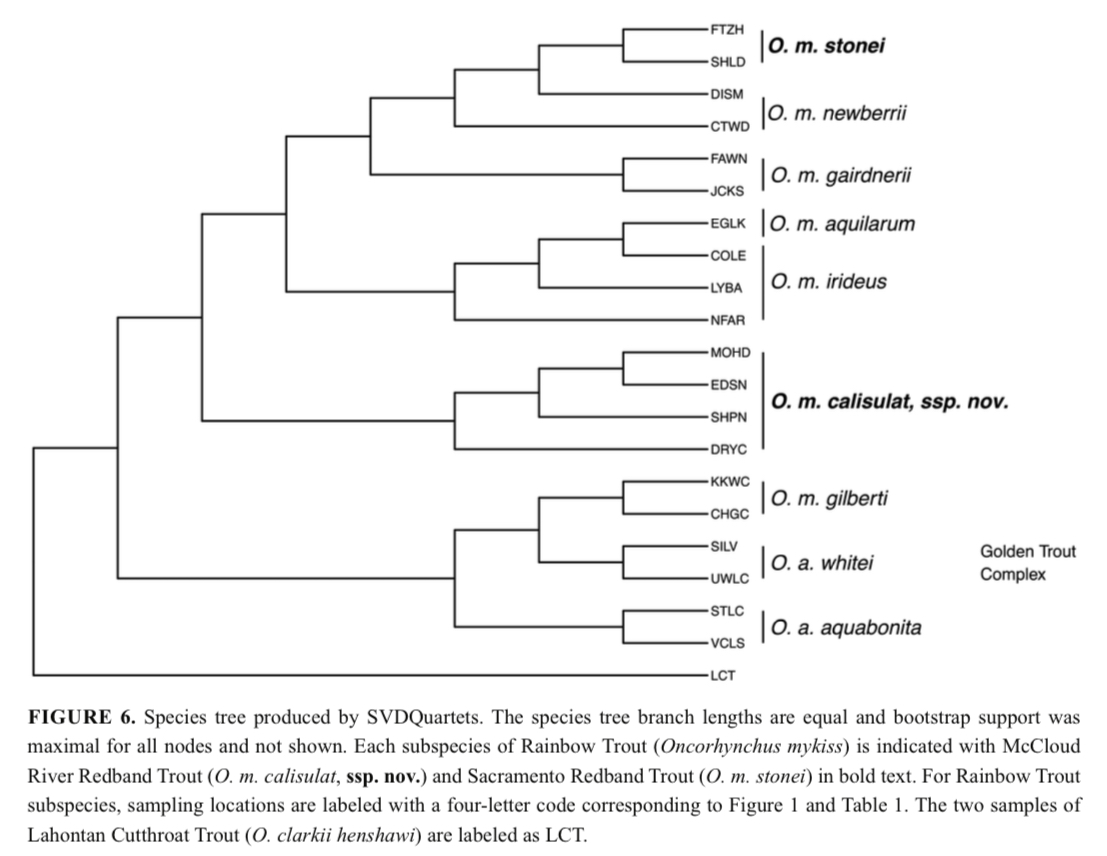
Species tree from Campbell et al. (2023) demonstrating potential relationships between Oncorhynchus mykiss subspecies

The relationship amongst Oncorhynchus species in California is not thoroughly understood. Genetic comparisons show that O. mykiss calisulat has close associations Little Kern River Golden trout (O. aguabonita whitei). The Lahontan Cutthroat Trout (Oncorhynchus clarkii henshaw) is often used as an outgroup to root phylogenetic trees for Onchorhynchus. The potential polyphyly of O. m. stonei was recognized by Behnke (1979, pg. 134) from anatomical characteristics "...stonei would be useful only as name for the trout of a particular geographical region (upper Sacramento River Basin), not as a natural evolutionary unit. I believe the great variability I found is the result of mixing of more than one ancestral form of redband trout, and with a coastal rainbow trout influence in some populations." Analyses of genomic sequence data has demonstrated that redband trout of the upper McCloud River watershed in Swamp, Edson, Sheepheaven, Dry, and Moosehead creeks are a primitive ancestral form of McCloud River redband trout. The redband trout of the Pit River are of Great Basin origin (Oncorhynchus mykiss newberii). McCloud River redband trout have been found to likely be a separate subspecies, constituting a new taxon, Oncorhynchus mykiss calisulat, as detailed in Campbell et al. 2023.

== Conservation status and management of Oncorhynchus mykiss calisulat ==
In 1994, the McCloud River redband trout was identified as a candidate species for official listing under the Endangered Species Act. Since then, conservation agreements and restoration efforts (such as no longer stocking hatchery rainbow trout and reducing human impact on habitat) have been made, resulting in the species not being listed as federally Threatened or Endangered. However, this species is listed as a “Species of Special Concern” in California, and the California Department of Fish and Wildlife and U.S. Forest Service still monitor populations and habitats.

Main issues facing McCloud River redband trout are the threat of introgression, habitat disturbances, and climate change. The introduction of hatchery and non-native trout (brown trout, brook trout) in the McCloud River watershed poses a threat of hybridizing with and displacing O. m. calisulat. Hybridization can lead to reduced fitness and survival in populations, as well as the loss of identifying characteristics in the native species.

Additionally, human activity has affected the McCloud River redband trout via impacts on the McCloud River, primarily through logging and grazing. Grazing “eliminated streamside vegetation, created shallower and wider streams with warmer temperatures, and reduced water quality” and logging “degraded stream habitat through removal of shade canopy, further increasing in water temperatures, sedimentation, and peak storm flows, while lowering fish habitat diversity.” Drought conditions have also posed a threat to populations, prompting conservation managers to translocate fish from isolated creeks and pools that have the potential to dry up. Additionally, fish from the Edson, Swamp, and Moosehead creek populations have been put in the Mount Shasta hatchery to ensure population persistence. Another threat to McCloud River redband trout is competition, predation, and new diseases from introduced species.

According to Currens, Schreck, and Li (2009), intervention will be required to keep genetic distribution and diversity of all subspecies of redband trout. Results from their study suggest that stream, lake, and watershed connectivity restoration will help redband trout populations persist.
