= Yersinia ruckeri =

Scientific classification
- Domain: Bacteria
- Kingdom: Pseudomonadati
- Phylum: Pseudomonadota
- Class: Gammaproteobacteria
- Order: Enterobacterales
- Family: Yersiniaceae
- Genus: Yersinia
- Species: Y. ruckeri

Binomial name
- Yersinia ruckeri Ewing et al. 1978

Species of bacterium

Yersinia ruckeri is a species of Gram-negative bacteria, known for causing enteric redmouth disease in some species of fish. Strain 2396-61 (= ATCC 29473) is its type strain.

A draft genome for Yersinia ruckeri has been published.

Traditional biochemical methods are ineffective at identifying Yersinia ruckeri. Biochemical assays often misidentify Y. ruckeri as Hafnia alvei.
