= Trout =

Freshwater fish from subfamily Salmoninae

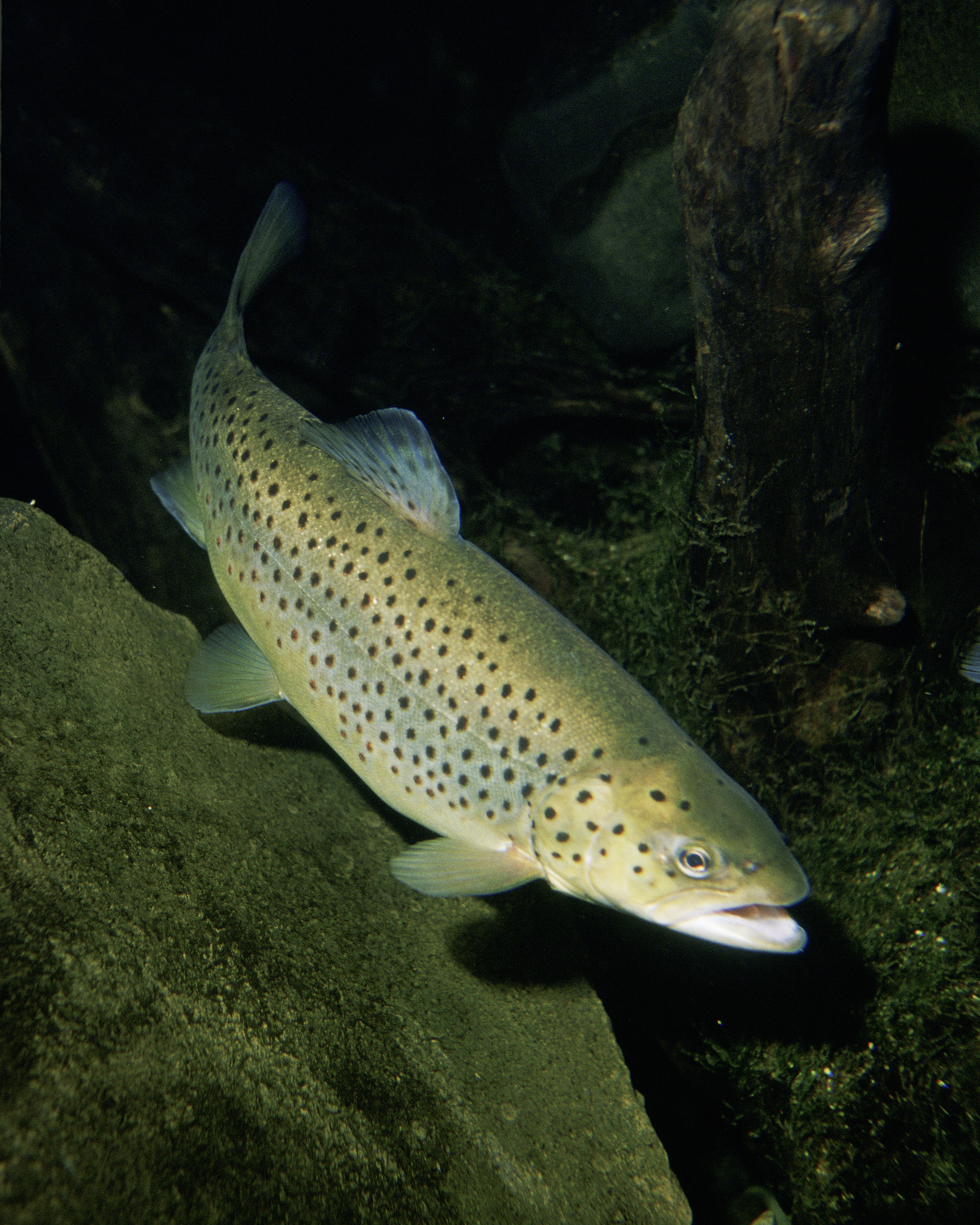
Brown trout

Trout (pl.: trout) is a generic common name for numerous species of carnivorous freshwater fishes belonging to the genera Oncorhynchus, Salmo, and Salvelinus, all of which are members of the subfamily Salmoninae in the family Salmonidae. The word trout is also used for some similar-shaped but non-salmonid fish, such as the spotted seatrout/speckled trout (Cynoscion nebulosus, which is actually a croaker).

Trout are closely related to salmon and have similar migratory life cycles. Most trout are strictly potamodromous, spending their entire lives exclusively in freshwater lakes, rivers and wetlands and migrating upstream to spawn in the shallow gravel beds of smaller headwater creeks. The hatched fry and juvenile trout, known as alevin and parr, will stay upstream growing for years before migrating down to larger waterbodies as maturing adults. There are some anadromous species of trout, such as the steelhead (a coastal subspecies of rainbow trout) and sea trout (the sea-run subspecies of brown trout), that can spend up to three years of their adult lives at sea before returning to freshwater streams for spawning, in the same fashion as a salmon run. Brook trout and three other extant species of North American trout, despite the names, are actually char (or charr), which are salmonids also closely related to trout and salmon.

Trout are classified as oily fish and have been important food fish for humans. As mid-level predators, trout prey upon smaller aquatic animals including crustaceans, insects, worms, baitfish and tadpoles, and themselves in turn are also important staple prey items for many animals, including brown bears, otters, raccoons, birds of prey (e.g. sea eagles, ospreys, fish owls), gulls, cormorants and kingfishers, and other large aquatic predators. Discarded remains of trout also provide a source of nutrients for scavengers, detrivores and riparian florae, making trout keystone species across aquatic and terrestrial ecosystems.

== Species ==
The name "trout" is commonly used for many (if not most) species in three of the seven genera in the subfamily Salmoninae: Salmo (Atlantic), Oncorhynchus (Pacific) and Salvelinus (circum-arctic). Fish species referred to as trout include:

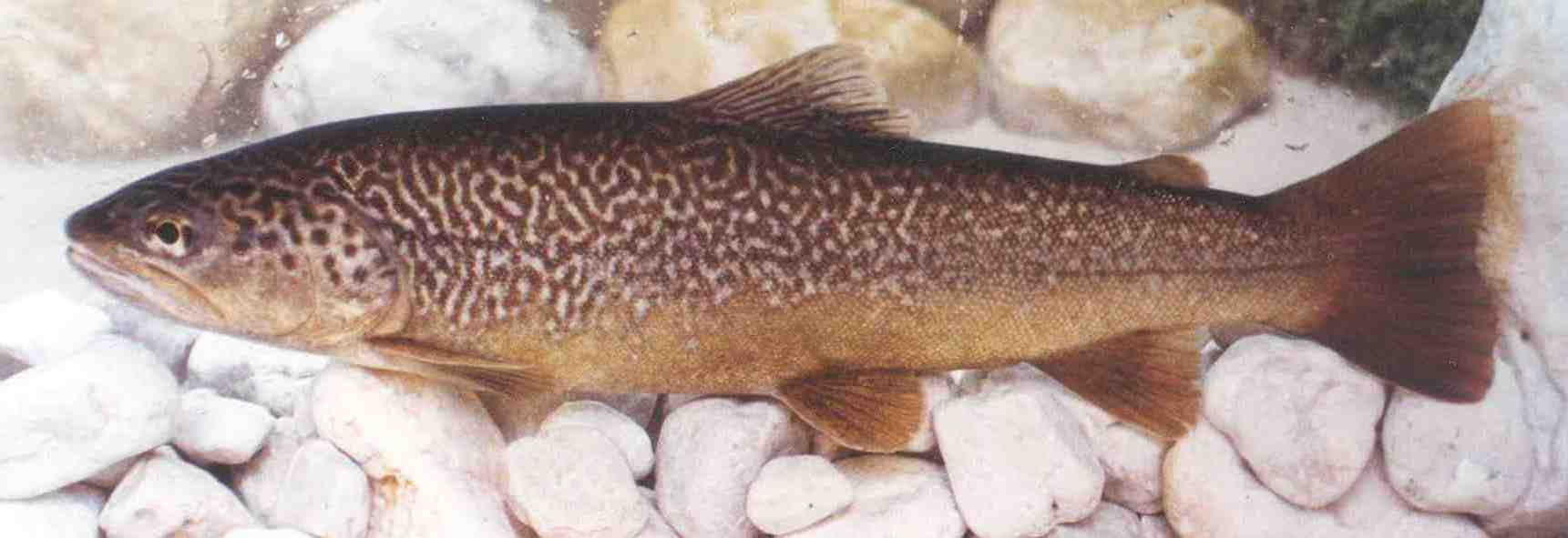
Salmo: marble trout, S. marmoratus

- Genus Salmo, all extant species except Atlantic salmon
  - Adriatic trout, Salmo obtusirostris
  - Brown trout, Salmo trutta
    - River trout, S. t. morpha fario
    - Lake trout/Lacustrine trout, S. t. morpha lacustris
    - Sea trout, S. t. morpha trutta
  - Flathead trout, Salmo platycephalus
  - Marble trout, Soca River trout or Soča trout – Salmo marmoratus
  - Ohrid trout, Salmo letnica, S. balcanicus (extinct), S. lumi, and S. aphelios
  - Sevan trout, Salmo ischchan

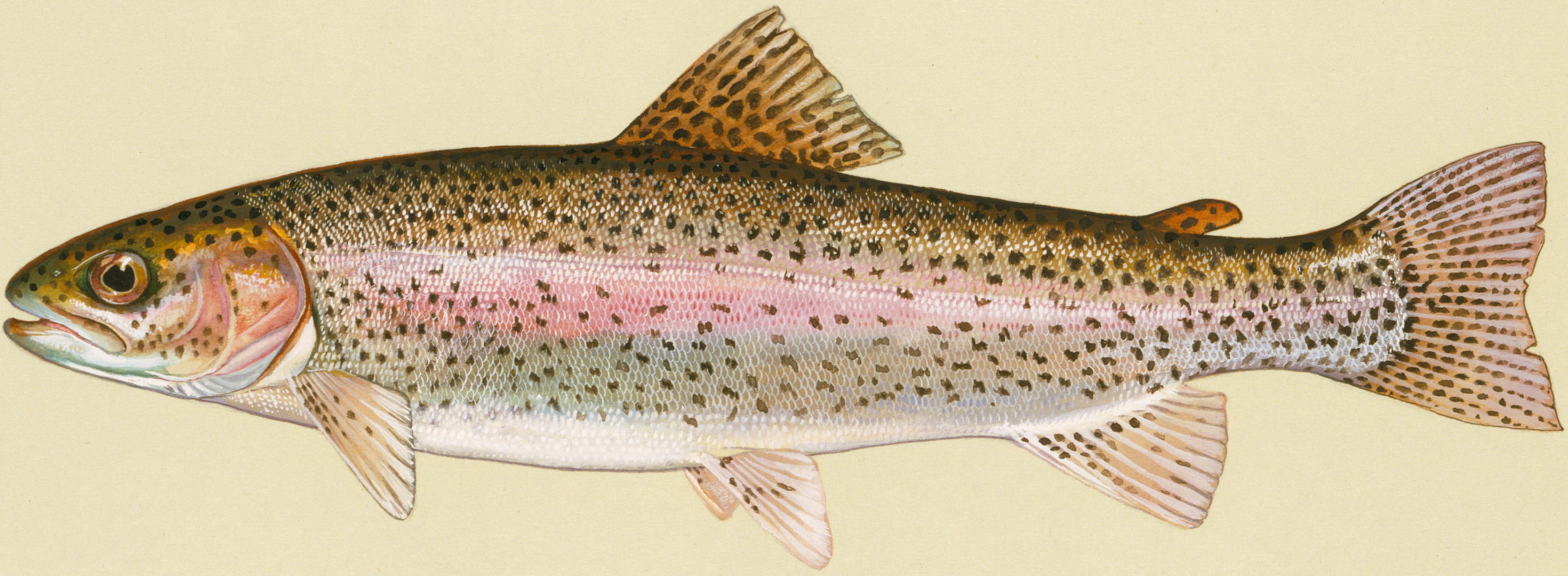
Oncorhynchus: rainbow trout, O. mykiss

- Genus Oncorhynchus, six of the 12 extant species
  - Apache trout, Oncorhynchus apache
  - Biwa trout, Oncorhynchus masou rhodurus
  - Cutthroat trout, Oncorhynchus clarki
    - Coastal cutthroat trout, O. c. clarki
      - Crescenti trout, O. c. c. f. crescenti
    - Alvord cutthroat trout, O. c. alvordensis (extinct)
    - Bonneville cutthroat trout, O. c. utah
    - Humboldt cutthroat trout, O. c. humboldtensis
    - Lahontan cutthroat trout, O. c. henshawi
      - Whitehorse Basin cutthroat trout
    - Paiute cutthroat trout, O. c. seleniris
    - Snake River fine-spotted cutthroat trout, O. c. behnkei
    - Westslope cutthroat trout, O. c. lewisi
    - Yellowfin cutthroat trout, O. c. macdonaldi (extinct)
    - Yellowstone cutthroat trout, O. c. bouvieri
    - Colorado River cutthroat trout, O. c. pleuriticus
    - Greenback cutthroat trout, O. c. stomias
    - Rio Grande cutthroat trout, O. c. virginalis
  - Gila trout, Oncorhynchus gilae
  - Rainbow trout, Oncorhynchus mykiss
    - Kamchatkan rainbow trout, Oncorhynchus mykiss mykiss
    - Columbia River redband trout, Oncorhynchus mykiss gairdneri
    - Coastal rainbow trout (steelhead), Oncorhynchus mykiss irideus
      - Beardslee trout, Oncorhynchus mykiss irideus var. beardsleei
    - Great Basin redband trout, Oncorhynchus mykiss newberrii
    - Golden trout, Oncorhynchus mykiss aguabonita
      - Kern River rainbow trout, Oncorhynchus mykiss aguabonita var. gilberti
      - Sacramento golden trout, Oncorhynchus mykiss aguabonita var. stonei
      - Little Kern golden trout, Oncorhynchus mykiss aguabonita var. whitei
    - Kamloops rainbow trout, Oncorhynchus mykiss kamloops
    - Baja California rainbow trout, Nelson's trout, or San Pedro Martir trout, Oncorhynchus mykiss nelsoni
    - Eagle Lake trout, Oncorhynchus mykiss aquilarum
    - McCloud River redband trout, Oncorhynchus mykiss stonei
    - Sheepheaven Creek redband trout
  - Mexican golden trout, Oncorhynchus chrysogaster

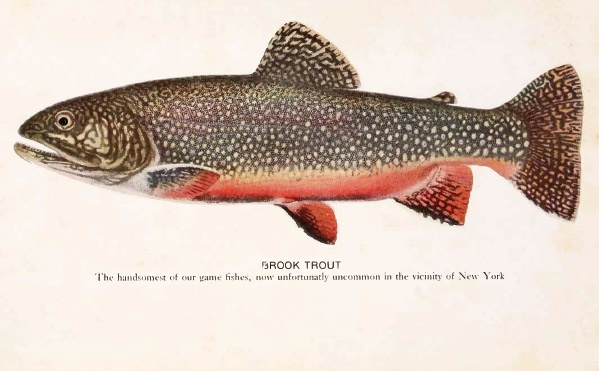
Salvelinus: brook trout, S. fontinalis

- Genus Salvelinus, five of the 52 extant species
  - Brook trout, Salvelinus fontinalis
    - Aurora trout, S. f. timagamiensis
  - Bull trout, Salvelinus confluentus
  - Dolly Varden trout, Salvelinus malma
  - Lake trout, Salvelinus namaycush
  - Silver trout, † Salvelinus agassizi (extinct)
- Hybrids
  - Tiger trout, Salmo trutta X Salvelinus fontinalis (infertile)
  - Speckled Lake (Splake) trout, Salvelinus namaycush X Salvelinus fontinalis (fertile)

=== Fish from other families ===
- Pseudaphritidae
  - Genus Pseudaphritis
    - Sand trout, Pseudaphritis urvillii
- Sciaenidae
  - Genus Cynoscion
    - Spotted sea-trout, Cynoscion nebulosus

== Anatomy ==
Trout that live in different environments can have dramatically different colorations and patterns. Mostly, these colors and patterns form as camouflage, based on the surroundings, and will change as the fish moves to different habitats. Trout in, or newly returned from the sea, can look very silvery, while the same fish living in a small stream or in an alpine lake could have pronounced markings and more vivid coloration; it is also possible that in some species, this signifies that they are ready to mate. In general, trout that are about to breed have extremely intense coloration and can look like an entirely different fish outside of spawning season. It is virtually impossible to define a particular color pattern as belonging to a specific breed; however, in general, wild fish are claimed to have more vivid colors and patterns.

Trout have fins entirely without spines, and all of them have a small adipose fin along the back, near the tail. The pelvic fins sit well back on the body, on each side of the anus. The swim bladder is connected to the esophagus, allowing for gulping or rapid expulsion of air, a condition known as physostome. Unlike many other physostome fish, trout do not use their bladder as an auxiliary device for oxygen uptake, relying solely on their gills.

There are many species, and even more populations, that are isolated from each other and morphologically different. However, since many of these distinct populations show no significant genetic differences, what may appear to be a large number of species is considered a much smaller number of distinct species by most ichthyologists. The trout found in the eastern United States are a good example of this. The brook trout, the aurora trout, and the (extinct) silver trout all have physical characteristics and colorations that distinguish them, yet genetic analysis shows that they are one species, Salvelinus fontinalis.

Lake trout (Salvelinus namaycush), like brook trout, belong to the char genus. Lake trout inhabit many of the larger lakes in North America, and live much longer than rainbow trout, which have an average maximum lifespan of seven years. Lake trout can live many decades, and can grow to more than 30 kilograms (66 lb).

== Habitat ==
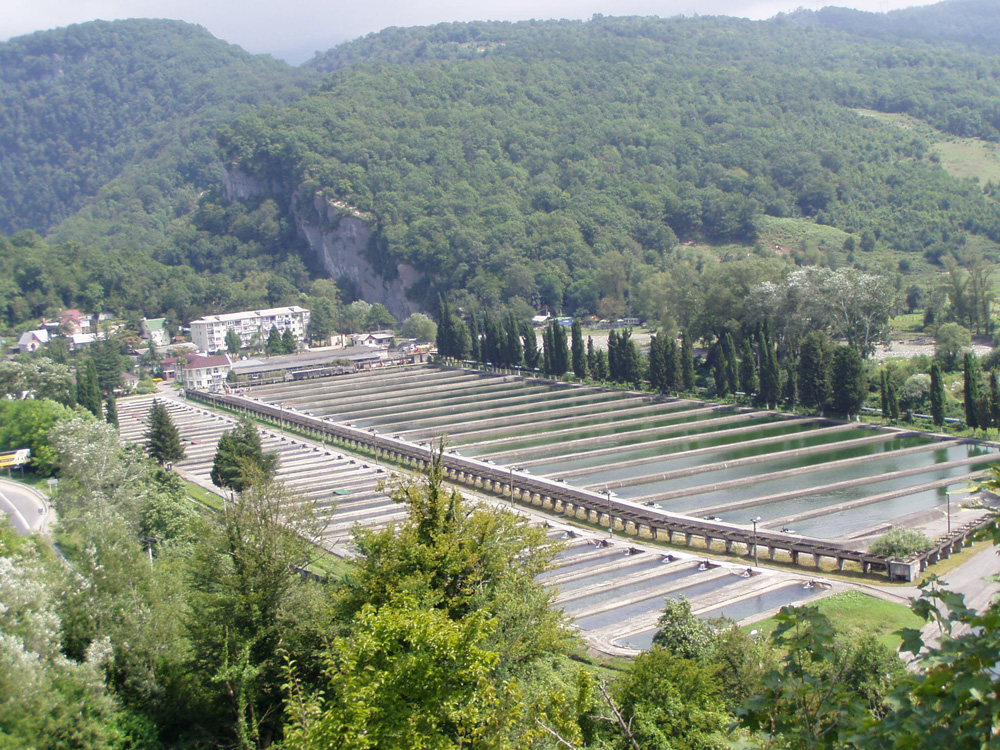
A trout farm in Sochi, Russia

As salmonids, trout are coldwater fish that are usually found in cool (50–60 °F or 10–16 °C), clear streams, wetlands and lakes, although many of the species have anadromous populations as well. Juvenile trout are referred to as troutlet, troutling or parr. They are distributed naturally throughout North America, northern Asia and Europe. Several species of trout were introduced to Australia and New Zealand by amateur fishing enthusiasts in the 19th century, effectively displacing and endangering several upland native fish species. The introduced species included brown trout from England and rainbow trout from California. The rainbow trout has a steelhead subspecies, generally accepted as coming from Sonoma Creek. The rainbow trout of New Zealand still show the steelhead tendency to run up rivers in winter to spawn.

In Australia, the rainbow trout was introduced in 1894 from New Zealand and is an extremely popular gamefish in recreational angling. Despite severely impacting the distribution and abundance of native Australian fish, such as the climbing galaxias, millions of rainbow and other trout species are released annually from government and private hatcheries.

The closest resemblance of seema trout and other trout family can be found in the Himalayan Region of India, Nepal, Bhutan, Pakistan and in Tian Shan mountains of Kyrgyzstan.

== Diet ==
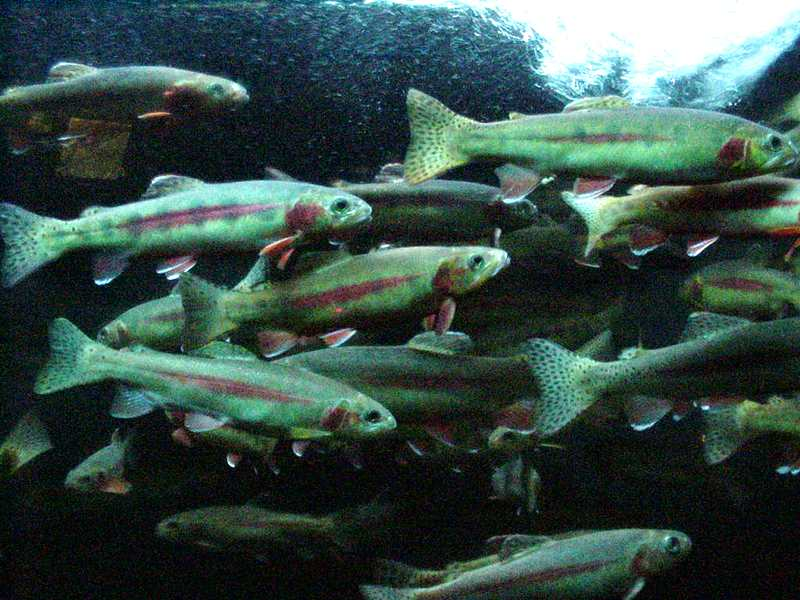
Golden trout, Oncorhynchus aguabonita

Trout generally feed on other fish, and soft-bodied aquatic invertebrates, such as flies, mayflies, caddisflies, stoneflies, mollusks and dragonflies. In lakes, various species of zooplankton often form a large part of the diet. In general, trout longer than about 300 millimetres (12 in) prey almost exclusively on fish, where they are available. Adult trout will devour smaller fish up to one-third of their length. Trout may feed on shrimp, mealworms, bloodworms, insects, small animal parts, and eel.

Trout who swim the streams love to feed on land animals, aquatic life, and flies. Most of their diet comes from macroinvertebrates, or animals that do not have a backbone like snails, worms, or insects. They also eat flies, and most people who try to use lures to fish trout mimic flies because they are one of trout's most fed on meals. Trout enjoy certain land animals, including insects like grasshoppers. They also eat small animals like mice when they fall in. (Although only large trout have mouths capable of eating mice.) They consume a diet of aquatic life like minnows or crawfish as well. Trout have a diverse diet they follow; they have plenty of different options.

== Trout as food ==
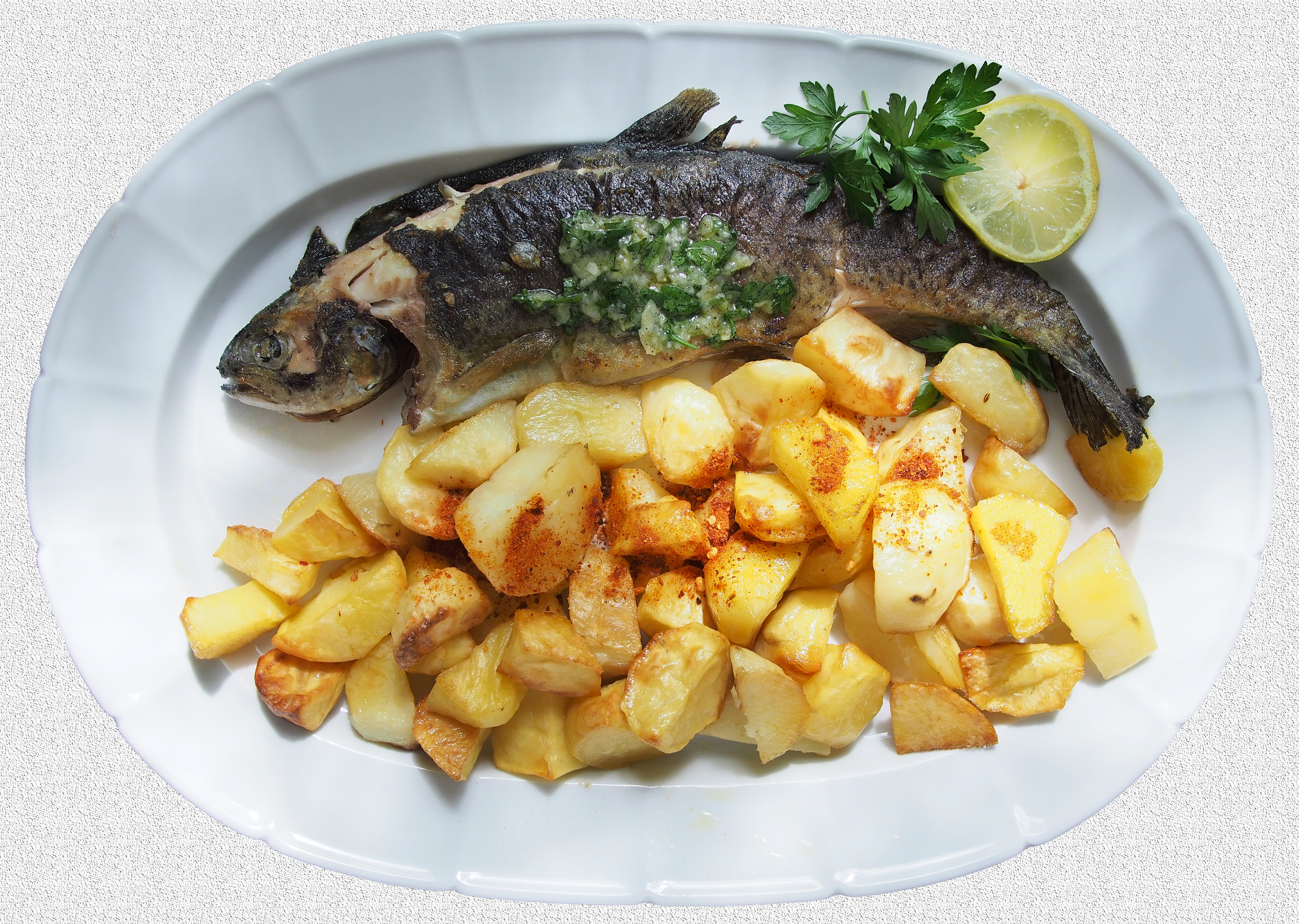
Baked trout

Compared to other salmonids, trout are somewhat more bony, but the flesh is generally considered delicious, and the texture is often indistinguishable from that of salmon. The flavor of the flesh is heavily influenced by the diet of the fish. For example, trout that have been feeding on crustaceans tend to be more flavorful than those feeding primarily on insects and larvae. Because of their popularity, trout are often raised on fish farms and then stocked into heavily fished waters, in an effort to mask the effects of overfishing. Farmed trout are also sold commercially as seafood, although they are not saltwater fish. Trout meat is typically prepared the same way as salmon, often by smoking.

In Mainland China, farm-raised rainbow trout from Qinghai was officially sanctioned to be labeled and sold domestically as salmon, which caused controversy in 2018 regarding food safety and consumer rights violation, as raw fish dishes or yusheng using Atlantic salmon are gaining popularity in southern China. Farmed rainbow trout is much cheaper than the imported Atlantic salmon and the meat are indistinguishable to the untrained eyes, and the news of trout being sold as salmon triggered public scrutiny accusing seafood suppliers of bait-and-switch and unethical business practices. Also, many people believe freshwater trout are more prone to parasites than oceanic salmon (even though both live in freshwater for significant periods of their life cycles) and thus unsafe for raw eating.

== Trout fishing ==
Trout are very popular freshwater game fish highly prized especially by creek fishermen, because they generally put up a good fight when caught with a hook and line. As trout are predatory fish, lure fishing (which use replica baits called lures to imitate live prey) is the predominant form of sport fishing involving trout, although traditional bait fishing techniques using floats and/or sinkers (particularly with moving live baits such as baitfish, crayfish or aquatic insects) are also successful, especially against stocked trout that are hatchery/farm-raised and thus more accustomed to artificial feeds.

Many species of trout, most noticeably rainbow trout and brown trout, have been widely introduced into waterbodies outside of their native ranges purely for the sake of recreational fishing, and some of these introduced populations have even become invasive in the new habitats.

=== River fishing ===
While trout can be caught with a normal rod and reel, fly fishing is a distinctive lure fishing method developed for trout, and now extended to other species. Due to the high proportion of insects and small crustaceans within the trout's diet, small lures made of hand-tied hairs and threads are often used to imitate these aquatic invertebrates that the trout prey upon. These ultralight fly lures cannot be cast adequately by conventional techniques, and a specialized heavy line (i.e. fly line) is needed to launch the lure.

Understanding how moving water shapes the stream channel makes it easier to find trout. In most streams, the current creates a riffle-run-pool pattern that repeats itself over and over. A deep pool may hold a big brown trout, but rainbow trout and smaller brown trout are likely found in runs. Riffles are where fishers will find small trout, called troutlet, during the day and larger trout crowding in during morning and evening feeding periods.

- Riffles have a fast current and shallow water. This gives way to a bottom of gravel, rubble or boulder. Riffles are morning and evening feeding areas. Trout usually spawn just above or below riffles, but may spawn right in them.
- Runs are deeper than riffles with a moderate current and are found between riffles and pools. The bottom is made up of small gravel or rubble. These hot spots hold trout almost anytime, if there is sufficient cover.
- Pools are smoother and look darker than the other areas of the stream. The deep, slow-moving water generally has a bottom of silt, sand, or small gravel. Pools make good midday resting spots for medium to large trout.
- It is recommended that when fishing for trout, that the fisher(s) should use line in the 4–8 lb test for streamfish, and stronger line with the same diameter for trout from the sea or from a large lake, such as Lake Michigan. It is also recommended to use a hook size 8–5 for trout of all kind. Trout, especially farm-raised ones, tend to like salmon roes, worms, minnows, cut bait, maize, or marshmallows.

=== Ice fishing ===
Fishing for trout under the ice generally occurs in depths of 4 to 8 feet (1.2 to 2.4 m). Because trout are cold water fish, during the winter they move from up-deep to the shallows, replacing the small fish that inhabit the area during the summer. Trout in winter constantly cruise in shallow depths looking for food, usually traveling in groups, although bigger fish may travel alone and in water that's somewhat deeper, around 12 feet (3.7 m). Rainbow, Brown, and Brook trout are the most common trout species caught through the ice.

=== Trout fishing records ===
By information from International Game Fish Association (IGFA), the most outstanding records are:

- Brook trout caught by Dr. W. Cook in the Nipigon River in Ontario (Canada) July 1, 1916, that weighed 6.57 kg (14 lb 8 oz)
- Cutthroat trout caught by John Skimmerhorn in Pyramid Lake (Nevada) (U.S.) December 1, 1925, that weighed 18.59 kg (41 lb 0 oz)
- Bull trout caught by N. Higgins in Lake Pend Oreille in Idaho (U.S.) October 27, 1949, that weighed 14.51 kg (32 lb 0 oz)
- Golden trout caught by Chas Reed in Cooks Lake in Wyoming (U.S.) August 5, 1948, that weighed 4.98 kg (11 lb 0 oz)
- Rainbow trout caught by Sean Konrad in Lake Diefenbaker in Saskatchewan (Canada) September 5, 2009, that weighed 21.77 kg (48 lb 0 oz)
- Lake trout caught by Lloyd Bull in Great Bear Lake in Northwest Territories (Canada) on August 19, 1995, that weighed 32.65 kg (72 lb 0 oz)

=== Baits ===
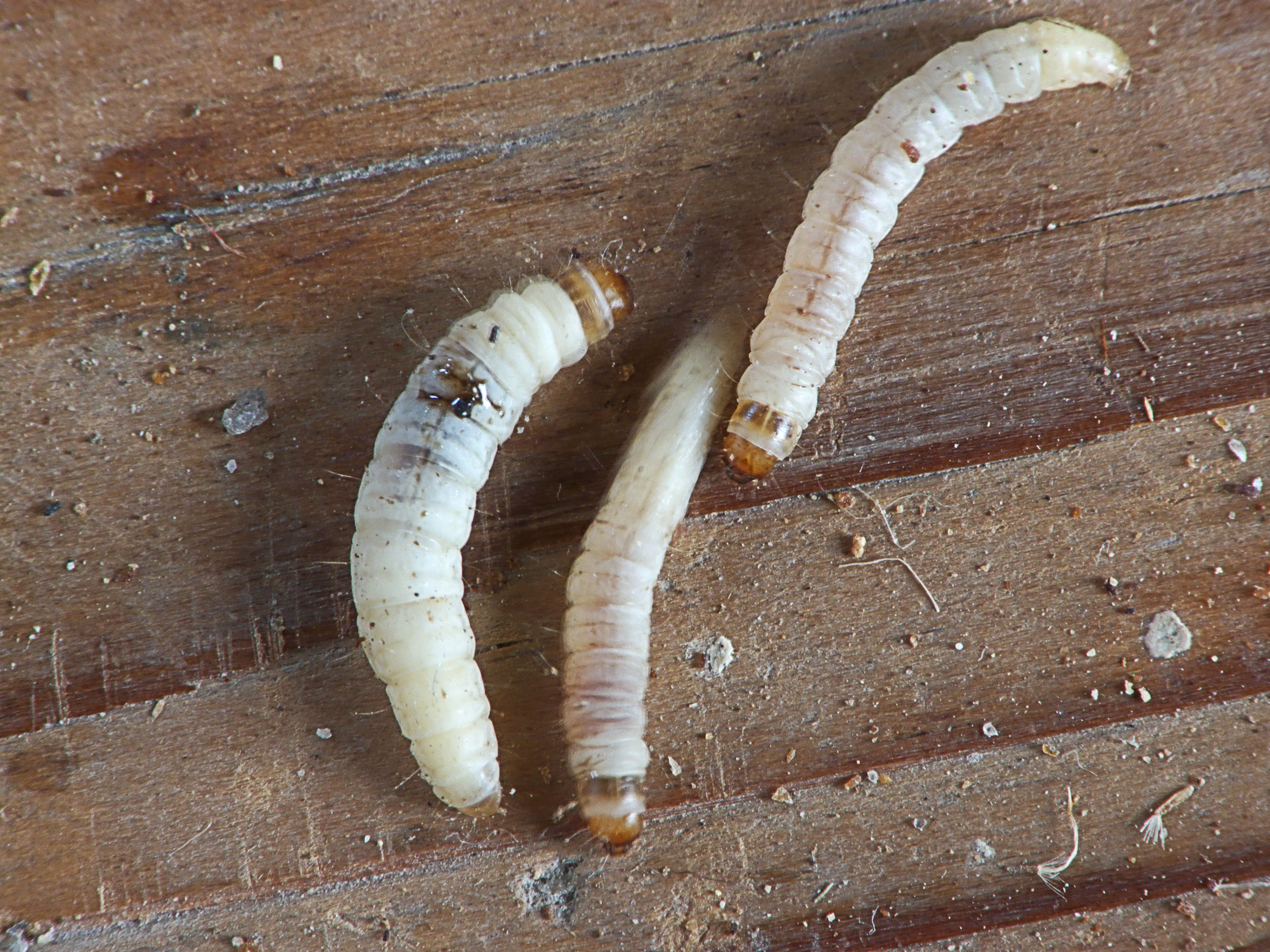
Waxworms are used as live-bait for trout fishing.

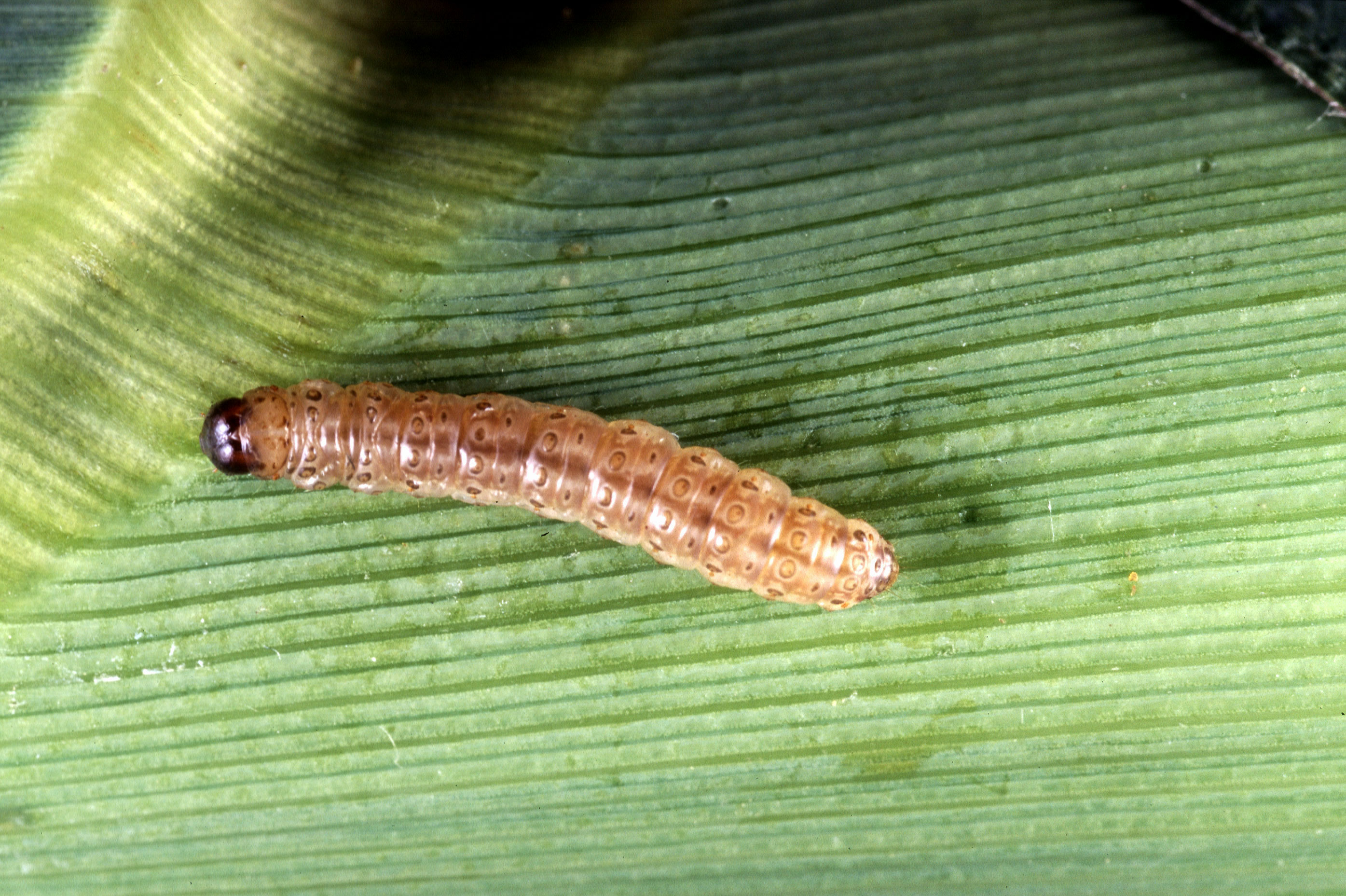
Corn worms are also excellent live-bait when trout fishing.

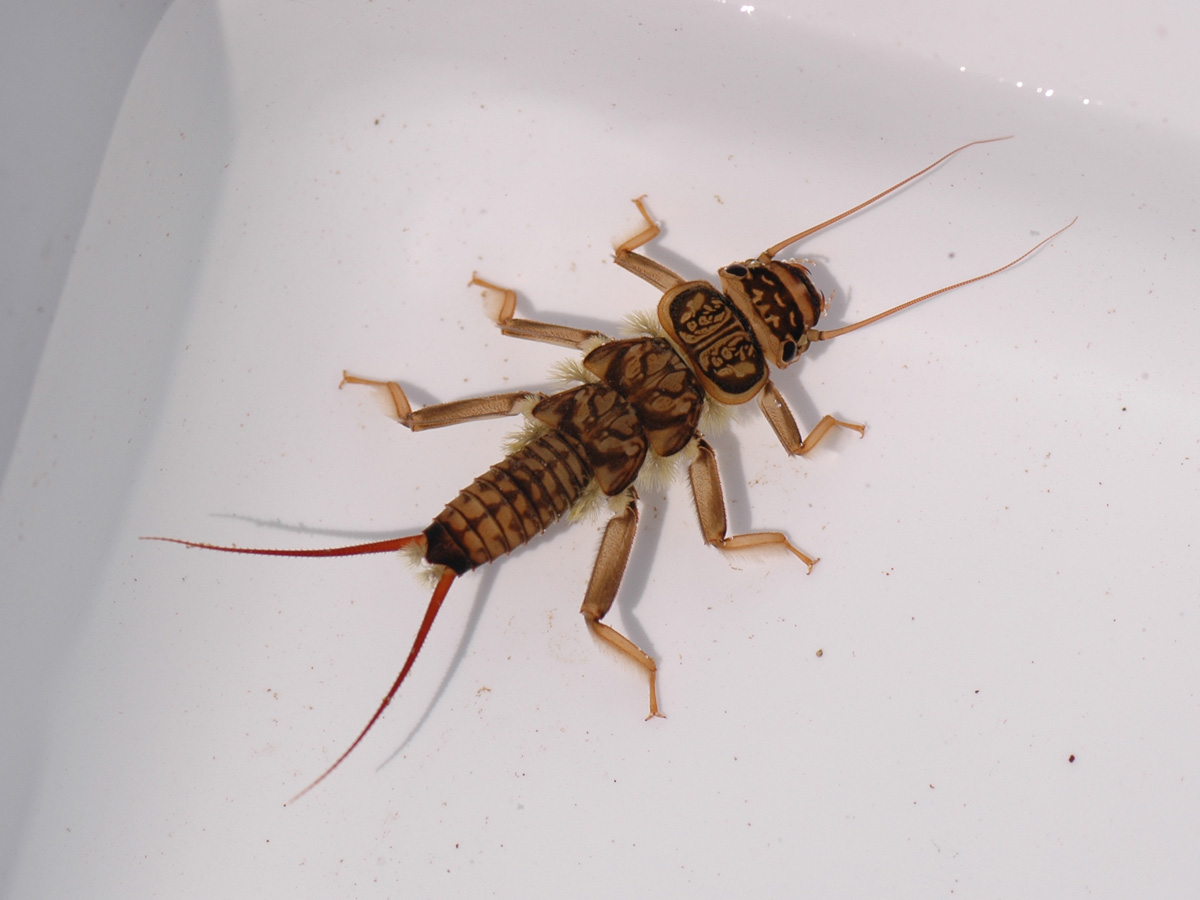
Nymph of a golden stonefly are used as live-bait for trout fishing.

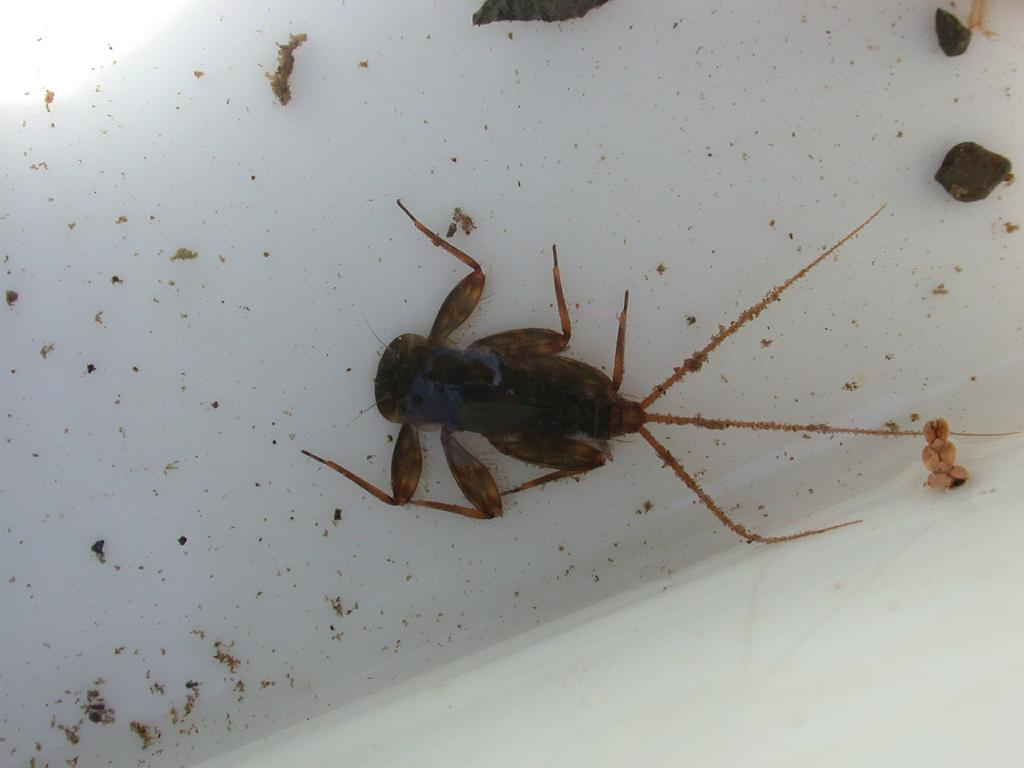
Nymph mayfly

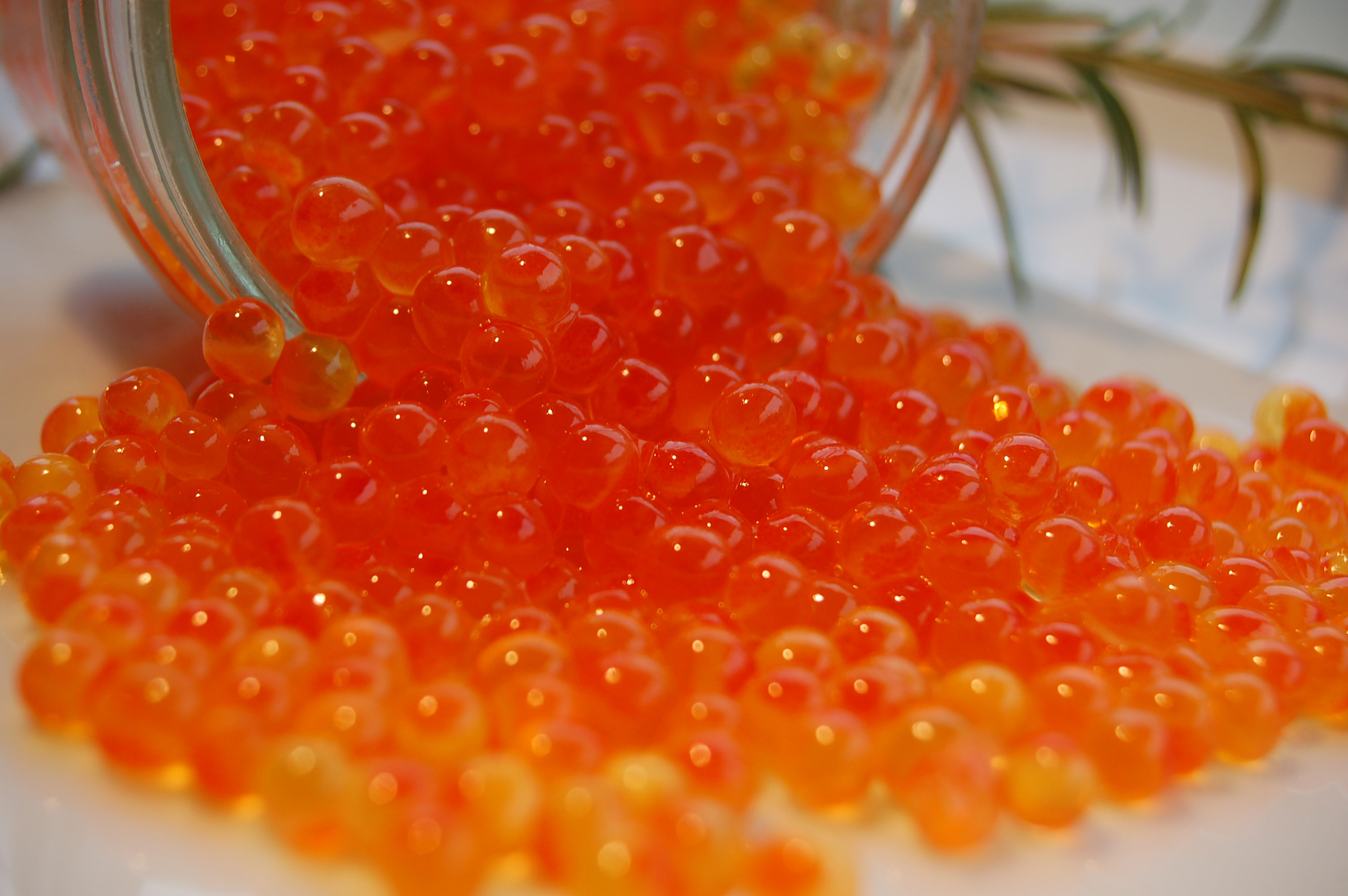
Salmon roe (red caviar)

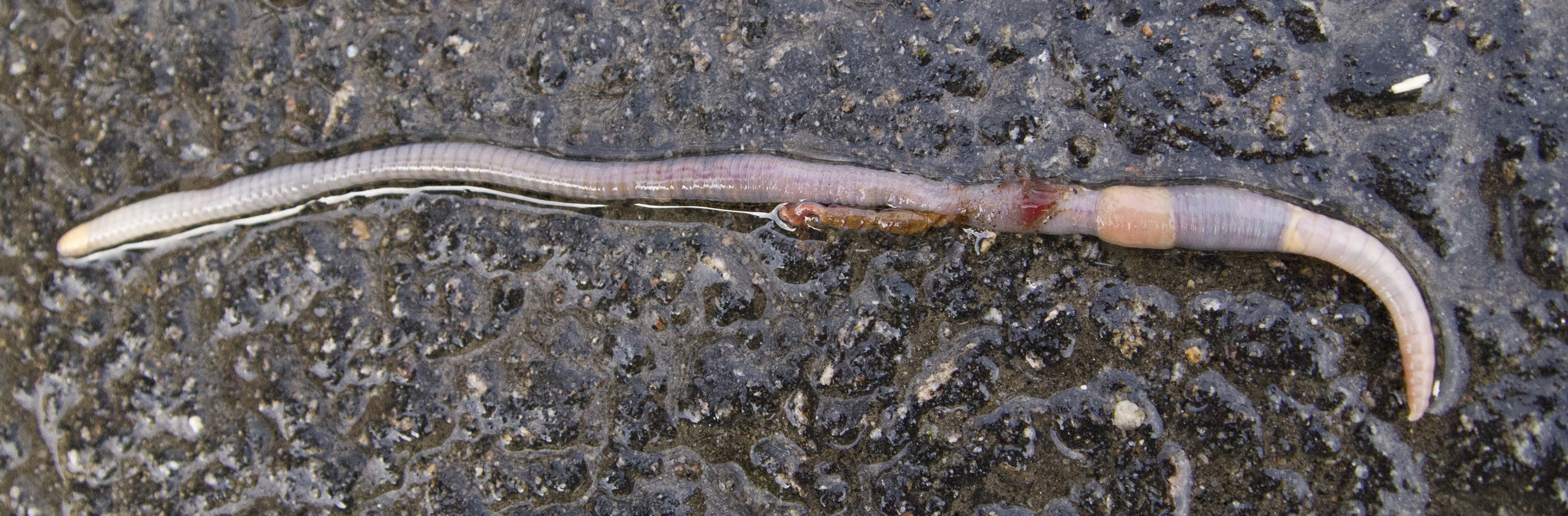
Worms are cheap and effective bait to use for trout and most types of fish.

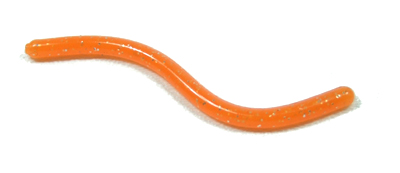
A soft plastic lure or "trout worm"
Fly Fishing Flies

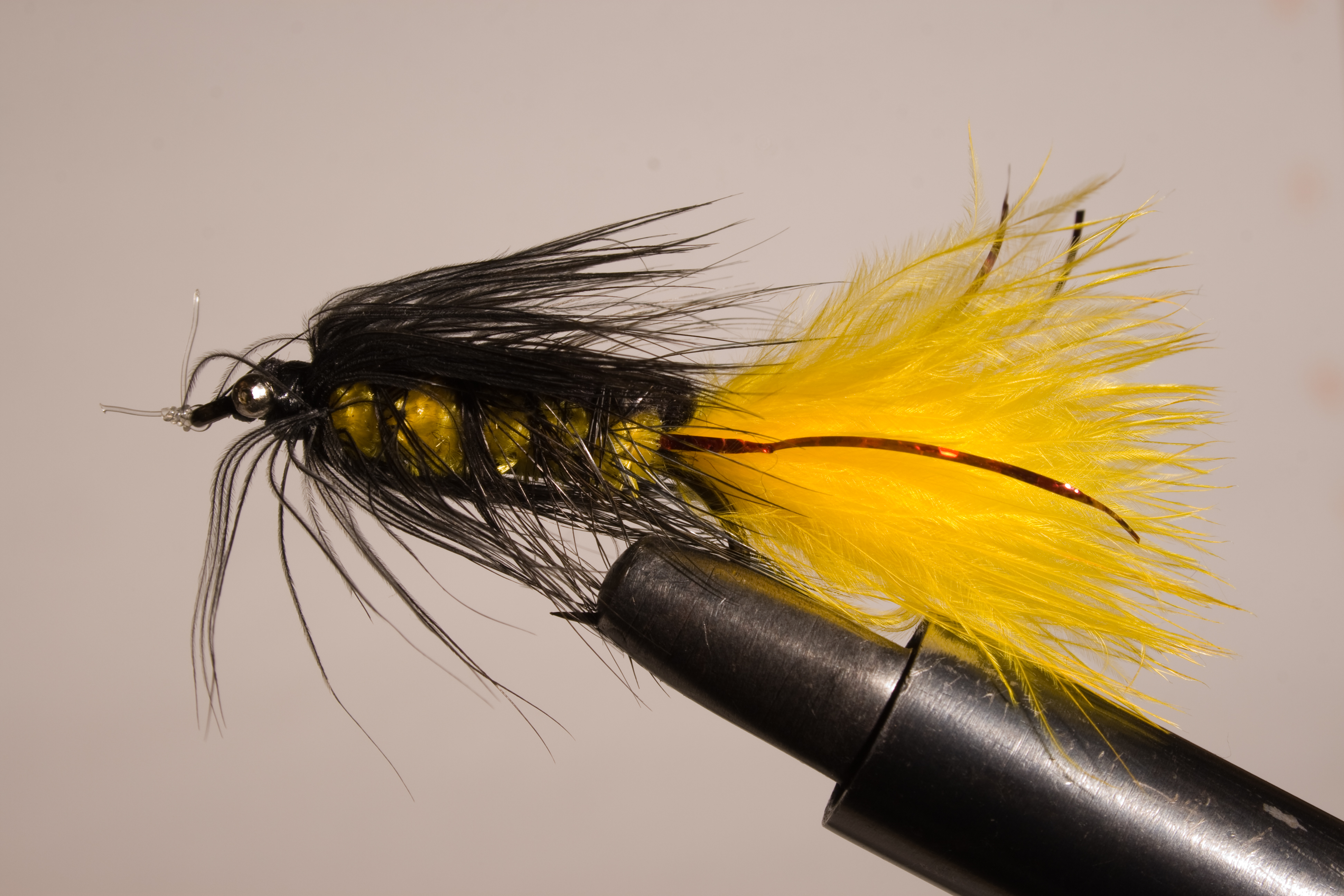
Wooly buggers can be tied in every color imaginable.

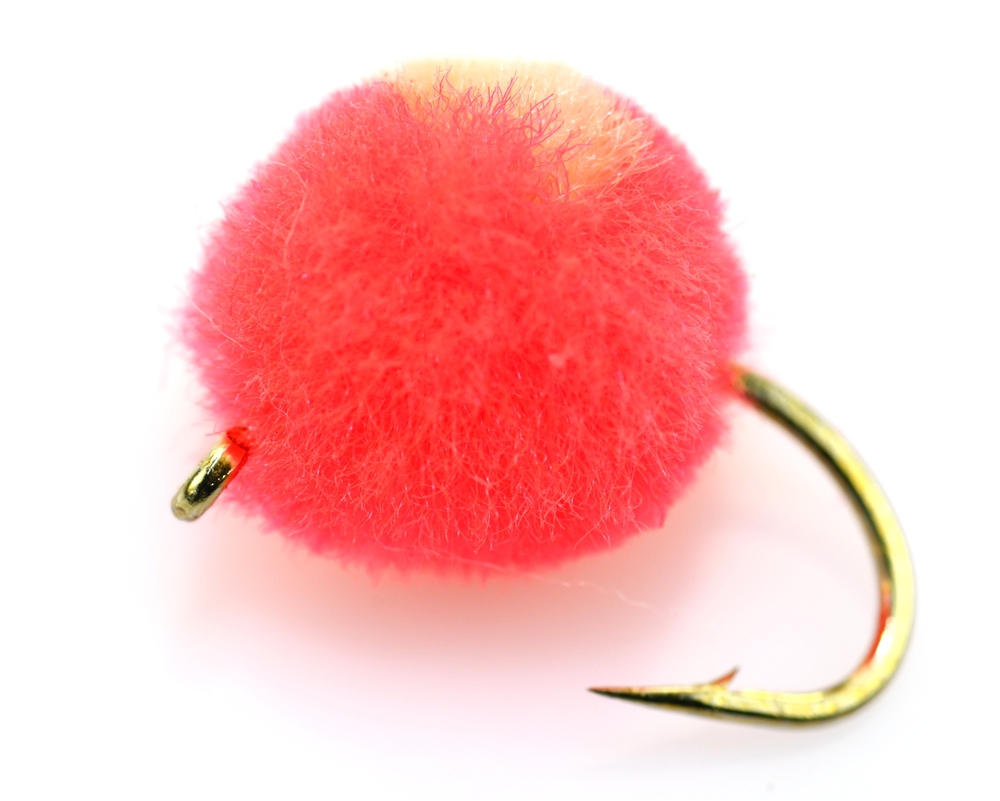
Egg patterns are effective for steelhead and trout in rivers.

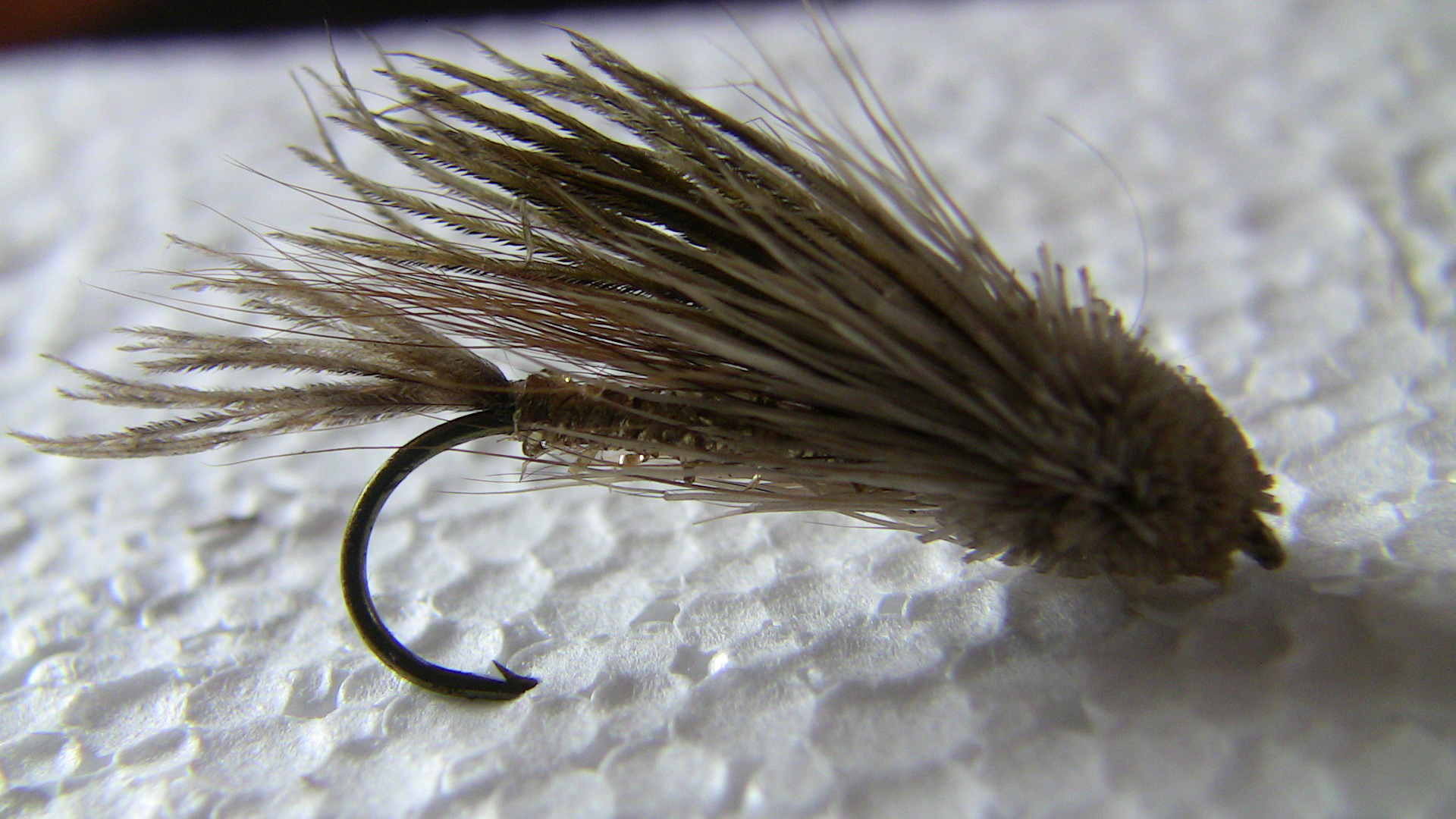
Muddler minnow

== Declines in native trout populations ==
Salmonid populations in general have been declining due to numerous factors, including invasive species, hybridization, wildfires, and climate change. Native salmonid fish in the western and southwestern United States are threatened by non-native species that were introduced decades ago. Non-native salmonids were introduced to enrich recreational fishing; however, they quickly started outcompeting and displacing native salmonids upon their arrival.

Non-native, invasive species are quick to adapt to their new environment and learn to outcompete any native species, making them a force the native salmon and trout have to reckon with. Not only do the non-native fish drive the native fish to occupy new niches, but they also try to hybridize with them, contaminating the native gene construction. As more hybrids between native and non-native fish are formed, the lineage of the pure fish is continuously being contaminated by other species and soon may no longer represent the sole native species. The Rio Grande cutthroat trout (Oncorhynchus clarki virginalis) are susceptible to hybridization with other salmonids such as rainbow trout (Oncorhynchus mykiss) and yield a new "cutbow" trout, which is a contamination of both lineages' genes. One solution to this issue is implemented by New Mexico Department of Game and Fish hatcheries: stock only sterile fish in river streams. Hatcheries serve as a reservoir of fish for recreational activities but growing and stocking non-sterile fish would worsen the hybridization issue on a quicker, more magnified time scale. By stocking sterile fish, the native salmonids can't share genes with the non-native hatchery fish, thus, preventing further gene contamination of the native trout in New Mexico. Fire is also a factor in deteriorating Gila trout (Oncorhynchus gilae) populations because of the ash and soot that can enter streams following fires. The ash lowers water quality, making it more difficult for the Gila trout to survive. In some New Mexico streams, the native Gila trout will be evacuated from streams that are threatened by nearby fires and be reintroduced after the threat is resolved.

Climate change is also dwindling native salmonid populations. Global warming continually affects various cold-water fish such as trout, especially as inland waterbodies are more prone to warming than oceans. With an increase of temperature along with changes in spawning river flow, an abundance of trout species are affected negatively. In the past, a mere 8 °F (4.4 °C) increase was predicted to eliminate half of the native brook trout in the Southern Appalachian Mountains. Trout generally prefer streams with colder water (50–60 °F or 10–16 °C) to spawn and thrive, but raising water temperatures are altering this ecosystem and further deteriorate native populations.

== See also ==
- Introduced trout in lake ecosystems
- List of smoked foods
- Trout tickling
