= Crystal Lake Fish Hatchery =

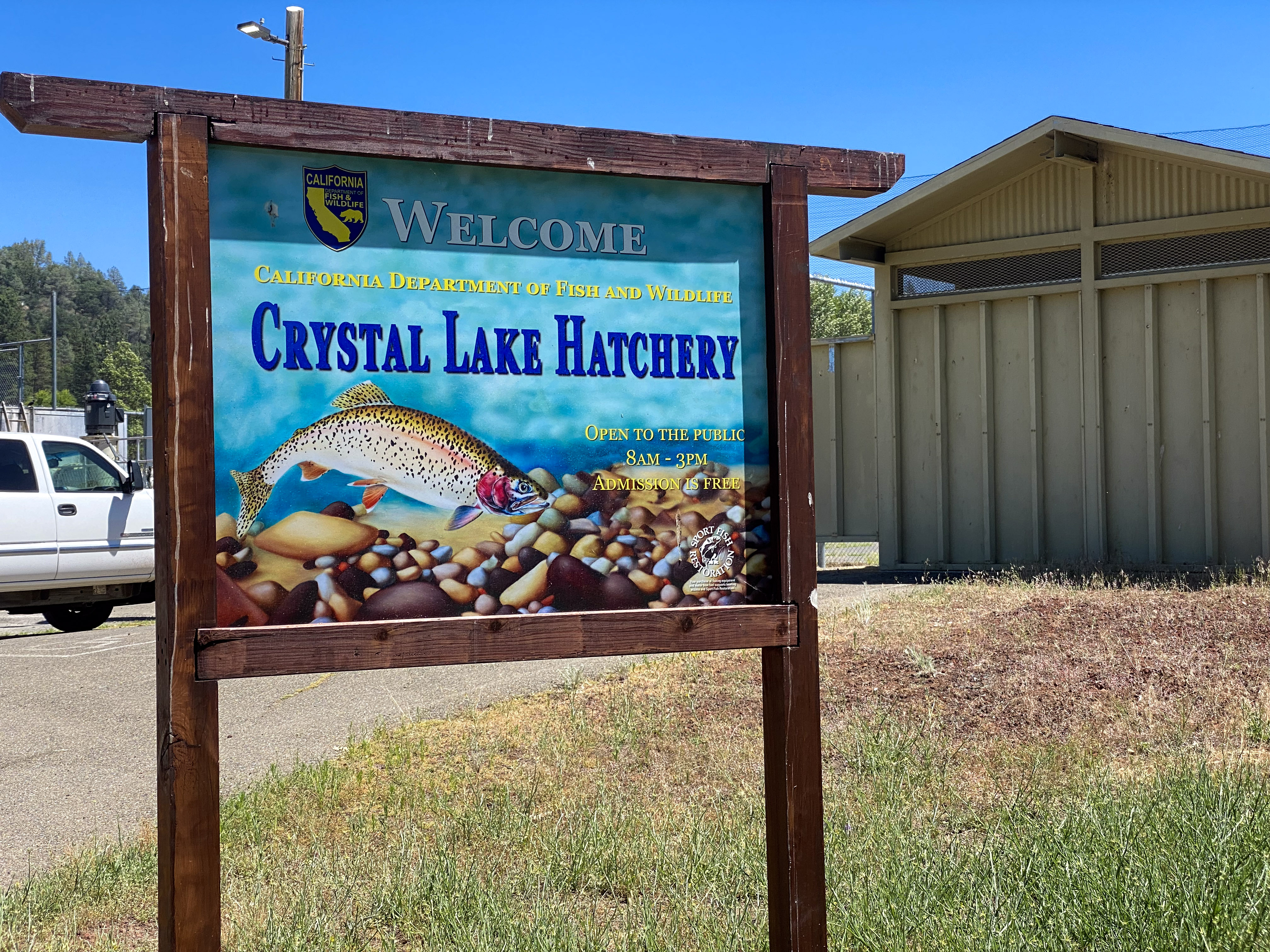

Crystal Lake Fish Hatchery is a fish hatchery run by the California Department of Fish and Game, located in Cassel, California.

== Background ==
In 1885, the California Fish Commission built a salmon hatchery on Hat Creek, which flows into the Pit River. The original hatchery was 100' long, 46' wide, and could raise 10 million fertilized eggs. Unfortunately, as time went on, the salmon returns dwindled and the hatchery had to shut down. In 1915 the hatchery was set to reopen with eggs from another facility, but Mount Lassen erupted that year, and the ash and silt poisoned the water, causing the facility to be abandoned completely.

Burney Creek Hatchery was built by PG&E in lieu of installing a fish ladder over Dam 3 on the Pit River. It ran from 1927 to 1949, when the water supply in Burney Creek dried up and the hatchery had fallen into disrepair.

Most of the operations were moved to Baum Lake after that, and Crystal Lake Hatchery was opened in 1947, with 24 raceway ponds. The first year, there was a parasite outbreak, which was fixed by changing the water supply from Crystal Lake to Rock Creek, which was parasite free. The hatchery was finished in 1955 and updated in 1976, and is currently capable of raising 1.5 million fish annually. Fish from Crystal Lake are used to stock lakes and rivers throughout Lassen, Modoc, Shasta, Siskiyou, and Trinity counties.

== Catching, spawning, and raising the fish ==
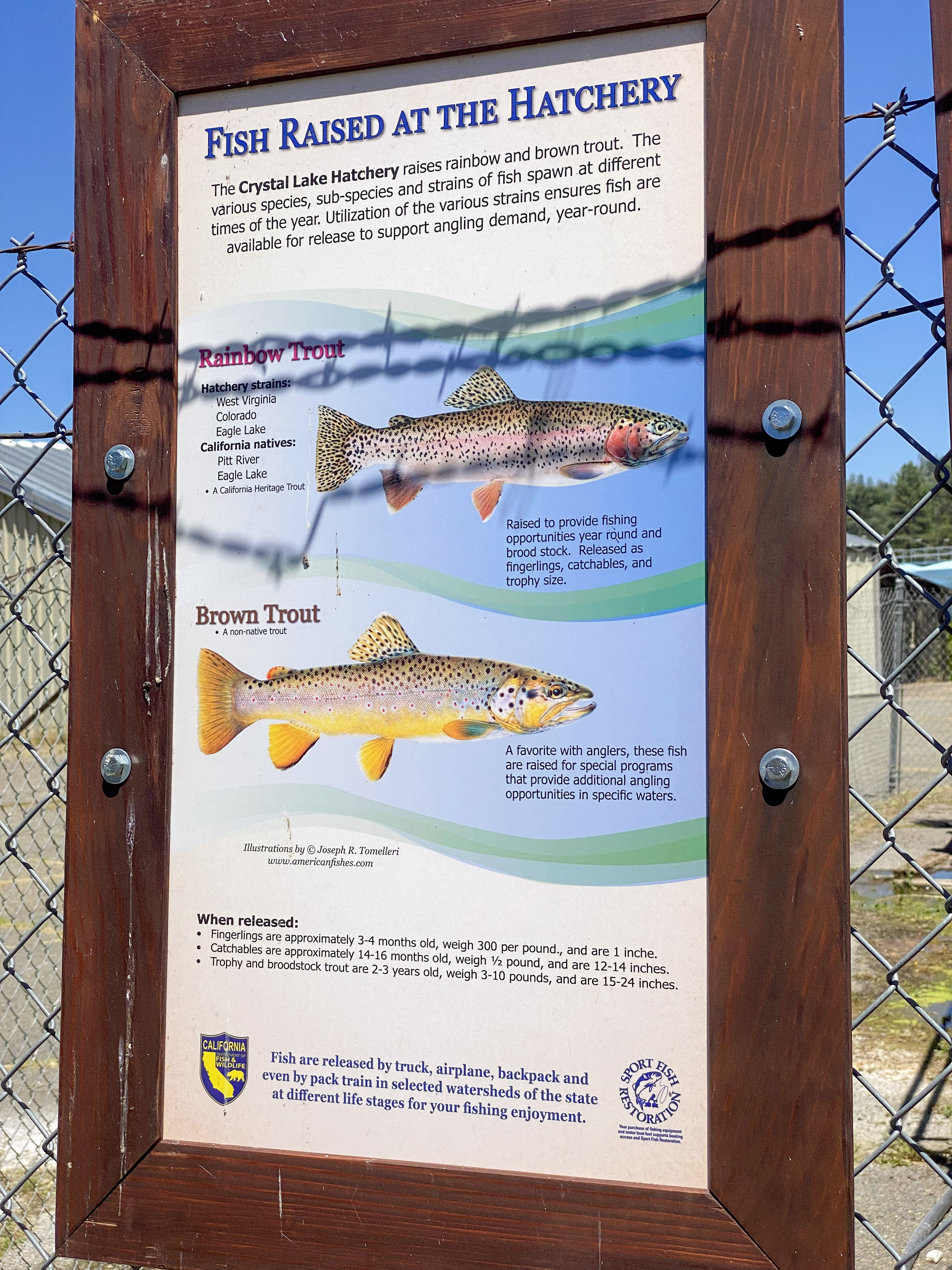

The process first begins at the Pine Creek Fish Trap. Workers from the hatchery collect fish to be spawned, then sort through them to select the strongest and healthiest fish. Then they express the fish eggs and milt, before allowing the eggs to be fertilized. Fertilized eggs are hatched indoors, then raised to fry before being released to the raceways.

The raceways are long concrete structures, with a gentle slope and dams at intervals along its length. Fish naturally separate themselves into groups by size, from fry to adults. Once the fish are old enough, they are taken from the raceways and released into the waters that Crystal Lake stocks.

== Fish species ==
Crystal Lake Hatchery raises different species of trout that are native and acclimated to their release location. They breed Eagle Lake trout, brown trout, Pit River rainbow trout, and the Eastern Brook trout.

Eagle Lake trout – These are caught in the Pine Creek Fish Trap, which is located about a mile from Eagle Lake (Lassen County). These fish are able to tolerate very alkaline water, making them very suitable for the areas they are released in.

Brown trout – This is one of the most common sport fishing species, and can be found just about anywhere there is trout fishing.

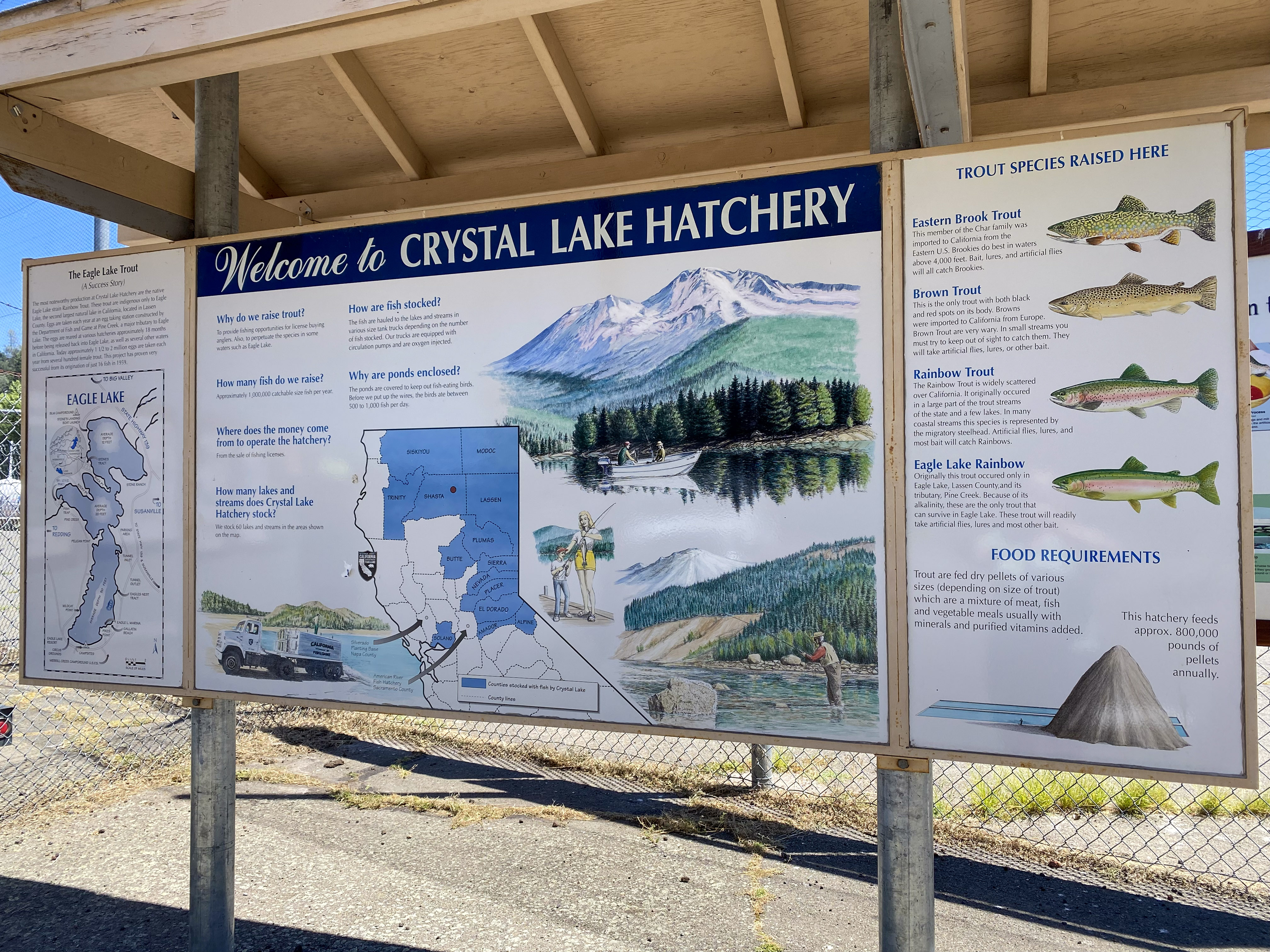

Pit River rainbow trout – Also known for high tolerance for alkalinity and can only be found in Eagle Lake and Pine Creek.

Eastern brook trout – This species is native to the eastern part of the United States, and are sensitive to changes in water quality and acidity.

== Gallery ==
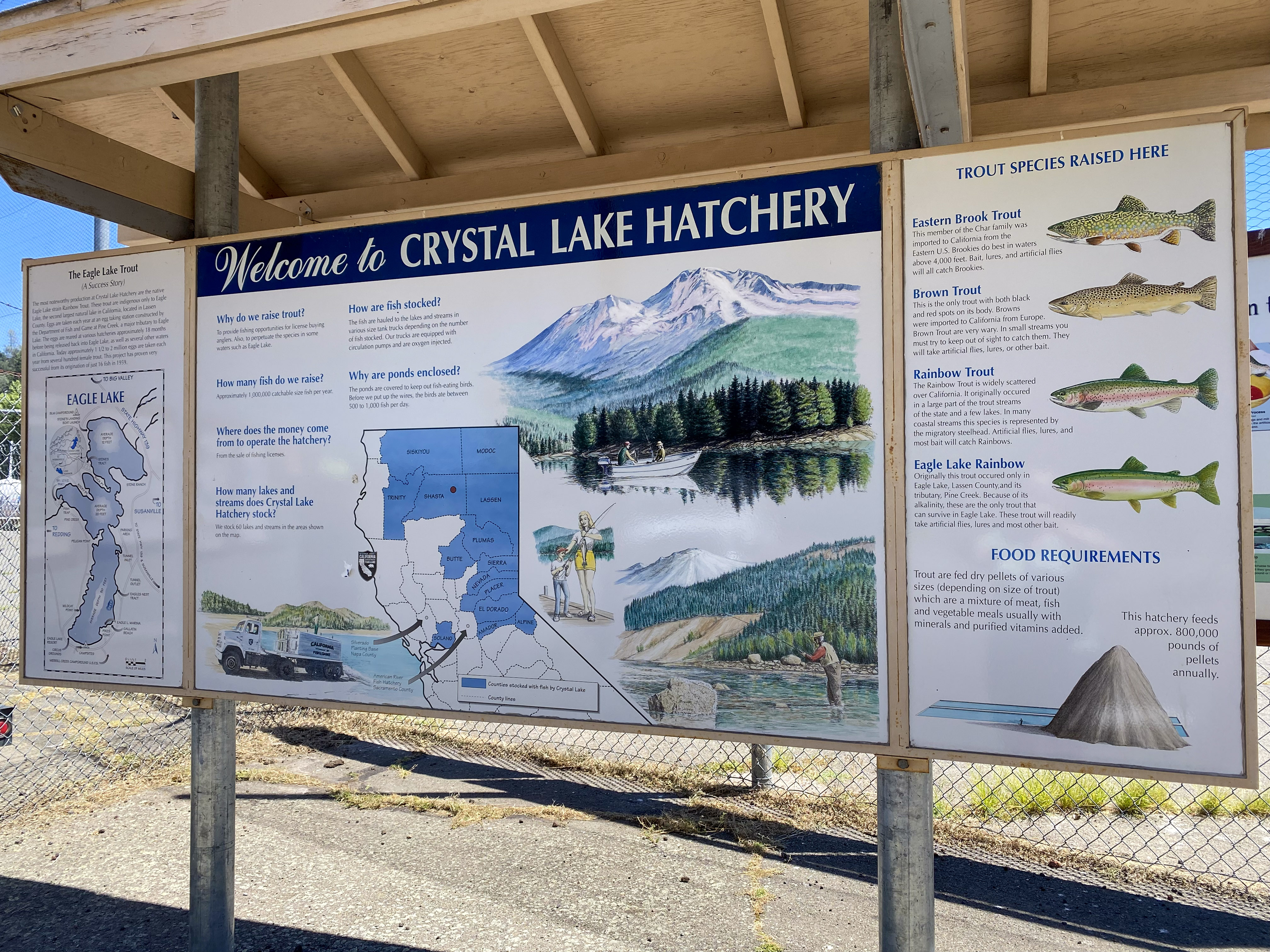

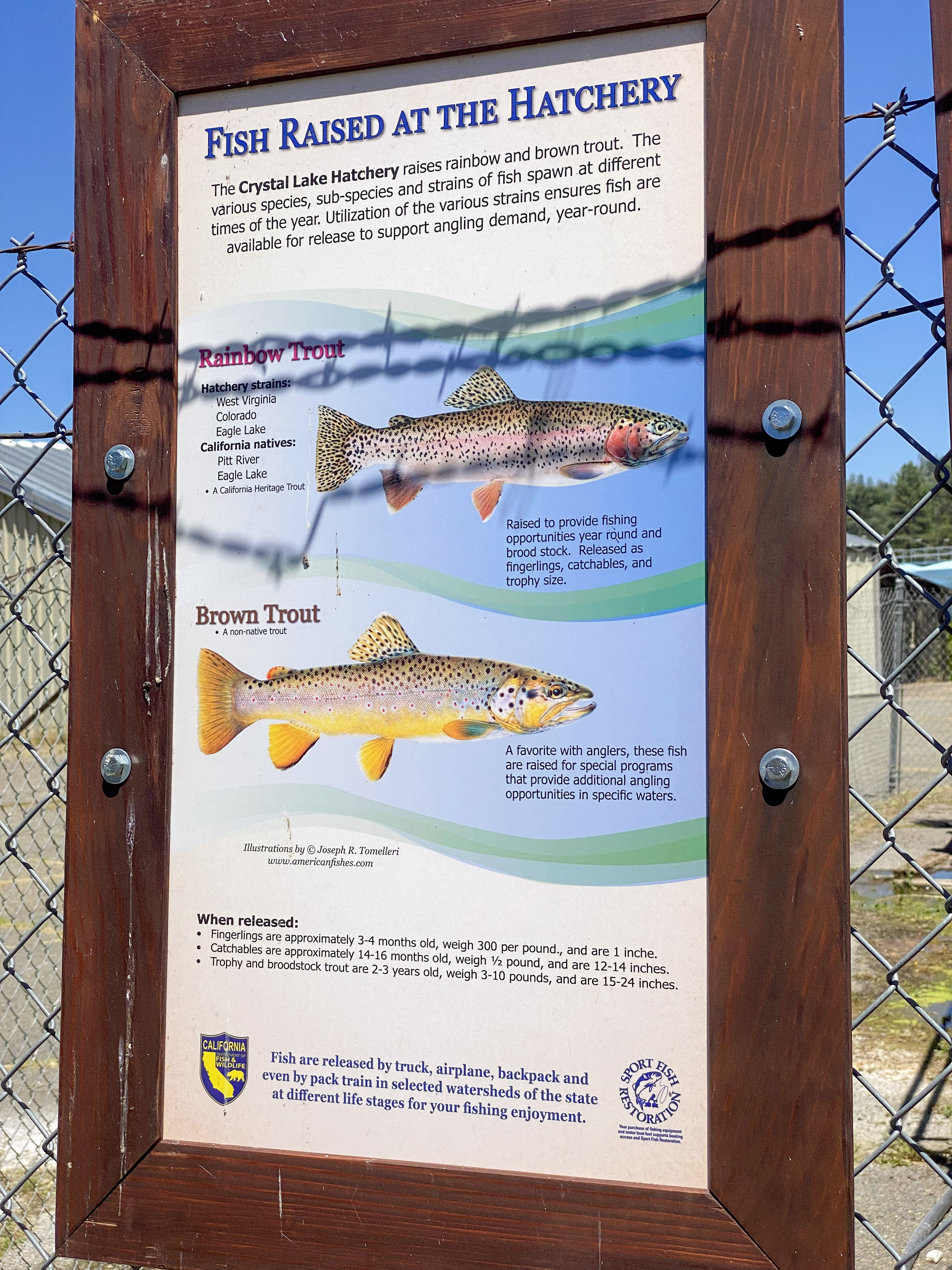

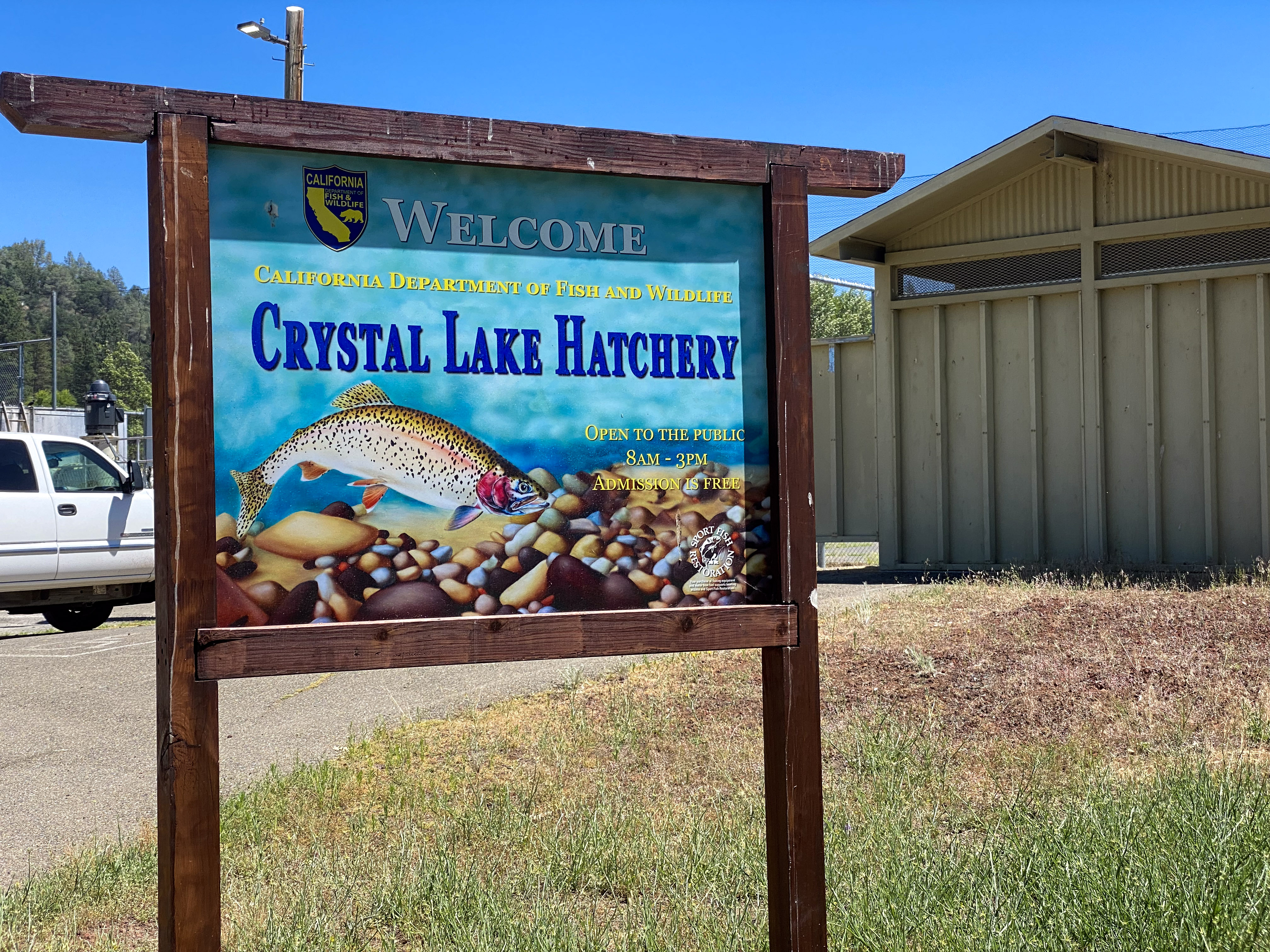

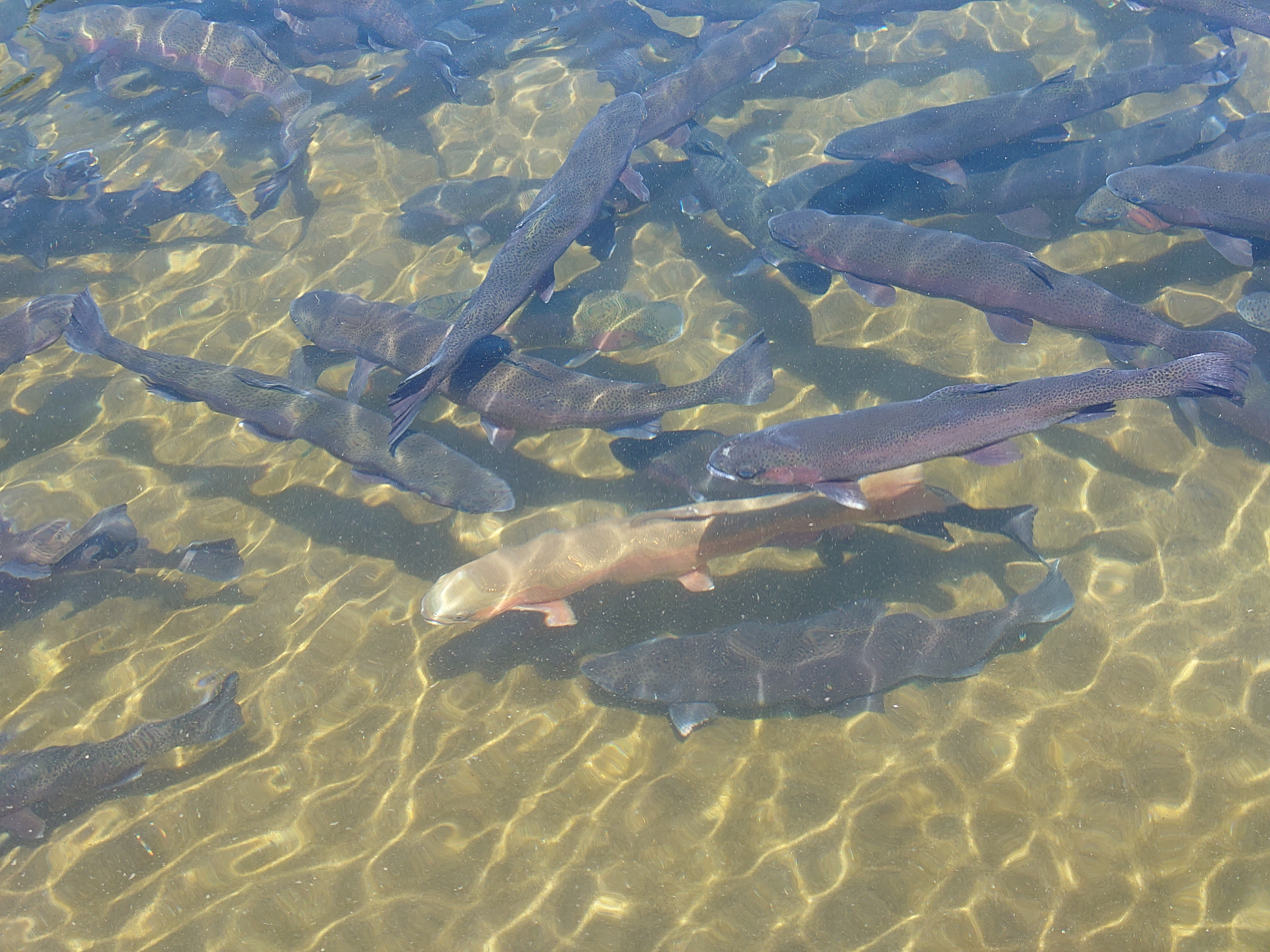

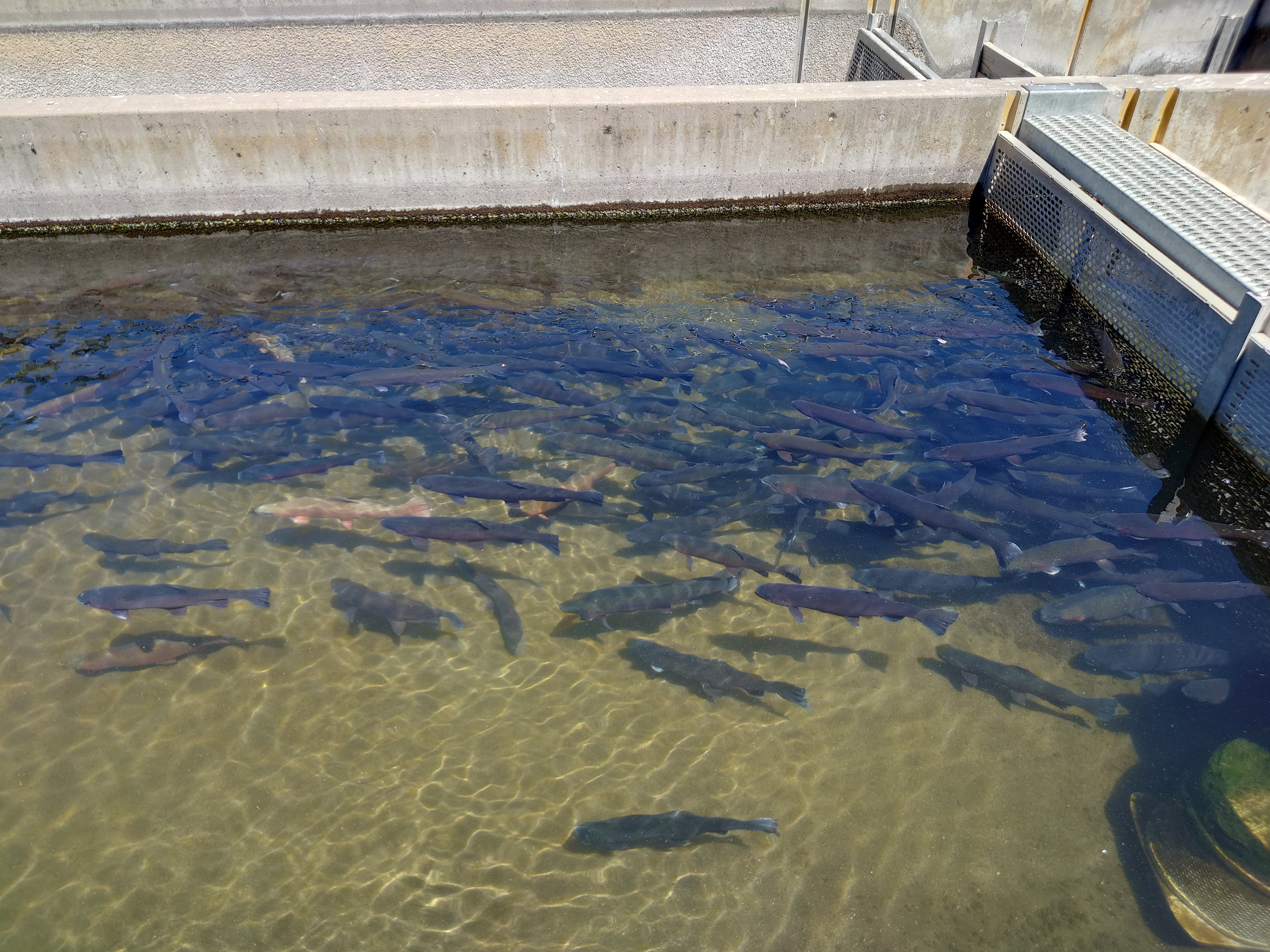

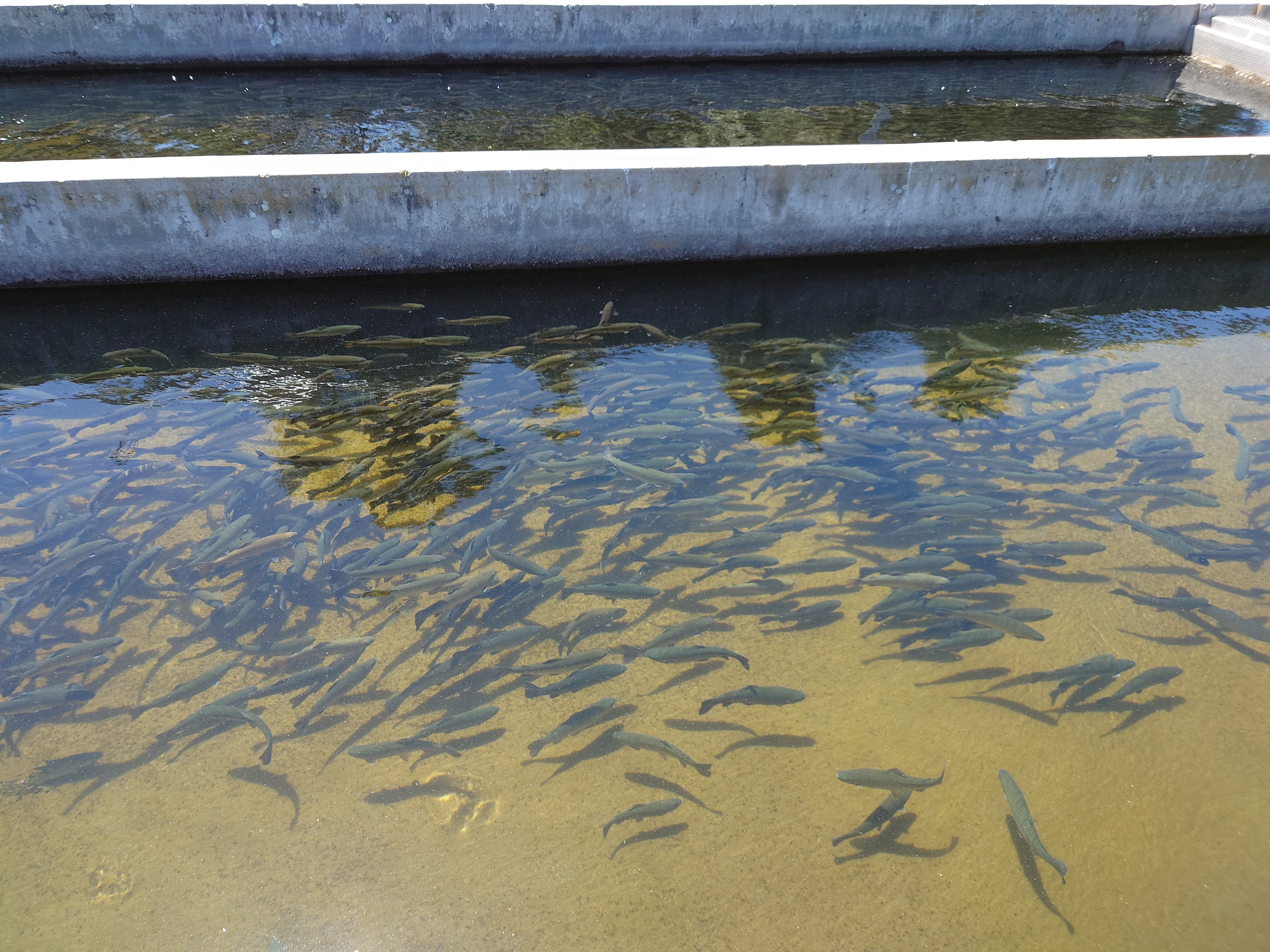

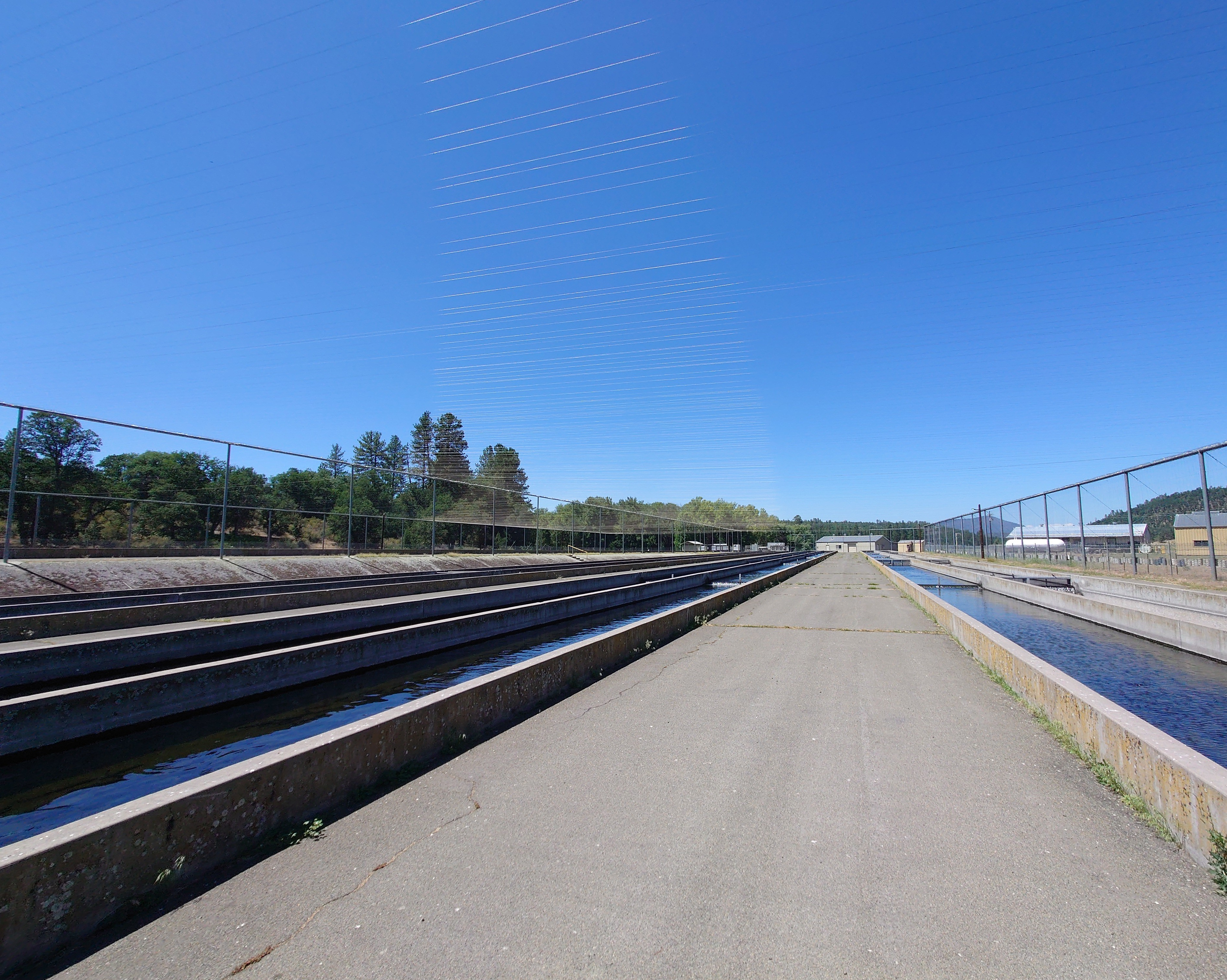
