= Kamloops (disambiguation) =

Kamloops is a city in British Columbia, Canada.

Kamloops may also refer to:

- Kamloops Lake, a lake along the Thompson River, British Columbia, Canada
- Kamloops Indian Band or Tk’umlups Indian Band, a First Nations government within the Shuswap Nation Tribal Council, Canada
- Kamloops (federal electoral district), a defunct federal electoral district in British Columbia, Canada
- Kamloops (provincial electoral district), a provincial electoral district in British Columbia, Canada
- SS Kamloops, a sunken lake freighter of Canada Steamship Lines
- Kamloops Airport, an airport in British Columbia, Canada
- Kamloops Water Aerodrome, an airport in British Columbia, Canada
- Kamloops Heritage Railway, a railway in Kamloops, British Columbia, Canada
- Kamloops rainbow trout, a variety of fish
