= Kamchatkan rainbow trout =

Scientific classification
- Kingdom: Animalia
- Phylum: Chordata
- Class: Actinopterygii
- Division: Teleostei
- Order: Salmoniformes
- Family: Salmonidae
- Genus: Oncorhynchus
- Species: O. mykiss
- Subspecies: O. m. mykiss

Trinomial name
- Oncorhynchus mykiss mykiss (Walbaum, 1792)

Synonyms
- Parasalmo mykiss Parasalmo penshinensis

Subspecies of fish

The Kamchatkan rainbow trout (Oncorhynchus mykiss mykiss) is a subspecies of the rainbow trout, which is a fish in the family Salmonidae. It is native to Russian Far East. Its main range is on the Kamchatka Peninsula, and it has also been recorded from the Commander Islands east of Kamchatka, and sporadically in the Sea of Okhotsk, as far south as the mouth of the Amur River.

== Size ==
This species reaches a length of 122 cm (48 in).

== Sea-run and freshwater ecotypes ==
The Kamchatkan rainbow trout ("mikizha") comprises various ecological forms, including anadromous and resident freshwater forms and their intermediates. Russian taxonomy has long attributed the rainbow trout to the genus Parasalmo, and has further considered the Kamchatkan rainbow trout as composed of two distinct species, Parasalmo mykiss and Parasalmo penshinensis, whose ranges overlap. P. mykiss is a resident freshwater and estuary form, whereas P. penshinensis, "Kamchatkan salmon", is the sea-run, migrating anadromous form, which may grow to a length of 100 cm and 11–12 kg weight (as with the American steelhead). P. penshinensis is considered critically endangered (CR) in the Red Book of Kamchatka. Modern research however suggests that the two forms represent the same species, showing no genetic isolation or differences.
