= Steelhead =

Anadromous form of fresh-water species of fish

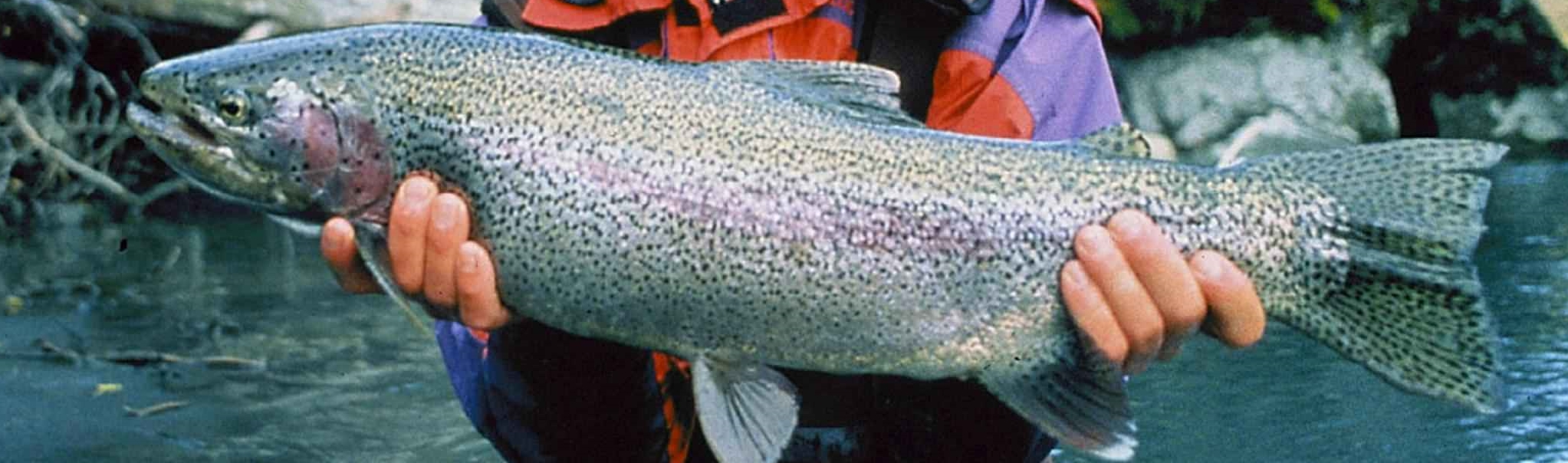
Adult steelhead showing color upon returning to fresh water

Steelhead, or occasionally steelhead trout, is the anadromous form of the coastal rainbow trout (Oncorhynchus mykiss irideus) or Columbia River redband trout (O. m. gairdneri, also called redband steelhead). Steelhead are native to cold-water tributaries of the Pacific basin in Northeast Asia and North America. Like other sea-run (anadromous) trout and salmon, steelhead spawn in freshwater, smolts migrate to the ocean to forage for several years and adults return to their natal streams to spawn. Steelhead are iteroparous, although their survival rate is approximately only 10–20%.

== Description ==
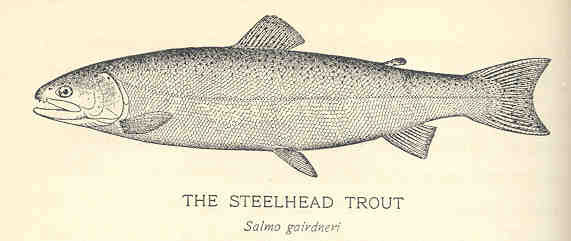
Steelhead in 1924 illustration using the original taxonomic name, Salmo gairdneri

The freshwater form of the steelhead is the rainbow trout (Oncorhynchus mykiss). The difference between these forms of the species is that steelhead migrate to the ocean and return to freshwater tributaries to spawn, whereas non-anadromous rainbow trout do not leave freshwater. Steelhead are also larger and less colorful than rainbow trout. Steelhead can weigh up to 55 lb (25 kg) and can reach 45 in (110 cm) in length, but are typically much smaller at around 8 lb (3.6 kg). In the wild, they usually live four to six years and spawn multiple times. The body of the steelhead trout is silvery and streamlined with a rounder head. This silver color and round head is what gives the steelhead its name. There are black dots that are more concentrated on the back of the fish and become sparser closer to the lateral line of the fish. Steelhead also develop a pink horizontal stripe. When steelhead return to freshwater to spawn, their color begins to more closely resemble that of a normal rainbow trout. The longer a steelhead spends in freshwater, the darker their green body colorations and horizontal pink stripe become. When a steelhead exits the river and returns to the ocean again, it regains its silvery appearance while in saltwater. The fish develop a larger and stronger tail relative to a normal rainbow trout to help aid in swimming in ocean currents and swimming up strong river currents.

A number of distinct population segments of steelhead are endangered or threatened across the United States, with their decline largely attributed to causes such as changing ocean conditions, overharvest, hatcheries, habitat destruction, and the blocking of waterways by the construction of dams. Human interaction has had considerable consequences on reducing the population of steelhead trout.

== Characteristics ==
Steelhead currently support or have historically supported fisheries across Northern California, and thus they hold "economic as well as cultural value" (Moyle, Israel, & Purdy, 2008). Contrary to popular belief, the California Steelhead is a coastal variation of the same species of fish as the Rainbow Trout, Oncorhynchus mykiss; "rainbow trout are the 'landlocked' variant, and remain in freshwater throughout their life" (King County, 2016). An ocean-going variety, the Steelhead, or Oncorhynchus mykiss irideus has developed unique adaptive characteristics that distinguish this fish from its common counterpart and have allowed a wider distribution of this species across the Pacific Northwest, including the coastal regions of California. In fact, "coastal rainbow trout is the most widely-distributed native trout form" (CA.gov). Among other necessary biological utilities fulfilled by this species, Steelhead Trout "are also strong indicators of the condition of California's streams; large self-sustaining populations of native salmon and trout are found where streams are in reasonably good condition" (Moyle, Israel, & Purdy, 2008). A chrome underside and olive-grey back reminiscent to that of a steel beam are attributed as the main defining physical characteristic for which the Steelhead is distinguished and earns its namesake.

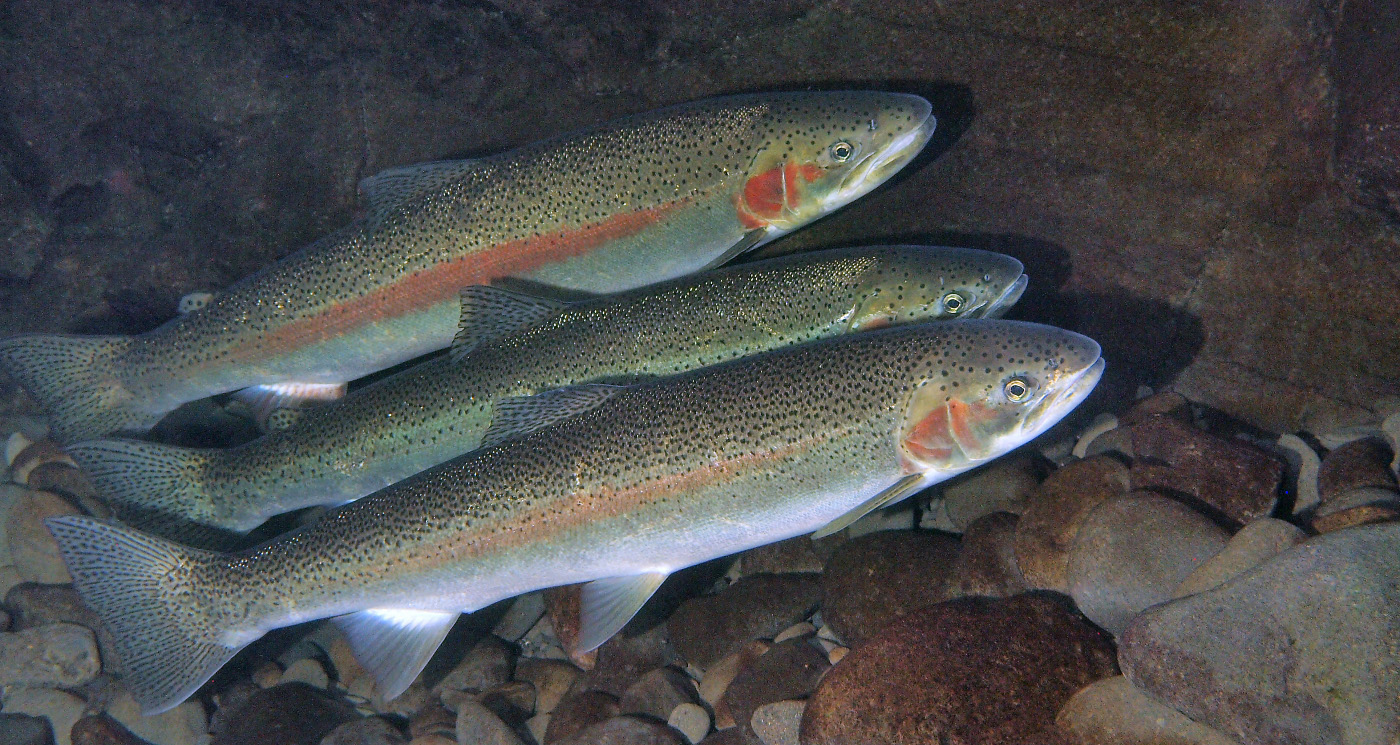
Steelhead trout drift in an Oregon stream.

The Steelhead is an ocean-going predatory fish with a typical lifespan of four to six years. Like the common rainbow trout, Steelhead predominantly feast on zooplankton when they are young and then transition to eating fish, some rodents, mollusks, and crustaceans. When these fish enter the open ocean, however, their diet typically consists of squid, crustaceans, and small fish including anchovies, herring, and sardines, though the capacity at which this dietary intake occurs is highly contingent upon the geographical region where Steelhead choose to migrate (Salmon Fishing Now). "Rainbow trout and steelhead represent two divergent ecotypes that are genetically identical but separated by life history strategies" (Heath 2001); the unique biological diversity of the Steelhead Trout from that of the Rainbow Trout is determined through a capacity to migrate to the open ocean. Homing behavior is a unique adaptation of Steelhead Trout that allows the fish to migrate to and from freshwater and saltwater bodies on multiple occasions. Through the process of imprinting, Steelhead Trout deposit a chemical indicator "that is specific to their natal stream" (NRC 1996).

=== Homing behavior ===
Perhaps the most interesting and perplexing characteristic of the Steelhead Trout is its homing behavior and the capacity of this species to accurately detect its primary spawning grounds despite venturing to the open ocean and returning to the same freshwater source on numerous occasions throughout their lives. By recording the concentrations of solutes and the chemical profile of a stream through the biological characteristic of a chemical indicator, steelhead "use the position of the sun and magnetic north to navigate towards spawning grounds " after they have fed in the open ocean for 1–4 whole years (Fulton). Even after traveling hundreds of miles, this chemical imprint allows steelhead to identify their precise hatching grounds upon returning to freshwater. According to "A review of the characteristics, habitat requirements, and ecology of the Anadromous Steelhead Trout" by Fulton, "homing creates genetically different subpopulations that differ by basin, stream, and even location within a stream" (Altukhov 2000). According to a study conducted by Heath & Pollard, "significant genetic variation on the individual, tributary, and watershed level occur between Steelhead Trout populations" as a result of this chemical reliance for breeding practices (Heath, 2001). The author concludes that as a result of such biologically accurate homing characteristics, the Steelhead Trout is "uniquely adapted to its environment"; fish populations "are reasonably isolated from fish that spawn in different areas," and therefore "sub-populations may differ by the timing of runs, size of fish, and even behavior patterns" (Heath, 2001). This also influences genetic relatedness between Steelhead Trout populations; interestingly, the author found that the genetic similarity of regional Steelhead trout populations "is correlated with distance" (Heath, 2001).

== Spawning ==
During spawning, the fish will lay their eggs on gravel bottoms of freshwater tributaries. The female digs out a hole called a redd. The preferred depth for steelhead spawning is 6 to 14 inches (150 to 360 mm). She then lays the eggs, and a male fertilizes them. The females will then cover the eggs with the gravel. Depending on the size of the female she may lay up to 9,000 eggs. The female then buries the eggs in a foot of gravel. The eggs remain in the gravel until they hatch. Unlike salmon (which can spawn only once) steelhead may return to the ocean, and come back upstream several times for spawning season.

== Atlantic Canada ==
Small numbers of steelhead are present in Atlantic Canada.

== Great Lakes ==
Even though they do not enter the sea, Great Lakes rainbow trout experience the same physiological changes that prepare them for it. Steelhead are not native to the Great Lakes, but were introduced into the Au Sable River in Michigan in 1876. Within 11 years, naturalized steelhead were seen in the Muskegon River participating in spawning runs. Agencies of multiple states consider the fish to be naturalized in both Lake Erie and Lake Superior of the Great Lakes. These fish are commonly given the title steelhead rather than rainbow trout when mentioned in official communications.

Wild reproduction occurs across each of the Great Lakes in varying amounts. In Lake Superior these steelhead are considered mostly wild, and in Lake Ontario steelhead have been observed reproducing since the 1930s. Lake Michigan's wild population of steelhead are mainly observed in the tributaries in Michigan as opposed to Wisconsin, Illinois and Indiana. Lake Erie relies on stocked steelhead and rainbow trout yearlings as the warm water tributaries limit natural reproduction.

In 2025, more than 1.2 million were stocked by many jurisdictions in Lake Erie to continue this steelhead fishery, with Pennsylvania leading the stocking effort. The amount stocked in Lake Erie by jurisdiction in 2025 follows: Pennsylvania (497,648; 39.8%), Ohio (464,538; 37.1%), New York (191,150; 15.3%), Michigan (49,785; 3.8%), and Ontario (48,291; 4%).

== Conservation status ==
There have been several conservation programs created since the steelhead were driven to near-extinction in the 1940s. The reduction in population is mainly due to manmade obstructions within river systems. This is usually caused by dams blocking access, or humans changing the river landscape for recreation and access to water. It is estimated that only 500 steelhead trout return to the Southern California watersheds. However, in other areas of the United States, steelhead can be seen as pests because they are an invasive species to the environment.

=== Southern California ===
While numbers are improving in areas of the Pacific Northwest where Steelhead Trout have typically thrived, the California Steelhead Trout is considered a threatened species, and according to Mark Capelli of the National Marine Fisheries Service, the Southern California steelhead are the most endangered of them all (California Trout). According to California Trout, Steelhead Trout populations began to decline in the "late-1940s due mainly to man-made landscape modifications" (California Trout). As a result of damming for flood control, steelhead migration routes from the coast to upstream spawning grounds were increasingly blocked over time (California Trout). Furthermore, largely a result of continued urbanization and to satisfy the needs of human populations in the area, river flows became modified for recreational purposes and a substantial diversion of water occurred over time (California Trout). As a result of widespread habitat loss and fragmentation, Southern California Steelhead populations were officially labeled as an endangered species in 1997 (California Trout). In some areas, a recent sighting of the Steelhead Trout has not occurred in years, and biologists fear the worst. In 2002, the endangered species label was extended from the Malibu Creek down to the border of San Diego and Mexico (California Trout).

=== Northern California ===
A threatened species since 2000, the Northern California steelhead represents a beacon of hope for continued rehabilitation initiatives and growing population numbers in the area. As of 2016, 48,892 Steelhead Trout were reportedly caught (NOAA). Such a population count suggests that this fascinating fish species continue to persevere in Northern California waters. However, to ensure the continued rehabilitation of steelhead populations in Northern California, a positive, directive plan of action for steelhead conservation must occur. According to NOAA, The State of California Fisheries Restoration Grant Program (FRGP) "invested over 250 million dollars and supported approximately 3,500 salmonid restoration projects" (NOAA). Investments in projects improving "fish passage, water quality, instream habitat restoration, watershed monitoring, and education and organizational support" all occupy conservation efforts to improve Northern California steelhead populations (NOAA). According to NOAA, "the percentage of floodplain and in-channel habitat that would need to be restored to detect a 25% increase in salmon and steelhead production was 20%" (NOAA). As it stands, "more than 20% of floodplain and in-channel habitat has been restored due to FRGP" (NOAA). Though these initiatives spell hope for the prospects of Steelhead Trout population rehabilitation, habitat degradation continues to occur at an alarming rate.

=== Oregon ===
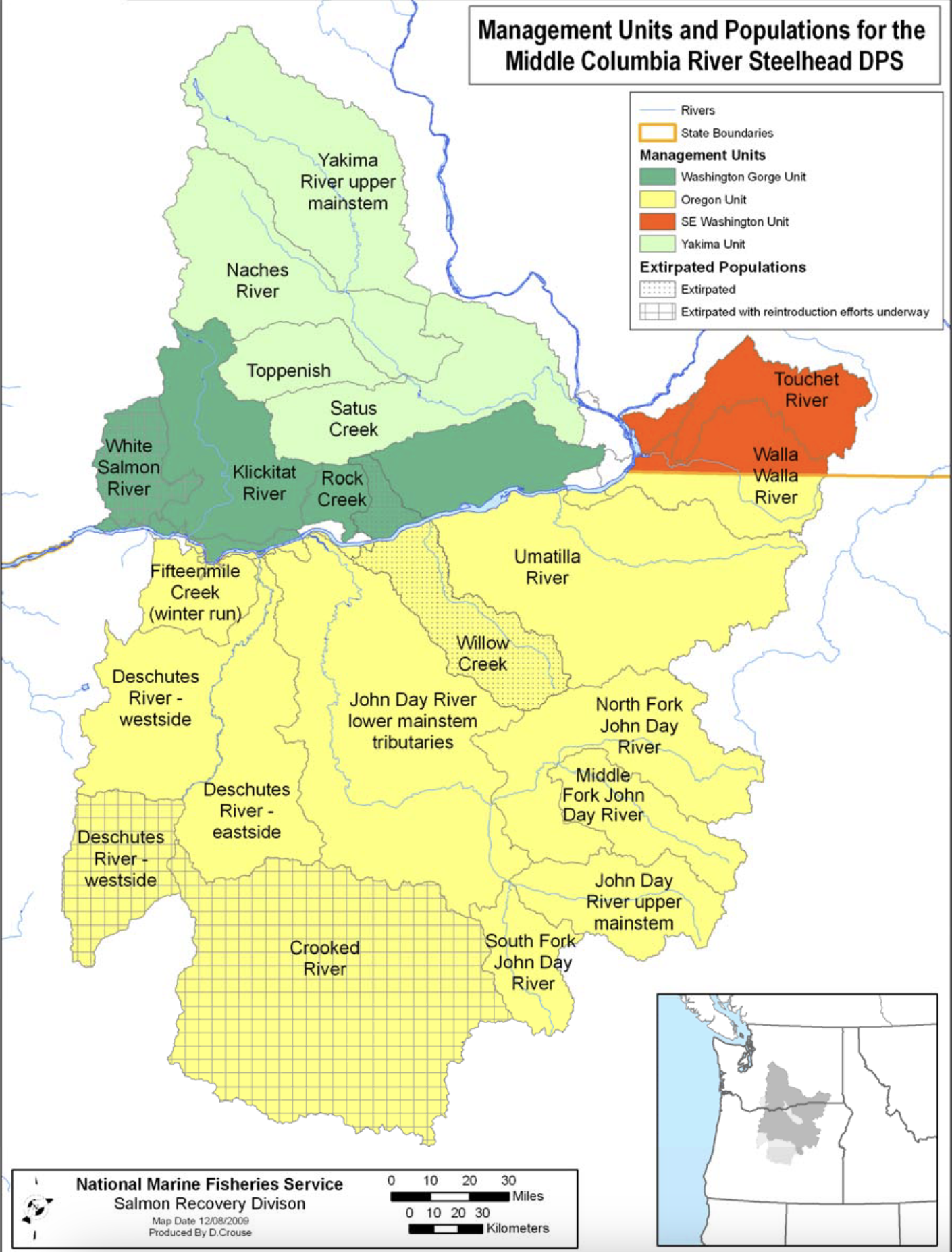
Management Units and Population Segments for the MCR Steelhead.

Within the state of Oregon there are four different distinct steelhead population segments: Lower Columbia River steelhead, Middle Columbia River steelhead, Oregon Coast steelhead, and Upper Willamette River Steelhead (NOAA). Of these four segments, three are listed as threatened under the Endangered Species Act. The Middle Columbia River (MCR) segment has remained the focus of recent recovery efforts. The MCR segment covers approximately 3,500 square miles of the Columbia Plateau in eastern Oregon and Washington. Within eastern Oregon, recovery efforts focus on the two main tributaries to the Columbia River: The Deschutes River and the John Day River, although the Umatilla and Walla Walla are also included in recovery plans. Primary threats to MCR steelhead populations include hydrosystem operations, habitat alteration, and effects of stray naturally spawning hatchery fish. MCR steelhead were first listed as threatened on March 25, 1999, following the construction of Round Butte Dam at the confluence of the Deschutes and Metolius rivers. The construction of the dam created reverse currents (currents flowing upstream) in the Metolius Arm of Lake Billy Chinook (a reservoir created by the formation of the dam) confusing anadromous smolts and preventing them from navigating seaward. The construction of Round Butte Dam impeded steelhead access to the Upper Deschutes, Crooked, and Metolius rivers, three major tributaries to the Deschutes within the MCR watershed. In addition to Round Butte, several other dams restrict fish from their native spawning grounds within the Deschutes watershed including Pelton Dam, Bowman Dam, and Ochoco Dam. The first MCR Distinct Population Segment ESA Recovery Plan was released on November 30, 1999. Between 2010 and 2016 1,715 different entities have implemented 1,559 tributary restoration projects primarily focused on habitat restoration and fish passage improvement. In a 2016 an action plan implementation progress report stated the population is "maintained" showing no significant upward or downward trend in the yearly number of returning adults in an experimental small tributary to the Deschutes River. However, fish counts at Boneville Dam, on the Columbia River below the Deschutes confluence have shown a 10 year (2013–2022) average of 162,988 returning adults, and a four year (2019–2022) average of 97,352, suggesting a recent decline in rates of returning adults.

== Notes ==
Robert J. Behnke monograph

Aaron Fulton. "A Review of the Characteristics, Habitat Requirements, and Ecology of the Anadromous Steelhead Trout (Oncorhynchus Mykiss) in the Skeena Basin," June 15, 2004, p. 16.

"Coastal Multispecies Plan Volume III: Northern California Steelhead." NOAA Fisheries, 2016. https://www.fisheries.noaa.gov/resource/document/final-coastal-multispecies-recovery-plan-california-coastal-chinook-salmon.

"Coastal Rainbow Trout/ Steelhead." California Department of Fish and Wildlife, October 29, 2016. https://wildlife.ca.gov/Conservation/Fishes/Coastal-Rainbow-Trout-Steelhead.

"Fish Hatcheries." In Fishing in Idaho. Idaho Department of Fish and Game, n.d. https://idfg.idaho.gov/visit/hatchery.

Peter B. Moyle, Joshua A. Israel, and Sabra E. Purdy. "Salmon, Steelhead, and Trout in California: Status of an Emblematic Fauna." California Trout, 2008, 220.

"Rainbow Trout and Steelhead." National Wildlife Federation, n.d. https://www.nwf.org/Educational-Resources/Wildlife-Guide/Fish/Rainbow-Trout-Steelhead.

"Southern Steelhead: A Story of Recovery." California Trout, February 7, 2018. https://caltrout.org/news/southern-steelhead-story-recovery.

"Steelhead Trout." Salmon Fishing Now, 2018. https://www.salmonfishingnow.com/steelhead-trout-biology/.

"Steelhead Trout." In NOAA Fisheries. NATIONAL OCEANIC AND ATMOSPHERIC ADMINISTRATION, n.d. https://www.fisheries.noaa.gov/species/steelhead-trout.

"Steelhead Trout Identification." King County, November 10, 2016. https://www.kingcounty.gov/services/environment/animals-and-plants/salmon-and-trout/identification/steelhead.aspx.

V. Kuhnlein, Harriet, and Murray M. Humphries. "Rainbow Trout (Steelhead Trout)." In Traditional Animal Foods of Indigenous Peoples of Northern North America. Centre for Indigenous Peoples' Nutrition and Environment, n.d. http://traditionalanimalfoods.org/fish/freshwater/page.aspx?id=6151.
