= Eagle Lake trout =

Conservation status
- Critically Imperiled (NatureServe)

Scientific classification
- Kingdom: Animalia
- Phylum: Chordata
- Class: Actinopterygii
- Order: Salmoniformes
- Family: Salmonidae
- Genus: Oncorhynchus
- Species: O. mykiss
- Subspecies: O. m. aquilarum

Trinomial name
- Oncorhynchus mykiss aquilarum (Snyder, 1917)

Subspecies of fish

Eagle Lake trout (Oncorhynchus mykiss aquilarum) is a subspecies of rainbow trout endemic to Eagle Lake, in Lassen County, California. It is a type of trout known for its ability to withstand high alkalinity. Its unique adaptations to the harsh environment of Eagle Lake make the fish a specialist with a very narrow environmental specificity.

The Eagle Lake Trout is a State Species of Special Concern, but not considered endangered according to the Federal Endangered Species Act.

== Range ==
The Eagle Lake trout name comes from its former exclusive-endemic Eagle Lake territory. Eagle lake is approximately 24,000 acres, making it one of the largest natural lakes in California. The streams and rivers that reach the lake only connect with the lake in the late spring after the snowmelt. The lake is highly basic, with an alkalinity of pH 8-9, making it uninhabitable for many aquatic species. The Eagle Lake trout have adapted to this high pH. While formerly only in Eagle Lake, the Department of Fish and Wildlife (formerly the Department of Fish and Game) has transplanted the Eagle Lake trout into dozens of other lakes in California.

== Characteristics ==
The Eagle Lake trout has a pink horizontal band, white rimmed fins, and irregular spots across its body which become less prolific towards the belly. Large square-shaped tales, large eyes, and a large body give the fish a predatory advantage in the lake. On average the fish is about 18 inches long and 2 pounds, but they have been found to get as big as 28 inches and 10 pounds.

Eagle Lake rainbow trout are invertivores and piscivores. As young, they mainly eat leeches, amphipods, and zooplankton. As they mature, the trout consume tui chub fish.

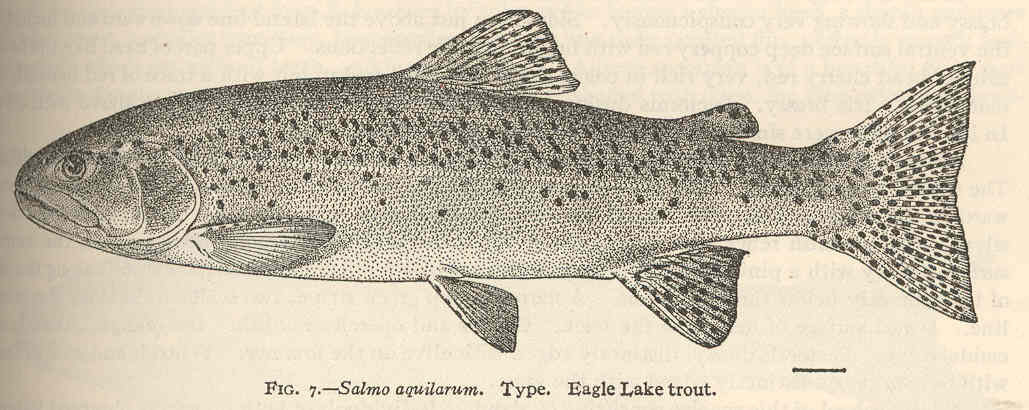
Depiction of Eagle Lake rainbow trout

Eagle Lake rainbow trout naturally spawn in Pine Creek which runs into Eagle Lake. The young trout spend the first one to two years of their life in the upper regions of the stream before swimming down into Eagle Lake. The natural environment of this tributary is shaded and gravelly. This natural spawning process is now almost wholly eradicated.

== Human uses ==
The Eagle Lake rainbow trout play a significant role in the economy of the region around Eagle Lake. The fish attracts anglers who support the local economy. The Lake allows for the use of trolling, float tubes, pontoon boats, and bait and fly fishing.

The trout are also meaningful and culturally important to the native Paiute people.

== Environmental threats ==
The Eagle Lake Trout face competition with the invasive brook trout, which first came to Eagle Lake in the 1940s. These invasive trout have taken over and damaged the habitat of important spawning locations. Logging, agriculture, anthropogenic water usage, railways, and roads also all contribute to the habitat degradation that poses a threat by blocking off the natural hydrology of Eagle Lake and its tributaries. Further barriers have made Pine Creek, the location of Eagle Lake trout spawning, inaccessible. Furthermore, climate change leading to drought and rising temperatures pose threats to the Eagle Lake ecosystem and the health of the Rainbow trout.

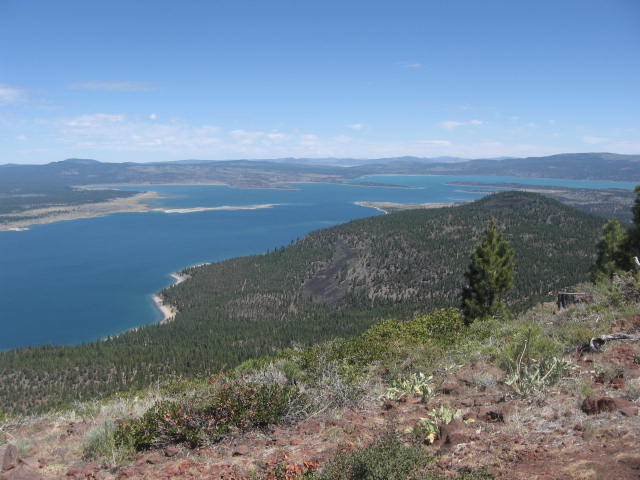
Eagle Lake in Lassen County, California

== History of conservation ==
The Eagle Lake Trout spawn in Pine Creek, the creek which runs into Eagle Lake from the Western shore. In the 1930s and 1940s, the Eagle Lake Trout population faced a massive decline due to low water levels, habitat degradation, and overfishing. By the 1950s, in an effort to replenish the trout population, a weir was installed in Pine Creek which captured the trout on their spawning migration. The Eagle Trout were bred in California state hatcheries and eventually released back into Eagle Lake. In 2012, the weir was modified and now allows the Eagle Lake trout partial entry to Pine Creek for natural reproduction.

Currently, the Crystal Lake Hatchery program releases around 200,000 fish to Eagle Lake every year. Still, modern day conservation focuses on developing a self-perpetuating population. Efforts include creating livestock-free areas, removing invasive species, and taking out culverts that reroute Pine Creek. Young, naturally spawned Eagle Lake rainbow trout have recently been discovered in Pine Creek, marking a massive success for the Eagle Lake trout conservationists. Still, the species is not yet fully sustainable and conservationists continue to work to ensure the future of the Eagle Lake Rainbow Trout.
