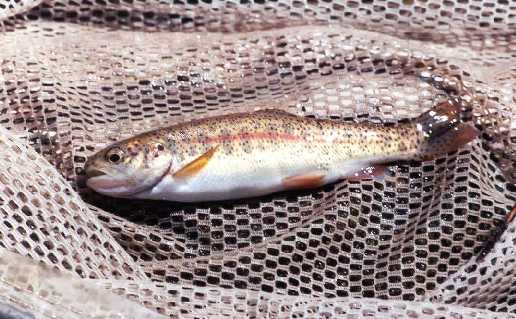
- Redband trout in the Boise National Forest, Idaho

Scientific classification
- Kingdom: Animalia
- Phylum: Chordata
- Class: Actinopterygii
- Order: Salmoniformes
- Family: Salmonidae
- Genus: Oncorhynchus
- Species: O. mykiss
- Subspecies: O. m. gairdneri

Trinomial name
- Oncorhynchus mykiss gairdneri (Richardson, 1836)

= Columbia River redband trout =

Subspecies of fish

The Columbia River redband trout, the inland redband trout or the interior redband trout (Oncorhynchus mykiss gairdneri) is one of three redband trout subspecies of the rainbow trout in the family Salmonidae. It is native in the Columbia River and its tributaries in Idaho, Oregon, Washington and Montana. It includes sea-run anadromous forms, which are known as redband steelhead. Also the large Kamloops rainbow trout is included.
