= Eagle Lake (Lassen County) =

Lake in the state of California, United States

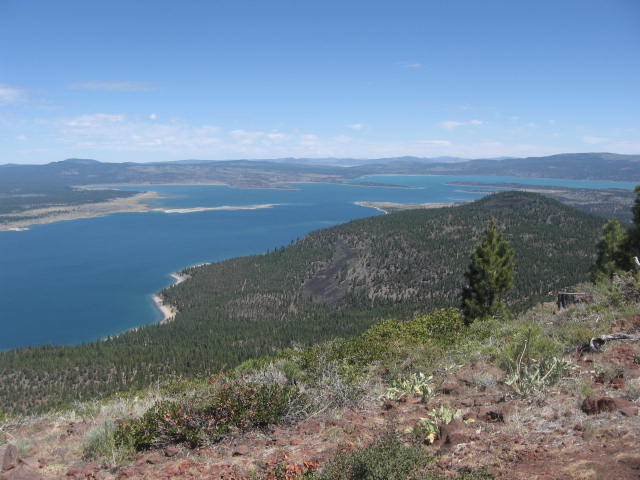
- The lake and its surroundings from a small peak above

- Location within California Location within the United States
- Location: Lassen County, California
- Coordinates: 40°38′42″N 120°44′38″W
- Catchment area: 600 sq mi (1,600 km^{2})
- Basin countries: United States
- Surface area: 24,000 acres (97.1 km^{2})
- Max. depth: 85 ft (26 m)
- Surface elevation: 5,098 ft (1,554 m)

Eagle Lake is a lake at 5,098 ft (1,554 m) elevation in Lassen County approximately 15 mi (24 km) north of Susanville, California. An endorheic alkaline lake, it is the second largest natural lake entirely in the state of California, United States.

== Ecology ==
Eagle Lake is home to osprey (Pandion haliaetus) and bald eagles (Haliaeetus leucocephalus), from which it gets its name.

Eagle Lake is the only watershed which supports native Eagle Lake trout (Oncorhynchus mykiss aquilarum). This subspecies of rainbow trout can grow to very large sizes, possibly having evolved to live longer as low flows often restrict spawning runs up their main spawning stream, Pine Creek. The average size of Eagle Lake trout are about 1.5 lb (0.68 kg) and can exceed 10 lb (4.5 kg). Adults quickly grow to a size of 17 to 18 in (43 to 46 cm) in three years and can live for up to 11 years. Since these Modoc Lakes are high in alkalinity, the trout have evolved to be the only known trout subspecies capable of surviving in the alkaline waters of Eagle Lake. Eagle Lake Rainbow descendants, however, are planted with high success in many other lakes in California. These trout were once so abundant that there was a commercial fishery for them in the late 19th century. At the same time, extensive logging and heavy livestock grazing caused Pine Creek to change from a permanent to an intermittent stream in its lower reaches. In the early 1950s the few remaining eagle lake rainbow trout at the mouth of Pine Creek were rescued and used to start a hatchery program to maintain the species and the sport fishery. Because of the complete dependence of Eagle Lake rainbow trout on hatchery production, the American Fisheries Society considers it to be a threatened species and NatureServe has listed it as critically imperiled. Peter Moyle considers it to be one of the most endangered salmonids in California. However, a petition for listing the Eagle Lake rainbow trout as a threatened species was rejected by the U.S. Fish and Wildlife Service in 1994, and a similar petition was rejected by the California State Fish and Game Commission in 2004. From 2007 to 2009 Bogard Spring Creek, a tributary to Pine Creek, was electrofished to remove non-native brook trout (Salvelinus fontinalis).

Non-native fish have not survived in the lake because of its high alkalinity, although in the early 1900s during a period of higher lake levels and falling alkalinity, Largemouth bass (Micropterus salmoides) and Brown bullhead (Ameiurus nebulosus) became abundant in the lake for some years.

Historically American white pelicans (Pelecanus erythrorhynchos) nested on Eagle Lake. They suffered from hunting by locals who mistakenly thought the pelicans ate the native trout and stopped nesting completely after 1932, when water was exported for agricultural irrigation and lowered the lake level by 10 feet (3 m), changing their nesting island into a less desirable peninsula ("Pelican Point").

== Watershed and tributaries ==
Eagle Lake was once part of a large lake on the Modoc Plateau millions of years ago. The modern lake is 15 mi (24 km) long by 1.8–2.5 mi (2.9–4.0 km) wide and is highly alkaline (pH 8-9). The lake consists of three basins, two of them averaging 16–20 ft (4.9–6.1 m) deep, the third averaging 32–65 ft (9.8–19.8 m) and reaching a depth of nearly 98 ft (30 m).

The tributaries of Eagle Lake (beginning in the lake's north end and going clockwise) are Cleghorn Creek, Papoose Creek, Merrill Creek, and Pine Creek. Pine Creek is the main tributary of Eagle Lake and is 39 miles (63 km) long. Now an intermittent stream; only the upper 6.8 miles (10.9 km) of Pine Creek has perennial flow. In 1923 the Leon Bly Tunnel was constructed to export lake water to the Honey Lake Valley via Willow Creek, a tributary of the Susan River. The 2 mi (3.2 km) long tunnel was cut through old lava flows but falling lake levels rendered it useless and a landslide partially blocked the tunnel entrance. However, a 1990 study found that lake water still flows through the tunnel although tunnel fish are from the Willow Creek assemblage.

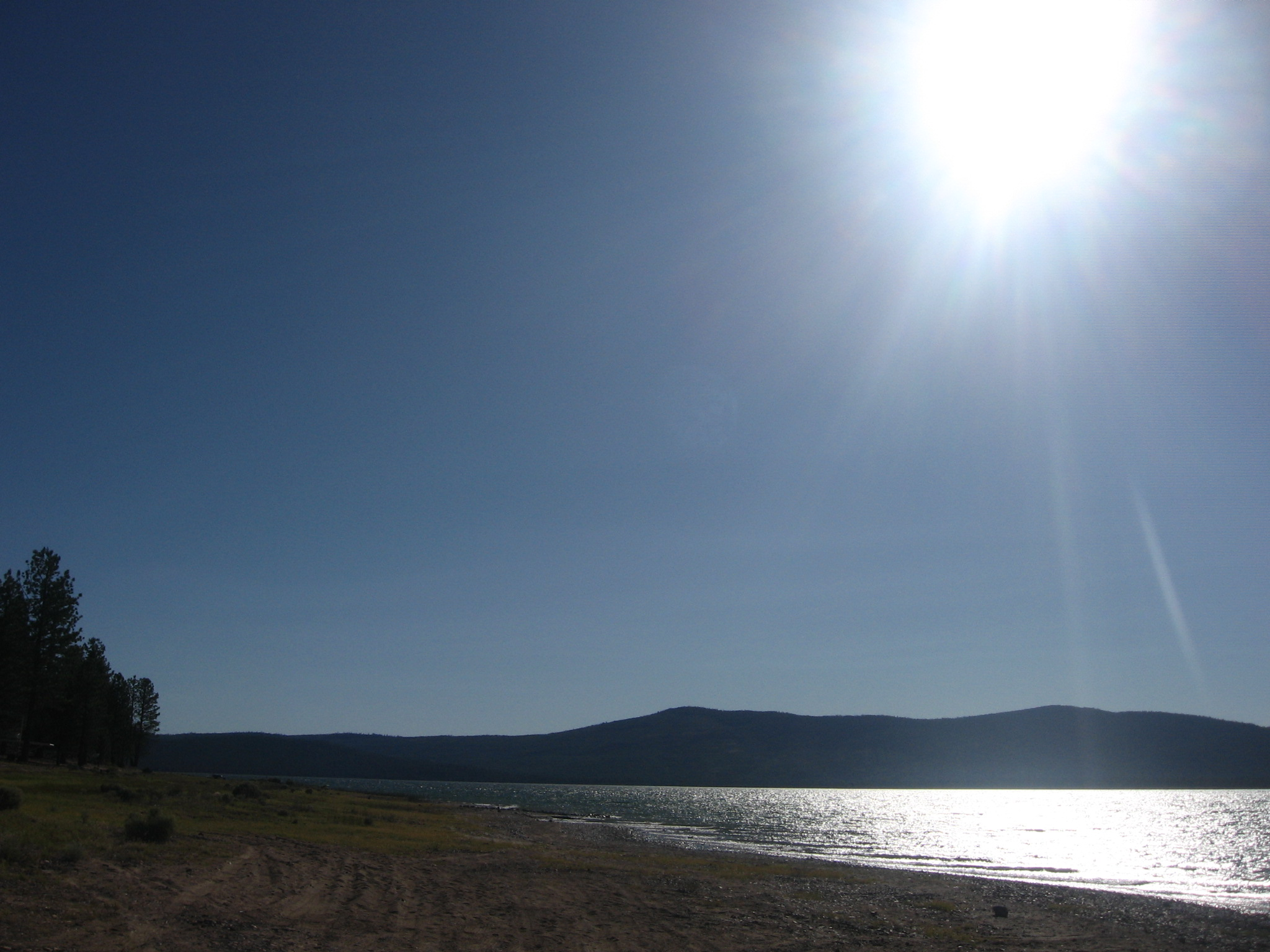
The lake just before dusk.

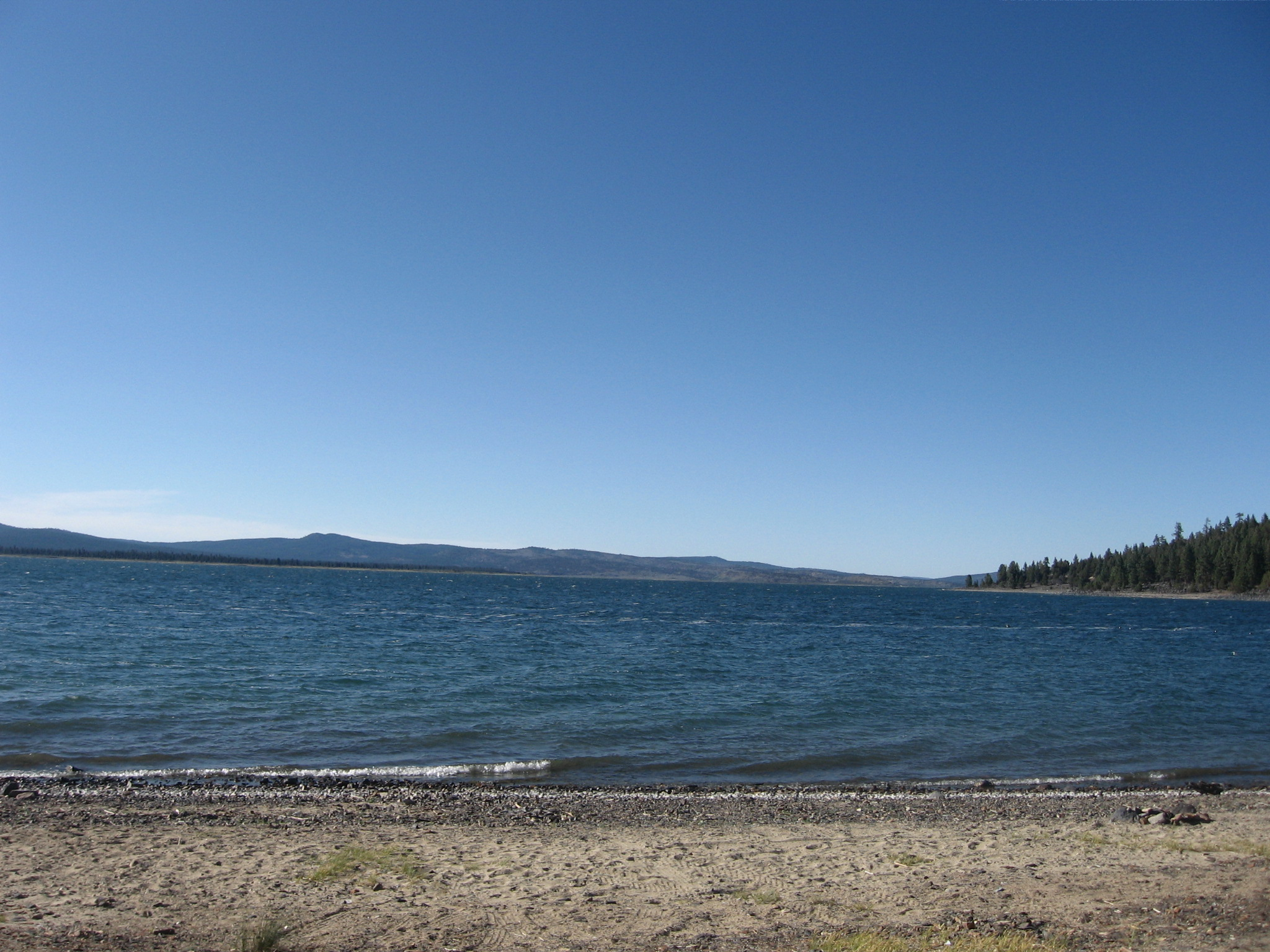
The lake in the afternoon.

== See also ==
- List of lakes in California
