= Kamloops rainbow trout =

Kamloops trout
- Juvenile Kamloops Trout from primary spawning tributary

Scientific classification
- Kingdom: Animalia
- Phylum: Chordata
- Class: Actinopterygii
- Division: Teleostei
- Order: Salmoniformes
- Family: Salmonidae
- Genus: Oncorhynchus
- Species: O. mykiss
- Subspecies: O. m. kamloops

Trinomial name
- Oncorhynchus mykiss kamloops Jordan, 1892

Subspecies of fish

The Kamloops rainbow trout or Kamloops trout (Oncorhynchus mykiss kamloops) is a local variety of the rainbow trout, a fish in the family Salmonidae. From its native range in British Columbia, Canada, it has been transferred to several other drainages in the United States. It is often considered a part of the broader Columbia River redband trout subspecies, Oncorhynchus mykiss gairdneri.
