= Lochmuir =

Marks & Spencer salmon brand

Lochmuir is a brand name created by UK retailer Marks & Spencer to help market Scottish farmed salmon. The name was chosen by a panel of consumers as it represented and reinforced the concept that the salmon was from Scotland. The fish is sourced from salmon fish farms in various regions of Scotland. The name brand was launched in mid-2006.

The salmon is farmed at sites around Scotland by supplier Scottish Sea Farms. According to the supplier, it is grown on farms in Scotland, Shetland and Orkney. The salmon are given a unique feed to make them rich in omega-3 fatty acid, and are allowed to grow more slowly than the Norwegian salmon that make up most of the UK supply.
