= Infectious salmon anemia virus =

Virus classification
- (unranked): Virus
- Realm: Riboviria
- Kingdom: Orthornavirae
- Phylum: Negarnaviricota
- Class: Insthoviricetes
- Order: Articulavirales
- Family: Orthomyxoviridae
- Genus: Isavirus
- Species: Isavirus salaris

Synonyms
- Salmon isavirus

Species of virus

Infectious salmon anemia (ISA) is a viral disease of Atlantic salmon (Salmo salar) caused by infectious salmon anemia virus. It affects fish farms in Canada, Norway, Scotland and Chile, causing severe losses to infected farms. ISA has been a World Organisation for Animal Health notifiable disease since 1990. In the EU, it is classified as a non-exotic disease, and is monitored by the European Community Reference Laboratory for Fish Diseases.

== Virology ==
ISA is caused by the infectious salmon anemia virus (ISAV). ISAV, a segmented RNA virus that is the only species in the genus Isavirus, which is in the family Orthomyxoviridae, and therefore related to the influenza viruses.

The genome encodes at least 10 proteins.

There are several distinct strains of the virus. The most common are a European strain and a North American strain.

== Pathology ==
ISA virus causes severe anemia in infected fish. Unlike the mature red blood cells of mammals, the mature red blood cells of fish contain DNA, and can become infected by viruses. The fish develop pale gills, and may swim close to the water surface, gulping for air. However, the fish may show no external signs of illness and maintain a normal appetite, until suddenly dying. The disease can progress slowly throughout an infected farm and, in the worst cases, death rates may approach 100%. Post-mortem examination of the fish has shown a wide range of causes of death. The liver and spleen may be swollen, congested or partially already dead. The circulatory system may stop working, and the blood may be contaminated with dead blood cells. Red blood cells still present burst easily, and the numbers of immature and damaged blood cells are increased.

Infectious salmon anemia appears to be most like influenza viruses. Its mode of transfer and the natural reservoirs of infectious salmon anemia virus are not fully understood. Apart from Atlantic salmon, both sea-run brown trout (Salmo trutta) and rainbow trout (Onchorhyncus mykiss) can be infected, but do not become sick, so it is thought possible that these species may act as notable carriers and reservoirs of the virus.

Research shows that while several species of Pacific salmon can be carriers of the virus, even highly pathogenic strains, Pacific salmon currently show high relative resistance and no ISAV-related symptoms. However, the potential for ISAV adaptation to Pacific salmon exists.

== Epidemiology ==
In the autumn of 1984, a new disease was observed in Atlantic salmon being farmed along the southwest coast of Norway. The disease, which was named infectious salmon anemia, spread slowly, but caused the death of up to 80% of salmon stock in some hatcheries. By June 1988 it had become sufficiently widespread and serious to require the Norwegian Ministry of Agriculture, Fisheries and Food to declare it a notifiable disease.

In the summer of 1996, a new disease appeared in Atlantic salmon being farmed in New Brunswick, Canada. The death rate of the fish on affected farms was very high and, following extensive scientific examination of the victims, the disease was named "hemorrhagic kidney syndrome". Although the source and distribution of this disease was not known, the results of studies by Norwegian and Canadian scientists showed conclusively that the same virus was responsible for both infectious salmon anemia and hemorrhagic kidney syndrome.

In May 1998, a salmon farm at Loch Nevis on the west coast of Scotland reported its suspicions of an outbreak of infectious salmon anemia. The suspicions were confirmed, and by the end of the year, the disease had spread to an additional fifteen farms not only on the Scottish mainland but also on Skye and Shetland.

In 2008, there was an outbreak of ISA in Shetland. ISA was detected in fish from just one site. There is no evidence the disease has spread beyond this site, but two nearby SSF cages are under suspicion of carrying the disease and are also now clear of fish.

In 2011, two wild Pacific salmon taken from the central coast of British Columbia were suspected to have ISA after preliminary tests showed possible evidence of the virus. However, extensive testing by the Canadian Food Inspection Agency to try to amplify and culture the virus were unsuccessful, prompting the agency to conclude that the ISA virus was not present. In February 2012, a confirmed outbreak of ISA in Nova Scotia resulted in the destruction of up to 750,000 salmon. In July 2012, a confirmed outbreak of infectious salmon anemia in Newfoundland and Labrador, Canada, prompted the destruction of 450,000 farmed salmon by the Canadian Food Inspection Agency and an outbreak was also confirmed at another site in late 2012. In mid-2012, another outbreak was identified in Nova Scotia, with the 240,000 fish being allowed by CFIA to mature to market size before being harvested in early 2013 by the operator and processed for the consumer market. After being held by the CFIA, the fish was declared fit for human consumption despite the presence of the virus as the disease "poses no risk to human health". In January 2016, it was announced that the virus had been discovered in farmed and wild salmon British Columbia for the first time.

In Chile, ISA was first isolated from a salmon farm in the 1990s and described for the first time in 2001, although the initial presence never resulted in widespread problems. However, since June 2007, the national industry has been dealing with a serious ISA outbreak which has not yet been completely brought under control and has been responsible for an important decline in the industry, closure of many farms and high unemployment. The virus was detected in an Atlantic salmon farm in Chiloé Archipelago in Los Lagos Region and spread to the fjords and channels of Aysén Region to the south almost immediately.

== Transmission ==
The virus is spread by contact with infected fish or their secretions, or contact with equipment or people who have handled infected fish. The virus can survive in seawater, so a major risk factor for any uninfected farm is its proximity to an already infected farm.

The Lepeophtheirus salmonis sea louse, a small crustacean parasite that attacks the protective mucus, scales and skin of the salmon, can carry the virus passively on its surface and in its digestive tract. Under laboratory conditions Lepeophtheirus salmonis can passively transfer ISA. It is not known whether the ISA virus can reproduce itself in the sea louse, although this is a possibility as viruses can use secondary vectors for transmission, for example Arboviruses such as dengue fever, West Nile virus, or African swine fever virus.

== Diagnosis ==
Clinical signs and pathology may suggest infection. Viral identification is possible using immunofluorescence and PCR.

== Treatment and control ==
There is no treatment once fish are infected.

ISA is a major threat to the viability of salmon farming and is now the first of the diseases classified on List One of the European Commission's fish health regime. Amongst other measures, this requires the total eradication of the entire fish stock should an outbreak of the disease be confirmed on any farm. The economic and social consequences of both the disease and the measures used to control it are thus very far reaching.

Infectious salmon anemia is currently regarded as a serious threat not only to farmed Atlantic salmon, but also to dwindling stocks of wild Atlantic salmon. Recent research involving a multi-year study of wild Atlantic salmon from North America shows that infected salmon that survive infection generate antibodies against the virus. Vaccines for ISA have been developed, and have been shown to decrease the possibility of infection alongside selective breeding and genetic resistance to ISA.

== Evolution ==
There are several distinct strains of the virus, some are pathogenic and some are not. The most common are a European strain and a North American strain.

Genetic research into the ISA virus shows that the European and North American strains of the virus diverged from each other sometime around 1900. This research points out that starting in 1879 when rainbow trout were first brought to Europe from North America, there were many transfers of fish across the Atlantic ocean which may have carried the ISA virus. Some species were introduced to Europe from North America, and some species were introduced to North America from Europe. Given that the virus did not evolve into two separate strains until around 1900, and given how many transfers of fish there were, according to this research, "At present it is therefore not possible to suggest a geographical origin of the ISA virus."

Another study suggests that this virus was introduced into Norway between 1932 and 1959 and that the original strain was the European subtype found in North America. The strains found in Chile were transmitted from Norway between 1995 and 2007.
