= Aquaculture in Canada =

Aquaculture is the farming of fish, shellfish or aquatic plants in either fresh or saltwater, or both. The farmed animals or plants are cared for under a controlled environment to ensure optimum growth, success and profit. When they have reached an appropriate size (often once they reach maturity), they are harvested, processed, and shipped to markets to be sold. Aquaculture is practiced all over the world and is extremely popular in countries such as China, where population is high and fish is a staple part of their everyday diet.

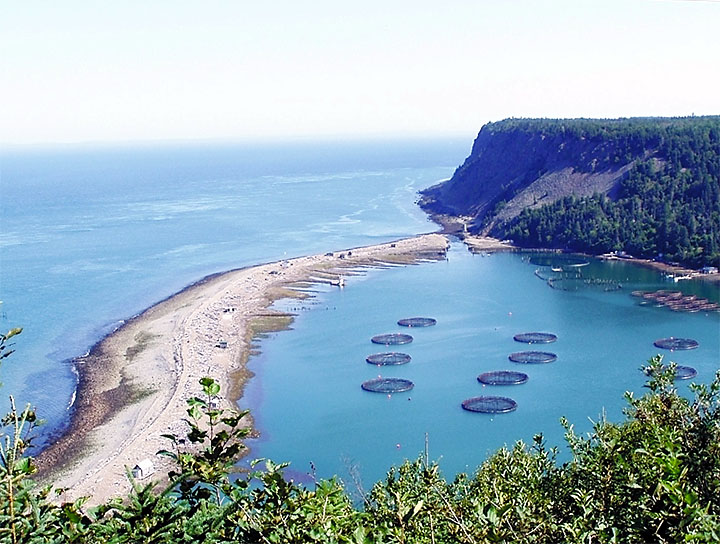
Atlantic salmon holding pens in New Brunswick.

Aquaculture in Canada plays a prominent role in Canada's ecological, social and economic stage. With Canada having the world's longest coastline, as well as the world's largest freshwater system and tidal range, aquaculture is an obvious choice for Canada. The vast range of aquatic organisms farmed in Canadian aquaculture production is beneficial to the industry's attempt to implement ecologically sustainable methods within the major aquaculture stocks of Atlantic Salmon, Arctic Char, Mussels, oysters and Rainbow Trout.

A recent review of literature related to aquaculture in Canada concludes that there is a need for a national strategic plan to increase aquaculture production and to simplify the regulatory framework to reduce uncertainties and delays that have limited growth in the sector, while fostering greater involvement of First Nation communities.

== Economic Value of Aquaculture in Canada ==
Aquaculture provides a notable amount of revenue for the Canadian economy as well as many job opportunities for Canadians. Seafood is Canada's single largest exported food commodity, exporting 85% of production, making Canada the seventh largest seafood exporter in the world. In 1986, Canadian aquaculture production amounted to only 10,488 tonnes, valued at $35 million, and then in 2009 it had a value of $800 million, 69% of which was exported. British Columbia is the fourth largest producer of salmon in the world and is Canada's leader in aquaculture production with 52.3% of total production value, followed by New Brunswick with 20.7% in 2009. The main species of fish farmed in Canada is led by salmon with 70.5% of all fish in aquaculture followed by mussels with 15.1%. Aquaculture makes a significant contribution to Canada's economy totaling $2.1 billion in revenue and jobs in Canada in 2009. The total gross domestic product of farmed fish in Canada totaled $1,005,180,000 in 2009 and $14,495,000 in total employment in Canada. the value accumulated from aquaculture solely for employment is exceptionally important for the members employed in this industry. Over 90% of all jobs (both direct and indirect) are located in rural, coastal, and Aboriginal communities where the human population is low and employment opportunities are scarce. Aquaculture in Canada has proven to revitalize both social and economic factors in these small communities. Over 8,000 Canadians are directly employed in aquaculture – most of them full-time. The aquaculture supply and services sector creates an additional 8,000 jobs. Two-thirds of all workers are under the age of 35.

Output by Province in 2009	Percentage
British Columbia	52.3%
New Brunswick	20.7%
Newfoundland	11.7%
Nova Scotia	7.7%
P.E.I	3.9%
Ontario	1.2%
Prairies	0.7%

Output by Species	Percentage
Salmon	70.5%
Mussels	15.1%
Trout	5.8%
Oysters	5.5%
Other Finfish	1.6%
Clams	1.1%
Other Shellfish	0.4%

== Technology Used in Aquaculture ==
To reduce the environmental impact of aquaculture and especially of salmon farming, researches are being conducted to find alternatives to existing technologies. For the time being the marine net-pens is the only technology that dominates the aquaculture system in Canada. Lately, new alternatives such as closed-containment systems have generated much interest. Culturing fish in a closed environment not only can help fish farmers to better control the rearing conditions but also improve the quality of the fish. Closed containment systems could reduce the environmental impact of the salmon farming industry's current practices. Some of the benefits of these systems are: reduced fish escapes, minimized predator interactions, reduced disease transmission, lower feed inputs, higher stocking densities, and improved waste management capabilities.

=== Conventional net pen or cage aquaculture ===
Canada has been using the net pen system since the 1970s. Net pen, or cage, technology started to be used seriously in Canada in the early 1980s in New Brunswick when joint government /private projects introduced cage technology from Norway. Cage culture started seriously in B.C. in the late 1980s. Smaller scale cage culture developed in freshwaters as well, including Georgian Bay, Ontario and Lake Diefenbaker, Sask. and B.C. The oldest operating cage farm in Canada is actually in Georgian Bay. The conventional net-pen is an open mesh net that is suspended within a framework constructed of steel, wood or plastic, that floats at the surface and held in place by down-haul weights. The arrangement of the cages (net pens) varies considerably. On Canada's east coast typical cages are circular and constructed of high density poly pipe (HDPE). The cages are 60m to 150m in circumference and moored individually within a grid system. On the west coast the cages are often steel with 8 to 24 cages in a group, half on each side of a main walkway. The cages are typically 15m to 30m across and 15m to 30m deep. Natural currents bring fresh, oxygenated water to the net pens and carry away soluble waste. The solid waste fecal material and uneaten feed settle to the ocean bottom near the cage site. Note that the amount of uneaten feed is negligible because the farmers cannot afford to waste feed, which is typically about 60% of their production cost. .

=== Closed-containment systems with rigid walls ===
This system is the first alternative culture system. Named SARGO™ Fin Farm System, the system was established in 1994 for intensive finfish production in both marine and freshwater environment. The system consists of six circular bags that are made of a heavy-gauge plastic installed in a steel frame floating at the surface and held in place by anchors in the same way as the net-pens. Electrical upwelling pumps continuously pump fresh seawater into the bags, and portable liquid oxygen tanks are used to provide oxygen to the cultured fish. A specially designed outlet is used to exit the waste-water and entered the marine environment untreated.

=== Closed-contained systems with flexible walls ===
Closed-contained systems with flexible walls, another alternative technology known as the SEA systems developed by the Future SEA Technologies, consists of flexible round enclosures made out of a waterproof heavy-gauge polyvinyl chloride. These bags are suspended in the water from a flotation system. SEA systems operate on a flow-through basis. Regarding the waste management, Future SEA has also developed a patent, based on a double drain concept to trap the waste. While, clear water is discharged from the upper part of the tank, the waste water is collected from the concentric drain found at the bottom of tank. Even though the Future SEA claims that this waste trap can eliminate 75% of solids, it is still a new technology that needs further testing at commercial scales.

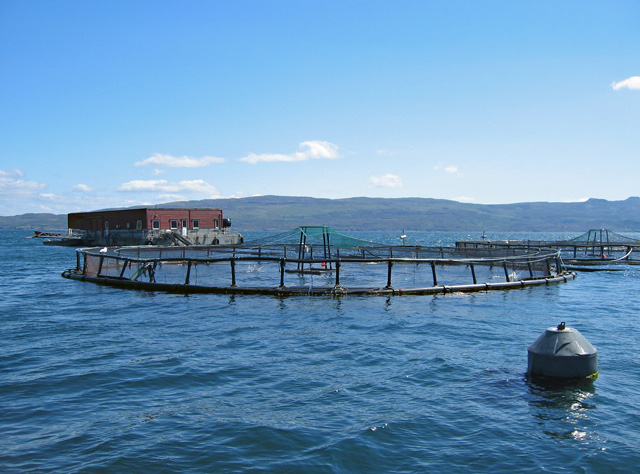
Closed-round net enclosures used for Salmon aquaculture.

=== Land-based technologies ===
The two types of land-based systems are separated based on the type of water in which they operate. Generally, the saltwater land-based systems are temporary rearing technologies for the early stages of growth; with subsequent transition of the livestock to marine environments. This method of aquaculture is often implemented for stocking of wild populations which are under threat. These hatcheries which breed and raise juvenile fish are also utilized in freshwater stocking programs as well.

==== Land-based saltwater flow-through system ====
The land-based saltwater flow-through system is mainly based on the culture of Atlantic salmon. Atlantic salmon is cultured in circular concrete tanks where the fresh seawater is continuously pumped into the tanks from a nearby ocean channel and wastewater piped back into the channel untreated. Like in the floating bag system, portable oxygen tanks provide supplemental oxygen to the fish.

==== Land-based freshwater recirculating system ====
The land-based freshwater recirculating system similar to the saltwater flow-through system consists of a series of circular concrete tanks; however, it is built inside a warehouse. The water is pumped into the tanks from an on-site freshwater well, and almost 99% of the water is recirculated back into system through a mechanical and bio-filtration process. The solid waste is collected in a holding tank to be used as fertilizer for plants. Four operations in Canada are now in commercial operation - West Creek Aquaculture in BC, Namgis in northern Vancouver Island, Watersong Farms in Manitoba, and Sustainable Blue in Nova Scotia.

== Environmental Impacts of Aquaculture ==
A significant issue that many aquaculture operations are faced with, particularly in marine environments, is accidental interactions between farmed fish and the surrounding natural ecosystem. There are many potential issues which can result in farmed fish interacting with wild. Various means of equipment failure can lead to farmed fish escaping their pens and dispersing into the wild:

- infrastructure failure (e.g. a result of extreme weather damage)
- boat operations (e.g. collisions and propeller damage)
- predation (e.g. seals, sea lions)
- vandalism
- fish handling errors
- technical deficiencies (inadequate or damaged parts in cage systems)

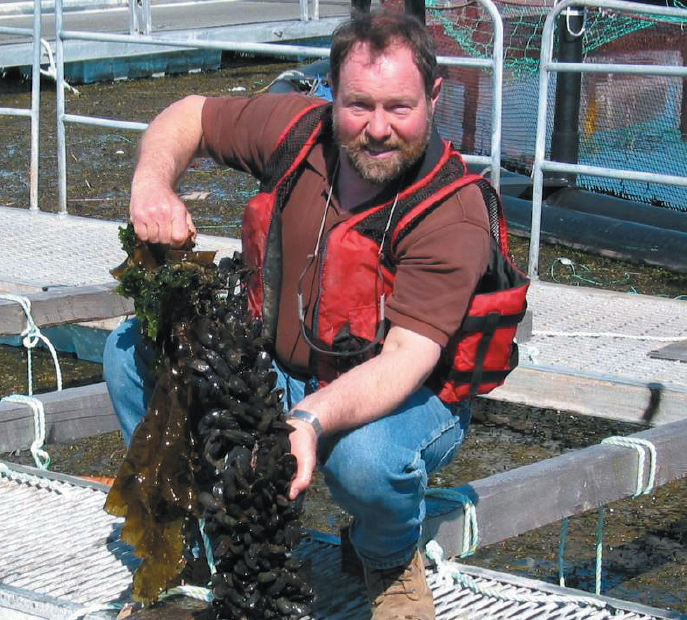
Mussels reared using IMTA practices in the Bay of Fundy.

When farmed salmon escapes into the wild, interbreeding between wild and farmed salmon can occur if they are the same species. This may result in a decrease of genetic diversity of wild salmon in areas where the original genetic stocks of salmon still exist. In B.C. most of the salmon aquaculture is Atlantic salmon which are not only a different species from all of the native salmon, but a different genus and interbreeding is biologically impossible. Any escaped salmon in B.C. are reported to the provincial ministry of agriculture. The introduction of sterile Atlantic Salmon into aquaculture practices has begun to be adopted within Canada's aquaculture industry after a study conduction by the Department of Fisheries and Oceans. Triploid fish is genetically modified organism which instead of having two chrosomosomes, it has three, this renders it incapable of reproduction. This technique of raising sterile fish in aquaculture prevents any breeding with wild populations if an enclosure was to fail, releasing them into the wild environment. The introduction and persistence of sea lice within marine net pens of Salmonids is a severe issue in late summer during just before wild populations begin to spawn. As the wild populations migrate back to their spawning grounds they often come into indirect contact with farmed fish while passing by the net pens. The close proximity which these populations interact are when sea lice are transmitted to the farmed populations. As the fish are trapped close to one another transmission of the parasite is rampant and unavoidable. These infestation of sea lice is often only deleterious to juvenile fish. The farmers prevent this from happening by using approved therapeutants to control the sea lice numbers.

With high densities of farmed fish within net pens, there are high concentrations of waste products beneath their pens. Fish waste is high in the nutrients, nitrogen (N) and phosphorus (P), which in high concentrations can be detrimental to farmed and natural life. There are several diets which some aquaculture practices follow to limit these two inputs into the environment. The use of Integrate Multi-Trophic Aquaculture (IMTA) methods are also useful for mitigating the build up of these nutrients. IMTA is based on the natural aquatic food web, the concept involves various types of organisms which are commonly farmed in aquaculture. The concept minimizes waste and need for chemical supplements, instead it uses the waste produced by finfish which is absorbed and consumed by shellfish and marine macrophytes. IMTA is also an organic method of decreasing dangerous algal blooms which are caused by high concentrations of N and P.
