= Green Warriors of Norway =

Norwegian environmental organization

- Company type: NGO
- Industry: Environmentalism
- Founded: 1993
- Headquarters: Bergen, Norway
- Area served: Norway
- Key people: Ruben Oddekalv (interim chairman)
- Website: https://nmf.no

Green Warriors of Norway (Norwegian: Norges Miljøvernforbund, NMF) is a Norwegian environmental NGO based in Bergen, Norway. The organization also has offices in Oslo and Tromsø.

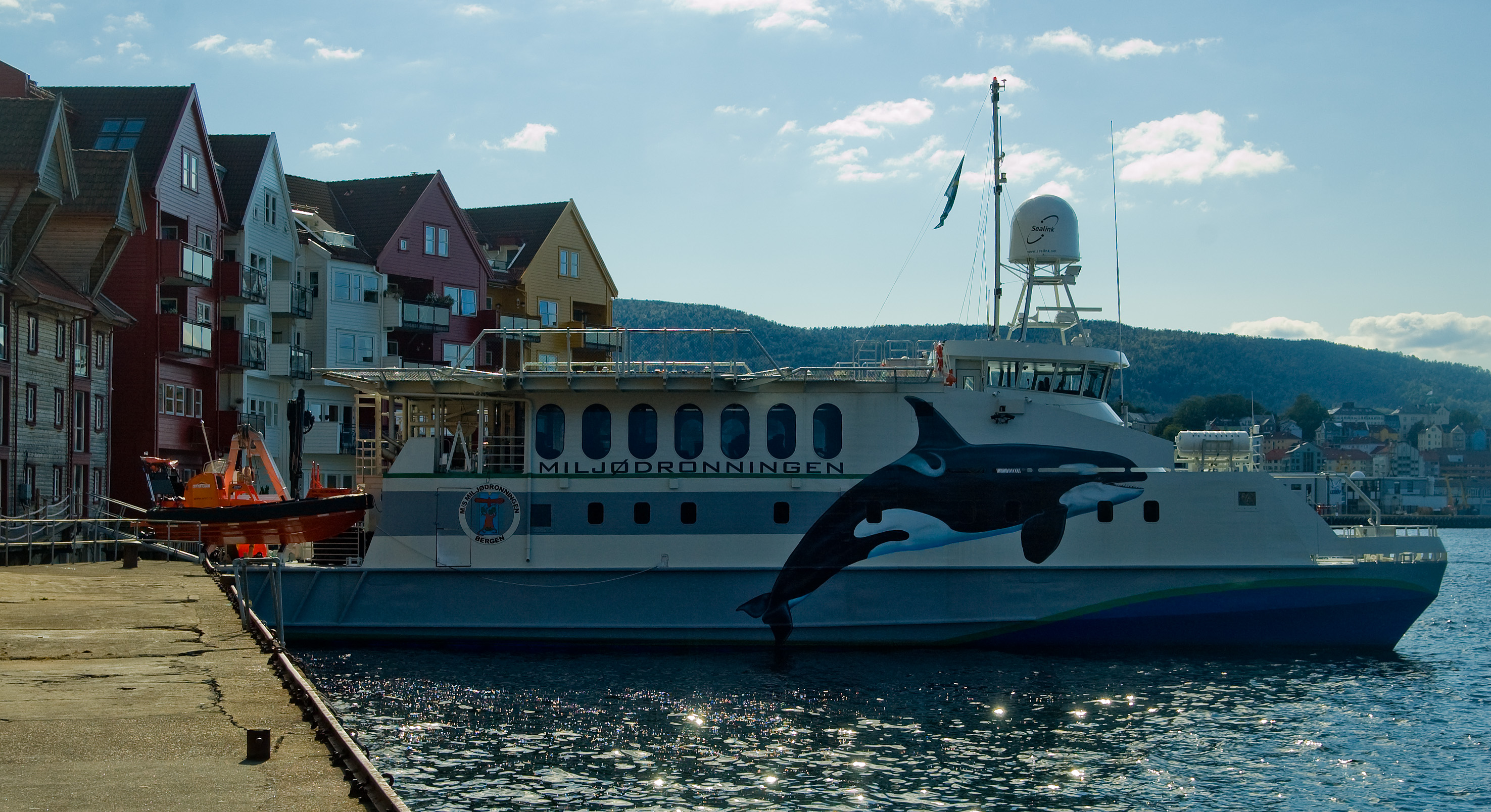
MS Miljødronningen

The organization was led by environmentalist Kurt Oddekalv up until his death in 2021, who founded the organization due to a dispute with Norwegian Society for the Conservation of Nature from which he later was excluded. The organization operates mainly on local level. It also engages in some general environmental-related work on the national and international level. The topics that NMF work on are environmental issues, youth issues, and protection of buildings and indigenous peoples.

Green Warriors of Norway has received substantial funding from Bergen based philanthropist, Trond Mohn. The organization is involved in a number of commercial enterprises, including publishing and real estate. It also operates the conference catamaran MS Miljødronningen.
