= EWOS =

Farmed fish food supplier

- Type: Food supplier
- Industry: Fish farming
- Founded: 1931
- Founder: Erik Berggren, Victor Weyde and Olle Sjöstedt
- Headquarters: Bergen, Hordaland, Norway
- Number of locations: Norway, Canada, Scotland, Chile and Vietnam
- Products: Food and nutrition for farmed fish
- Owner: Cargill
- Number of employees: 400 (2026)
- Divisions: Several (read more)
- Website: Homepage

EWOS or EWOS Group, was then one of the world's largest suppliers of feed and nutrition for farmed fish. Former EWOS companies operate in Canada, Chile, Norway, Scotland and Vietnam as part of Cargill Animal Nutrition, CAN.

The company, which was created in 1931, was bought by Cargill in 2015. It started in Södertälje, Sweden, in THE premises of Astra (now Astra Seneca). Beside animal Good it Aldo produced agrochemical products and Helosan creme

== History ==
EWOS was established in 1931 by Erik Berggren, Victor Weyde and Olle Sjöstedt, names from which the acronym derives. In the beginning the production volumes were low, but from 1980 and onwards, the average annual growth rate has been 18%. In 2010, EWOS provided feed and nutrition for 28 different fish species with salmon as the major species

== Enterprise ==
At the time of Cargill's acquisition, EWOS Group consisted of subsidiary companies in five countries, as well as an R&D company. The five were:

- EWOS AS – Located in Norway. EWOS’ head office is located in Bergen.
- EWOS Ltd. – Located in Westfield, near Edinburgh, Scotland
- EWOS Canada Ltd. – Located near Vancouver, British Columbia, Canada
- EWOS Chile SA – Located in Chile
- EWOS Innovation – EWOS’ research and development Company located in Chile and Norway

In 2010 EWOS entered the market in Vietnam, selling feed for the white fish pangasius and other species such as snakehead.
