= Kurt Oddekalv =

Norwegian environmentalist (1957–2021)

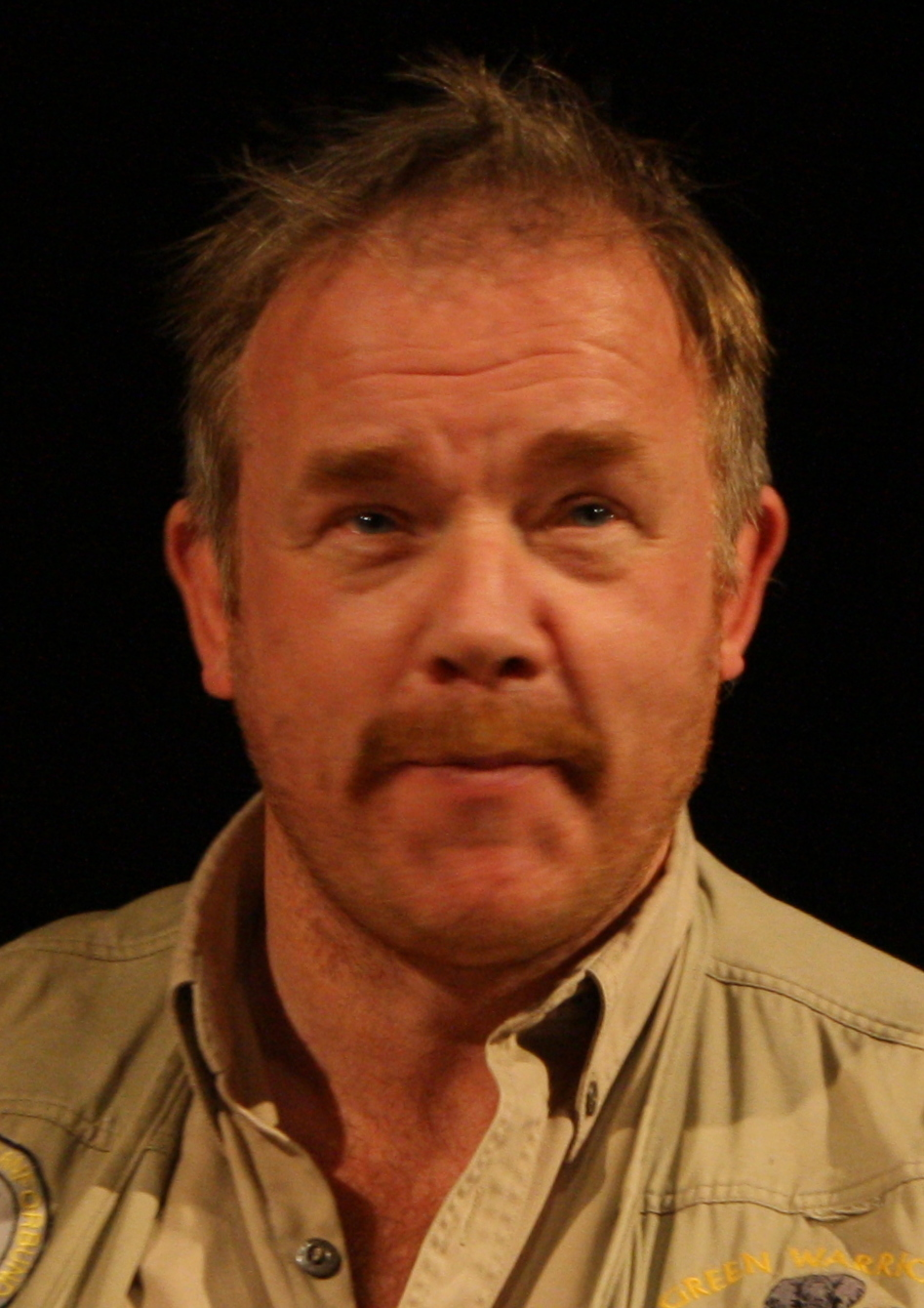
- Oddekalv at Røros-konferansen 2010
- Born: Kurt Willy Oddekalv; 27 July 1957; Senja, Norway
- Died: 11 January 2021 (aged 63); Bahusvatnet outside Bergen, Norway
- Occupation: Environmentalist

Kurt Willy Oddekalv (27 July 1957 – 11 January 2021) was a Norwegian environmentalist.

== Career ==
He was excluded from Norwegian Society for the Conservation of Nature after a vote at the Annual gathering meeting in 1993. As a result of this he created his own environmental organization Green Warriors of Norway of which he was the leader until his death.

Oddekalv was the leader of Norges Miljøvernforbund (Norway's Environment Association), and wanted to persecute Sámi reindeer herders on grounds of allowing a number of reindeer to die during the intense winter of 1996–1997. He stated that it was a myth that the Sámi were living harmoniously with nature, but instead that they were destroying the tundra of Finnmark. These claims were used to justify governmental and political initiatives to limit the indigenous peoples' reindeer herding activities.

Oddekalv revealed in 2015 that he believed in chemtrails, a conspiracy theory that has been strongly criticized by skeptics.

== Personal life ==
In later years, Oddekalv suffered several strokes and gradually withdrew from the mainstream media. He died on 11 January 2021 after falling through the ice near his home, when trying to rescue his daughter's dog. He was 63 years old.
