= Bacterial kidney disease =

Fish disease

Bacterial kidney disease (BKD, also known as white boil disease) is a systemic infection caused by the bacterium Renibacterium salmoninarum. The disease affects populations of wild salmonid. BKD was originally discovered in the Scottish rivers of Dee and Spey in 1933.
