= Renibacterium salmoninarum =

Scientific classification
- Domain: Bacteria
- Kingdom: Bacillati
- Phylum: Actinomycetota
- Class: Actinomycetes
- Order: Micrococcales
- Family: Micrococcaceae
- Genus: Renibacterium; Sanders and Fryer 1980
- Species: R. salmoninarum

Binomial name
- Renibacterium salmoninarum Sanders and Fryer 1980

Type strain
- TCC 33209; CIP 103036; DSM 20767; IFO 15589; JCM 11484; Lea-1-74; LMG 10846; NBRC 15589

Species of bacterium

Renibacterium salmoninarum is a member of the Micrococcaceae family. It is a Gram-positive, intracellular bacterium that causes disease in young salmonid fish. The infection is most commonly known as "bacterial kidney disease" but may also be referred to as BKD, White Boil Disease, Dee Disease, Salmonid Kidney Disease and Corynebacterial Kidney Disease. It is of significant ecologic importance due to its effect on both farmed and wild salmonids. The disease is found in North America, Europe, Japan, Chile and Scandinavia, and is spread both vertically and horizontally. Pacific salmon appear to be the most susceptible to the disease.

== Clinical signs ==
The severity of clinical signs is very variable. There may be no outward clinical signs, or fish may show signs of lethargy and anaemia. Haemorrhagic skin lesions and exophthalmos may develop.

On postmortem examination there are normally signs of necrosis and granulomatous inflammation on the internal organs, especially the kidney.

A diagnosis cannot be made based on clinical signs, instead laboratory tests such as specialised bacterial culture, ELISA, PCR and fluorescent antibody testing are necessary to identify the bacteria. Ideally more than one test should be used to confirm diagnosis.

== Treatment and control ==
Oral or injectable antibiotics can be used to treat the infection. Intraperitoneal vaccination can also be used to treat fish in an outbreak.
