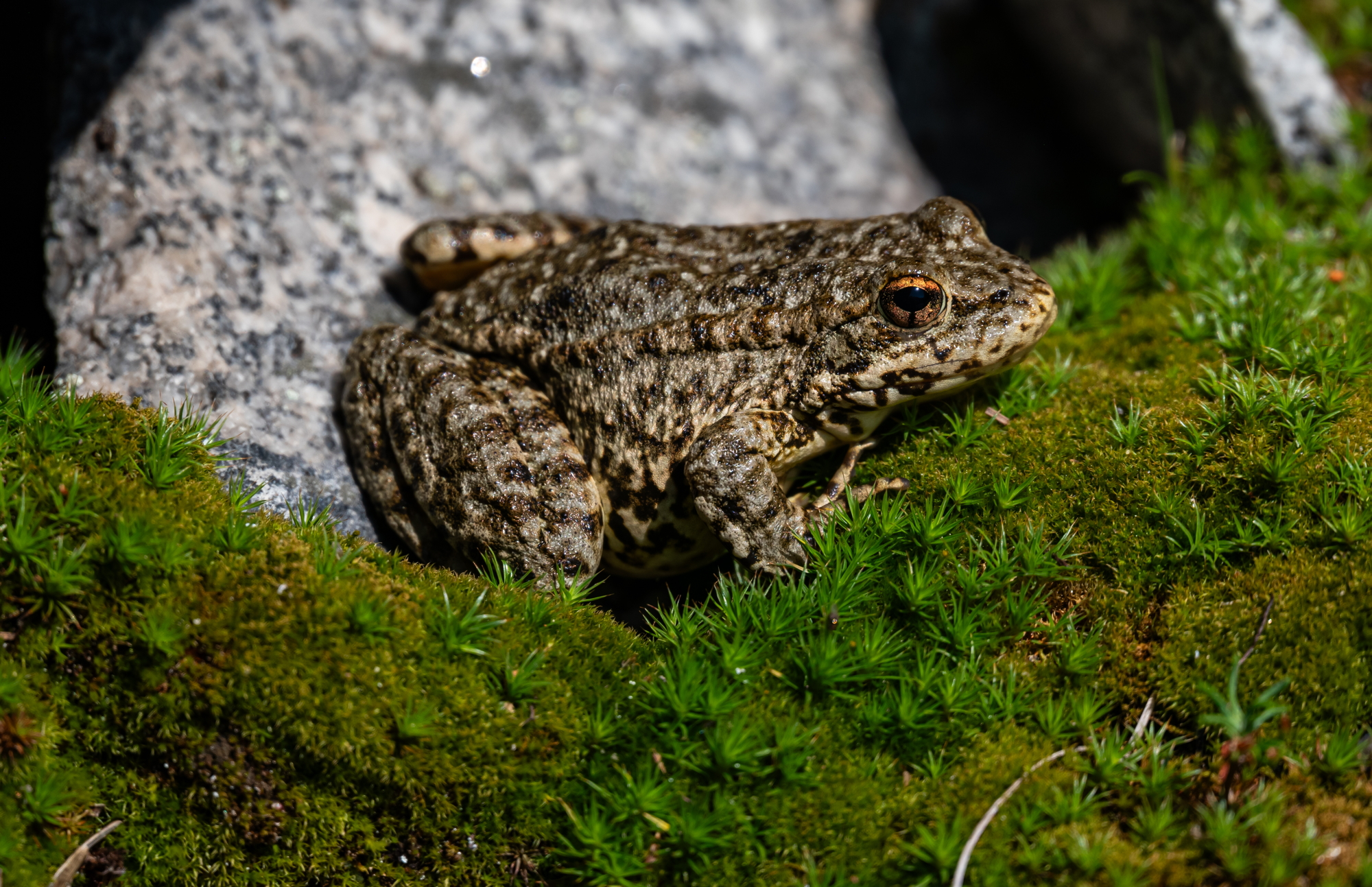

Conservation status
- Vulnerable (IUCN 3.1)

- Endangered (ESA)

Scientific classification
- Kingdom: Animalia
- Phylum: Chordata
- Class: Amphibia
- Order: Anura
- Family: Ranidae
- Genus: Rana
- Species: R. sierrae

Binomial name
- Rana sierrae Camp, 1917
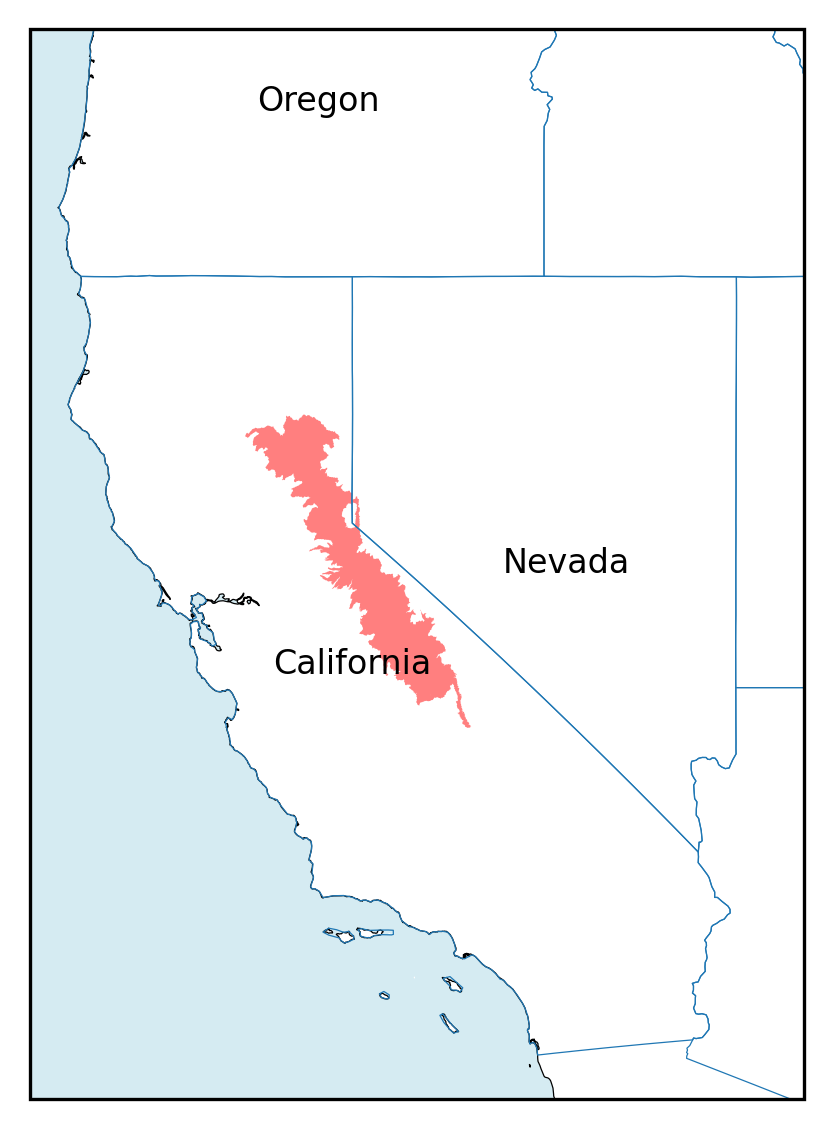

= Sierra Nevada yellow-legged frog =

Species of amphibian

The Sierra Nevada yellow-legged frog (Rana sierrae) is a true frog endemic to the Sierra Nevada of California and Nevada in the United States. R. sierrae was formerly considered R. muscosa, until a 2007 study identified populations north of the Middle Fork Kings River (north of the Monarch Divide and Mather Pass in Kings Canyon National Park) as R. sierrae, with R. muscosa then confined to the southern Sierra Nevada, south of the Middle Fork Kings River and west of the Sierra Crest, and within the transverse ranges of southern California.

Once abundant in the Sierra Nevada, some estimates suggest populations of R. sierrae have declined over 90% (although other agency estimates suggest the declines for R. sierrae may have been around 70%, when comparing historic vs occupied localities, as of 2011). The potential ecological effects of these declines are not fully known, but the species was once highly abundant in the Sierra Nevada, and is therefore likely important for nutrient and energy cycling in alpine aquatic and terrestrial ecosystems.

Despite historic declines, long term monitoring work in Yosemite National Park suggests a trend toward recovery, in part due to cessation of fish stocking in remote wilderness areas and physical removal of non-native trout, plus reduced susceptibility over time among some populations to the fungal pathogen Batrachochytrium dendrobatidis (Bd), which causes the amphibian disease chytridiomycosis. This research found an overall sevenfold increase in abundance of R. sierrae in Yosemite during the ~20-year study period (an 11% per year increase). Additionally, direct management actions, including translocation of adult frogs from populations that are persisting with Bd, and captive-rearing at zoos, have shown great promise for helping recover these imperiled populations.

== Description ==
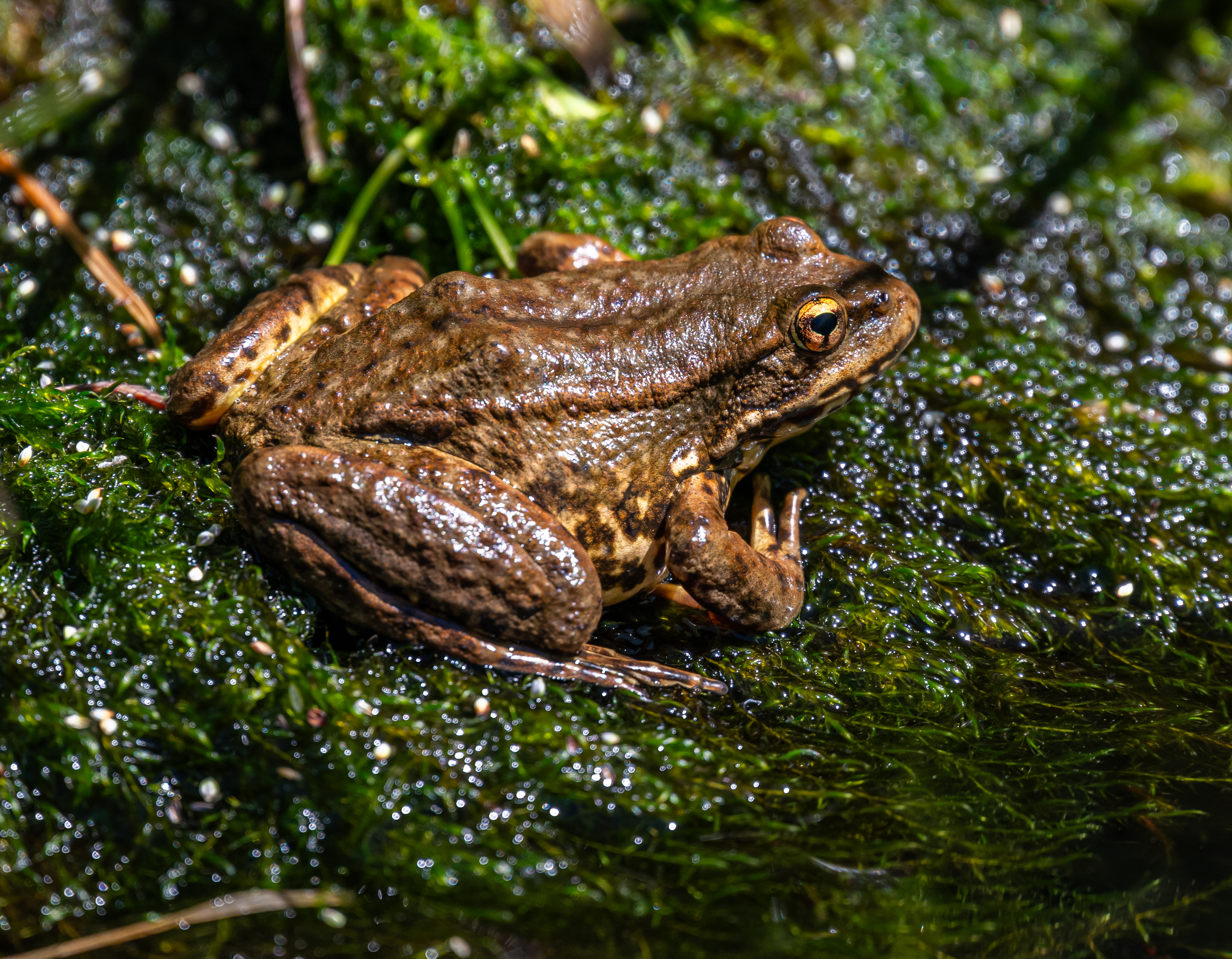
An adult Sierra Nevada yellow-legged frog (Rana sierrae), sitting next to a stream in the northern Sierra Nevada.

The Sierra Nevada yellow-legged frog is one of two species (along with the southern mountain yellow-legged frog, Rana muscosa) that make up the "mountain yellow-legged frog species complex." The Sierra Nevada yellow-legged frog is very similar in appearance to the southern mountain yellow-legged frog. The two were separated into different species by examining mitochondrial DNA, and subtle differences in morphology and breeding calls. R. sierrae is highly aquatic and normally found within a few meters of water.

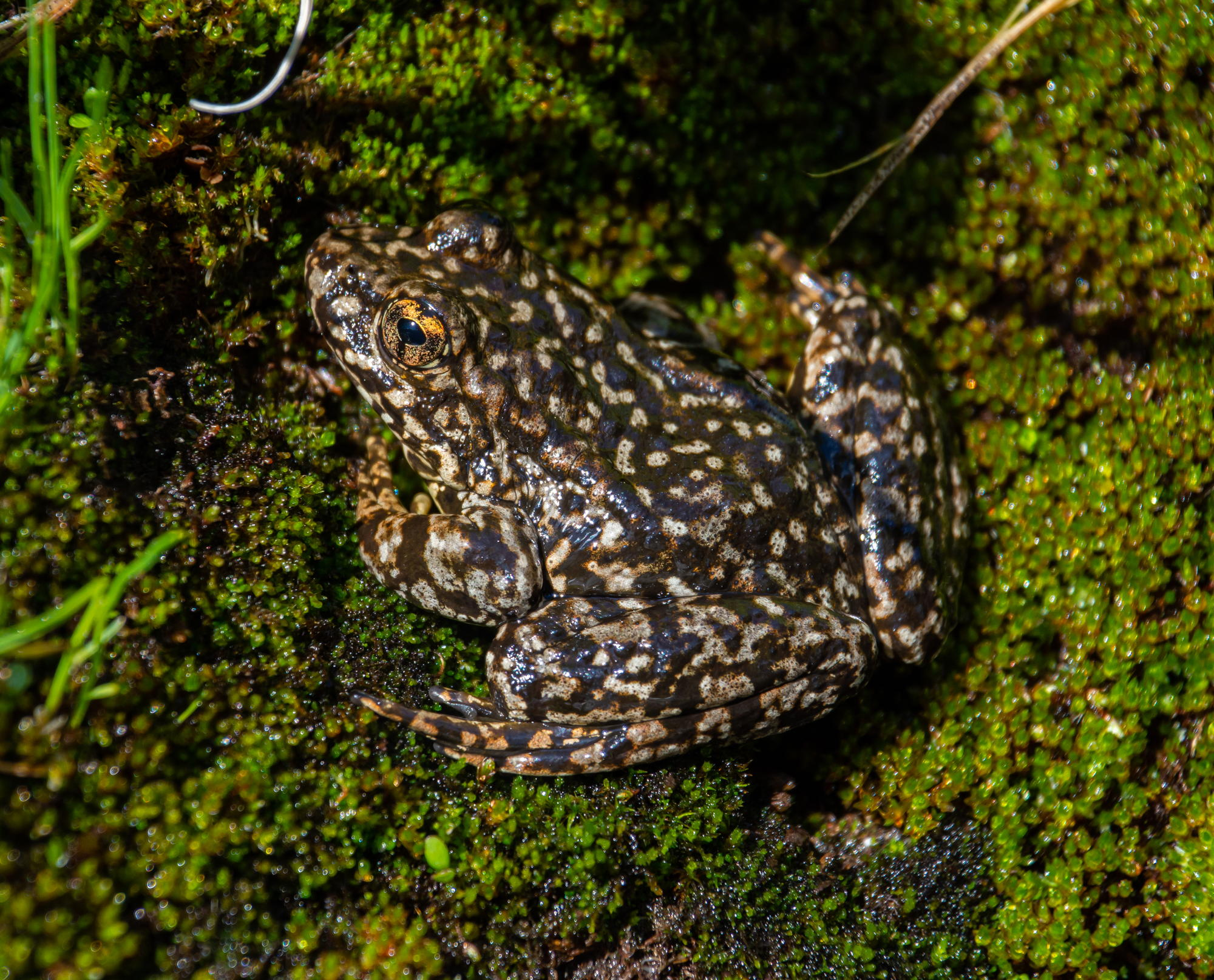
An adult Rana sierrae from Desolation Wilderness, Eldorado County, California, USA.

The frogs are often olive, brownish, or yellowish above with varying amounts of black or brown markings, often with dark spots or bands. Yellow or light orange coloration can be present on much of the ventral side (including the chin), but the coloration is most often present on the underside of their legs, lower abdomen, groin, and sometimes up onto the flanks, although not all individuals possess distinct ventral yellow coloration.

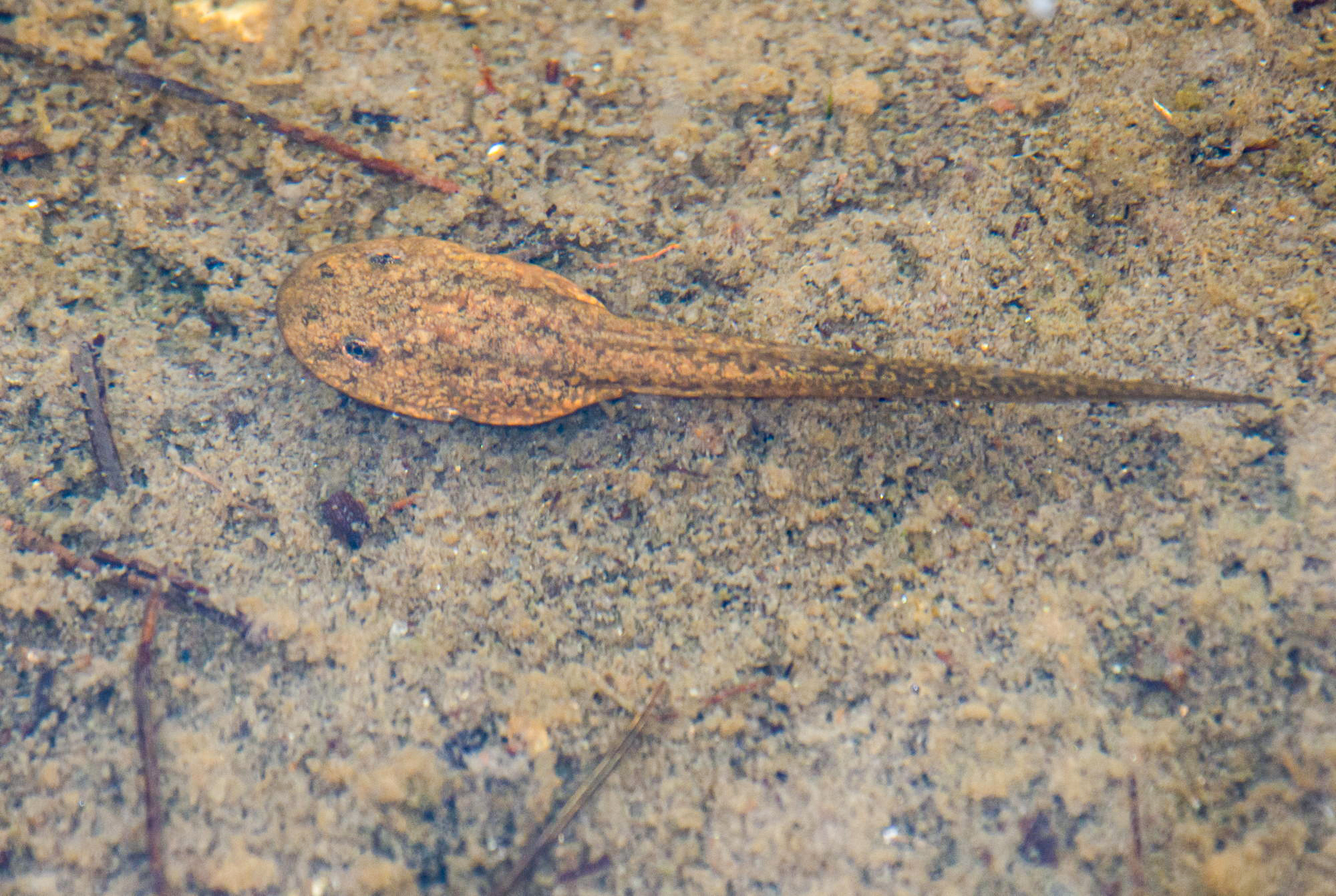
A Rana sierrae tadpole.

Tadpoles of R. sierrae appear black or brown, and vary from around a centimeter soon after hatching, up to approximately 75 mm total length before metamorphosis, which may take several years in higher elevation populations. Females generally grow up to 3.4 inches (87 mm) snout vent length (SVL) and males grow up to about 2.7 inches (68 mm) SVL. R. sierrae lack prominent vocal sacs, however, they vocalize by making short, muffled croaks, groans, and squawks. R. sierrae hibernate during the winter, staying submerged in and around lakes, ponds, and deep stream pools. R. sierrae may only be active for around three months per year at the highest elevation populations, depending on climatic conditions, but lower elevation populations are often active for at least six months each year. If disturbed, R. sierrae can produce skin secretions that have a musky, garlic-like odor.

== Life cycle and Reproduction ==
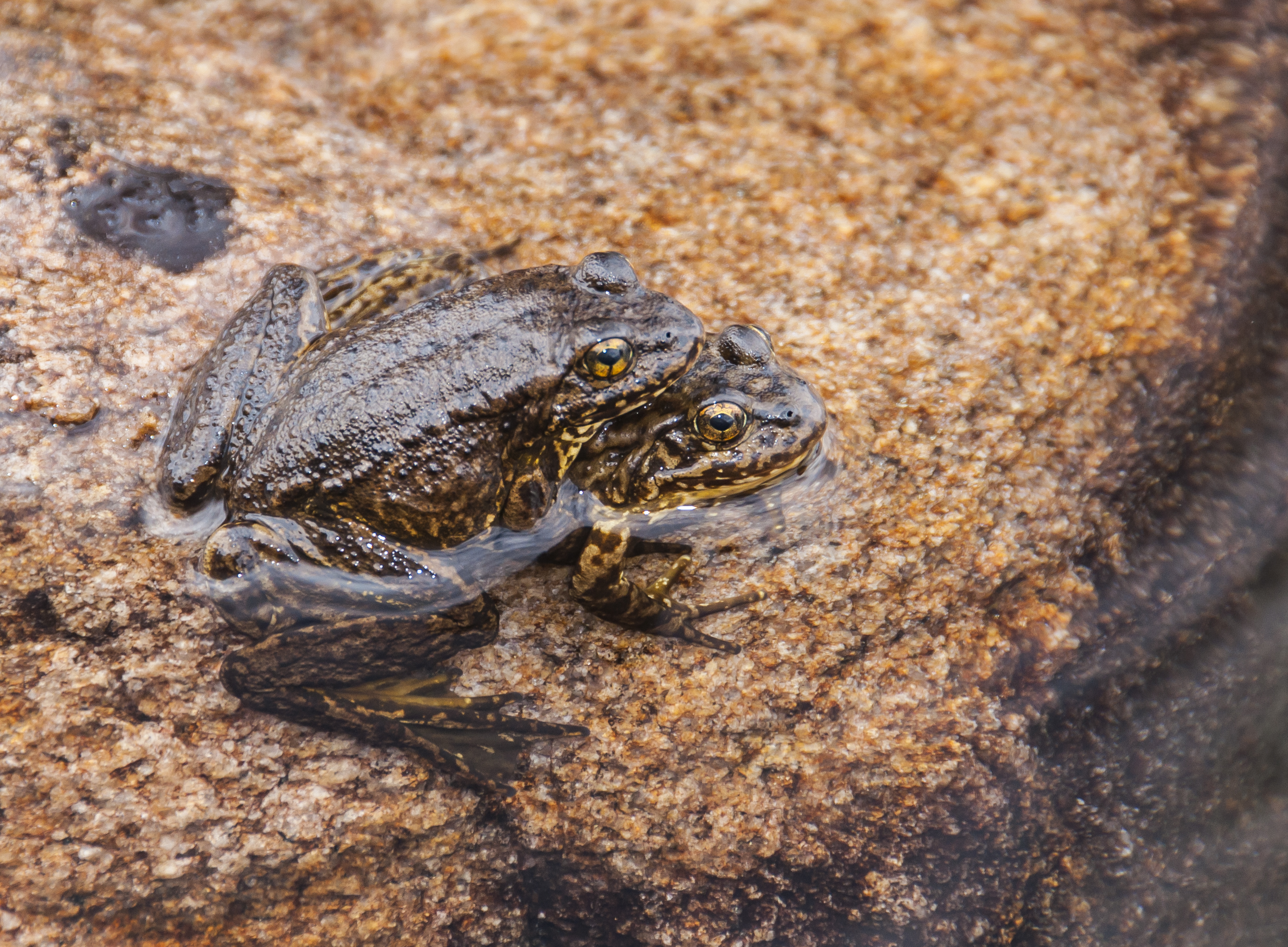
A pair of Rana sierrae in amplexus.

Breeding for R. sierrae typically starts soon after snowmelt in spring or early summer, but timing varies, depending on elevation, water year, and local conditions of the area (usually between April and August). During the breeding season, adult male frogs will call for a mate (usually within or underwater) and upon the arrival of a female, the male will grasp the female's back (in a position known as amplexus) and externally fertilize as the female releases eggs.

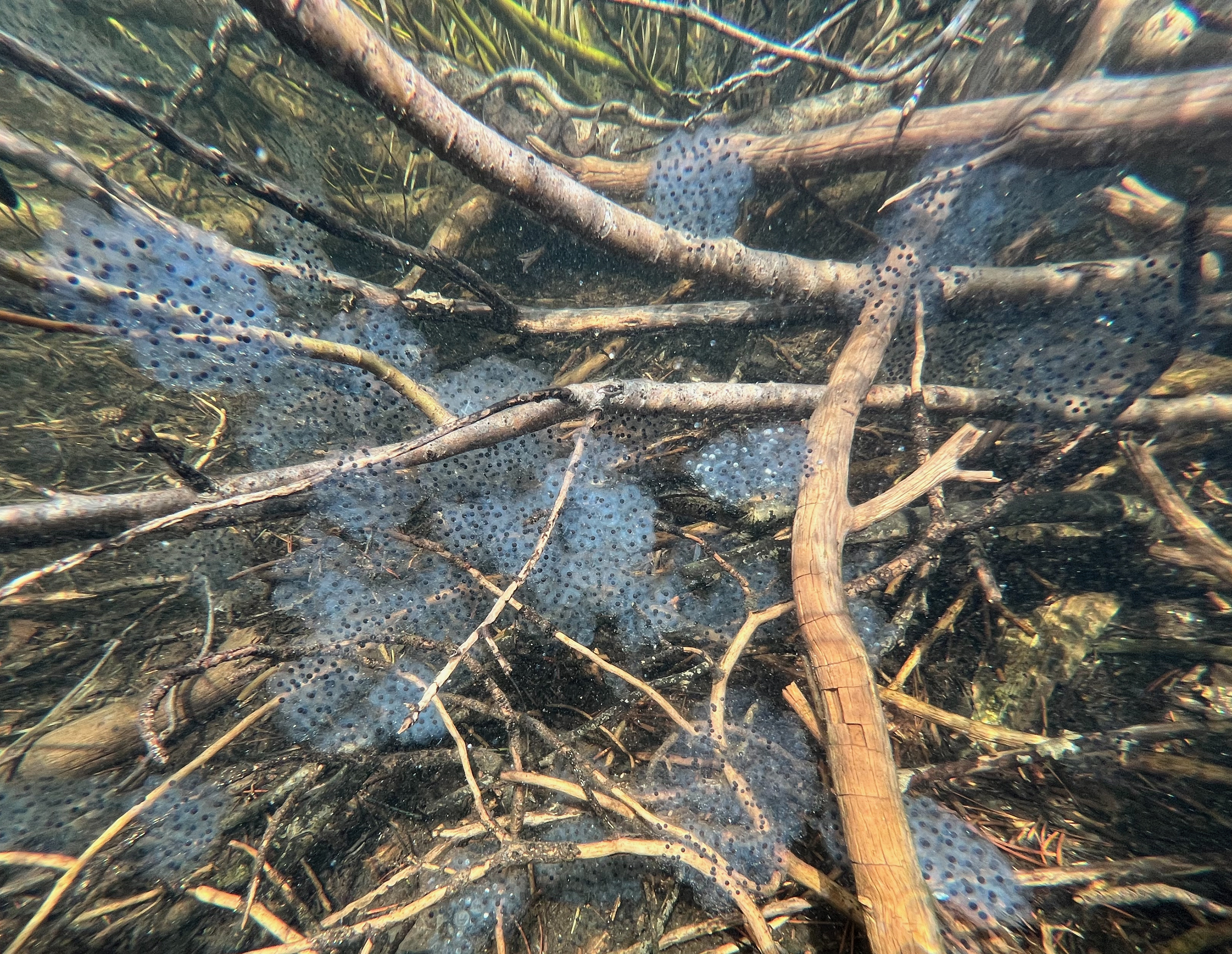
Numerous Rana sierrae egg masses attached to submerged vegetation at the margin of a mountain lake in the northern Sierra Nevada.

Eggs are laid in masses underwater, often attached to rocks, submerged vegetation, or beneath undercut banks. Eggs are typically laid in fishless habitats where water is deep enough to not freeze entirely overwinter. (Overwinter mortality, due to freezing of shallow habitats and anoxic conditions, has been reported.) Egg masses have been estimated to contain between 100 and 350 eggs. The eggs will then hatch in about 15–20 days.

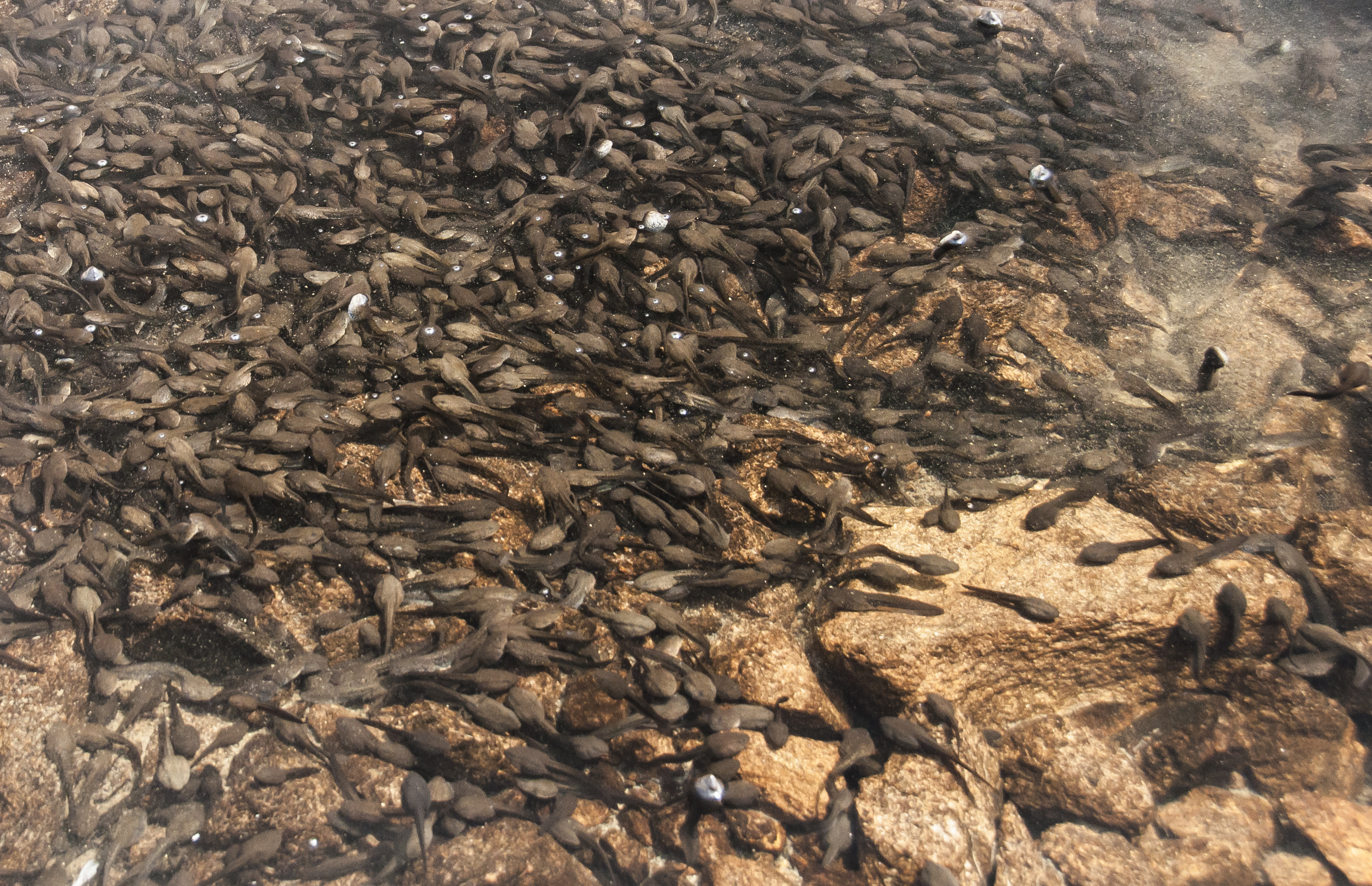
A large congregation of Rana sierrae tadpoles in the littoral zone of an alpine lake in Kings Canyon National Park.

Larvae will then develop into adult frogs over a period ranging from one to four years, depending on the elevation, weather, and local conditions.

== Habitat and Range ==
R. sierrae inhabit lakes, ponds, streams, flooded meadows, and other wetland habitats, from about 4,500 feet up to 12,000 feet in elevation. The species spends most of its life in or around these water sources, which provide foraging, breeding, and overwintering habitat. The species is found primarily from Kings Canyon National Park and surrounding National Forest Lands up through Plumas County, in the northern Sierra Nevada. Although overall population densities for R. sierrae have declined when compared with historic distributions (particularly at the northern extent of the species' range), the species is showing positive signs of recovery in some locations.

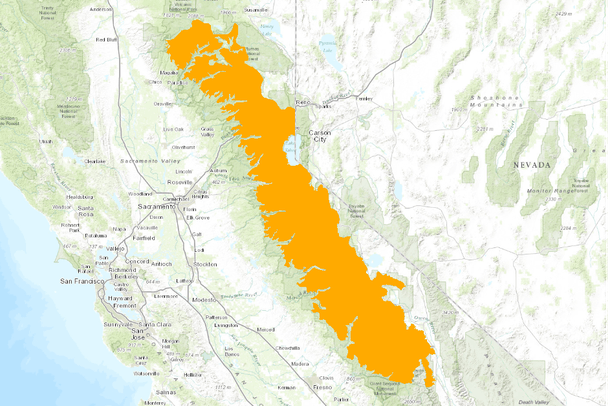
Sierra Nevada yellow-legged frog range

Adults can be found basking on aquatic habitat features (rocks, logs, shorelines), resting near shore with their head protruding from shallow water, hiding (e.g., in crevices, beneath undercut banks, under overhanging logs, within low shoreline vegetation), or sitting on the bottom of lakes and streams. Larvae often congregate (sometimes in dense clusters within larger populations) in warm, shallow areas of water.

== Conservation Status ==
Sierra Nevada yellow-legged frogs are listed as endangered under the federal Endangered Species Act (ESA) and the species is also currently listed as threatened under the California Endangered Species Act (CESA). Additionally, R. sierrae have been declared vulnerable by the IUCN. Some researchers have estimated that up to 92.5% of mountain yellow-legged frog populations (R. muscosa and R. sierrae) may have been extirpated when compared with historic occupancy. These declines have been primarily caused by disease and non-native trout, but other perturbations, such as pesticide exposure, cattle crazing in breeding habitats, habitat loss, and other factors may play a role in local declines. Due to long-term historic non-native fish stocking, many populations have been relegated to smaller, shallower lakes and fishless streams, some of which dry completely by late summer. Predation by non-native trout also plays a large role in limiting breeding and tadpole development. Trout can eat tadpoles, while also competing with adult frogs for resources (although larger trout can also consume post-metamorphic frogs, and these instances of predation have been noted: “The stomach of one trout, 9.8 inches long, from Bright Dot Lake, contained an adult Sierra Nevada yellow-legged frog (Rana boylii sierrae). On September 10, 1937, an occasional trout was seen pursued by others, swimming toward deeper water with one of these frogs held crosswise in its month, attempting to swallow it.” - Needham and Vestal 1938, Pg. 278). Areas containing trout have seen major declines in R. sierrae populations and experiments have shown that the removal of trout often leads to recovery of R. sierrae populations.

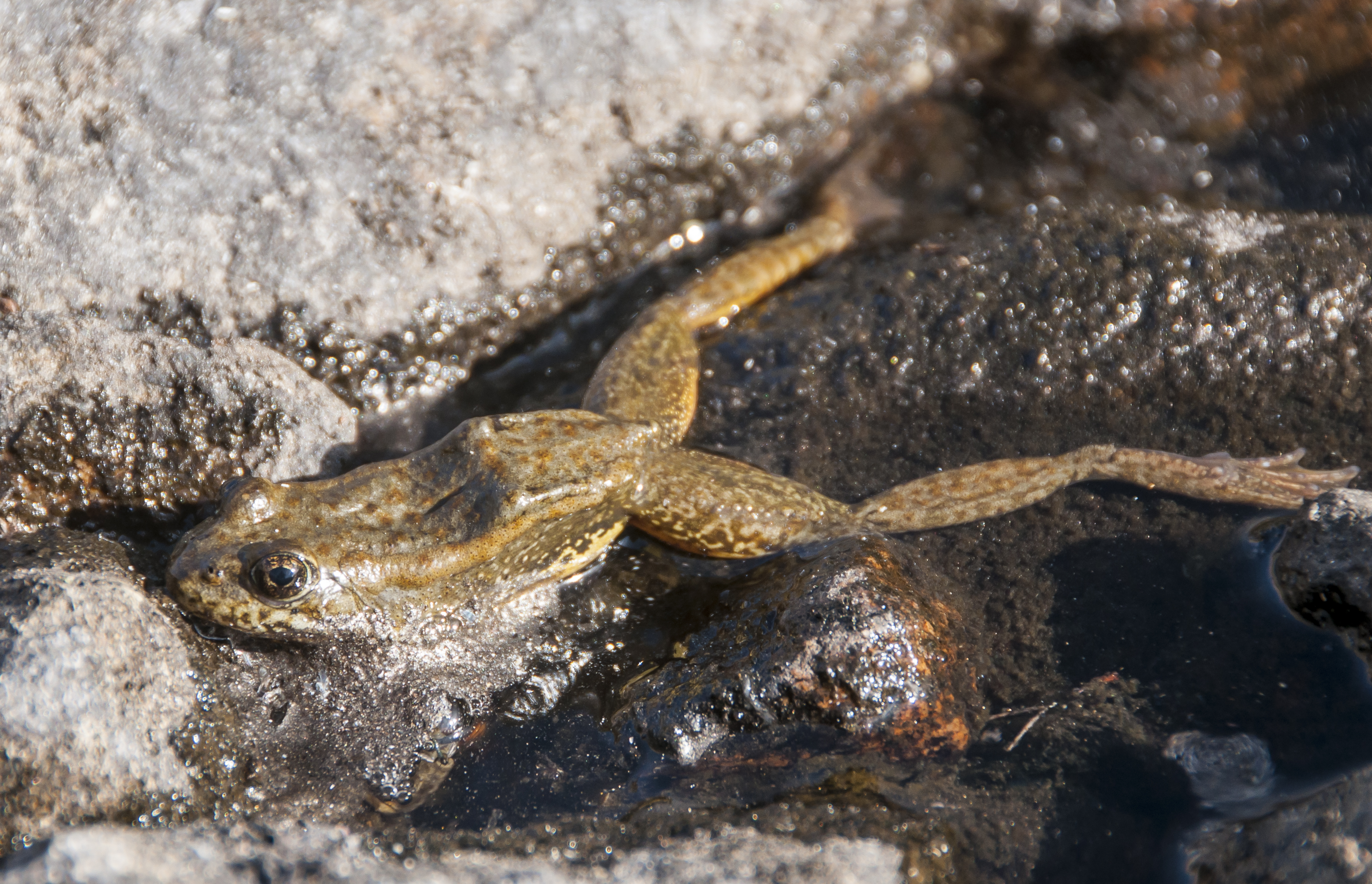
An adult Rana sierrae with a severe case of chytridiomycosis, an amphibian disease caused by the fungal pathogen Batrachochytrium dendrobatidis.

The disease chytridiomycosis has led to the loss of many R. sierrae populations. When the disease first arrives at a population naïve to the disease, the population is often extirpated or reduced to a few individuals. Therefore, given the combined effects of non-native fish and disease, many remaining R. sierrae populations suffer from genetic isolation and low genetic diversity. Widespread declines have isolated many remaining populations, and even populations that have subsequently recovered in the absence of introduced trout have often gone through bottlenecks, where only a small population remained prior to recovery. These small populations likely have low effective population sizes, leading to concerns about long term population viability. For these reasons, researchers and managers have begun undertaking reintroductions and population supplementations using multiple donor populations to help increase genetic diversity.

=== Conservation Strategy ===
There is a multi-agency conservation strategy for R. sierrae and R. muscosa, the current version of which was published in November 2018. Signatories of the strategy include the U.S. Fish and Wildlife Service, U.S. Forest Service, National Park Service, and California Department of Fish and Wildlife.
