= Introduced trout in lake ecosystems =

Since the recession of the last glaciation, isolated bodies of water high in mountain crevasses have been topographically separated from fish. Within Washington state a number of lakes in the Olympic and Cascade Mountains have been stocked since the early 20th century. Prior to the existence of a state wildlife management agency, the U.S. Forest Service stocked mountain lakes with rainbow trout (Oncorhynchus mykiss), cutthroat trout (Oncohynchus clarki) and eastern brook trout (Salvelinus fontinalis). High lake management of this era largely focused on improving sport fishing opportunities and secondarily establishing ecological balance. Natural reproduction of fish species, especially eastern brook trout, has led to overpopulation and “stunting” from starvation in low nutrient environments. The result has been decreased interest from fishermen, while causing large, negative impacts on natural lake biota. Addressing concerns for biodiversity can positively impact agendas for the conservation of species, as well as high lakes fishery management.

== Impacts on lake species via competition or predation ==
While not all lakes experience excessive natural reproduction, the presence of trout may be a factor in the decline of commonly found biota in these mountain lake settings. The introduced trout replace top predators in otherwise fishless lakes and alter top-down food chains.

=== Salamanders ===
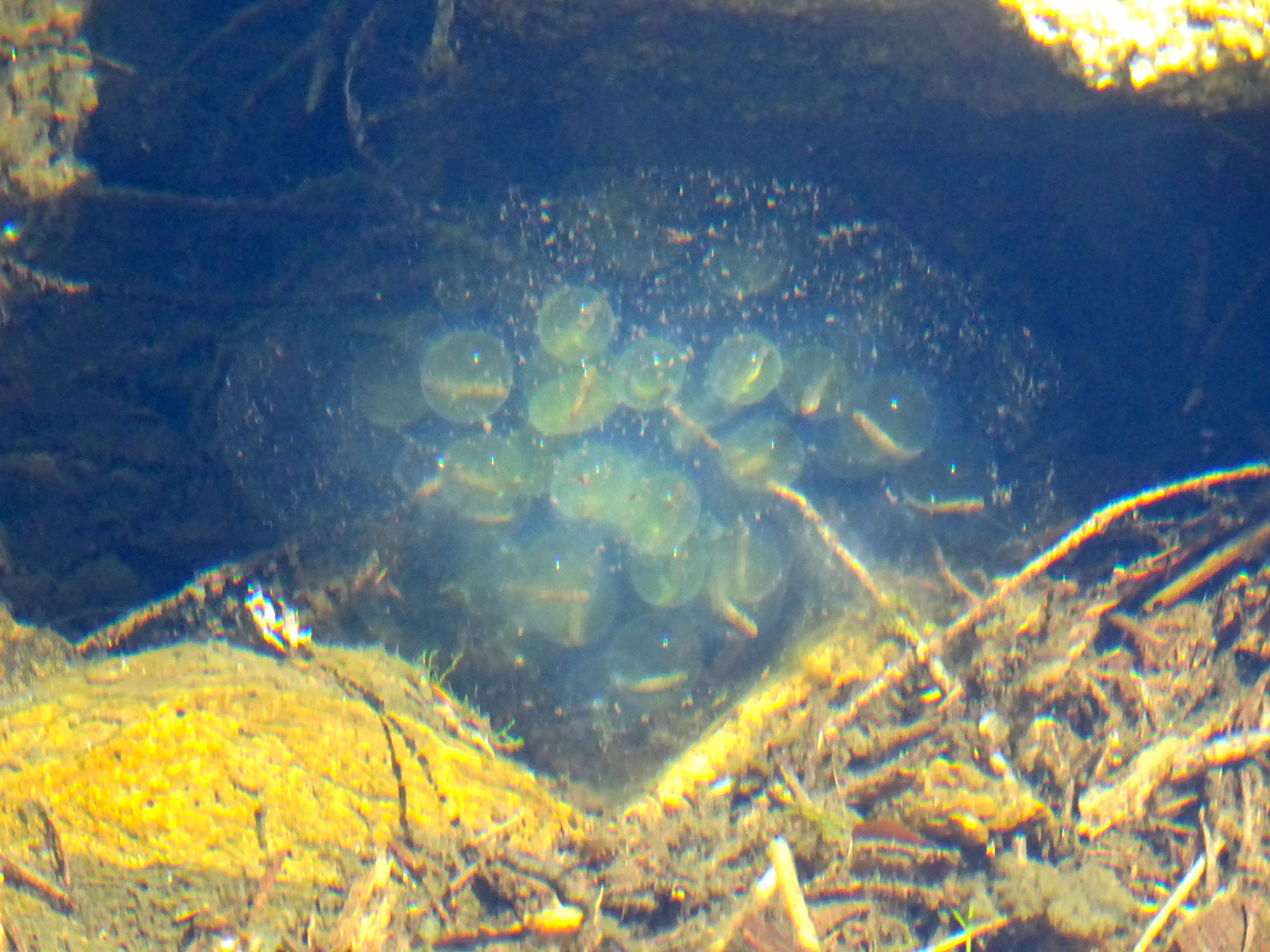
A salamander egg mass in a mountain lake with introduced trout.

Studies conducted in the North Cascades National Park Service Complex examined impacts on larval stage long-toed salamanders through snorkel observations. The long-toed salamander is considered the top vertebrate predator in high-elevation fishless lakes, but the presence of fish species often equates to lower densities of larvae. While fish impact is a notable factor, fish predation is more commonly linked to changes in salamander behavior, particularly nocturnal tendencies. As lakes decrease in elevation and Scientists have examined additional abiotic and biotic factors that lead to declines of salamanders in lake ecosystems. Elevation, water temperature, lake area and depth, as well as availability of suitable food resources, are all factors that interact with fish introductions to influence impacts. Amphibian declines have become a worldwide issue that is most commonly attributed to chemical pollution, acid rain, ozone depletion, habitat destruction, as well as introductions of exotic species Recent studies have shown correlations of decline among amphibians to a chytrid fungus, which causes chytridiomycosis. The pathogen is one of many emerging infectious diseases that largely threaten amphibian populations, especially salamanders. Primarily spread through the import/export of live animals the threat lies when infected animals escape or are released into the wild.

=== Copepods/Gammarus ===
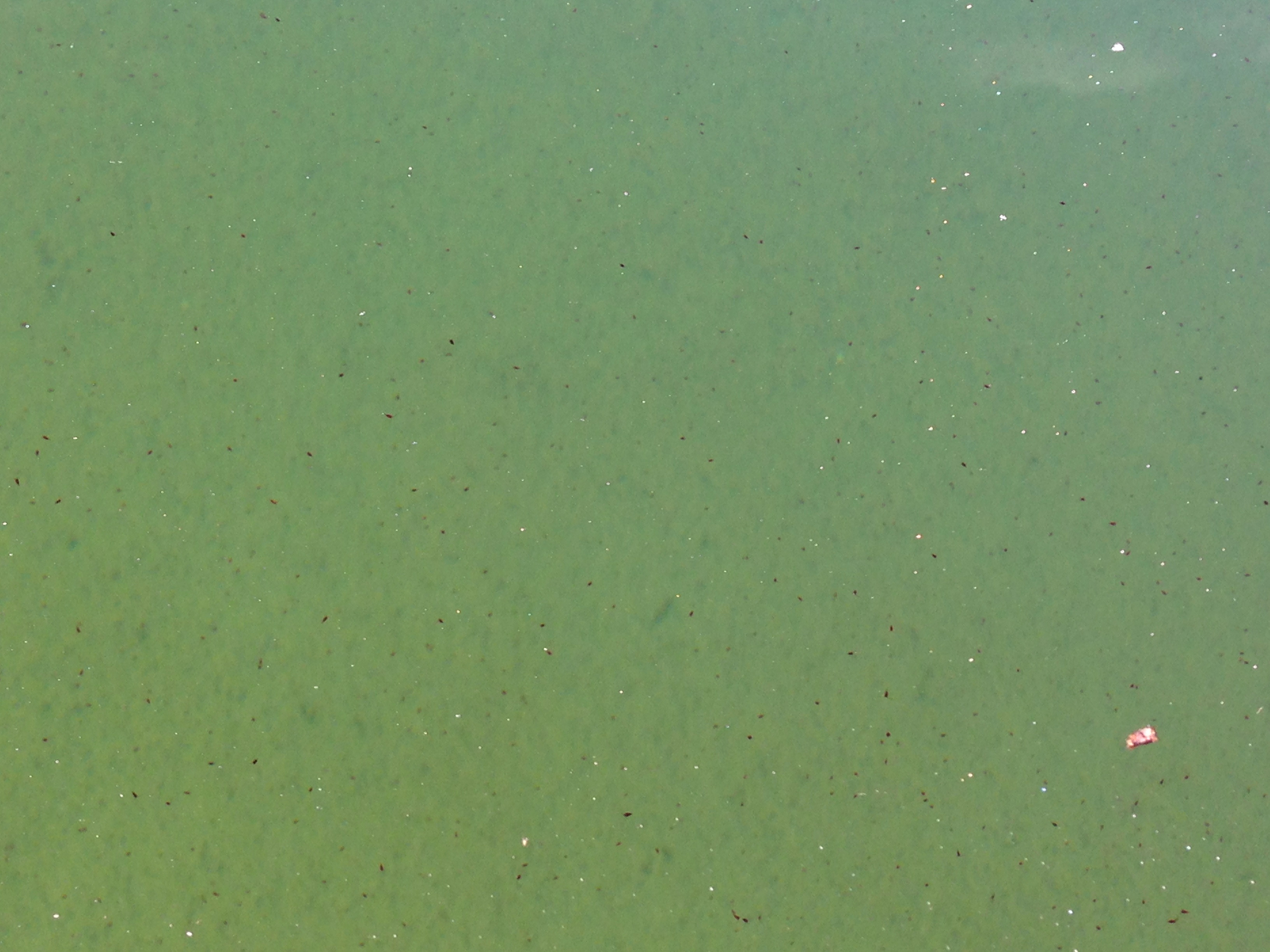
Red copepods speckle the water in a mountain lake.

Copepods are diaptomids, or crustaceous zooplankton, that are found in a wide range of sizes and lake habitats. Fish have large impacts in pelagic habitats that can alter the food chain and even eliminate certain species. Diaptomid kenai is considered a large species that is less commonly found in shallow lakes with trout reproduction. They are often red in color and are easy targets for predatory trout. Lakes with an absence of D. kenai allow smaller copepod species such as D. tymelli to exist in higher numbers. This correlation suggests predation of large copepods on smaller copepod species. In lakes that are deeper and have limited trout reproduction cohabitation has been observed with an overall reduced body size for D.kenai. The presence of Gammarus, a predatory amphipod, also dictates levels within the food chain. [Weidman 2011]. Non-native trout, salamander larvae, or Gammarus will step into the role of top pelagic predator when others above it are absent. Similarly D. kenai will become top predator with the absence of a larger predator in the water column. These dynamic interactions also depend on a variety of abiotic factor, which provide suitable habitat conditions for both the copepod and Gammarus species.

=== Birds and Aquatic Insects ===
Impacts from fish are also felt outside of their lake habitat. A study in the Sierra Nevada Mountains of California observed correlations of trout to reductions in mayflies as a food source for Rosy-Finches. The introduced trout had a cross-boundary effect on an avian competitor. The fish outcompeted the finches for emerging aquatic insects, causing a total reduction of 98% fewer mayflies than emerge from fishless lakes. The lakes without fish were much more productive, with 5.9 times more finches present feeding on the emerging insects. The mayfly is a food source most often utilized by the finches to feed their young, so dramatic decreases in mayfly stocks could have potentially negative impacts on fledgling success rates.

== High lake fish management ==
Given evidence of diverse impacts from trout populations, a debate exists around decisions to continue to stock mountain lakes with trout fry. Each lake represents a unique ecosystem that holds different management challenges. Plans exist which precisely lay out past mistakes and future plans for a reorganization of priorities in lake management. In many cases efforts are successful, but some lakes are still strongly affected by fish overpopulation. Other cases favor the elimination of fish entirely as there may be potential negative downstream impacts on native fish's genetic purity and rehabilitation efforts, especially bull trout.

=== Frogs ===
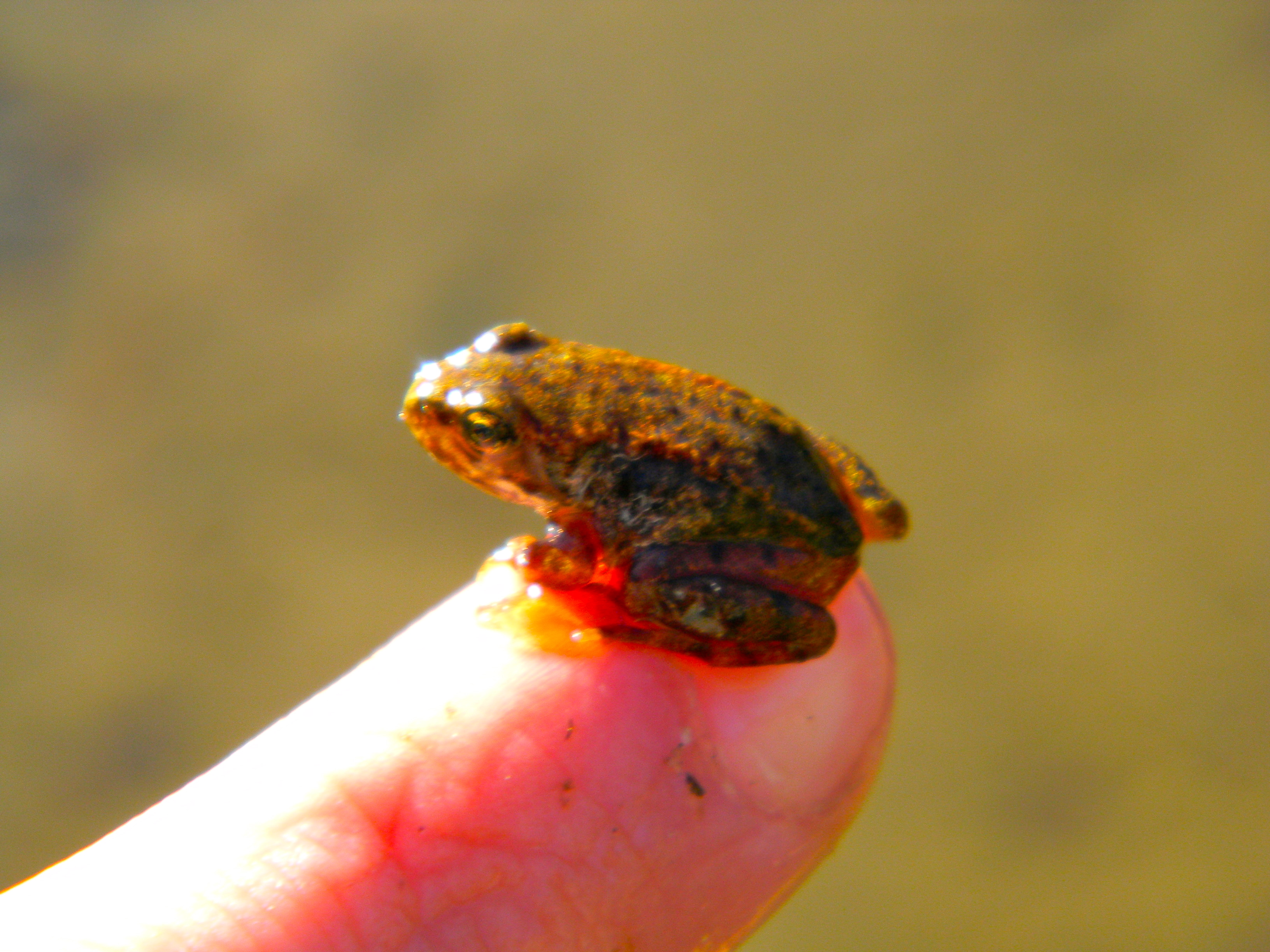
A small frog found in a once stocked, now fish-less lake.

While concerns exist within the western United States and Canada, amphibian studies are conducted around the world to assess the impacts of trout. Eastern brook trout have negatively affected the presence and breeding success of the common frog (Rana temporaria) in the Gran Paradiso National Park (Italian Alps). The exposed lakes above tree line offered few hiding places for adults, tadpoles and egg masses. Eastern brook trout were found to survive in such environments at “depressed growth rates”, similar to the patterns of overstocking found in the United States. To reestablish the suitability of alpine lakes as breeding sites for Rana temporaria, complete eradication of fish is proposed. Lower elevation lakes, however feature greater habitat complexity and allow opportunity for stable populations of both frog and fish.

=== Introduction of piscivorous fish species ===
Efforts have been made in Idaho and Washington to assist in controlling stunted, overpopulated lakes by introducing known piscivorous fish species such as the brown trout, lake trout, and tiger muskellunge. Studies conducted in Idaho primarily focused on the tiger muskellunge and have been successful in low complexity habitats. The presence of these fish has drastically reduced brook trout populations, increasing average length and weight of remaining fish. Similarly, biologists in Washington have adopted the implementation of tiger muskellunge and are still studying the impacts of these fish. Historically, efforts in Washington have been made that seek similar results. Both brown trout and lake trout were introduced into various lakes within the Washington Cascades and monitoring took place over a 20-year span. While minimal improvements were noted with brown trout introductions, the largest success came from lake trout introductions. While the tiger muskellunge were stocked at a length of nearly 11 inches, the brown and lake trout were stocked as fingerlings and results did not become evident until up to 12 years later. For shorter-term elimination efforts the introduction of fish at a larger size is likely to achieve desired performance.

=== Gill netting ===
This approach is often seen a short term, temporary effort. The act of gill netting a lake requires extensive time and labor and is not a reliable removal method. One study reportedly eliminated eastern brook trout from a 2.5 ha lake after 10,000 net-nights. Effectiveness is lost with large, deep lakes or lakes with a complex shoreline filled with woody debris.

=== Piscicides ===
Two of the traditionally used piscidies in lake management are rotenone and antimycin. Chemical applications are often looked down upon from a public standpoint, as there are negative connotations with poisoning an otherwise pristine environment and the killing of non-target organisms. When piscides are used, antimycin is often the preferred choice as there is little impact on lake invertebrates and its toxicity naturally subsides before reaching fish populations downstream. Rotenone detoxifies at a slower rate and has adverse effects on the entire lake community. Both are expensive and there is difficulty in application because of remoteness.

=== Compromise – low density stocking ===
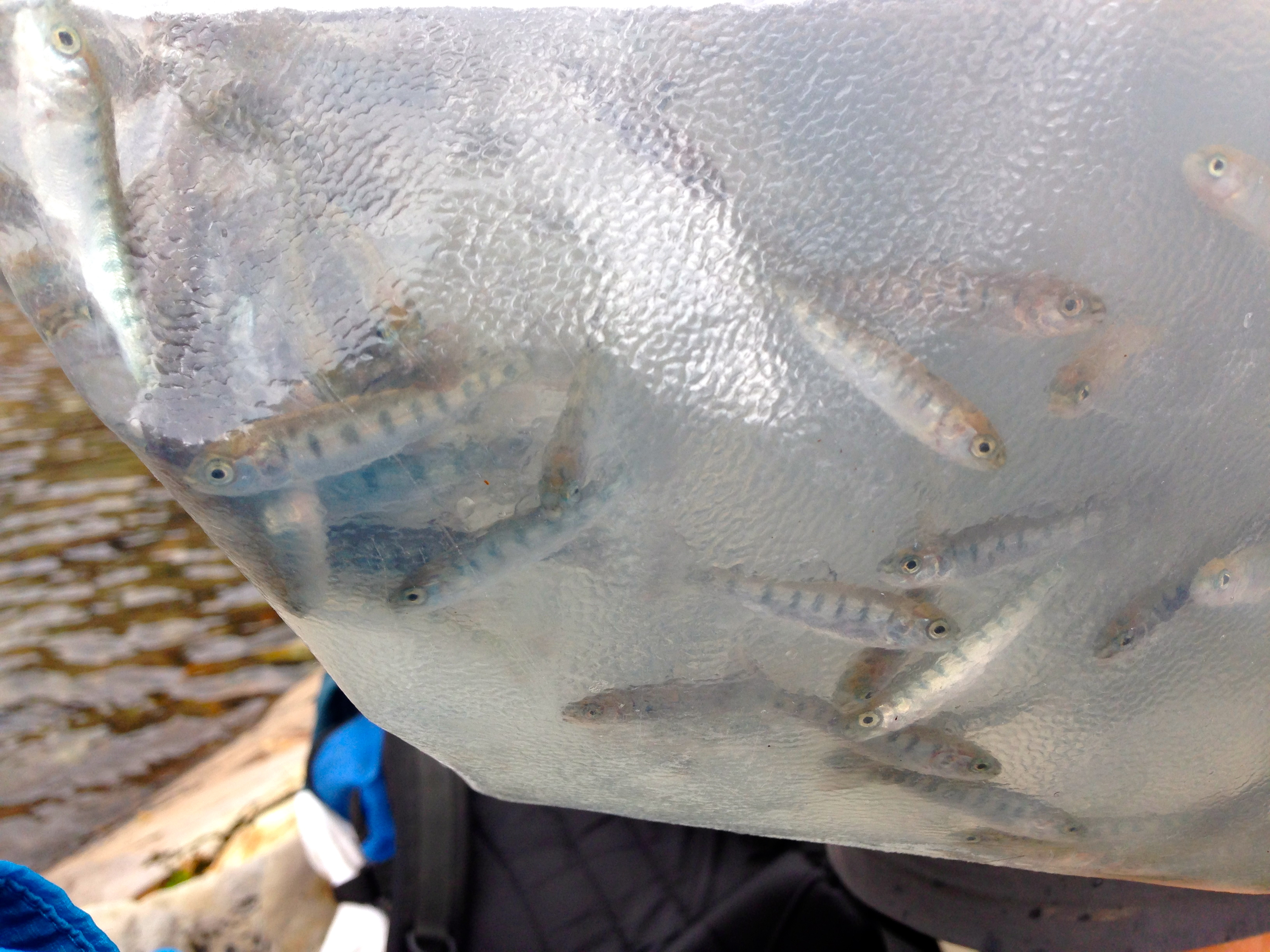
Low density stocking practices reduce impact on biota and improve quality of fishing.

Many practices in fish management that took place in the early 20th century serve as lessons and reminders that careful attention must be paid to fragile lake ecosystems. As debate continues over biodiversity in mountain lakes there will likely be a compromise required for success. One approach is low-density fish stocking. This requires baseline surveys that assess a lake's abiotic and biotic factors before stocking any trout species. Likewise, with reduced numbers of trout going into lakes there is less environmental impact and greater opportunity for recreational fishing. Fish grow to greater sizes due to lack of competition for food and there are not enough fish present to negatively impact biota. Additional efforts are being made to avoid easily reproducing species of trout, as well as stocking sterile triploid fish. By introducing species that do not reproduce the fish are of the same age class and will eventually die, therefore allowing biota to recover. Reproducing fish put continual pressure on the biota of the lake. Overall the debate continues as lake management plans vary on a case to case basis and require reevaluation as species populations fluctuate.
