= National Register of Historic Places listings in Grays Harbor County, Washington =

Location of Grays Harbor County in Washington

This is intended to be a complete list of the properties and districts on the National Register of Historic Places in Grays Harbor County, Washington, United States. Latitude and longitude coordinates are provided for many National Register properties and districts; these locations may be seen together in an online map.

There are 22 properties and districts listed on the National Register in the county. Another 3 properties were once listed but have been removed.

This National Park Service list is complete through NPS recent listings posted August 14, 2026.

== Current listings ==
	Name on the Register	Image	Date listed	Location	City or town	Description
1	American Veterans Building	American Veterans Building	January 14, 2011 (#10001131)	307 7th St. 46°58′40″N 123°53′07″W	Hoquiam	
2	Carnegie Library	Carnegie Library	August 3, 1982 (#82004216)	621 K St. 46°58′38″N 123°53′09″W	Hoquiam	Carnegie Libraries of Washington TR
3	Neil Cooney Mansion	Neil Cooney Mansion	July 14, 1983 (#83003324)	802 E. 5th St. 46°57′01″N 123°46′11″W	Cosmopolis	
4	Grays Harbor Light Station	Grays Harbor Light Station	November 2, 1977 (#77001333)	W of Westport; 46°53′18″N 124°06′56″W	Westport	
5	Judge Charles W. Hodgdon House	Judge Charles W. Hodgdon House	April 27, 2005 (#05000365)	717 Bluff Ave. 46°59′02″N 123°53′15″W	Hoquiam	
6	Hoquiam Olympic Stadium	Hoquiam Olympic Stadium	August 22, 2006 (#06000731)	2811 Cherry St. 46°59′03″N 123°51′32″W	Hoquiam	
7	Hoquiam River Bridge	Hoquiam River Bridge	July 16, 1982 (#82004217)	N of SR 12; 46°58′32″N 123°52′32″W	Hoquiam	Historic Bridges and Tunnels in Washington TR
8	Hoquiam's Castle	Hoquiam's Castle	April 11, 1973 (#73001868)	515 Chenault Ave. 46°59′04″N 123°53′16″W	Hoquiam	
9	Hotel Morck	Hotel Morck	May 23, 2016 (#16000294)	215 S. K Street; 46°58′23″N 123°49′08″W	Aberdeen	
10	Edward & Laura Hulbert House	Edward & Laura Hulbert House	May 14, 2018 (#100002405)	807 N M St. 46°58′41″N 123°49′41″W	Aberdeen	
11	Kestner Homestead	Kestner Homestead	July 13, 2007 (#07000741)	Quinault River Valley, .5 mi. N of Quinault River Ranger Station, along west side of Kestner Creek, Quinault sub-distr 47°30′38″N 123°49′09″W	Lake Quinault	
12	Lake Quinault Lodge	Lake Quinault Lodge	July 9, 1998 (#98000846)	South Shore Rd. 47°28′01″N 123°50′50″W	Lake Quinault	
13	Joseph Lytle House	Joseph Lytle House	July 12, 1990 (#90001073)	509 Chenault; 46°59′03″N 123°53′24″W	Hoquiam	
14	Masonic Temple-Hoquiam	Masonic Temple-Hoquiam	September 5, 2007 (#07000934)	510 8th St. 46°58′38″N 123°53′14″W	Hoquiam	
15	Old McCleary Hotel	Old McCleary Hotel	August 1, 1996 (#96000842)	42 N. Summit Rd. 47°03′34″N 123°15′55″W	McCleary	
16	Lachlin McTaggart House	Lachlin McTaggart House	August 29, 1985 (#85001942)	224 L St. 46°58′42″N 123°53′34″W	Hoquiam	Multiple typos in the nomination summary: 2240 L St. should be 224 L St. McTaggert should be McTaggart.
17	Ole Mickelson Cabin	Ole Mickelson Cabin	May 6, 1993 (#92001291)	Lot 46, S shore Lake Quinault, between Willaby Cr. and Falls Cr. 47°27′53″N 123°51′11″W	Quinault	
18	F. Arnold Polson House and Alex Polson Grounds	F. Arnold Polson House and Alex Polson Grounds	June 19, 1979 (#79002533)	1611 Riverside Ave. 46°58′44″N 123°52′45″W	Hoquiam	
19	Seventh Street Theater	Seventh Street Theater	August 6, 1987 (#87001334)	313 Seventh St. 46°58′36″N 123°53′07″W	Hoquiam	
20	Sierra (motor ship)	Sierra (motor ship)	March 29, 1978 (#78002745)	1401 Sargent Blvd. 46°58′31″N 123°48′02″W	Aberdeen	
21	U.S. Post Office – Hoquiam Main	U.S. Post Office – Hoquiam Main	May 30, 1991 (#91000645)	620 Eighth St. 46°58′30″N 123°53′11″W	Hoquiam	
22	U.S. Post Office – Montesano Main	U.S. Post Office – Montesano Main	May 30, 1991 (#91000649)	211 Pioneer Ave. W. 46°58′46″N 123°36′04″W	Montesano	

== Former listings ==
	Name on the Register	Image	Date listed	Date removed	Location	City or town	Description
1	Chow Chow Bridge	Chow Chow Bridge	July 16, 1982 (#82004218)	April 25, 1988	Spans Quinault River	Taholah	Collapsed in April, 1988.
2	Finch Building		October 13, 1983 (#83004230)	May 25, 2000	Heron and H Streets	Aberdeen	Damaged by fire on August 21, 1996.
3	Wishkah River Bridge	Wishkah River Bridge	July 16, 1982 (#82004215)	July 16, 1990	W. Wishkah Rd.	Greenwood	

== See also ==
- List of National Historic Landmarks in Washington (state)
- National Register of Historic Places listings in Washington state
