= Quinault =

Quinault may refer to:

- Quinault people, an Indigenous people of the Pacific Northwest Coast
  - Quinault Indian Nation, a federally recognized tribe
  - Quinault language, their language

== People ==
- Quinault family of actors, including:
- Jean-Baptiste-Maurice Quinault (1687–1745), comedian and musician
  - Jeanne Quinault (1699–1783), actor, bluestocking saloniste
  - Philippe Quinault (1635–1688), French dramatist and librettist
  - Marie-Anne-Catherine Quinault (1695–1791), French singer and composer

== Places ==
- Quinault Canyon
- Lake Quinault
- Quinault River, a river located on the Olympic Peninsula in the U.S. state of Washington
- Quinault Pass
- Quinault Rainforest
- Quinault, Washington

== Other ==
- Quinault Treaty, signed in 1855
- MV Quinault, a Steel Electric Class ferry previously part of the Washington State Ferry system
- Château Quinault, a Saint-Émilion winery
