= Lake Crescent Lodge =

- U.S. National Register of Historic Places
- U.S. Historic district
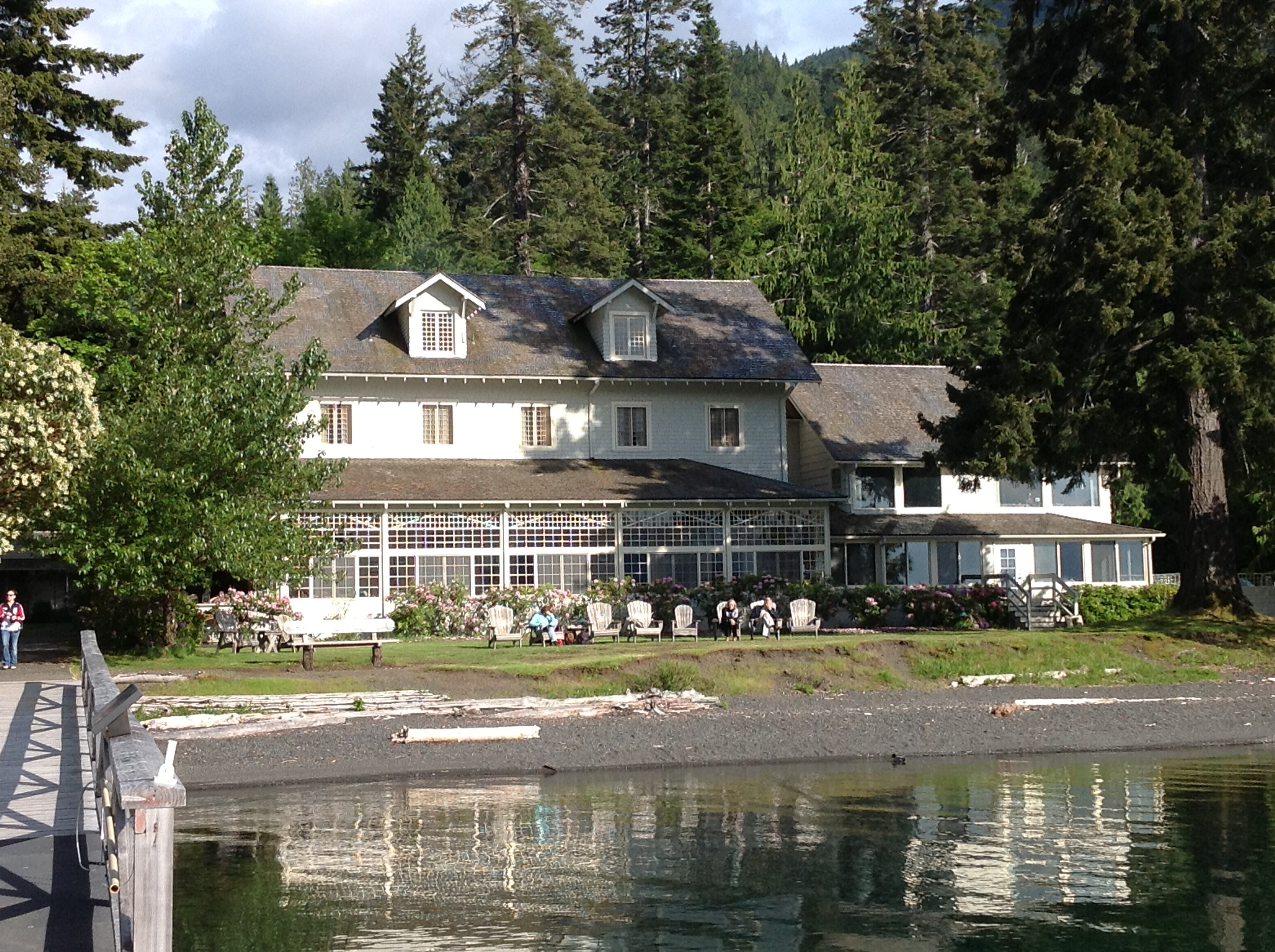

- Location within Washington (state)
- Location: South of Barnes Point, on south shore of Lake Crescent, about 17.4 miles (28.0 km) southwest of Port Angeles, in Olympic National Park
- Coordinates: 48°03′26″N 123°47′57″W
- Area: 14 acres (5.7 ha)
- Built: 1937
- Architectural style: Bungalow/craftsman
- MPS: Olympic National Park MPS
- NRHP reference No.: 07000724
- Added to NRHP: July 13, 2007

Lake Crescent Lodge, originally called Singer's Lake Crescent Tavern, is a historic resort situated on the shores of Lake Crescent west of Port Angeles, Washington. Located on the Olympic Peninsula within Olympic National Park, the Lodge is owned by the National Park Service and operated by Aramark. The Lodge resort is open seasonally from early May until the end of January with select cabins available during the winter months. Hiking and boating are popular activities for guests, and several peaks, including Mount Storm King and Pyramid Mountain, are easily accessible from the resort. Other hiking opportunities include Marymere Falls, Spruce Railroad, and Barnes Creek Trails.

== History ==
In 1914 Avery and Julia Singer built a small hotel and cottages at Barnes Point on the shore of Lake Crescent, opening Singer's Tavern in 1915. At the time of its opening, the Tavern consisted of seven Lodge rooms, five of which are still in use today, and a series of cottages, spending nearly $50,000 on the construction and furnishing of the hotel. The two-story main building was built of locally milled timber, its bungalow-like design influenced by Arts and Crafts design principles, and complemented by Roycroft-inspired furnishings. The main living room featured a large stone fireplace, giving on to a porch overlooking the lake. Guest rooms were located upstairs. Lodge guests were offered modern conveniences, a restaurant, and many recreational and evening activities. Additional accommodations were available in the cottages and tent cabins. Julia Singer planted an ornamental garden, which has matured and which contributes to the hotel's ambiance, together with a small golf course, a vegetable garden and fruit trees.

For the first six years of operation, guests of Singer's Tavern arrived by ferry, which continued to be popular throughout the 1920s. However, when the Olympic Highway was completed in 1922, automobiles quickly became the most popular form of transportation to the Lodge. A railroad was also constructed on the opposite side of the lake but was never used for passengers. Completed in 1919, the line was engineered to ship logs for airplane manufacturing during World War I but opened only weeks before the war ended. Since then, the Spruce Railroad Trail has become a popular hiking location, accessible by East Beach Road, and remnants of the original railroad can still be seen.

The Singers sold the property in 1927 to the Seattle Trust Company and from there it passed to Walter and Bessie Bovee. The events of the 1930s greatly impacted the Lodge and the entire region around the lake. In the latter half of that decade, members of Congress proposed the establishment of a large national park encompassing the central, mountainous region of the Olympic Peninsula, and, as a result, the Lodge received its most notable guest, Franklin D. Roosevelt, who visited the peninsula in the fall of 1937. Roosevelt arrived at the lodge the evening of September 30, where he spent the night in one of the now-demolished cabins, continuing on to the Lake Quinault Lodge the next day. While he was at Singer's Tavern, Roosevelt discussed the proposed Olympic National Park with Park Service and Forest Service advisors, and with Washington senators Monrad Wallgren and Homer T. Bone. Following his tour of the Peninsula, the President signed authorization for the creation of Olympic National Park in 1938, which encompassed the Lake Crescent property. Cottages built in the following decade were consequently named the Roosevelt Cabins.

Walter and Bessie Bovee took ownership and brought the Lodge back to life in the 1940s. They expanded the Lodge and offered many recreational activities, including renting out boats and canoes. A shoreline area called Bovee's Meadow, accessible by a short trail from the Lodge, is a popular recreational area. The lodge remained an inholding through the 1940s, when several new lodges and addition to the main lodge were built. In 1951 the National Park Service bought the lodge and its property for $95,000. The Mission 66 initiative proposed the lodge's demolition and replacement with modern facilities. A number of accessory buildings were removed, but the main lodge was spared, though motel-style units were constructed nearby. Several cabins were replaced with newer units of similar character. Lake Crescent Lodge is operated by Aramark and opened seasonally from early May through January with select cabins open through winter.

== Description ==
Lake Crescent Lodge is located at Barnes Point on the south shore of the lake adjacent to Barnes Creek, named after the first homestead built there in the 1890s. This shore is also home to the Olympic Park Institute. Both are situated at the foot of Mount Storm King and encircled with the Olympic Mountain Chain. The Lodge is situated amidst an old-growth forest with rainforest ferns, cedars and fir trees. The irregularly shaped lodge is about 57 feet (17 m) by 36 feet (11 m) with an enclosed porch on the north side and an open porch on the east side. The main lodge is 2-1/2 stories, with a one-story dining room. The wood-frame lodge is covered with wood shingle siding and a wood-shingled roof. The porch windows feature a complex and finely subdivided mullion pattern in three stages, with smaller panes in each higher stage.

The historic district comprises 11 buildings on the lakeshore. The lodge, pier foundations and three cabins are original structures, while seven cabins were rebuilt to complement the earlier buildings.

The district was added to the National Register of Historic Places in 2007.

== See also ==
- Rosemary Inn historic district, located nearby on the lakeshore
- Storm King Ranger Station, also located on Barnes Point
