= Quinault Rex =

Large Douglas fir in Washington state

Quinault Rex is a 302-foot (92 m) tall Douglas fir discovered near the south shore of Lake Quinault in Washington state in 1999. As of 2000, it was the tallest Douglas fir known to be standing.
