= Pyramid Mountain (Clallam County, Washington) =

Mountain in Washington (state), United States

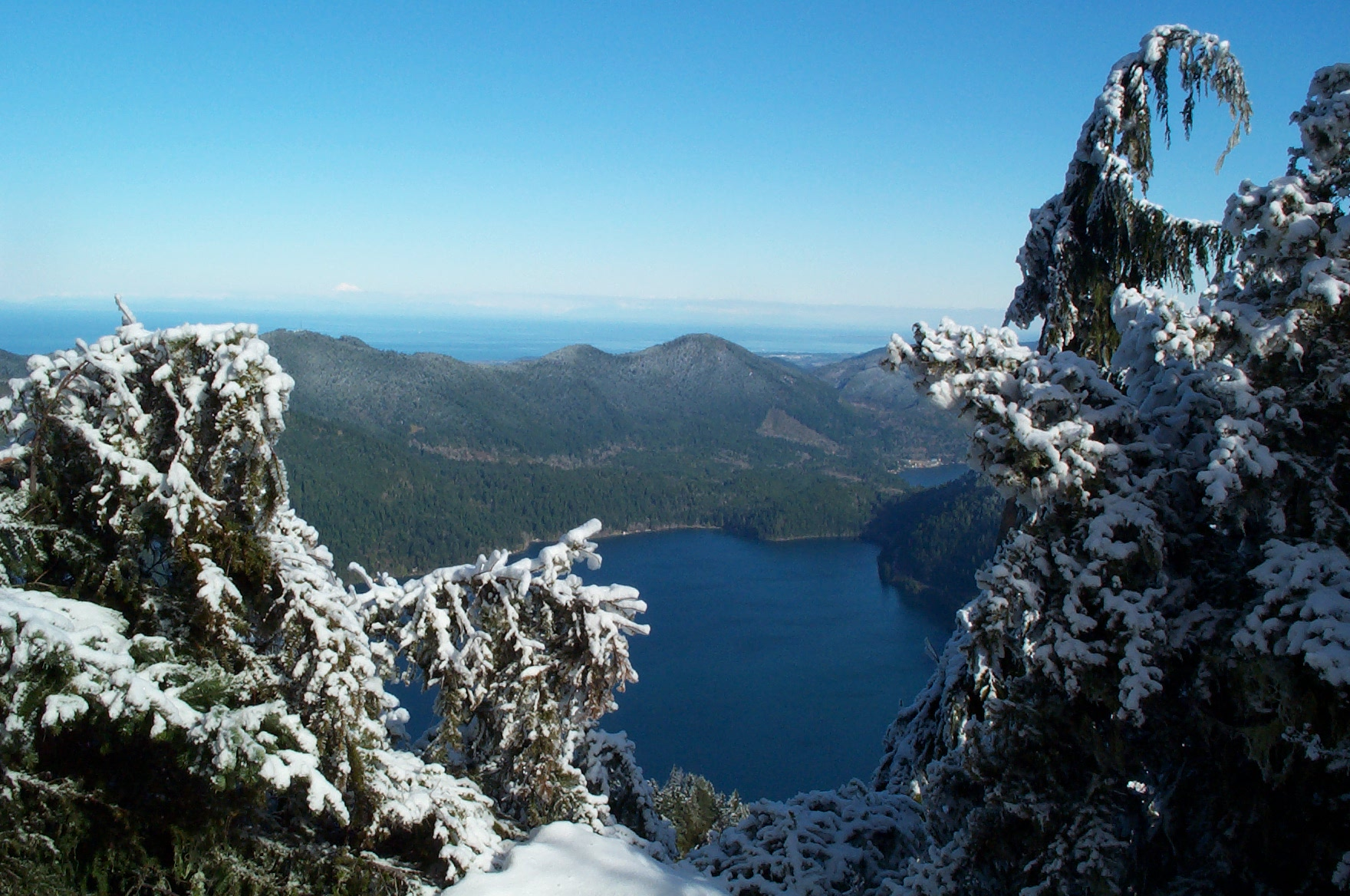
- Pyramid Peak summit view in February with Mount Baker in the distance.

Highest point
- Elevation: 3,100+ ft (940+ m) NGVD 29
- Prominence: 700 ft (210 m)
- Coordinates: 48°04′29″N 123°48′25″W

Geography
- Location: Clallam County, Washington, U.S.
- Parent range: Olympic Mountains

Pyramid Mountain is located high above Lake Crescent's north shore. Once known as Sugarloaf Mountain, it received its present name in 1928. It has a restored Aircraft Warning Service lookout at the summit, which was used to watch for enemy aircraft during World War Two. It dominates the view from Barnes Point and Lake Crescent Lodge. It is accessible by trail from the Spruce Railroad Trail. On a clear day, Mount Baker is visible in the Cascade Range across the Puget Sound.

From the summit, it is easy to see the landslide that blocked Indian Creek and dammed Lake Crescent. Below the landslide is Lake Sutherland and the Indian Creek valley down to the Elwha River.

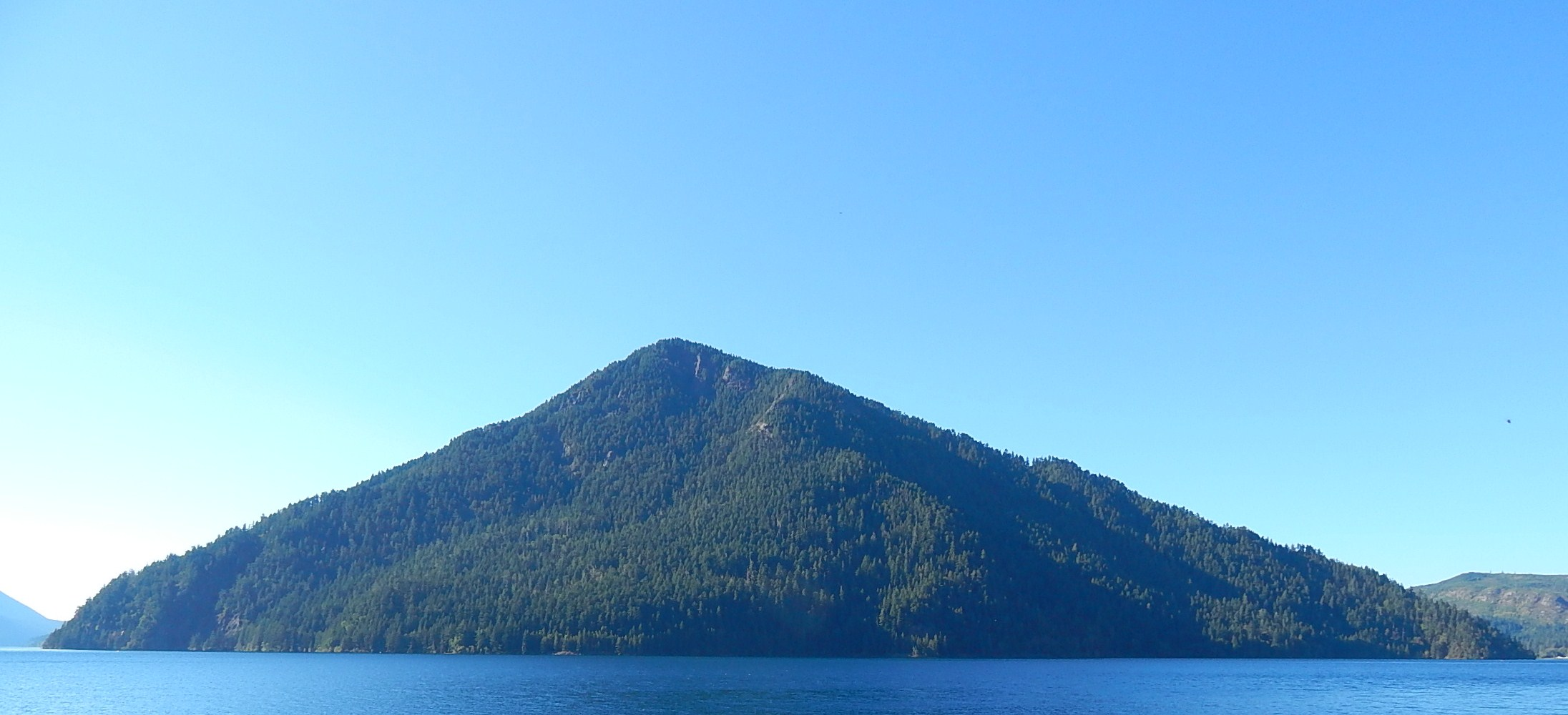
Pyramid Mountain and Lake Crescent in summer

== Climate ==
Set in the north-west portion of the Olympic Mountains, Pyramid Mountain is located in the marine west coast climate zone of western North America. Most weather fronts originate in the Pacific Ocean, and travel northeast toward the Olympic Mountains. As fronts approach, they are forced upward by the peaks of the Olympic Range, causing them to drop their moisture in the form of rain or snowfall (Orographic lift). As a result, the Olympics experience high precipitation, especially during the winter months in the form of snowfall. During winter months, weather is usually cloudy, but, due to high pressure systems over the Pacific Ocean that intensify during summer months, there is often little or no cloud cover during the summer.

== Geology ==
The Olympic Mountains are composed of obducted clastic wedge material and oceanic crust, primarily Eocene sandstone, turbidite, and basaltic oceanic crust. The mountains were sculpted during the Pleistocene era by erosion and glaciers advancing and retreating multiple times.

== See also ==
- Olympic Mountains
- Geology of the Pacific Northwest
- Geography of Washington (state)
