= Carnegie Library (Hoquiam, Washington) =

- U.S. National Register of Historic Places
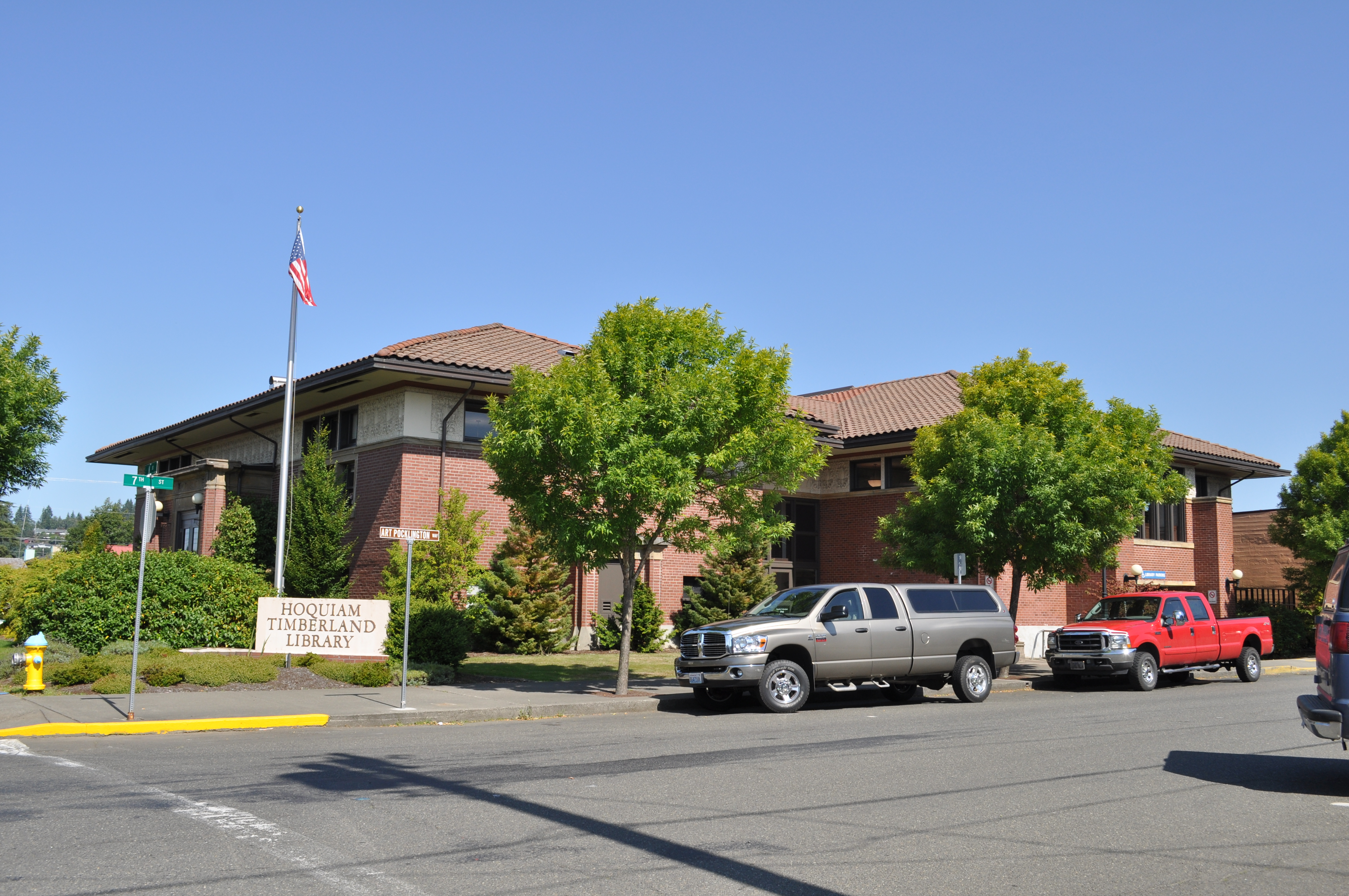
- The library in 2009

- Location within Washington (state) Location within the United States
- Location: 621 K St., Hoquiam
- Coordinates: 46°58′38″N 123°53′9″W
- Area: less than 1 acre (0.40 ha)
- Built: 1911
- Architect: Claude and Starck
- Architectural style: Prairie School
- MPS: Carnegie Libraries of Washington TR (64000892)
- NRHP reference No.: 82004216
- Added to NRHP: August 3, 1982

The Carnegie Library is a historic building still in use as the Hoquiam Timberland Library in Hoquiam, Washington.

== Description ==
One of forty–three Carnegie libraries built in Washington, it is located at 621 K Street in Hoquiam. The Claude and Starck design is a rare example of Prairie School architecture in the region. The two story building is about 40 by 75 feet (12 by 23 m) with a concrete foundation. The main facade faces southwest fronting K Street. A small central wing extends from the back. A detailed plaster frieze is below the eaves of the hip roof which extend about 3 feet (0.91 m) all around the building. A buff Tenino sandstone course joins the frieze and brick which makes up the primary wall material. A central stairway on the main facade leads to the second floor where the main public interior space is situated. This space is a large open room divided by bookshelves. Large single pane windows about 6 feet (1.8 m) above the floor are on all sides of the building and the facade also has double hung one over one windows opening from the first floor. The buildings interior space is 12,761 square feet (1,185.5 m^{2}).

== History ==
The Hoquiam Carnegie Library was built in 1911. The architects were Louis W. Claude and Edward F. Starck (Claude and Starck) of Madison, Wisconsin. The grant for building the library was US$20,000 (equivalent to $691,071 in 2025). It was listed on the National Register of Historic Places in 1982. The building was substantially renovated and restored in 1991, funded by a $1.9 million city bond, a Bishop Foundation grant and bequeathments by local citizens. The project took great care to maintain the architectural and historic integrity of the building. On December 11, 2018, the library re–opened after a preservation and upgrade project. As of 2020 the building is essentially unaltered and remains in use as a public library. The address for the modern library branch is listed as 420 7th Street.

== See also ==
- Andrew Carnegie
- National Register of Historic Places in Grays Harbor County, Washington
- Tenino Stone Company Quarry
