= Hotel Morck =

Historic building in Aberdeen, Washington, US

Coordinates: 46.9729°N 123.8188°W

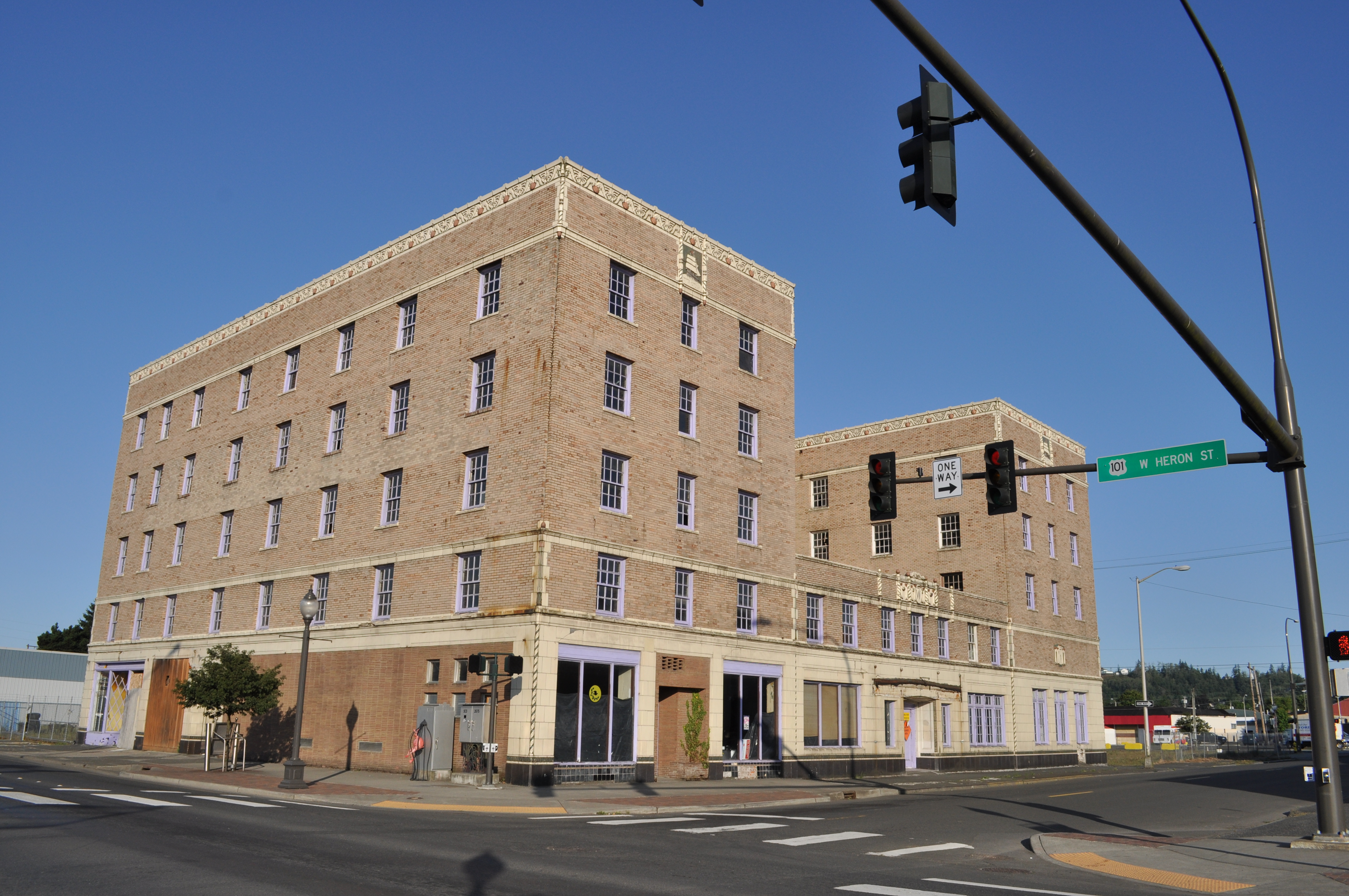

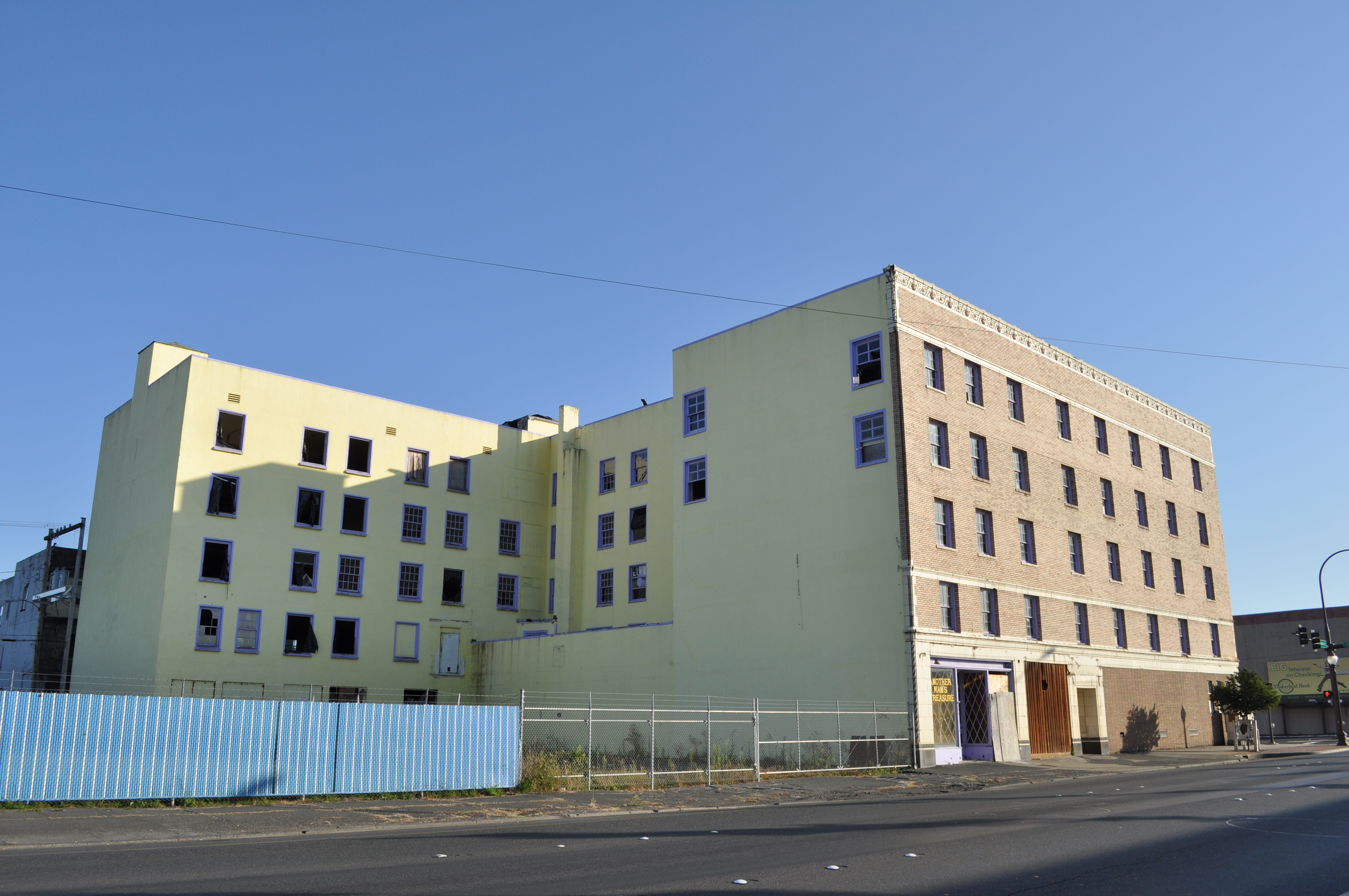

Hotel Morck is a historic hotel building in Aberdeen, Washington. It is listed on the National Register of Historic Places. Kurt Cobain stayed at the hotel when he was 17 and his song "Come as You Are" may have been inspired by its motto. During his teenage years, Cobain visited tenants at the building and allegedly slept in the hallways during a period of homelessness. It is at Heron Street and South K Street. Plans to redevelop the hotel building were discussed in 2019. It was designed by Abraham H. Albertson and built in 1924. It was listed on the National Register in 2016.

== See also ==
- National Register of Historic Places listings in Grays Harbor County, Washington
