= Joseph Lytle House =

- U.S. National Register of Historic Places
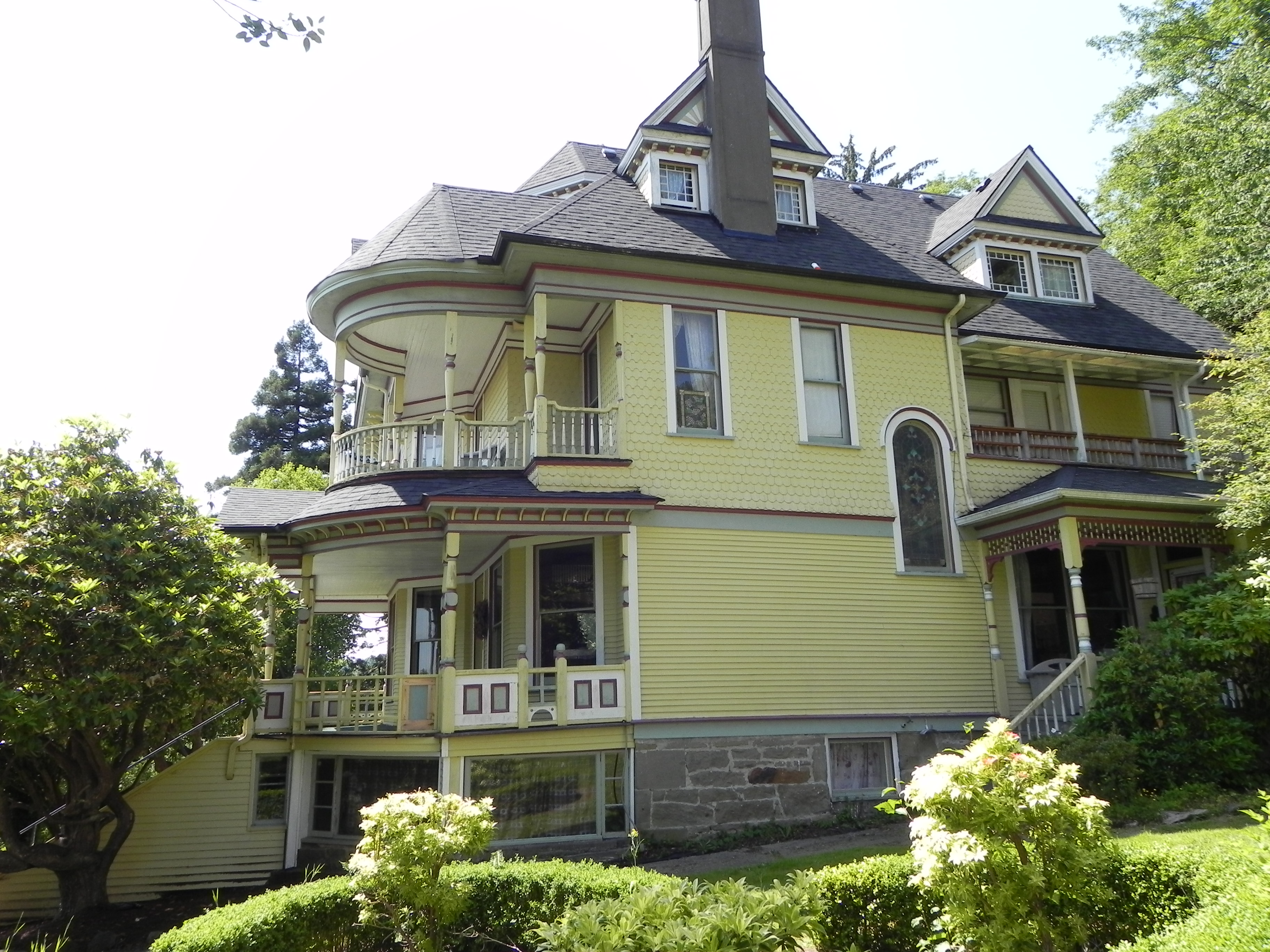
- Joseph Lytle house

- Location within Washington (state) Location within the United States
- Location: 509 Chenault, Hoquiam, Washington
- Coordinates: 46°59′03″N 123°53′24″W
- Area: 1 acre (0.40 ha)
- Built: 1900
- Architectural style: Queen Anne
- NRHP reference No.: 90001073
- Added to NRHP: July 12, 1990

The Joseph Lytle House is a private residence in Hoquiam, Washington. Built in 1900, it was added to the National Register of Historic Places in 1990.

== Description ==
The 2 1/2-story, four-bedroom, wood-frame house is approximately 35 by 50 feet (11 m × 15 m). It is Queen Anne in style, with the irregular massing, projecting porches and window bays, and a variety of exterior textures consistent with that style. The interior woodwork is golden oak. Behind the home are a carriage house, which is connected to the main house by a breezeway, and the caretaker's cottage.

== History ==
The Lytle brothers, Robert and Joseph, ran a grocery business in Fairhaven, Washington, then moved their business to Hoquiam. In the 1880s, Hoquiam became a center for lumber. When a customer paid his bill by turning over his logging operation, the brothers became part of the logging industry.

Joseph built his house on a hill overlooking Hoquiam in 1900, next door to his brother's grander mansion. After his death in 1914, his widow lived in the home until the early 1930s. In the 1940s, the home was converted to apartments.
