= Hoquiam's Castle =

United States national historic place

- U.S. National Register of Historic Places
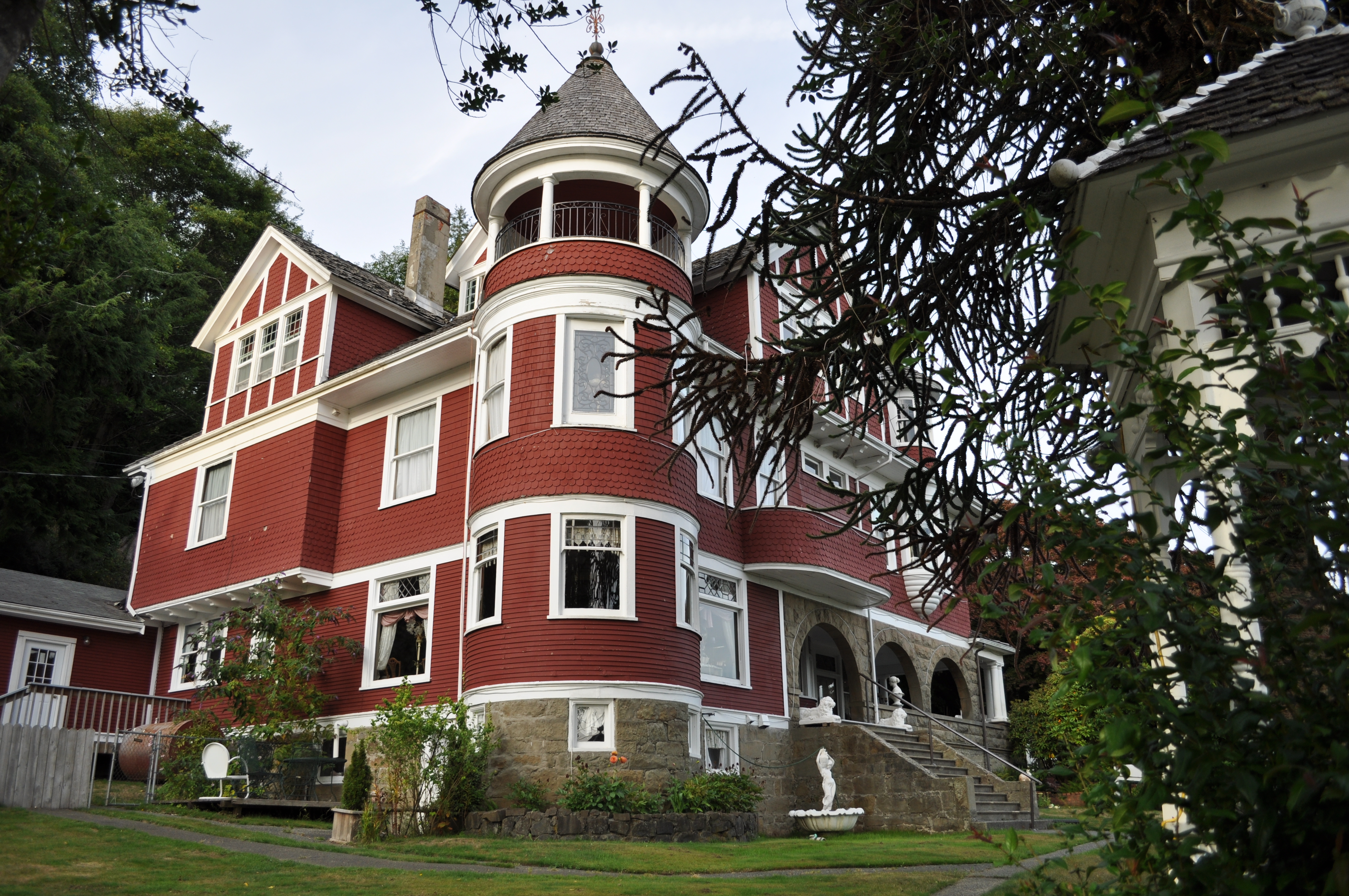
- Hoquiam's Castle

- Location within Washington (state) Location within the United States
- Location: 515 Chenault Ave., Hoquiam, Washington
- Coordinates: 46°59′04″N 123°53′16″W
- Area: less than one acre
- Built: 1897-1900
- Architectural style: Richardsonian Romanesque
- NRHP reference No.: 73001868
- Added to NRHP: April 11, 1973

Hoquiam's Castle, also known as the Robert Lytle Mansion, is a private residence in Hoquiam, Washington. Built in 1897 and completed in 1900, it was added to the National Register of Historic Places in 1973.

== Description ==
Hoquiam's Castle is a wood-frame structure on a hand-fitted sandstone foundation situated on a hillside. Primarily Richardsonian Romanesque style, the exterior includes Queen Anne and Shingle elements. The structure consists of a full basement, three floors, and an unfinished fourth floor.

The entrance to the 10,000 square feet (930 m^{2}) house is fronted by 12 feet (3.7 m) wide sandstone stairs with a sandstone arch and cement lions at the top. The sandstone for the foundation and stairs was quarried in Tenino, Washington. On the southwest corner is a tower projecting from the third floor. The house has over 20 rooms. Interior woodwork on the first floor is golden oak. The main salon is illuminated by a 600 piece crystal chandelier. Both the music room and dining room have 9 by 5 feet (2.7 m × 1.5 m) pocket doors. The third floor has a ballroom with a 20 by 60 feet (6.1 m × 18.3 m) bandstand. A bathroom on the second floor contains a porcelain commode made by Thomas Crapper.

The mansion was the first home in Hoquiam to have electric lights.

== History ==
The Lytle brothers, Robert and Joseph, ran a grocery business in Fairhaven, Washington, then moved their business to Hoquiam. In the 1880s, Hoquiam became a center for lumber. When a customer paid his bill by turning over his logging operation, the brothers became part of the logging industry.

Robert F. Lytle began building his house in 1897, next door to his brother's house. Robert's house which became known as Hoquiam's Castle was completed in 1900.

Shortly after the house was completed, Lytle gave it to his niece, Theadosia Bale, as a wedding gift. After Bale died in the 1950s, the house was unoccupied until 1968. In the early 1970s, the Robert Watson family restored Hoquiam's Castle. For some years, it was operated as Hoquiam's Castle Bed and Breakfast. When it was sold in 2004, the new owner allowed it to be set up as a "haunted house" to raise money for children's activities.

As of March 2026, Hoquiam's Castle is listed as permanently closed.
