= Quinault Rain Forest =

Forest in Washington, United States

Coordinates: 47°30′18.5″N 123°49′17″W

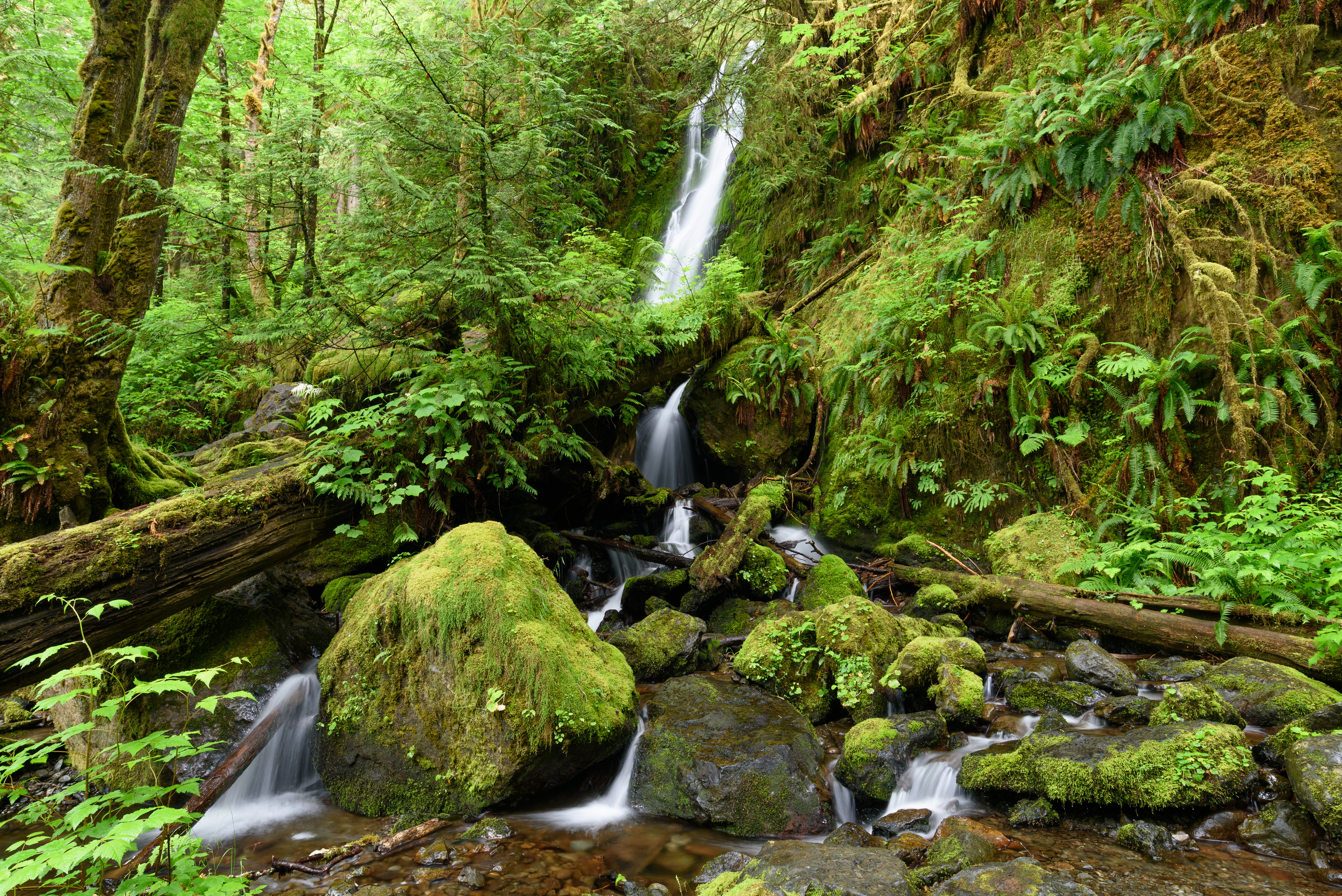
Merriman Falls on Merriman Creek, which flows into Lake Quinault.

The Quinault Rain Forest is a temperate rain forest, which is part of the Olympic National Park and the Olympic National Forest in the U.S. state of Washington in Grays Harbor and Jefferson Counties. The rain forest is located in the valley formed by the Quinault River and Lake Quinault. The valley is called the "Valley of the Rain Forest Giants" because of the number of record size tree species located there. The largest specimens of Western Red Cedar, Sitka Spruce, Western Hemlock, Alaskan Cedar and Mountain Hemlock are found in the forest as well as five of the ten largest Douglas firs.

The forest receives an average of 17 feet (5.2 m) of rain per year. It is believed to be the area with the greatest number of record size giant tree species in the smallest area in the world. It does have the largest trees in the world outside of the state of California and New Zealand.

== Location ==
Located on the western side of the Olympic Mountains, the Quinault Valley was carved out by a glacier and ends at Lake Quinault. Quinault Rain Forest is a tourist area with a number of resorts and lodges located on either side of Lake Quinault.

== Flora ==
The valley is also one of only two places in North America, the other being Liberty County, Florida, where a naturalized population of Venus fly traps exists outside of the Carolinas. It’s believed that much like the population in Florida, they were intentionally introduced to the area by plant enthusiasts who understood that it contained exactly the right conditions for the notoriously picky plants to thrive.

== Gallery ==
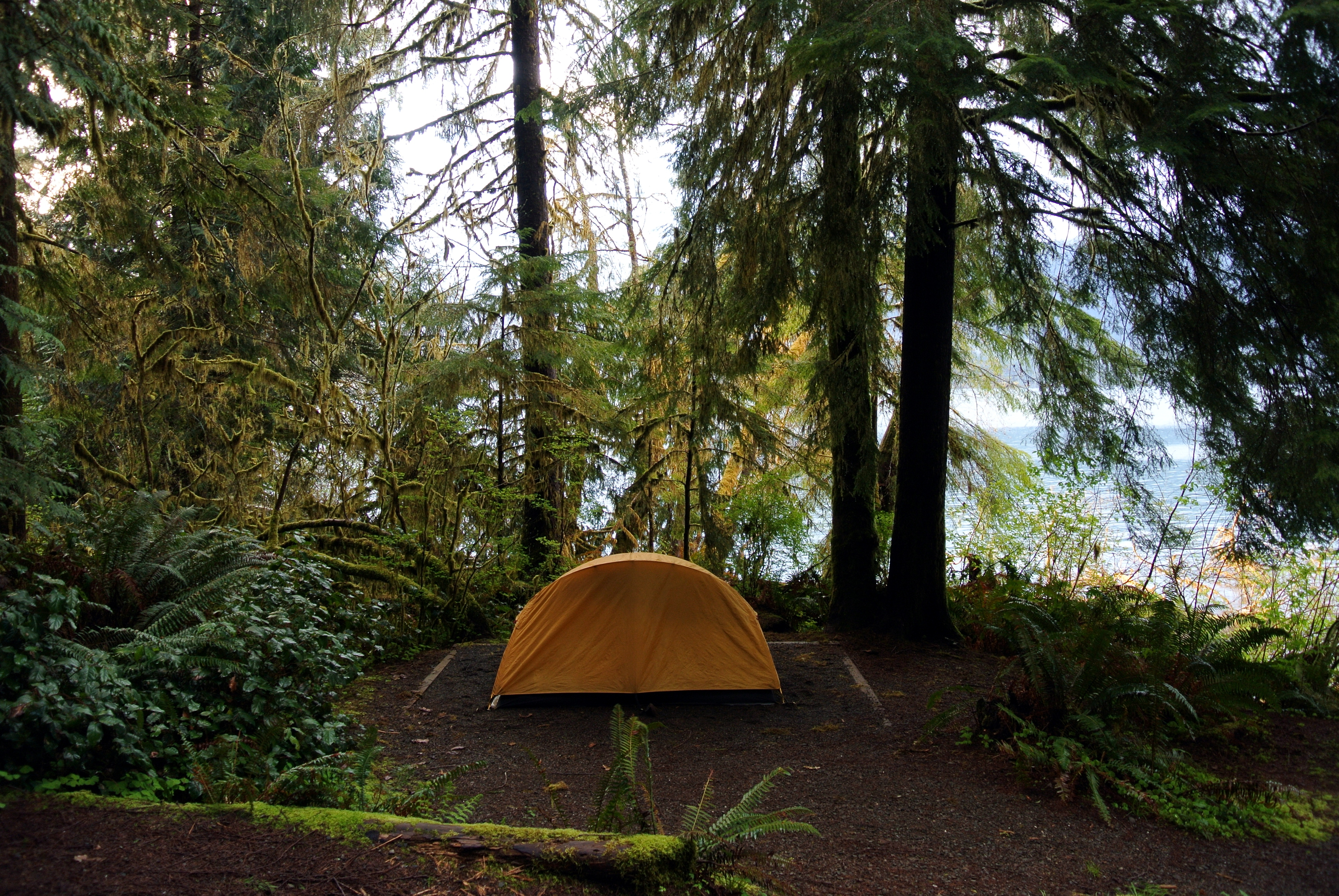
Camping site on the shores of Lake Quinault

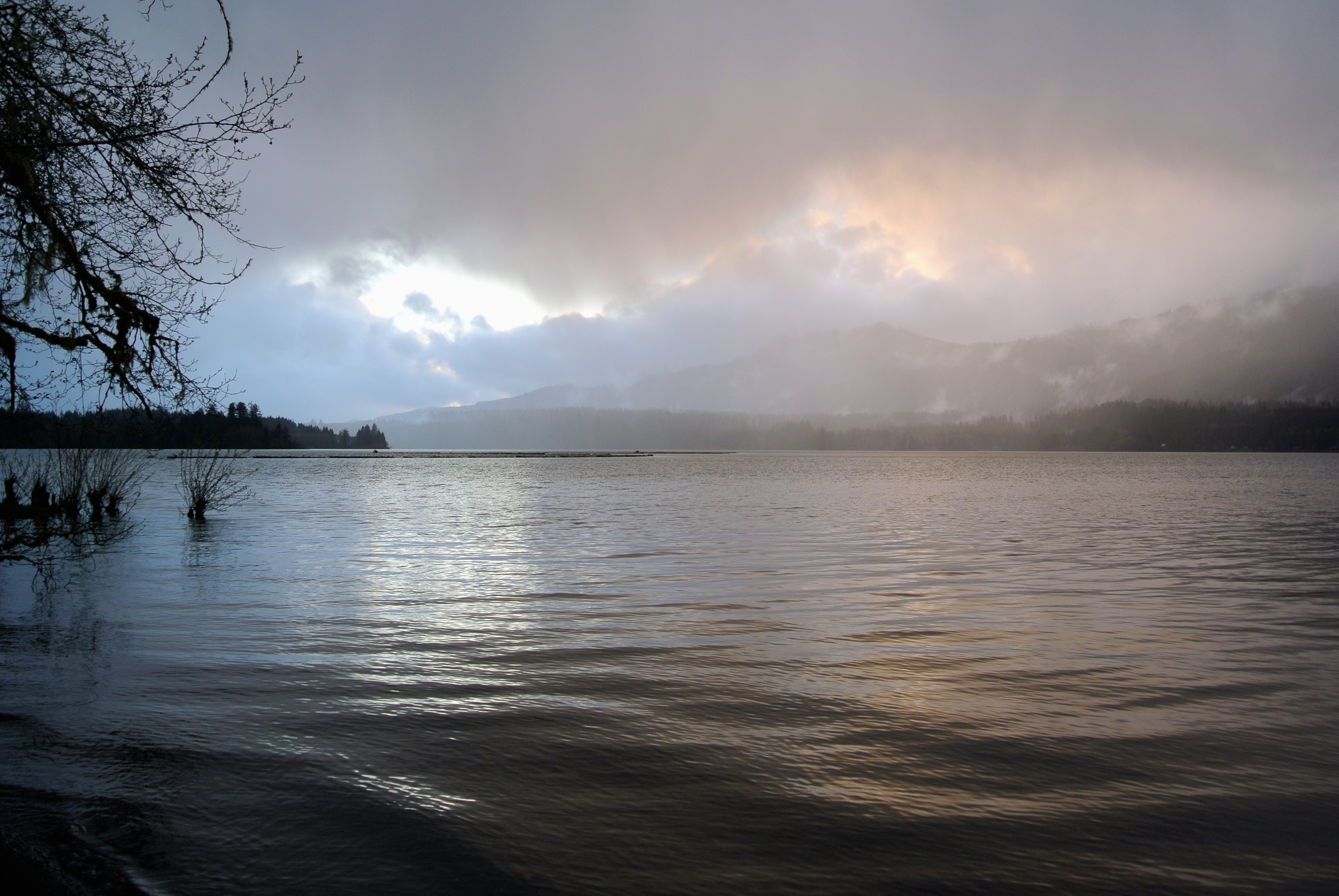
Lake Quinault and rainforest in the mist

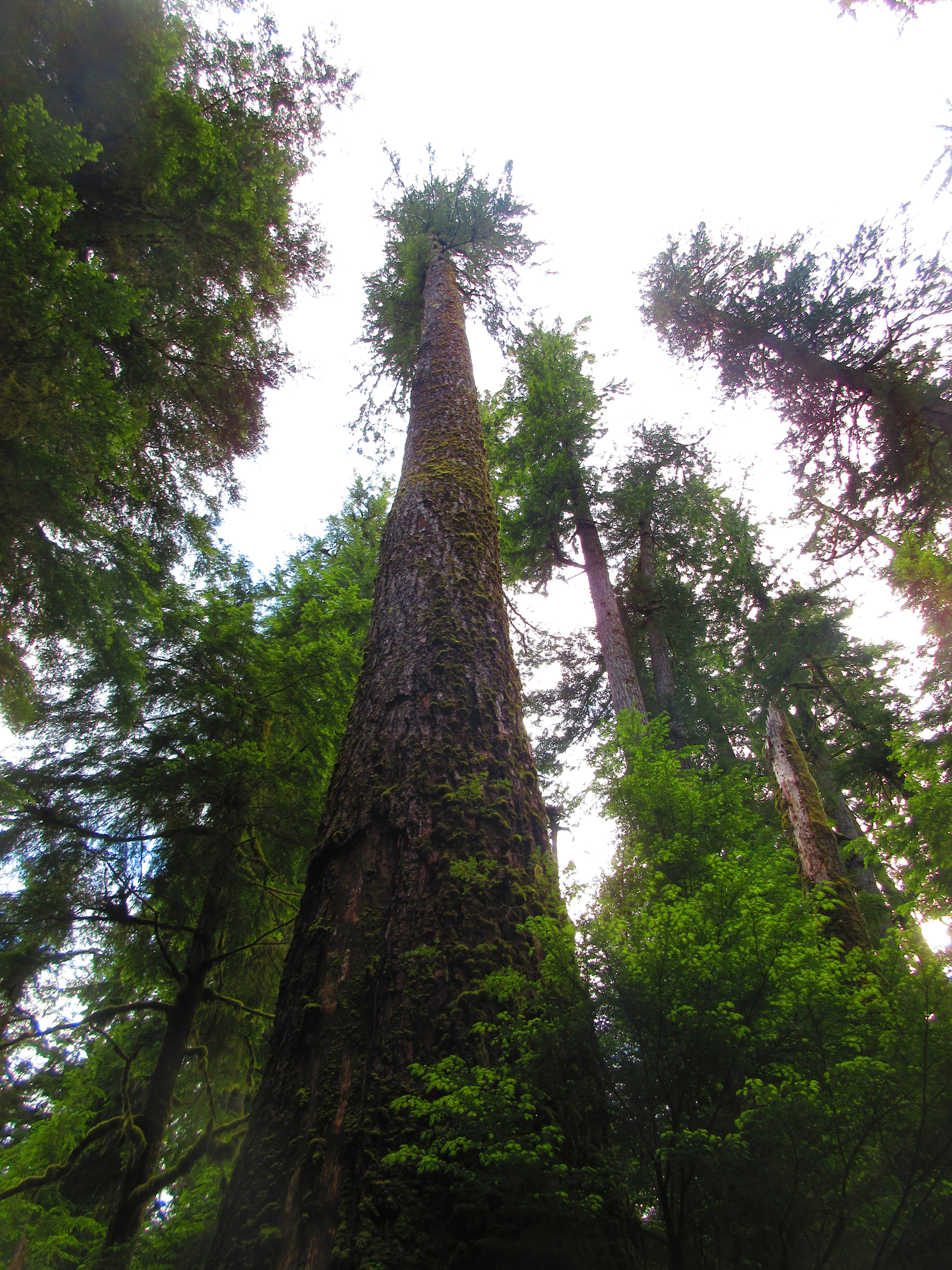
Old growth Douglas Firs

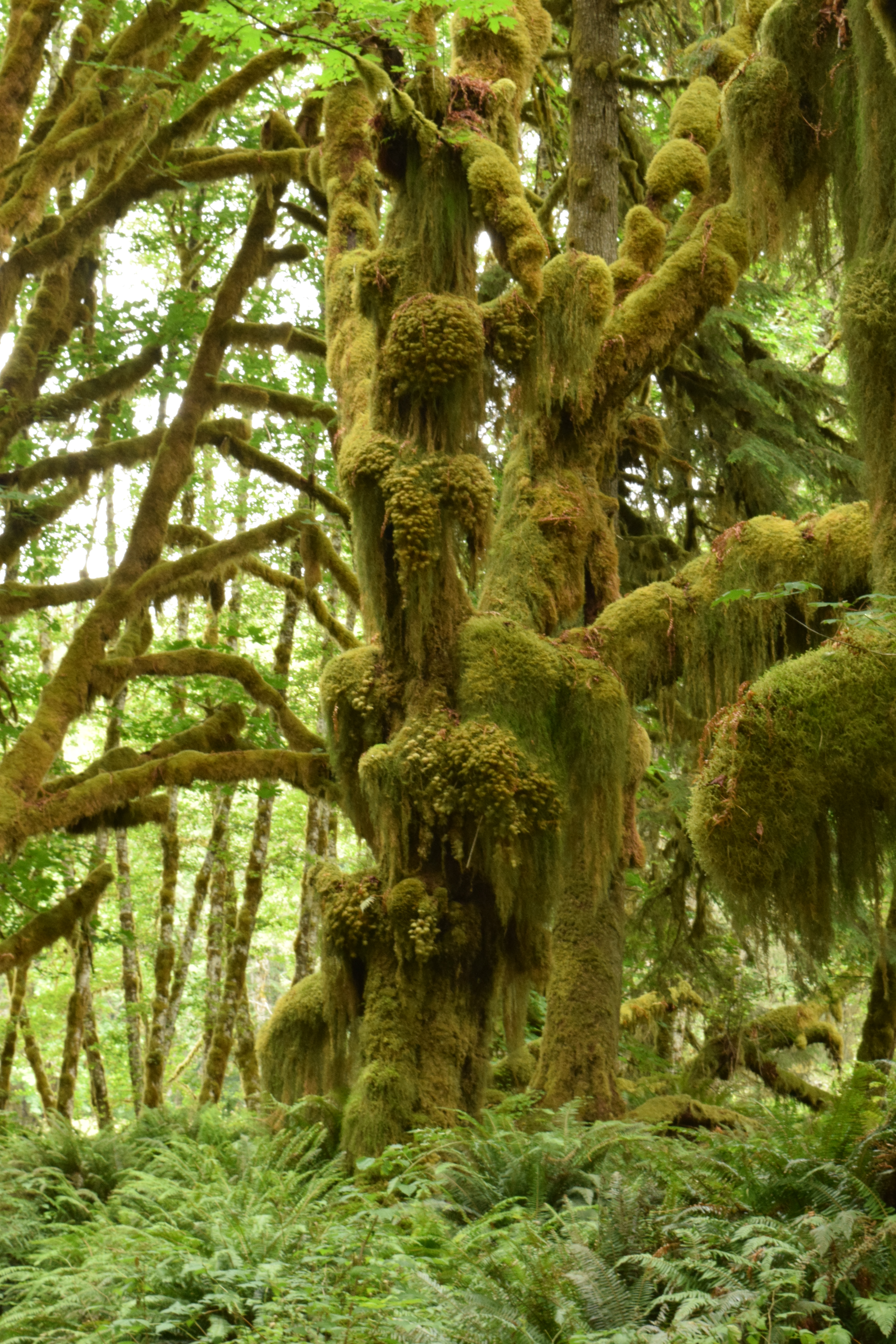
Tree in Quinault Rainforest
