= Lake Quinault Lodge =

- U.S. National Register of Historic Places
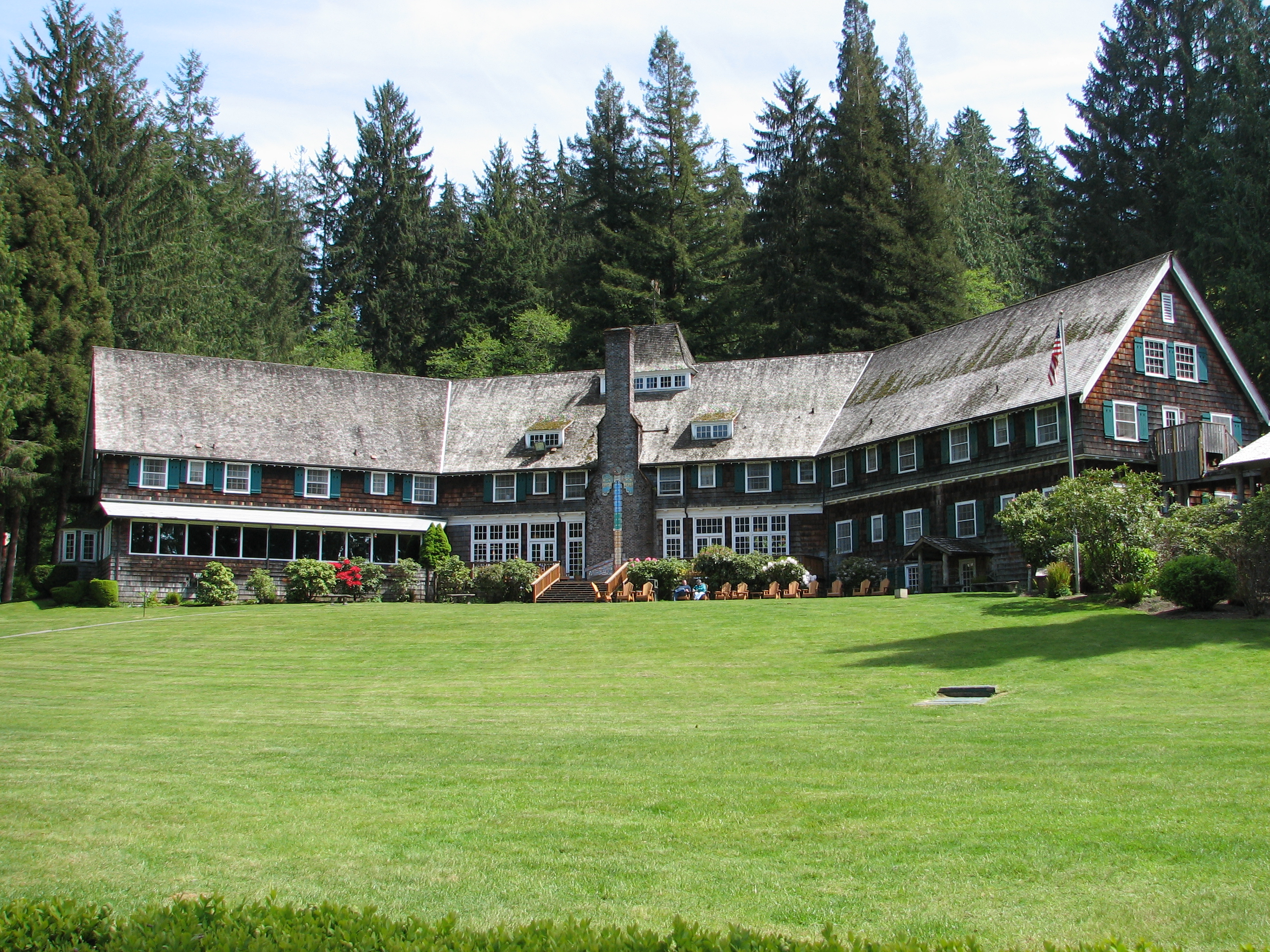

- Location within Washington (state)
- Location: South Shore Rd., Lake Quinault, Washington
- Coordinates: 47°28′1″N 123°50′50″W
- Area: 3.1 acres (1.3 ha)
- Built: 1926
- Architect: Reamer, Robert Chambers
- Architectural style: Colonial Revival, Rustic
- NRHP reference No.: 98000846
- Added to NRHP: July 09, 1998

The Lake Quinault Lodge is a historic hotel on the southeast shore of Lake Quinault in the Olympic National Forest in Washington, US. The hotel was built in 1926 and designed by Robert Reamer, a Seattle architect, in a rustic style reminiscent of Reamer's work at the Old Faithful Inn in Yellowstone National Park. It is a notable example of a rustic wilderness lodging, suited to its woodland environment on the southern side of the Olympic Mountains.

== Design and construction ==
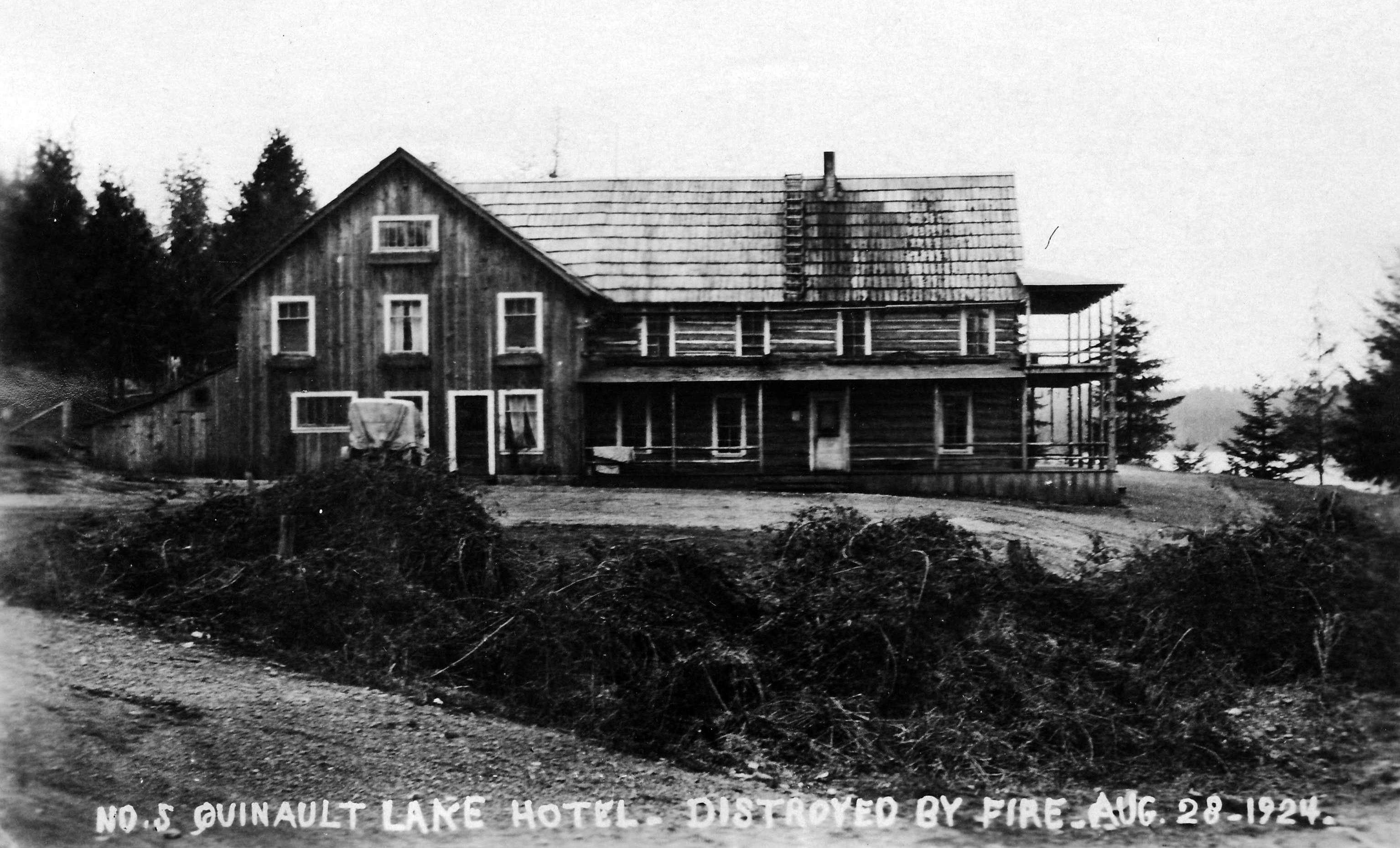
The original hotel burned in 1924

The two-story wood-frame structure replaced a previous building on the site that was built by Jack Ewell. Alfred and Ransom Higley bought it from Jack Ewell the original builder in 1905. Subsequently it was taken over from them by Herbert Olson in about 1907. The Olsons sold their interest in the first hotel to the Seaman family in 1921. On August 24, 1924, the original hotel burned.

Its replacement was funded by lumberman Ralph Emerson of Hoquiam, who bought out the Seamans. The first stage was a plain 1 1/2-story structure which still stands as the annex, restored in 2007. It became so popular that expansion was needed, and a new, more elaborate lodge was planned.

Robert Reamer was associated with the contractor, the Metropolitan Building Company, and the company's construction superintendent was Roy Garrison, who had previously worked with Reamer. Reamer had recently completed work on the Hotel Emerson in Hoquiam, and had extensive experience in the design of hotels in natural settings. Work started on June 9, 1926, and was complete fifty-three days later, on August 18, 1926.

Emerson sold the lodge in 1939. It closed during World War II. After the war it was operated by the Walker family. In 1988, the hotel was purchased by the Aramark corporation.

== Description ==
The Lake Quinault Lodge is an informal retreat, similar in nature to the Rosemary Inn and Singer's Tavern (also known as the Lake Crescent Lodge). The roughly V-shaped main lodge is centered on a lobby at the angle of the V, with a masonry fireplace as its focus, overlooking the lake. Dormers and a cupola in the steep roof emphasize the central wing. The hotel is a 2 1/2-story wood-frame structure clad in cedar shingles. The extremities of the wings project over sloping ground, creating a three-story facade at the ends. The walls of the upper floor project slightly outward from the ground floor, and are capped with a steeply-sloping roof housing an attic floor. Large expanses of windows face in either direction from the lobby. Two smaller 1 1/2-story wings extend from the reception side, framing the entrance court, with an entry porch at the end of one wing. The interior features expanses of smooth, finished timbers supporting the upper floor, which is itself finished timber. The chimney is decorated with a totem pole-shaped rain gauge that measures rainfall in feet.

The Lake Quinault Lodge was placed on the National Register of Historic Places on July 9, 1998.
