= Lake Quinault =

Lake in Grays Harbor County, Washington, USA

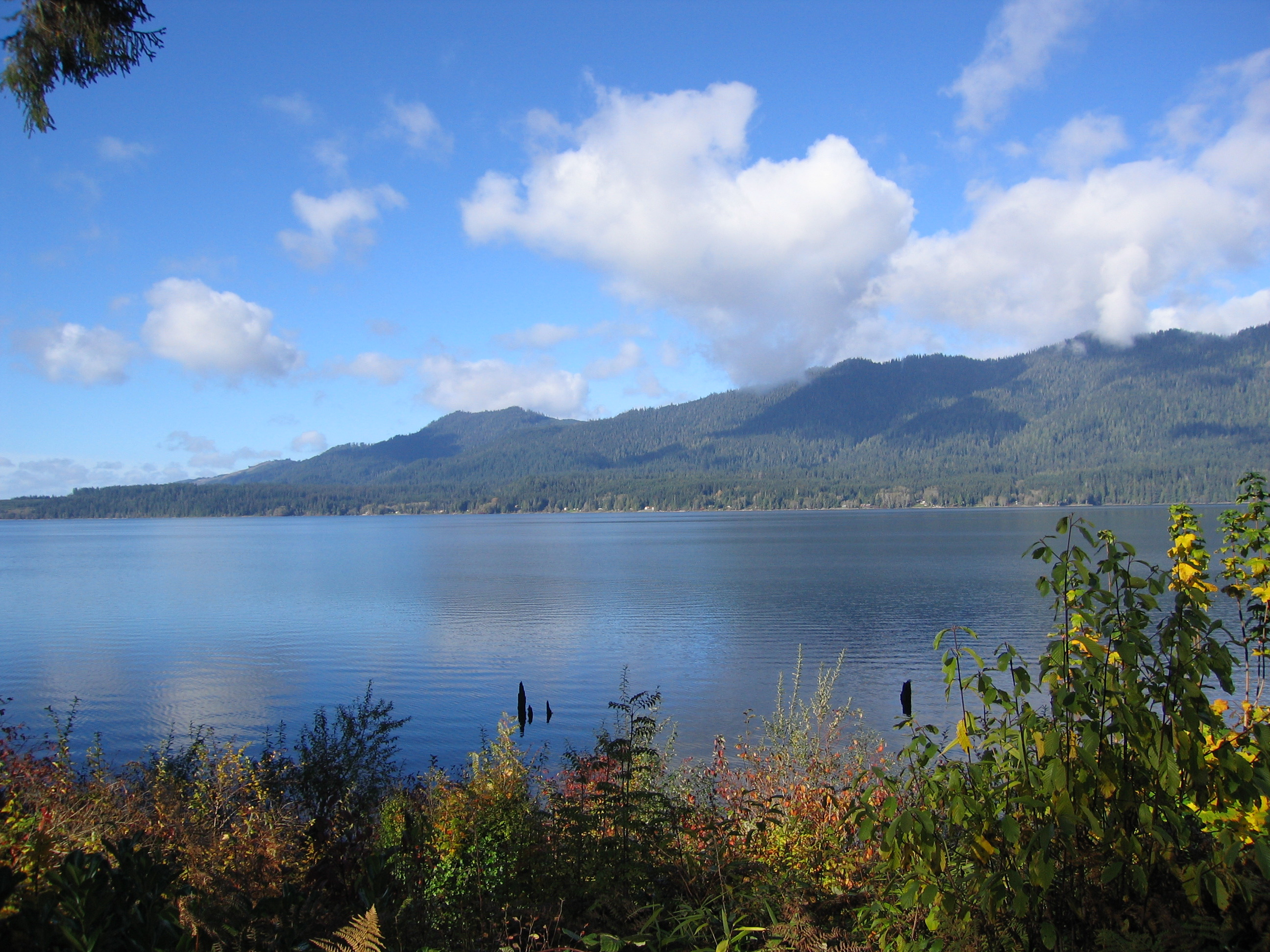

- Location within Washington (state) Location within the United States
- Location: Olympic Peninsula, Grays Harbor County, Washington, United States
- Coordinates: 47°28′34.96″N 123°52′12.59″W
- Primary inflows: Quinault River
- Primary outflows: Quinault River
- Basin countries: United States
- Max. length: 3.8 m (12 ft)
- Max. width: 2 m (6 ft 7 in)
- Surface elevation: 190 ft (58 m)
- Settlements: Amanda Park, Quinault

Lake Quinault (/kwɪˈnɒlt/ or /kwɪˈnɔːlt/) is a lake on the Olympic Peninsula in western Washington state. It is located in the glacial-carved Quinault Valley of the Quinault River, at the southern edge of Olympic National Park in the northwestern United States. One of the most dominant features of Lake Quinault is its location within the Quinault Rainforest, a temperate rain forest.

Lake Quinault is owned by the Quinault Indian Nation. The area is accessible from U.S. Route 101.

Area activities include fishing (with permit from the Quinaults), scenic drives (a loop around the lake is longer than 30 miles (48 km)), and hiking. The southern side of the lake features a system of short hiking trails maintained by the U.S. Forest Service that are accessible to casual day hikers.

The southern side of the lake is home to the historic Lake Quinault Lodge and the Rain Forest Resort Village and is encompassed by the Olympic National Forest. The Quinault Loop Trail on the south side of the lake and the nearby Quinault Rain Forest Interpretive Trail connecting campgrounds, trails, and the lodge, with excellent temperate rainforest viewing. Each trail was designated a National Recreation Trail in 1979. The north side of the lake is bordered mainly by private homes and some small resorts located in Olympic National Park.

Lake Quinault receives an average of 131 inches (330 cm) of precipitation per year.

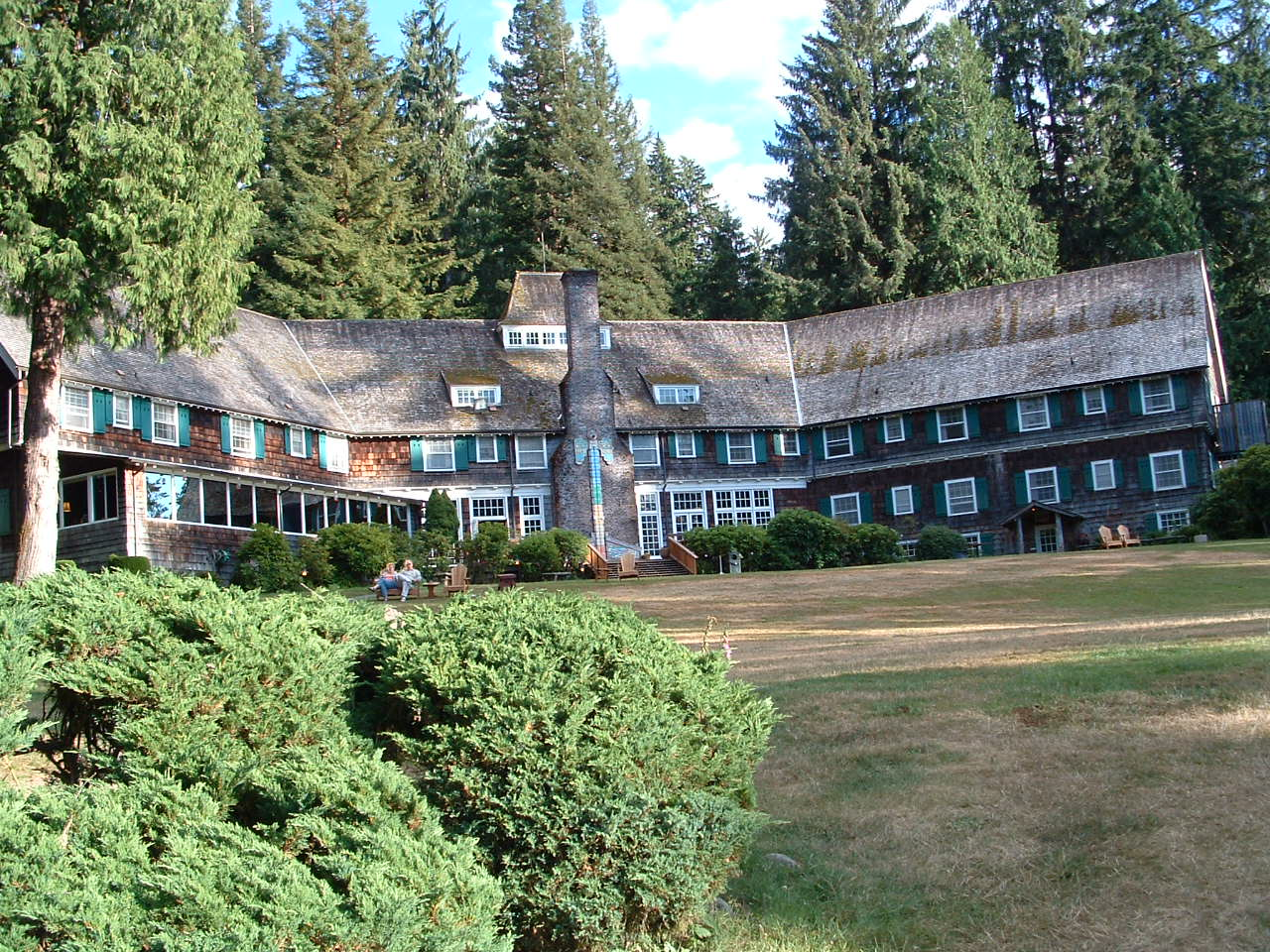
The Lake Quinault Lodge

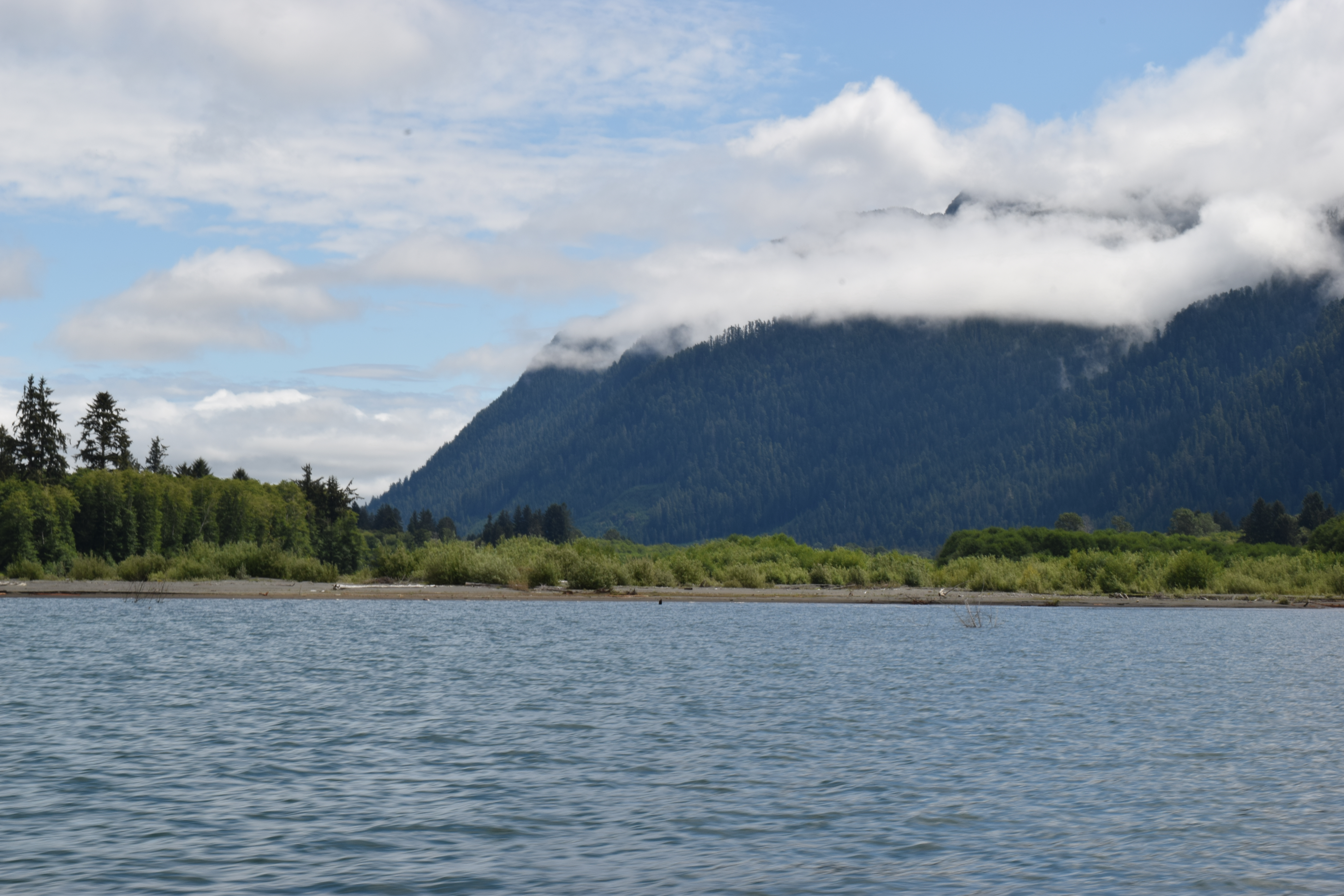
View from a boat in Lake Quinault on a sunny day

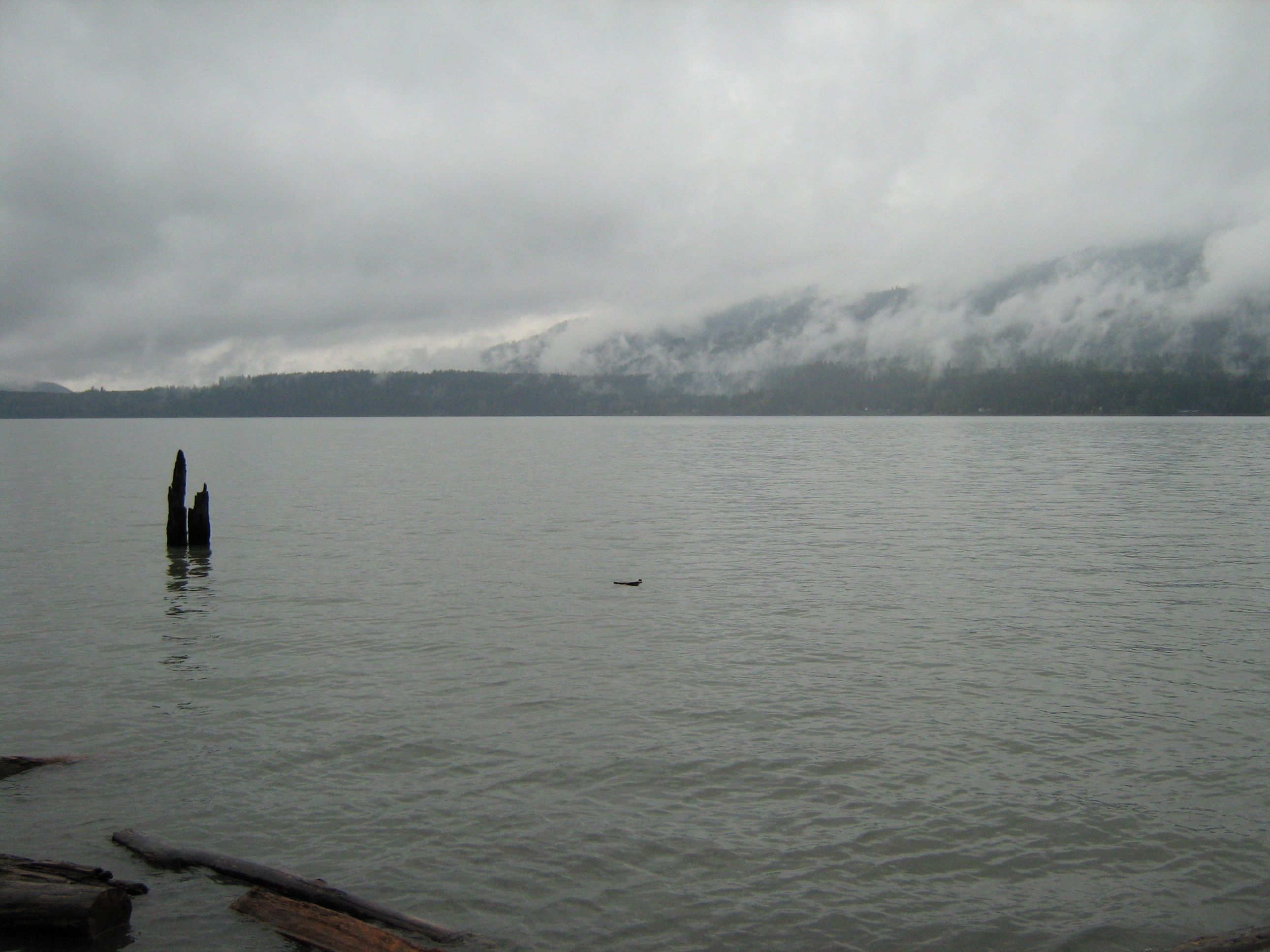
View from eastern shore

== See also ==
- Quinault River
- Quinault People
