= Spruce Railroad Trail =

Coordinates: 48°05′36″N 123°48′10″W

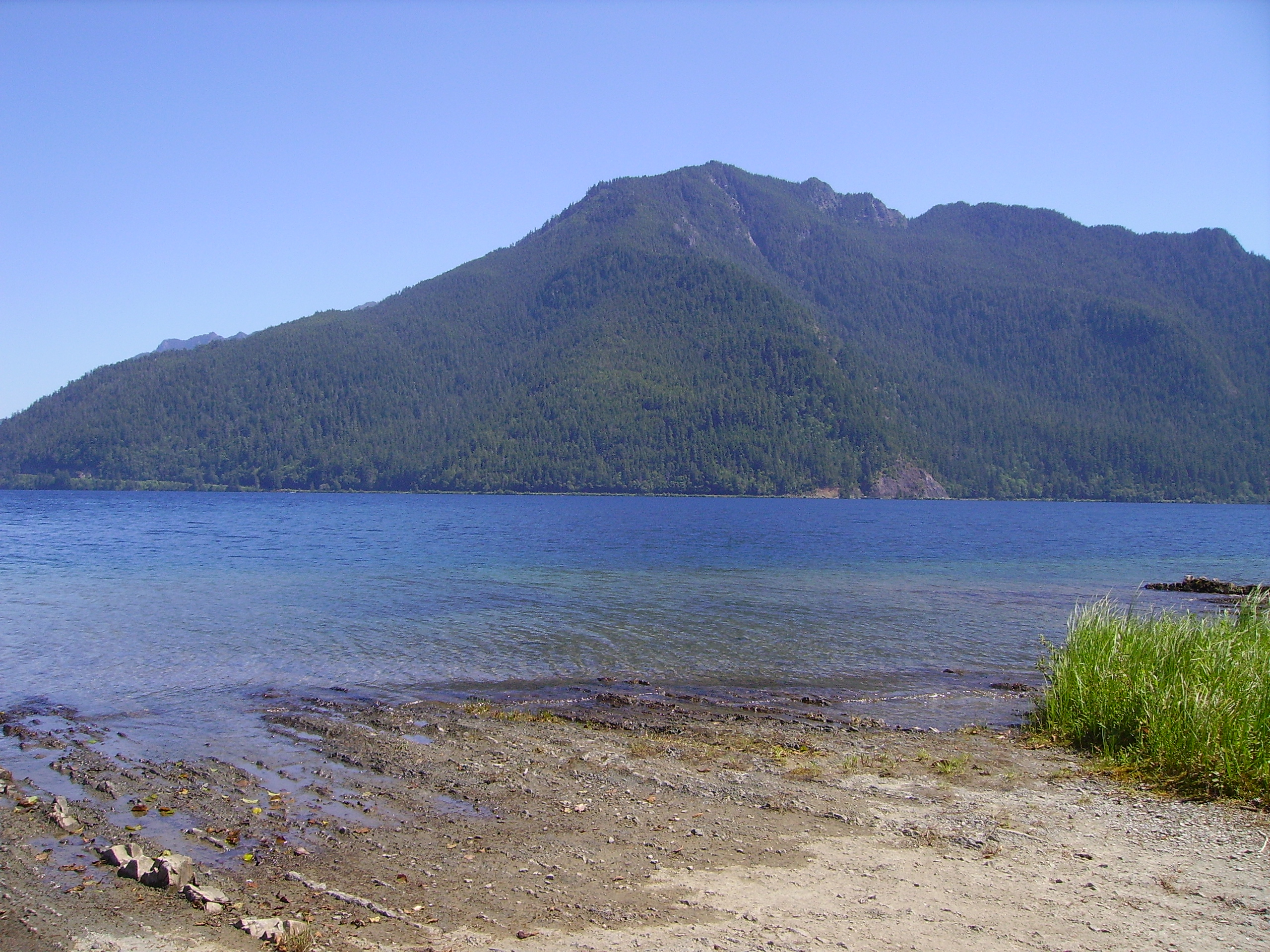
- View of Lake Crescent from Harrigan Point
- Length: 4 mi (6.4 km)
- Location: Olympic Peninsula, Clallam County, Washington, USA
- Use: Hiking/Biking
- Elevation change: ± 20 ft (6 m)
- Difficulty: Easy
- Season: Year round
- Sights: Lake Crescent
- Hazards: Ticks

The Spruce Railroad Trail (sometimes called Lake Crescent Trail) is a rail trail located on the shores of Lake Crescent about 20 miles (32 km) west of Port Angeles, Washington, and is part of the 134-mile-long Olympic Discovery Trail. The trail follows the former Port Angeles Western Railroad grade along the shores of Lake Crescent. Built during World War I for the Spruce Production Division to transport spruce from the western Olympic Peninsula for the aircraft industry, the railroad was completed in 1919, a year too late for its intended purpose; it was then abandoned in 1951. The trail is approximately 4 miles (6.4 km) one way, and trailheads exist at both ends. The trail is fairly level in most spots and could be hiked by most amateur hikers. Points of interest include the McFee Tunnel, a bridge that spans a bay called Devils Punch Bowl, and Harrigan Point.

From 2017 to 2019, the Spruce Railroad Trail was upgraded to universal accessibility standards. Some areas of the trail were paved, and widened to approximately 10 feet wide.

== McFee Tunnel ==
The McFee Tunnel is a railroad tunnel along the Spruce Railroad Trail which was blasted during World War I. Prior to its renovation, the tunnel was only accessible via off-trail access points, which were difficult to reach and largely unsafe. The tunnel itself was pitch-black and contained materials from when the railroad was being built, such as old railroad ties.

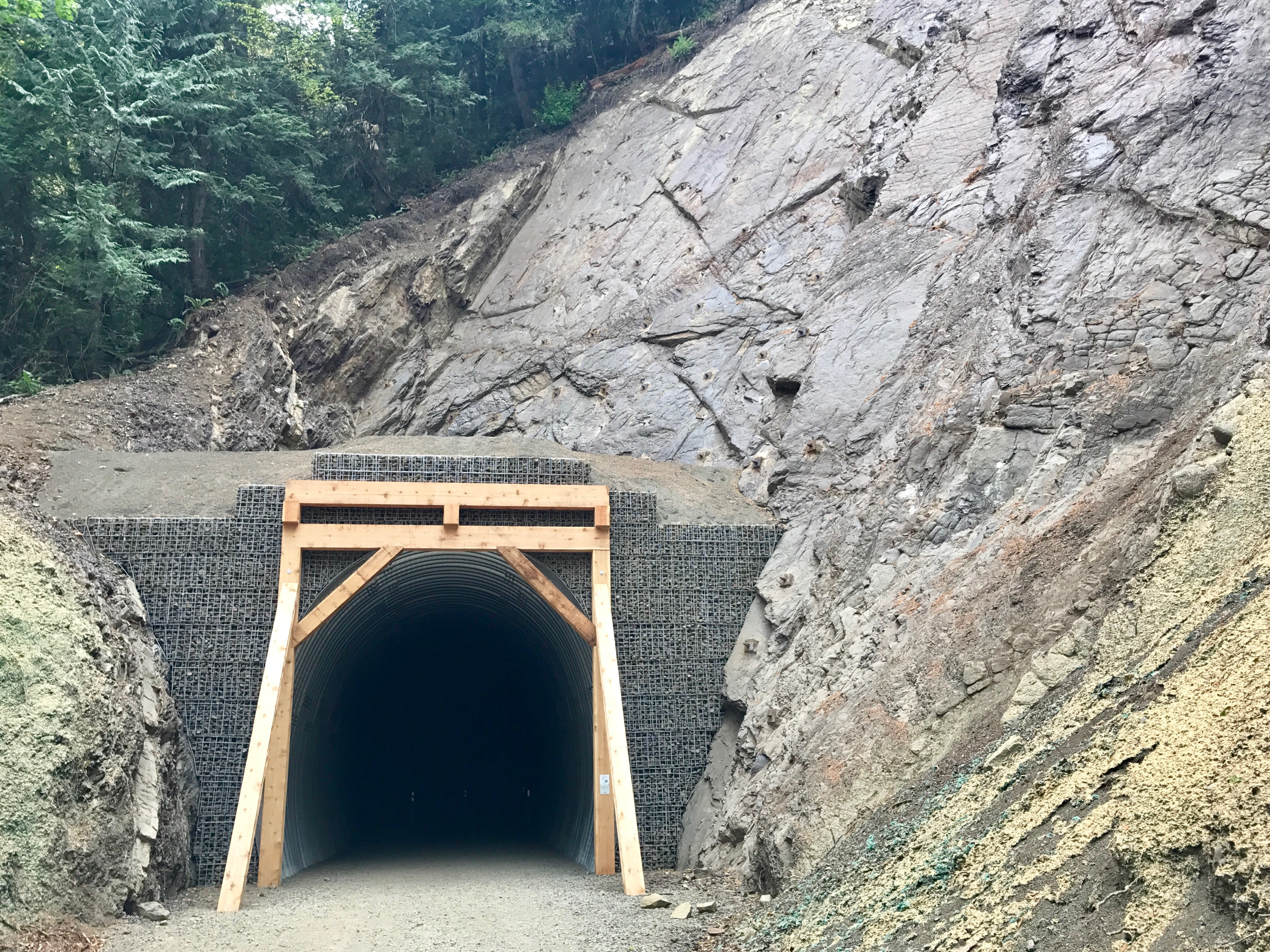
A view of the newly-reinforced McFee Tunnel entrance.

=== Renovation ===
In April 2017, Bruch and Bruch Construction of Port Angeles received a $1.2 million contract to restore the 450-foot long tunnel, and widen the trail segment to roughly 12 feet. This began with blasting the east end of the tunnel, opening it from end-to-end. Debris was then cleared from the tunnel, and workers began reinforcing the inside by applying "shotcrete" to the tunnel walls. Next, a Mechanically stabilized earth (MSE) wall was built around the arch pipe on the northeast entrance to the tunnel, with a facade added to represent the tunnel's original appearance.

The McFee Tunnel was officially opened to the public on July 15, 2017.

== Daley-Rankin Tunnel ==
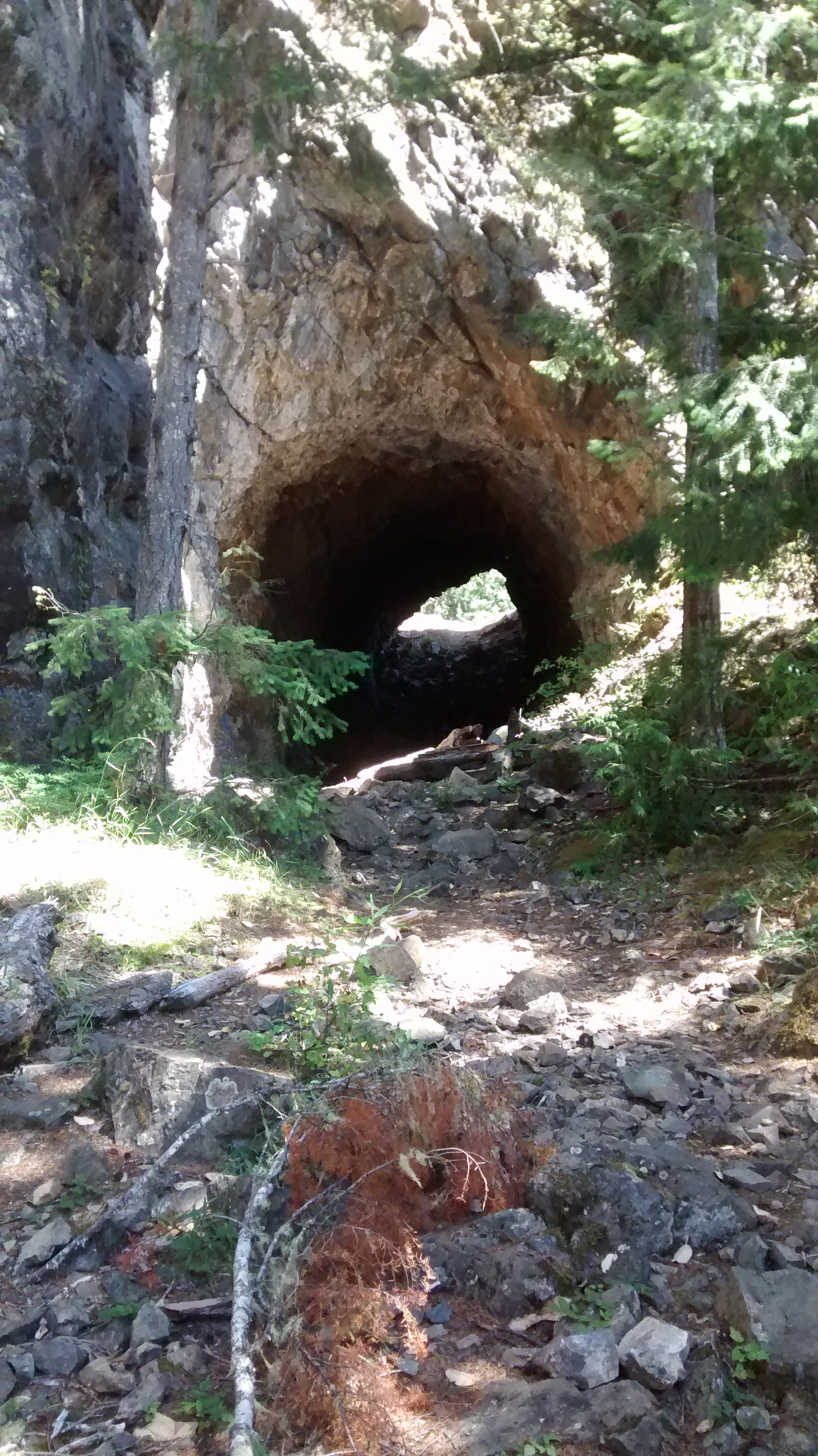
A view through the Daley-Rankin Tunnel in 2016, before renovations.

The Daley-Rankin Tunnel is a second, shorter railroad tunnel on the trail. Tradition has it that both tunnels were blasted closed and rendered dangerous to enter when railroad operations ceased. As part of a larger construction project that involved 10 miles of trail linked to the Olympic Discovery Trail, the Daley-Rankin Tunnel was finally reopened in late 2020. As a result, the full public trail is now open to hiking, bicycling, horseback riding, and wheelchair.
