= Rosemary Inn =

- U.S. National Register of Historic Places
- U.S. Historic district
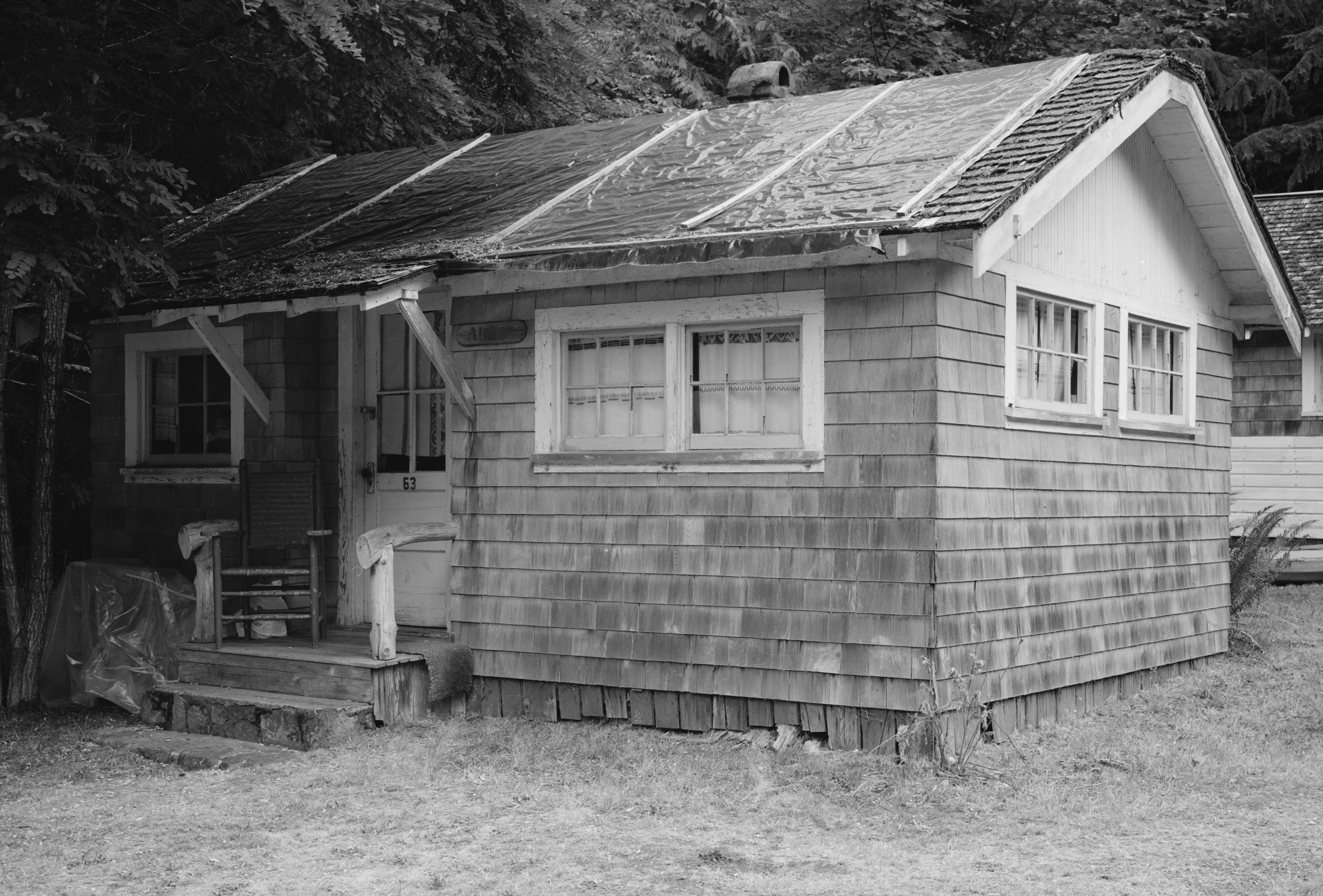

- Location within Washington (state)
- Location: East of Barnes Point, on south shore of Lake Crescent, about 17.2 miles (27.7 km) southwest of Port Angeles, in Olympic National Park
- Coordinates: 48°03′35″N 123°47′39″W
- Area: 4.5 acres (1.8 ha)
- Built: c. 1914
- Architect: John Daum
- NRHP reference No.: 79001033
- Added to NRHP: July 17, 1979

Rosemary Inn is a historic resort located at Barnes Point, on south shore of Lake Crescent, about 17.2 miles (27.7 km) southwest of Port Angeles, in Olympic National Park. The Rosemary Inn historic district comprises a 4.5 acres (1.8 ha) area and encompasses several historical structures built between 1914 and the mid-1930s. (Note: While the asset detail report it as a single property, NRHP form and additional documentation shows Rosemary Inn as a historic district.)

The main property of the district is the Rosemary inn lodge, a big frame structure located to the south of the meadow built by John Daum and opened in 1914 by Rose E. Littleton. Twelve guest log and wood-frame cabins, each one unique in design, and several other outbuildings, built between the 1920s and the 1930s, occupy the area north of the lodge.

The property was sold to the National Park Service in 1943. In 1946 the dedication of Olympic National Park was conducted at the lodge at Rosemary Inn. The National Park Concessions operated the restaurant until 1951. From 1951 until 1986, Rosemary Inn and its surrounding cabins were used by NPC as employee housing. From 1988, Rosemary Inn was operated by Olympic Park Institute, as an environmental education center. Olympic Park Institute was rebranded as NatureBridge.

The historical district was added to the National Register of Historic Places in 1979.

== Contributing Properties ==
The district comprises 16 contributing properties, built between 1914 and 1936:

- The Rosemary Inn Lodge, 48°03′34″N 123°47′39″W, built c. 1914.
- The Manager's Residence, 48°03′35″N 123°47′35″W, built early 1930s.
- The "Dreamerie" Cabin, 48°03′34″N 123°47′37″W, built early 1930s.
- The "Indiana" Cabin, 48°03′35″N 123°47′36″W, built c. 1933.
- The "Alabam" Cabin, 48°03′35″N 123°47′36″W, built mid 1920s.
- The "Honeysuckle" Cabin, 48°03′35″N 123°47′37″W, built late 1920s.
- The "Wren" Cabin, 48°03′35″N 123°47′37″W, built c. 1920.
- The "Red Wing" Cabin, 48°03′36″N 123°47′37″W, built late 1920s.
- The "Silver Moon" Cabin, 48°03′37″N 123°47′36″W, built late 1920s.
- The "Cara Mia" Cabin, 48°03′37″N 123°47′36″W, built mid 1920s.
- The "Dixie" Cabin, 48°03′38″N 123°47′36″W, built mid 1920s.
- The "Summerie" Cabin, 48°03′37″N 123°47′38″W, built c. 1920.
- The "Rock-A-Bye" Cabin, 48°03′37″N 123°47′40″W, built late 1920s.
- The "Dardanella" Cabin, 48°03′36″N 123°47′40″W, built 1932.
- The Fireplace Shelter, 48°03′37″N 123°47′39″W, built 1933.
- The Boathouse/Lumber Storage, 48°03′37″N 123°47′40″W, built 1936.
