= Quinault, Washington =

Unincorporated community in Washington, United States

Quinault
- Unincorporated place
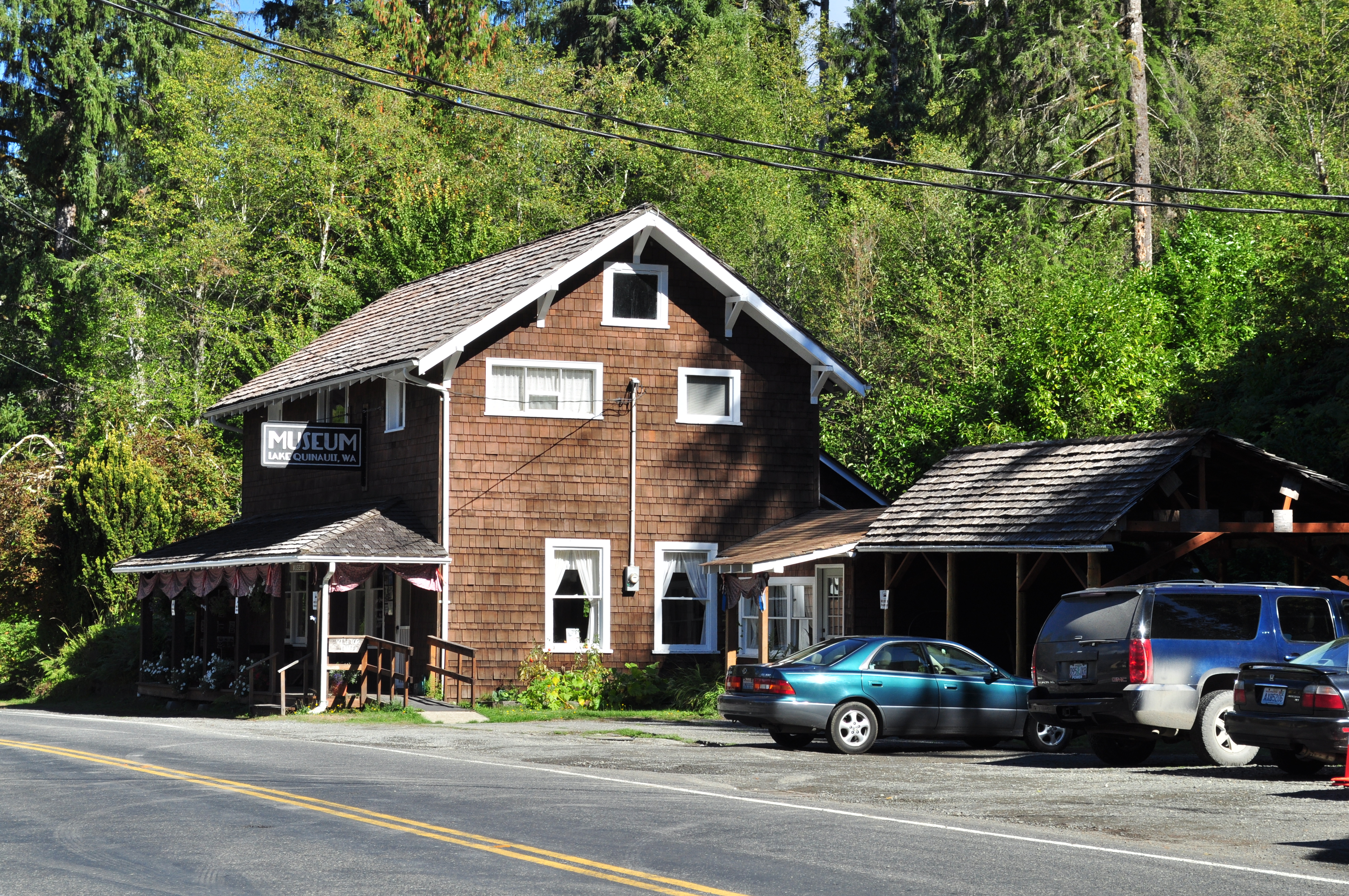
- Museum, Quinault, Washington, U.S.

- Location within Washington (state)
- Coordinates: 47°28′01″N 123°50′44″W
- Country: United States
- State: Washington
- County: Grays Harbor County
- Elevation: 308 ft (94 m)

Population (2020)
  - Total: 129
- ZIP code: 98575
- GNIS feature ID: 1524776

Quinault (/kwɪˈnɒlt/ or /kwɪˈnɔːlt/) is an unincorporated community in Grays Harbor County, Washington, United States. Quinault is located on the shores of Lake Quinault on the Olympic Peninsula.

Lake Quinault is the location of Lake Quinault Lodge, which is listed on the National Register of Historic Places.

== Climate ==
Quinault is on the windward side of the Olympic mountains, which gives it an oceanic climate (Köppen climate classification Cfb) with a very wet 3485 mm of precipitation falling each year. It is one of the wettest places in Washington state. Summers average about 17 °C and winters 3 degrees. Both are relatively mild. Summer has a significant drying trend as is common in the Pacific Northwest, but significant rain still falls. In the winter months there is some snow.

Climate data for Quinault, Washington
| Month | Jan | Feb | Mar | Apr | May | Jun | Jul | Aug | Sep | Oct | Nov | Dec | Year |
|---|---|---|---|---|---|---|---|---|---|---|---|---|---|
| Record high °F (°C) | 64 (18) | 68 (20) | 75 (24) | 88 (31) | 99 (37) | 102 (39) | 104 (40) | 100 (38) | 96 (36) | 82 (28) | 68 (20) | 63 (17) | 104 (40) |
| Mean daily maximum °F (°C) | 43.0 (6.1) | 46.8 (8.2) | 52.3 (11.3) | 58.4 (14.7) | 66.2 (19.0) | 69.7 (20.9) | 74.2 (23.4) | 74.3 (23.5) | 70.1 (21.2) | 59.3 (15.2) | 49.3 (9.6) | 44.3 (6.8) | 59.0 (15.0) |
| Daily mean °F (°C) | 38.4 (3.6) | 40.7 (4.8) | 44.3 (6.8) | 48.7 (9.3) | 55.1 (12.8) | 59.2 (15.1) | 62.9 (17.2) | 63.3 (17.4) | 60.0 (15.6) | 51.8 (11.0) | 44.1 (6.7) | 39.8 (4.3) | 50.7 (10.4) |
| Mean daily minimum °F (°C) | 33.8 (1.0) | 34.7 (1.5) | 36.4 (2.4) | 39.1 (3.9) | 44.1 (6.7) | 48.7 (9.3) | 51.7 (10.9) | 52.3 (11.3) | 49.8 (9.9) | 44.3 (6.8) | 38.9 (3.8) | 35.4 (1.9) | 42.4 (5.8) |
| Record low °F (°C) | 12 (−11) | 13 (−11) | 16 (−9) | 27 (−3) | 31 (−1) | 36 (2) | 38 (3) | 41 (5) | 34 (1) | 24 (−4) | 13 (−11) | 11 (−12) | 11 (−12) |
| Average precipitation inches (mm) | 20.95 (532) | 15.93 (405) | 15.17 (385) | 9.04 (230) | 5.44 (138) | 4.44 (113) | 3.07 (78) | 3.03 (77) | 6.16 (156) | 13.05 (331) | 17.59 (447) | 23.34 (593) | 137.21 (3,485) |
| Average snowfall inches (cm) | 7.2 (18) | 1.1 (2.8) | 2.7 (6.9) | 0.1 (0.25) | 0.0 (0.0) | 0.0 (0.0) | 0.0 (0.0) | 0.0 (0.0) | 0.0 (0.0) | 0.0 (0.0) | 0.2 (0.51) | 3.0 (7.6) | 14.3 (36.06) |
| Average precipitation days | 18 | 15 | 17 | 15 | 11 | 11 | 8 | 8 | 10 | 14 | 17 | 19 | 163 |
Source: https://wrcc.dri.edu/cgi-bin/cliMAIN.pl?waqurs
