= Betty Earles =

- Betty Earles on Lake Crescent, Washington, circa 1915

History
- Owner: Sol Duc Hot Springs Co. and others
- Launched: 1913
- In service: 1913
- Identification: US registry # 217896

General characteristics
- Tonnage: 28 gross; 23 regist.
- Length: 59.5 ft (18.14 m)
- Beam: 15.6 ft (4.75 m)
- Depth: 5.3 ft (1.62 m)
- Installed power: as built: gasoline engine, 80 hp (60 kW)
- Propulsion: propeller
- Crew: 4

Betty Earles was a small gasoline-powered vessel built in 1913 on Lake Crescent, Washington. The vessel was transferred to Puget Sound in about 1919 and remained in service there until at least 1958.

== Career ==
In 1913, Michael Earles, owner of the Sol Duc Hot Springs Resort, built the gasoline-launch Betty Earles (named after his daughter) on Lake Crescent to transport his guests bound for his resort from the head of the lake to Fairholm, at the western end, where they would disembark and ride motor buses to his resort. The boat was large for the lake, 65 ft (19.81 m) long, 15.6 ft (4.75 m) on the beam, with an 80 horsepower (60 kW) heavy-duty Frisco Standard engine.

Michael Earles' Sol Duc lodge burned down around 1918, and he moved Betty Earles off Lake Crescent to serve on Puget Sound under the command of Captain O. G. Olson. In 1924, Betty Earles was sold to Tacoma Tug & Barge Co. Betty Earles was still in service as a tug as late as 1958, still under the old name

== See also ==
- Storm King, a ferry operated on the lake by Clallam County, Washington.
- Steamboats of Lake Crescent, Washington
