= Barnes Creek (Washington) =

- Location of the mouth of Barnes Creek in Washington Barnes Creek (Washington) (the United States)

Location
- Country: United States
- State: Washington
- County: Clallam

Physical characteristics
- Source
  - coordinates: 48°01′00″N 123°40′51″W
- Mouth: Lake Crescent
  - coordinates: 48°03′22″N 123°48′04″W
  - elevation: 587 ft (179 m)

Also see Barnes Creek (Wisconsin)

Barnes Creek is a small stream that flows in the U.S. state of Washington from the base of Mount Storm King and Aurora Ridge into Lake Crescent. Barnes Creek is also fed by Marymere Falls. Barnes Creek sustains the spawning habitat for the endemic Crescenti cutthroat trout. It flows onto Barnes Point, an ancient landslide delta, and into Lake Crescent.

Barnes Creek and Barnes Point take their name from Paul Barnes, who settled at Barnes Point in 1890.
