= Ferries and steamboats of Lake Crescent, Washington =

Defunct ferry system in Washington state

Lake Crescent Ferry
- Ferry Storm King disembarking passengers at Piedmont on Lake Crescent
- Waterway: Lake Crescent, Washington
- Route: East Beach – Fairholm
- Authority: Clallam County, private owners
- Began operation: 1914
- Ended operation: 1922
- Successor: U.S. Route 101
- No. of vessels: multiple (Storm King and others)

Ferries and steamboats of Lake Crescent, Washington were used for water transport of passengers and freight before highways were built in the area in the early 1920s. Prior to highway construction, Lake Crescent was used as a route from Port Townsend into the northwestern part of the Olympic Peninsula. Ferries, steamboats and similar water craft were built and used on the lake until the Olympic Highway was completed along the south shore of the lake in 1922.

== Points accessed by water ==
=== Lake Crescent Lodge ===
Lake Crescent Lodge was originally known as Singer's Lake Crescent Tavern, built by Avery J and Julia Singer in the early part of the last century. The ferries on the lake ran to points west from the East Beach dock near the tavern.

=== Ovington's Resort ===
Ovington's was located along the north shore of Lake Crescent, near the modern North Shore picnic area. Built by Edward J. "Ned" Ovington and his wife Emily in 1905, it was one of the most popular resorts on the lake. Guests to Ovington's first arrived by boat, before the construction of the north shore road.

=== Marymere Hotel ===
The Barnes family built the Marymere Hotel in 1906. It was located at Barnes Point at the narrowest part of the lake, on the south shore, at the base of Mount Storm King. Until the road was built on the shore of the lake, guests of the Marymere arrived by boat. The hotel burned down around 1914.

== Construction and operations ==
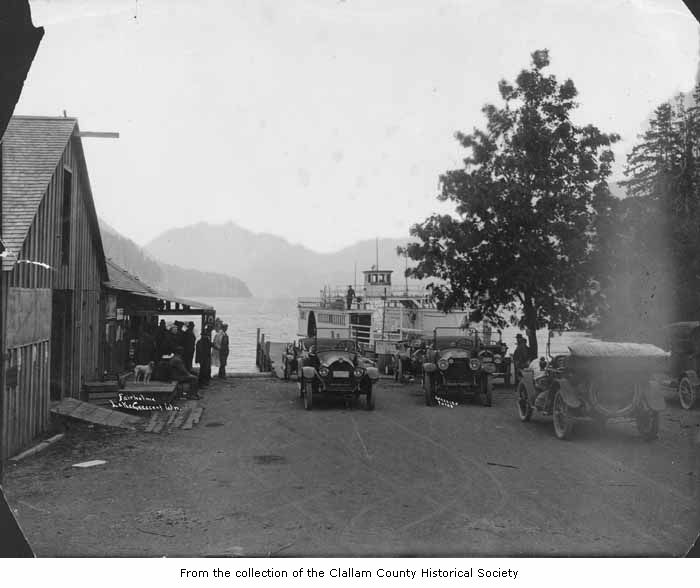
Storm King at Fairholm in 1918

The first powered boat on Lake Crescent was the Lady of the Lake built by Paul Barnes and launched in 1891. It served a route between Fairholm and Piedmont. A faster steamer named The Flyer arrived on the lake in 1893.

In 1913, Michael Earles, owner of the Sol Duc Hot Springs Resort, built on Lake Crescent the gasoline-launch Betty Earles (named after his daughter) to take guests bound for his lodge from the head of the lake to Fairholm, at the western end, where they would disembark and ride motor buses up to his resort. The boat was large for the lake, 65' long, 16.5' on the beam, with an 80 horsepower (60 kW) heavy-duty Frisco Standard engine.

The next year, 1914, Captain O.D. Treiber designed for Clallam County the gasoline-powered side wheel ferry Marjory, which was 65' long, 27' on the beam, and powered by an 18 horsepower (13 kW) Field engine. Marjory was operated on the same route as the Betty Earles, and had a capacity of seven automobiles and 50 passengers.

Treiber designed another, larger ferry for the Lake Crescent service. This was Storm King, named after a mountain overlooking the lake. Like Marjory, Storm King was a sidewheeler, but much larger. On deck, she was 112' long and measured 31.5' on the beam across her wheels. (Her hull measurements were 90' long, 20.5' on the beam.) Storm King, powered by a 40 horsepower (30 kW) Fairbanks-Morse engine, was probably the largest vessel ever on Lake Crescent. She could carry 21 automobiles and 150 passengers, exactly triple the capacity of Marjory.

Michael Earles’ Sol Duc lodge burned down around 1918, and he moved Betty Earles off Lake Crescent to serve on Puget Sound under the command of Captain O. G. Olson. Later, in 1924, Betty Earles was sold to Tacoma Tug & Barge Co. Remarkably, Betty Earles was still in service as a tug as late as 1958, still under her old name.

Lake Crescent also supported its own little fleet of steam and gasoline launches, with idyllic or at least speedy-sounding names: Lady of the Lake, Olympus, Greyhound, and Flyer.
