= East Beach =

East Beach may refer to:

== Places ==
- East Beach, Washington, a community near Olympic National Park in the United States
- East Beach (Santa Barbara), a coastal area in California, United States
- East Beach State Beach, a recreation area in Rhode Island, United States
- East Beach Station, a Coast Guard facility in St. Simons, Georgia, United States

== Organizations ==
- East Beach Cafe, a restaurant in Littlehampton, West Sussex, United Kingdom

== See also ==
- Cedar Lake East Beach, a park area in Minneapolis, United States
- Selsey, East Beach, a geological site in West Sussex, United Kingdom
