= Lyre River =

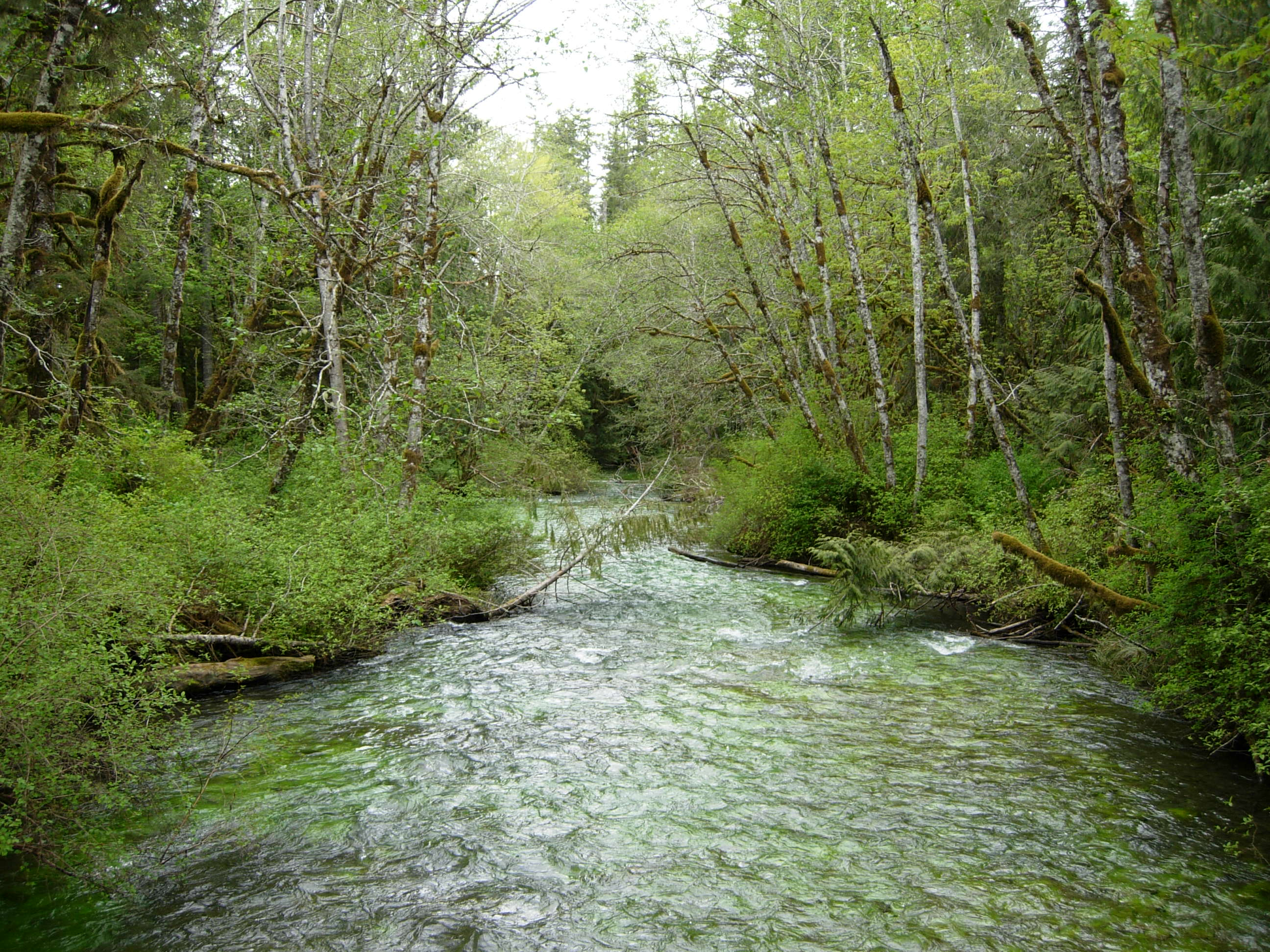
- The Lyre River as it flows out of Lake Crescent

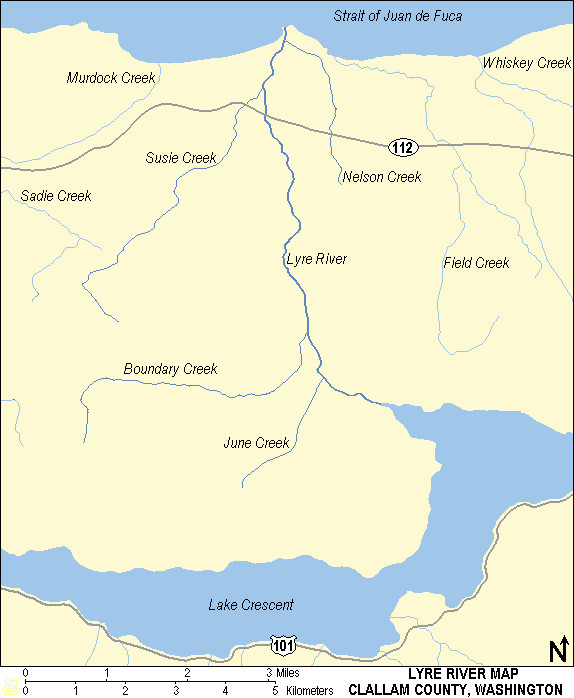

Location
- Country: United States
- State: Washington
- County: Clallam

Physical characteristics
- Source: Lake Crescent
  - location: Olympic National Park
  - coordinates: 48°5′40″N 123°48′17″W
  - elevation: 586 ft (179 m)
- Mouth: Strait of Juan de Fuca
  - coordinates: 48°9′38″N 123°49′43″W
  - elevation: 0 ft (0 m)
- Length: 5.2 mi (8.4 km)
- Basin size: 67.5 sq mi (175 km^{2})
- Discharge
  - location: near Shadow
  - average: 366 cu ft/s (10.4 m^{3}/s)

Basin features
- Tributaries
  - left: June Creek, Boundary Creek (Lyre River)|Boundary Creek, Susie Creek
  - right: Nelson Creek (Lyre River)|Nelson Creek

The Lyre River in the U.S. state of Washington flows out of Lake Crescent in the Olympic National Park and into the Strait of Juan de Fuca. Originally referred to as "singing waters" by the Indians living near it, the river was first named Rio de Cuesta by Europeans in 1790 by Gonzalo López de Haro, but was later called River Lyre after being charted by Captain Henry Kellett in 1847.

== Course ==
The Lyre River flows roughly northwest out of Lake Crescent, first encountering June Creek, then turning north at the point that is joined by Boundary Creek on the left. At River Mile 2.7 (48.12348°N 123.82684°W) the river tumbles down the Lyre River Falls, which are impassable to fish migrating upstream. Continuing north, the river is joined by Susie Creek on the left, and finally Nelson Creek on the right before emptying into the Strait of Juan de Fuca at Low Point.

== Ecology ==
The first few hundred feet of the river as it flows out of the lake provide spawning habitat for the Beardslee trout (Oncorhynchus mykiss irideus f. beardsleei), which is found nowhere else. Below the falls that are 3 miles (5 km) upriver from the mouth, the river supports stocks of coastal cutthroat trout, as well as winter and summer steelhead.

== History ==
The Makah tribe considered the Lyre to be their eastern boundary, though members of the Elwha Klallam tribe had settlements along the river as well, including the fishing village of Kwahamish.

By the early 1890s, John Smith had taken up a claim at Piedmont; John Hanson and his wife Mary Laeger Hanson had homesteaded near the head of the Lyre River. From 1889 through the 1920s, there was a settlement named Gettysburg on the east side of the mouth of the river. Gettysburg was founded as a logging town by Robert Getty and had a population of 65 in 1910. It also had a post office.

The Lyre River Campground is administered by the Washington Department of Natural Resources near the mouth of the river.

== See also ==
- List of rivers of Washington (state)
