= Storm King (ferry) =

- Storm King on Lake Crescent, Washington.

History
- Name: Storm King
- Owner: Clallam County
- Out of service: 1922

General characteristics
- Length: 112 ft (34.14 m) over deck; 90 ft (27.43 m) over hull.
- Beam: 31.5 ft (9.60 m)over wheels; 20.5 ft (6.25 m) over hull
- Depth: 5.3 ft (1.62 m)
- Installed power: gasoline engine, 80 hp (60 kW)
- Propulsion: sidewheels
- Capacity: 21 automobiles, 150 passengers.

Storm King was a gasoline-powered sidewheel-driven ferry built in 1915 on Lake Crescent, Washington.

== Career ==
Captain O.D. Treiber designed Storm King for Clallam County's ferry route on Lake Crescent, Washington.

Storm King was named after a mountain overlooking the lake. Storm King was driven by sidewheels.. On deck, the vessel was 112' long and measured 31.5' on the beam across the sidewheels. (The hull measurements were 90' long, 20.5' on the beam.) Storm King, powered by a 40 horsepower (30 kW) Fairbanks-Morse engine, was probably the largest vessel ever on Lake Crescent. The ferry had a capacity of 21 automobiles and 150 people.

Ferry traffic on Lake Crescent ended in 1922 with the completion of the Olympic Highway along the south side of the lake.

== See also ==
- Betty Earles
- Steamboats of Lake Crescent, Washington
