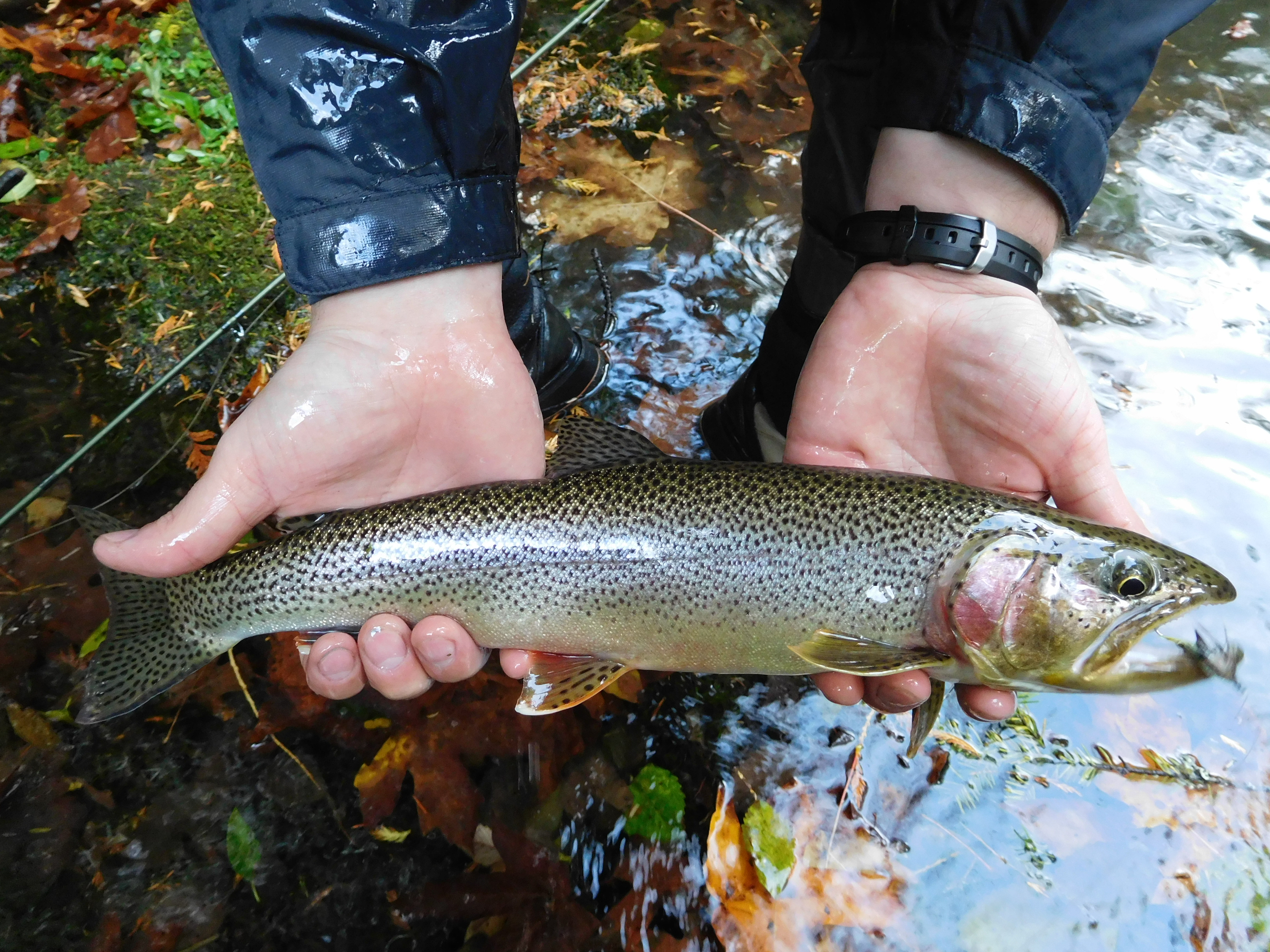

Scientific classification
- Domain: Eukaryota
- Kingdom: Animalia
- Phylum: Chordata
- Class: Actinopterygii
- Order: Salmoniformes
- Family: Salmonidae
- Genus: Oncorhynchus
- Species: O. clarkii
- Subspecies: O. c. clarkii
- Population: Lake Crescent cutthroat trout

Synonyms
- Oncorhynchus clarkii clarkii f. crescenti; Oncorhynchus clarkii crescenti

= Lake Crescent cutthroat trout =

North American freshwater fish

The Crescenti cutthroat trout or the Lake Crescent cutthroat trout is a North American freshwater fish, a local form (f. loc.) of the coastal cutthroat trout (Oncorhynchus clarkii clarkii) isolated in Lake Crescent in Washington. While previously attributed to a distinct subspecies Oncorhynchus clarkii crescenti, it is not currently recognized at the subspecies rank. However the cutthroat trout of Lake Crescent do remain distinct. They have the highest known gill raker and vertebrae counts of any coastal cutthroat population. The cutthroat are believed to have been isolated in Lake Crescent after a landslide blocked the eastern outflow of the lake.

Before the introduction of non-native trout to the lake, these fish co-existed with the lake's population of coastal rainbow trout known as Beardslee trout. The cutthroat mostly used the lake's inlet stream Barnes Creek for spawning, while the rainbow trout used the Lyre River for spawning. However, in the early 1980s a small cutthroat population was found in the Lyre River that spawns further downstream than the native rainbow trout. Today the cutthroat of Barnes Creek have been hybridized with introduced rainbow into cutbows, but Crescenti cutthroat trout persist in the Lyre River as a genetically pure population (Behnke 1992). A Crescenti cutthroat caught in 1961 set the state record for cutthroats at 32 inches (81 cm) and 12 pounds (5.4 kg).
