= Barnes Point =

Coordinates: 48°03′40″N 123°47′45″W

Barnes Point is an ancient landslide delta that juts out into Lake Crescent in Clallam County, Washington. As one of the few areas of relatively flat ground near Lake Crescent, it hosts Lake Crescent Lodge, the Storm King Ranger Station of Olympic National Park, as well as several private homes. It also contains the trails which access Mount Storm King, Marymere Falls, and Barnes Creek. Barnes Creek flows through an old-growth forest, providing spawning habitat for the endemic Crescent cutthroat trout. The ten acres of land between Rosemary Inn and Lake Crescent Lodge were owned by businessman Thomas Aldwell until 1940. There was a main house, three guest cabins, a work shed, and a horse barn. The property was purchased in 1942 by James C deWilde, a retired Dutch banker from Shanghai. His wife's father was from India where he served as Colonel of the Bengal Lancers. During his time at Barnes point, deWilde wrote two books about the resurgence of Islam in Asia. Two other authors also lived at Barnes Point. Margaret Merrill wrote the classic "Bears in my Kitchen" and her husband Bill (a park ranger) published a guide to fishing and camping. Bill Merrill was the first ranger to wear side arms and Native Americans gave him the moniker "two gun." During World War II deWilde served as the blackout warden in case of enemy action. Emil deWilde and his new wife came to Barnes Point from the Netherlands in 1947. Emil had served in the Dutch underground during the war and had been captured and tortured by the Nazis. His health was poor due to starvation and the extreme quiet was helpful for emotional recovery. Emil and his father started Lake Crescent Nursery on the site. By 1949, 13 people lived on the property including a nanny from Scotland, field hands from Oklahoma, and the two families. In 1953 the Park service purchased the property and the house and barn were demolished. Two of the cabins were floated across the lake to Log Cabin resort where they remain in use to this day.

Barnes Point and Barnes Creek take their name from Paul Barnes, who settled at the point in 1890.
