= East Beach, Washington =

Unincorporated community in Washington, United States

East Beach, Clallam County, Washington
- Unincorporated community
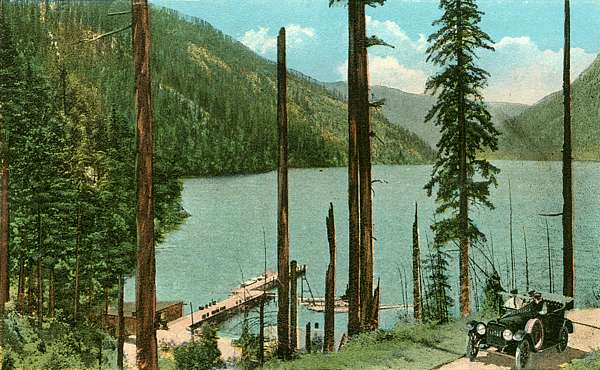
- East Beach road and ferry dock, 1916

- Location within the state of Washington
- Coordinates: 48°05′05″N 123°44′39″W
- Country: United States
- State: Washington
- County: Clallam
- Time zone: UTC-8 (Pacific (PST))
  - Summer (DST): UTC-7 (PDT)

East Beach was an unincorporated community in Clallam County, Washington, United States. The community is located at the east end of Lake Crescent in the Olympic National Park.

== History ==
In the 1890s a wagon road was built from Port Angeles to the eastern end of Lake Crescent. In 1914 a ferry service was established on the lake to carry persons from the ferry dock at East Beach to Fairholm, Washington twelve miles away on the western end of the lake.. In 1922 the ferry service became unnecessary because of the completion of the Olympic Highway on the south shore of Lake Crescent. In the 1920s there was a small resort at East Beach called the East Beach Hotel. This was constructed by Frank P. Fisher who later sold it to William and Betty Lenoir. They expanded the hotel, and later relocated their business to Fairholm, and the original East Beach Hotel no longer exists.
