= Mount Storm King =

Mountain in Washington (state), United States

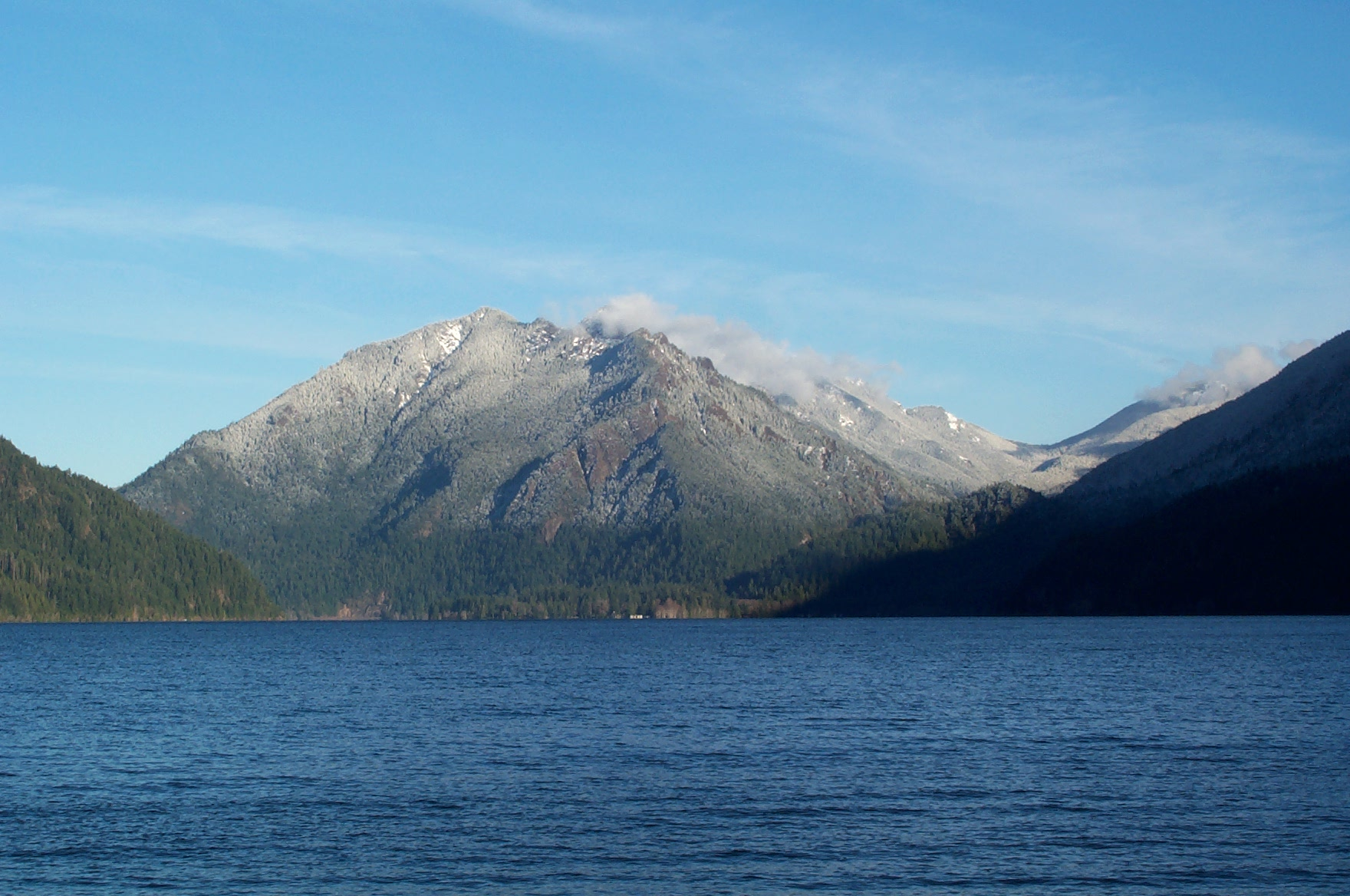

Highest point
- Elevation: 4,500+ ft (1,370+ m) NGVD 29
- Prominence: 750 ft (230 m)
- Coordinates: 48°03′21″N 123°44′27″W

Geography
- Location within Washington (state) Location within the United States
- Location: Clallam County, Washington, U.S.
- Parent range: Olympic Mountains
- Topo map: USGS Lake Sutherland

Climbing
- Easiest route: Mount Storm King trail, class 3

Mount Storm King is located within the Olympic National Park about 20 miles (32 km) west of Port Angeles, Washington, in the United States. The mountain is located on the south side of Lake Crescent near Barnes Point, and has an elevation of 4,500+ feet (1,370+ m).

The trail to the summit starts near the Storm King Ranger Station, and initially follows the trail to Marymere Falls but branches to the north after a short distance. The first 1.9 miles (3.1 km) is on maintained trail but the rest of the climb involves scrambling on loose rock with some exposure.

Lake Crescent seen from the summit trail in June 2006. The Strait of Juan de Fuca is in the background, just over 7 miles (11 km) distant.

== Legend ==
Klallum tribe legend tells an origin story of Mount Storm King being angered by fighting tribes at his feet and broke a boulder from his peak, throwing it at the warriors, killing them and cutting Tsulh-mut in two creating Lake Crescent and Lake Sutherland.

== History ==
Scientists have found evidence that sometime around 1100 BCE an earthquake triggered the 7,200,000-cubic-meter (9,400,000 cu yd) Sledgehammer Point Rockslide, which fell from Mount Storm King and entered Lake Crescent in waters at least 140 meters (459 ft) deep, generating a megatsunami in the lake with an estimated maximum run-up height of 82 to 104 meters (269 to 341 ft).
