= Kloshe Nanitch Lookout =

- Interactive map of the Kloshe Nanitch Lookout area

General information
- Type: Historic Fire Lookout
- Location: Olympic National Forest
- Coordinates: 48°04′51.24″N 124°04′44.76″W
- Construction started: 1920s
- Completed: 1920S

Kloshe Nanitch Lookout was built in the 1920s as a look out to spot fires in the Lake Crescent area of the Olympic Peninsula, Washington. The current structure is a replica of this structure, providing views of Lake Crescent, Mount Olympus (Washington), Lake Pleasant (Washington), and the Sol Duc Valley. It is located within the Olympic National Forest. The site has picnic tables, vault toilet and garbage facilities. There is no water available at the site.

Motto: Kloshe Nanitch (Keep a good lookout or ever watch).

In October 2012, the replica lookout was removed due to heavy vandalism and a lack of money to restore it. It was constructed in 1997 and many people believe that it wasn't very well built to begin with. Even though the structure has been removed, the area is maintained as a viewpoint.
