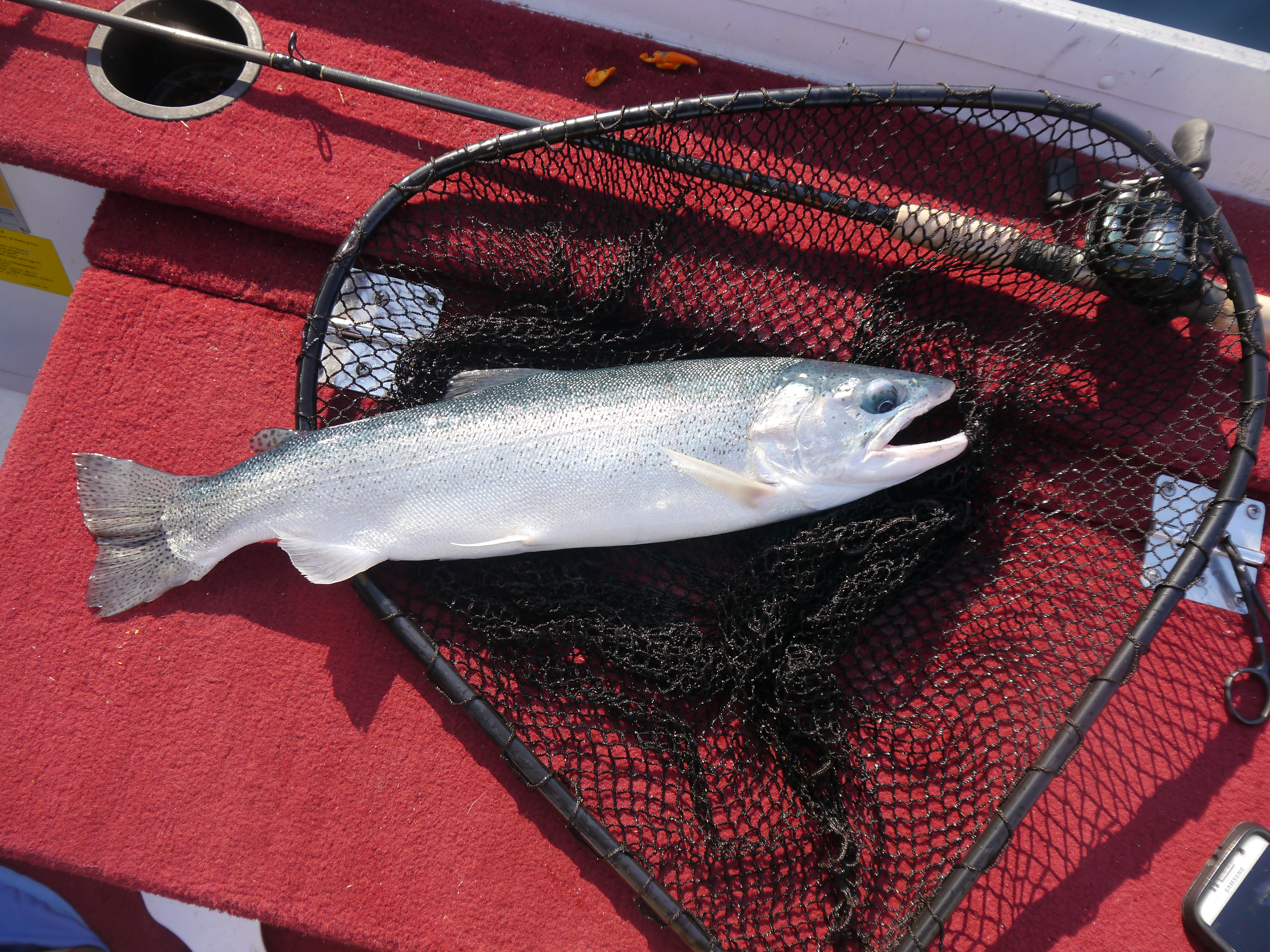

Scientific classification
- Kingdom: Animalia
- Phylum: Chordata
- Class: Actinopterygii
- Order: Salmoniformes
- Family: Salmonidae
- Genus: Oncorhynchus
- Species: O. mykiss
- Subspecies: O. m. irideus (but see text)
- Form: O. m. i. f. beardsleei

Trinomial name
- Oncorhynchus mykiss irideus f. beardsleei

Synonyms
- Oncorhynchus mykiss beardsleei (but see text); Salmo gairdneri beardsleei

= Beardslee trout =

Freshwater fish

The Beardslee trout (Oncorhynchus mykiss irideus f. beardsleei) is a local form of rainbow trout endemic to Lake Crescent in the Pacific north-western US state of Washington. Some sources treat them as a subspecies.

Known to locals as "bluebacks", Beardslee trout are found nowhere else, and spawn in the Lyre River, near the outlet of the lake. Beardslee are somewhat difficult to distinguish from the Lake Crescent cutthroat trout, which is also endemic to Lake Crescent, as they only take on the rainbow colors during spawning.

The spawning grounds of the Beardslee (considered the rarest salmonid in the Olympic National Park) are severely threatened by siltation, and the degradation of logjams in the river used as spawning grounds.

Responding to a proposal from Washington Trout, Olympic National Park has announced an emergency change to fishing regulations on Lake Crescent. On May 24 (2002), Park Superintendent David Morris announced that Lake Crescent and all its tributaries will be open for catch and release angling only. The rule change prohibits the use of down riggers, and requires that anglers use only artificial lures with single barbless hooks and no more than two ounces of weight. The emergency rule took effect June 1, the day the lake opened for fishing.

The new rules are designed to protect Lake Crescent's population of Beardslee rainbow trout, which has declined to a critically low level. Beardslee trout are a unique form of rainbow trout, native to Lake Crescent, and found nowhere else on earth. They spawn in late winter and early spring in only one small area of the Lyre River, near the outlet of the lake. Washington Trout conducted independent spawning surveys on the Lyre this past spring and found alarming evidence of very low numbers of spawning fish, indicating that the population has experienced a severe decline. This evidence was supported by counts made by Park Service crews that officially counted only 35 spawning redds (slightly higher than WT's count), the lowest number since official redd counts were begun in 1989.
