= Storm King Ranger Station =

- U.S. National Register of Historic Places
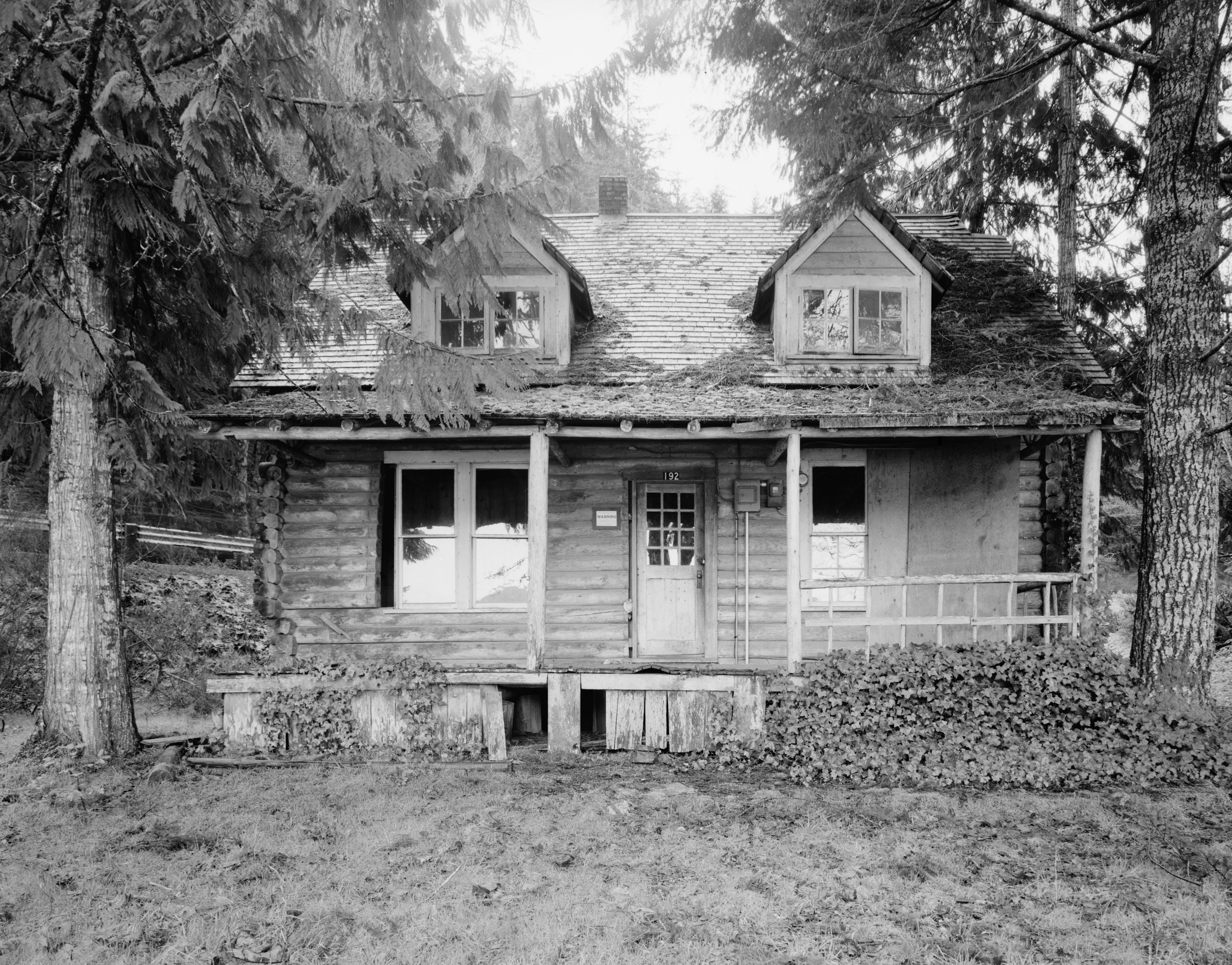

- Location within Washington (state) Location within the United States
- Location: Southeast of Barnes Point, on south shore of Lake Crescent, about 17 miles (27 km) southwest of Port Angeles, in Olympic National Park
- Coordinates: 48°03′28″N 123°47′19″W
- Area: less than one acre
- Built: 1905
- Architect: U.S. Forest Service
- MPS: Olympic National Park MPS
- NRHP reference No.: 07000730
- Added to NRHP: July 13, 2007

The Storm King Ranger Station, also known as the Storm King Guard Station and Morgenroth Cabin, is a historic building located southeast of Barnes Point, on south shore of Lake Crescent, about 17 miles (27 km) southwest of Port Angeles, Washington. The ranger station is part of the Olympic National Park. The station was added to the National Register of Historic Places in 2007.

The building was remodeled in 1937 and in 1979 the east wall and chimney were destroyed when a tractor loader broke loose and hit the building. In 1984 the building was relocated a short distance away from the Olympic Highway (SR-101) and the shore of Lake Crescent, and extensive deterioration was found in many of the exterior logs which were completely restored.

The building is significant also for its connection with Chris Morgenroth, an early Bogachiel River settler and one of the first Forest Service Rangers in Olympic Peninsula, who became district ranger of the Olympic National Forest and an advocate for the creation of the Olympic National Park.

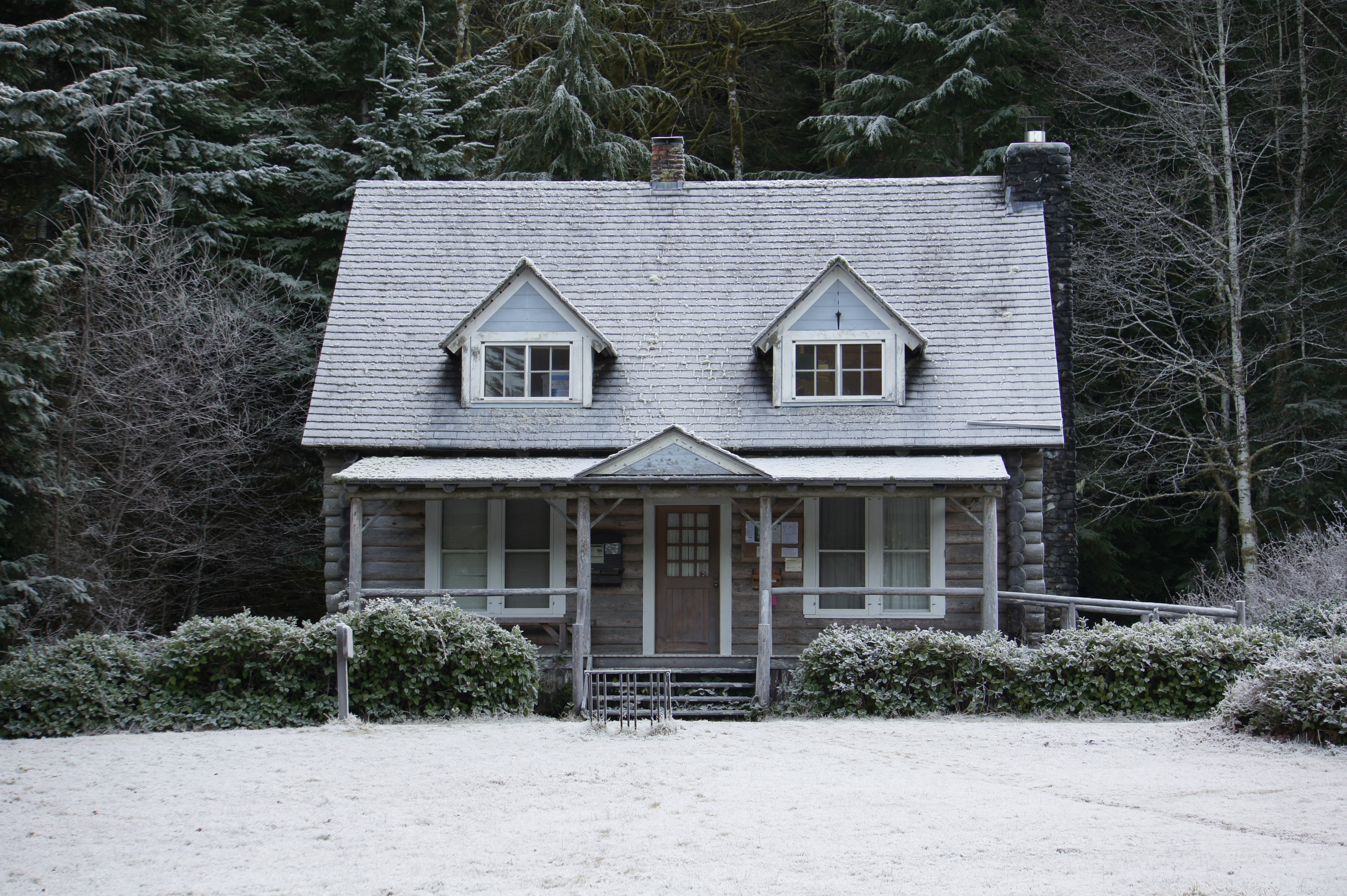
Storm King Ranger Station in winter

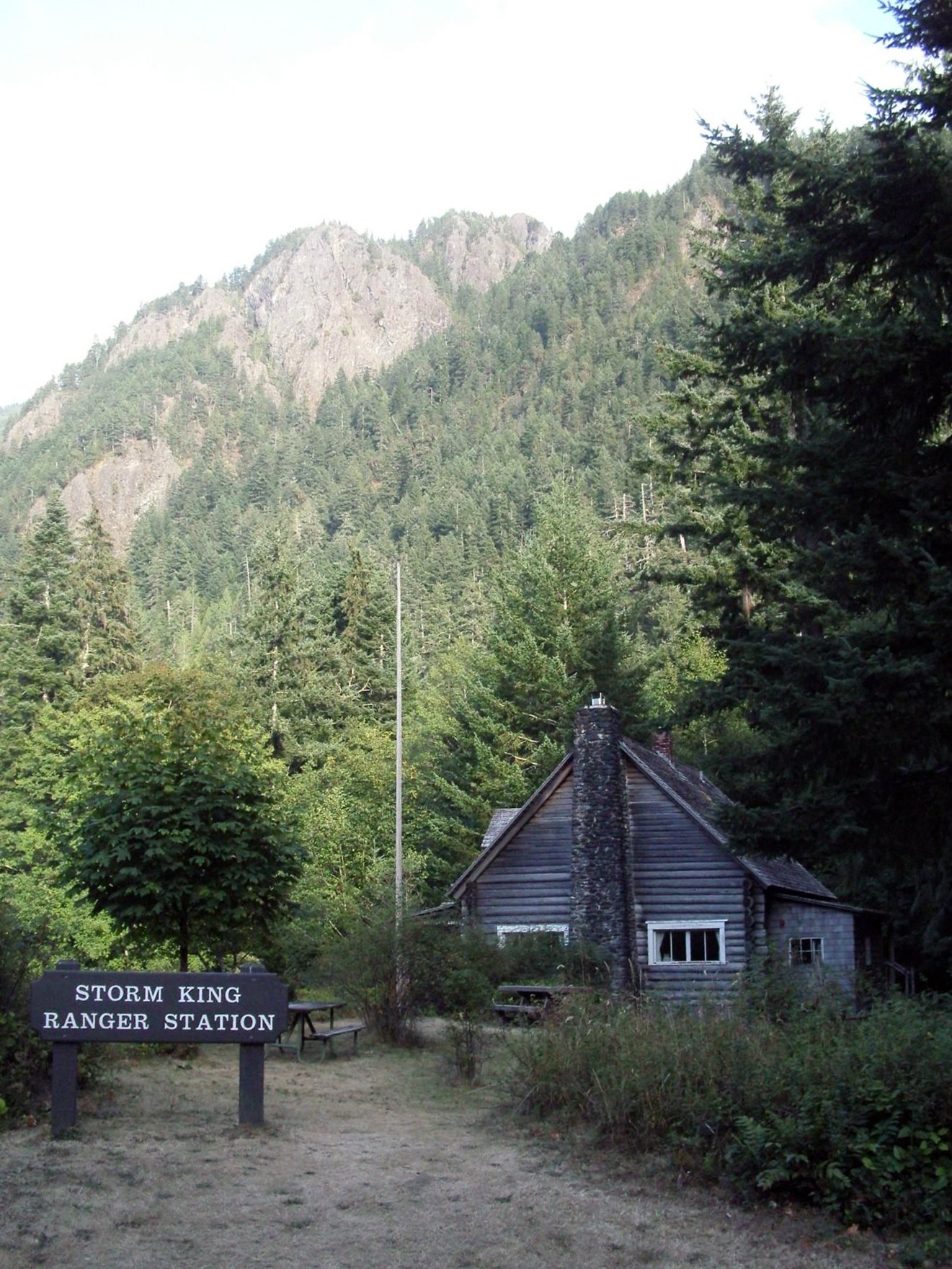
Storm King Ranger Station in 2010
