= Gettysburg, Washington =

- Ghost town
- Location within Washington (state) Location within the United States
- Coordinates: 48°09′25″N 123°49′35″W
- Country: United States
- State: Washington
- County: Clallam
- Established: 1890
- Time zone: UTC-8 (Pacific (PST))
  - Summer (DST): UTC-7 (PDT)

Gettysburg was a town near the mouth of the Lyre River at the Strait of Juan de Fuca in Clallam County, in the U.S. state of Washington.

The community was named after Robert N. Getty, a businessman in the lumber industry. The 30-year-old Getty settled in the area in 1887 and built several structures that served a local logging boom. A post office called Gettysburgh was established in 1890, and remained in operation until 1926. In 1912, Gettysburg postmaster, Ida M. Simmons, was convicted of embezzling $814 from the US government and she served a "unique" sentence of one hour in prison. Gettysburg had a steamboat connection to Puget Sound cities.

By 1976 it was reported that nothing remained of the town of Gettysburg except its name.

== See also ==
- List of ghost towns in Washington
