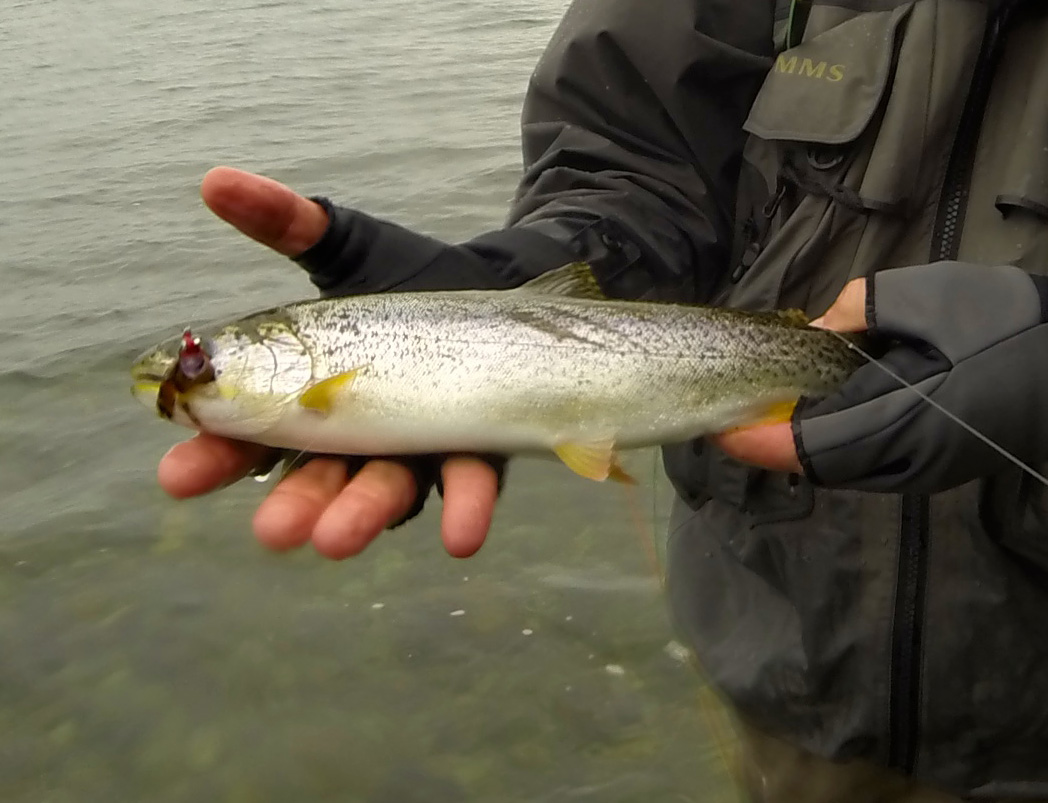

Conservation status
- Apparently Secure (NatureServe)

Scientific classification
- Kingdom: Animalia
- Phylum: Chordata
- Class: Actinopterygii
- Division: Teleostei
- Order: Salmoniformes
- Family: Salmonidae
- Genus: Oncorhynchus
- Species: O. clarkii
- Subspecies: O. c. clarkii

Trinomial name
- Oncorhynchus clarkii clarkii (Richardson, 1836)
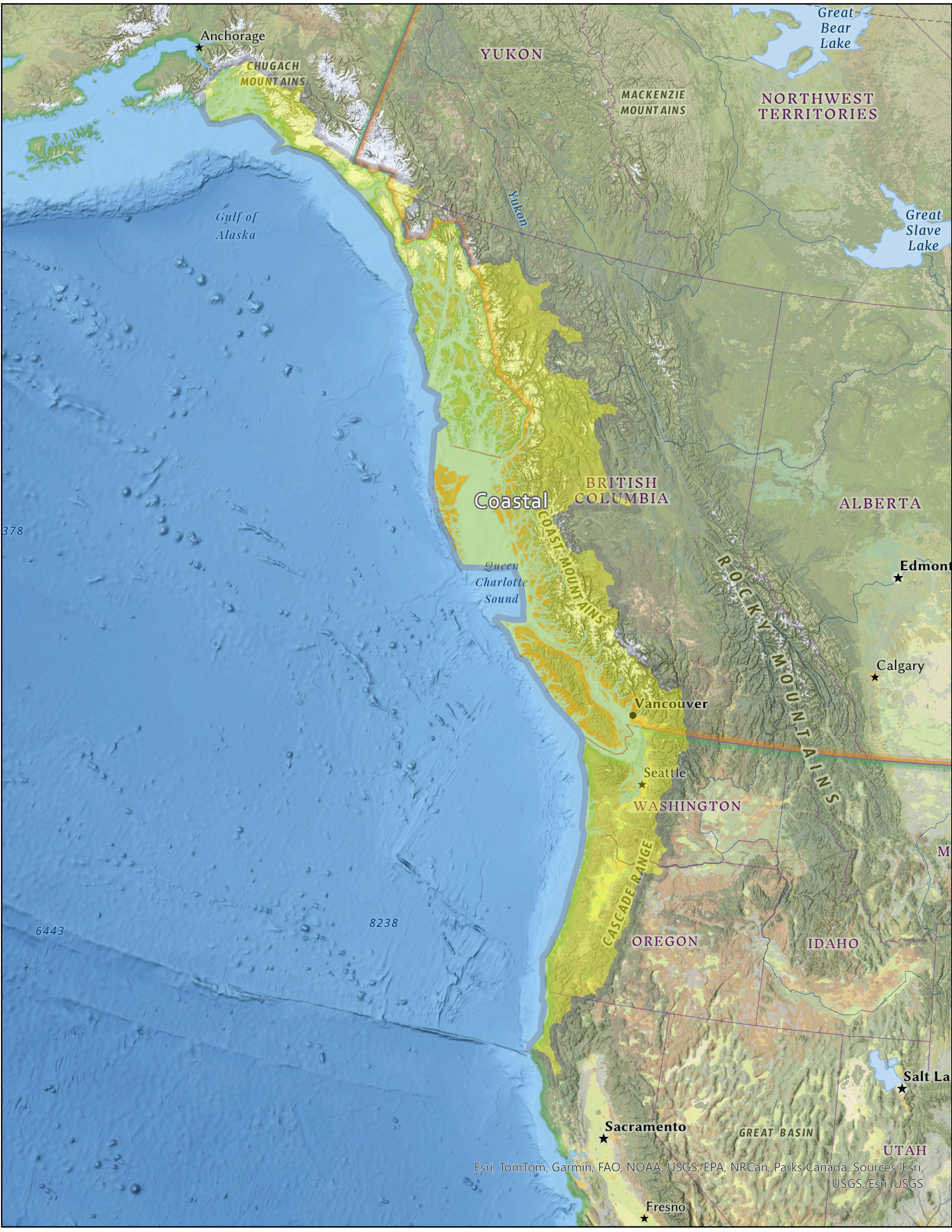
- Range of the Coastal cutthroat trout

= Coastal cutthroat trout =

Subspecies of fish

The coastal cutthroat trout (Oncorhynchus clarkii, sometimes referred as Oncorhynchus clarkii clarkii), also known as the sea-run cutthroat trout, blue-back trout or harvest trout, is one of the four species of cutthroat trout found in western North America. The coastal cutthroat trout occurs in four distinct forms. A semi-anadromous or sea-run form is the most well known. Freshwater forms occur in both large and small rivers and streams and lake environments. The native range of the coastal cutthroat trout extends south from the southern coastline of the Kenai Peninsula in Alaska to the Eel River in Northern California. Coastal cutthroat trout are resident in tributary streams and rivers of the Pacific basin and are rarely found more than 100 miles (160 km) from the ocean.

Adults migrate from the ocean to spawn in fresh water. Juveniles migrate to the sea where they feed and become sexually mature before returning to fresh water to overwinter and spawn. Unlike steelhead and Pacific salmon, coastal cutthroat do not make lengthy migrations out to sea. Generally speaking, coastal cutthroat will remain in or near estuarine waters, usually within 5–10 miles (8.0–16.1 km) of their natal stream. Some cutthroat, however, have been shown to move as far as 70 miles (110 km) into the open ocean. There are also lacustrine and riverine populations that spend their entire lives in freshwater. One such population is the trout of Lake Crescent in Washington state that was formerly considered to be a separate subspecies called the Lake Crescent cutthroat trout, Oncorhynchus clarkii crescenti.

== Taxonomy ==
Cutthroat trout were given the name Salmo clarkii in honor of William Clark, who co-led the expedition of 1804–1806. One of Lewis and Clark's missions was to describe the flora and fauna encountered during the expedition. The type specimen of S. clarki was described by naturalist John Richardson from a tributary of the lower Columbia River, identified as the "Katpootl", which was perhaps the Lewis River as there was a Multnomah village of similar name at the confluence. This type specimen was most likely the coastal cutthroat subspecies. In 1989, morphological and genetic studies by Gerald R. Smith, the Curator of Fishes at the Museum of Zoology, and Ralph F. Stearley, a doctoral candidate at Museum of Paleontology (University of Michigan) indicated trout of the Pacific basin were genetically closer to Pacific salmon (Oncorhynchus species) than to the Salmos–brown trout (S. trutta) or Atlantic salmon (S. salar) of the Atlantic basin. Thus, in 1989, taxonomic authorities moved the rainbow, cutthroat and other Pacific basin trout into the genus Oncorhynchus. Since diversion with the ancestor of the various cutthroat species 2.66 million years ago, the modern Coastal cutthroat trout has remained relatively unchanged. Formerly, Coastal cutthroat trout were lumped together as one species with multiple subspecies, but newer evidence supports a framework of four full species (with multiple subspecies), including the Coastal cutthroat trout.

== Description ==
Freshwater forms of the coastal cutthroat trout are generally dark green to greenish-blue on back, olive-green on upper flank, silvery on lower flank and belly. They display more numerous flank spots below lateral line, irregular spots on dorsal, adipose and caudal fins and the anal, pectoral and pelvic fin bases. The gill covers are pinkish. Sea-run forms while in salt water and shortly after returning to fresh water are silvery with a bluish back, yellowish lower flanks and fins, and display sparse spots. Cutthroats usually display distinctive red, pink, or orange linear marks along the undersides of their mandibles in the lower folds of the gill plates. These markings are responsible for the common name "cutthroat" given to the trout by outdoor writer Charles Hallock in an 1884 article in The American Angler., although the red slashes are not unique to the cutthroat trout and some coastal rainbow trout and redband trout also display throat slashes. The sea-run forms of coastal cutthroat average 2 to 5 lb (0.9 to 2.3 kg), while stream-resident forms attain much smaller sizes 0.4 to 3.2 oz (11 to 91 g).

=== Lifecycle ===
Coastal cutthroat trout usually inhabit and spawn in small to moderately large, clear, well-oxygenated, shallow rivers with gravel bottoms. They are native to the alluvial or freestone streams that are typical tributaries of the Pacific Basin. They typically spawn from December through June, with peak spawning in February. Eggs begin to hatch within six to seven weeks of spawning. Spawning begins when water temperatures reach 43 to 46 °F (6 to 8 °C). Depending on temperature, alevins emerge as fry between March and June, with peak emergence in mid-April. Lake-resident coastal cutthroat trout are usually found in moderately deep, cool lakes with adequate shallows and vegetation for good food production. Lake populations generally require access to gravel-bottomed streams to be self-sustaining, but occasionally spawn on shallow gravel beds with good water circulation.

Cutthroat trout naturally interbreed with the closely related rainbow trout, producing fertile hybrids commonly called "cutbows" although this is a much rarer occurrence with the coastal cutthroat trout because of reproductive isolation as the coastal cutthroat trout is the only cutthroat subspecies to coevolve through its entire range with the coastal rainbow trout (O. mykiss irideus). As this hybrid generally bears similar coloration and overall appearance to the cutthroat, retaining the characteristic orange-red slash, these hybrids often pose a taxonomic difficulty.

== Range and habitat ==
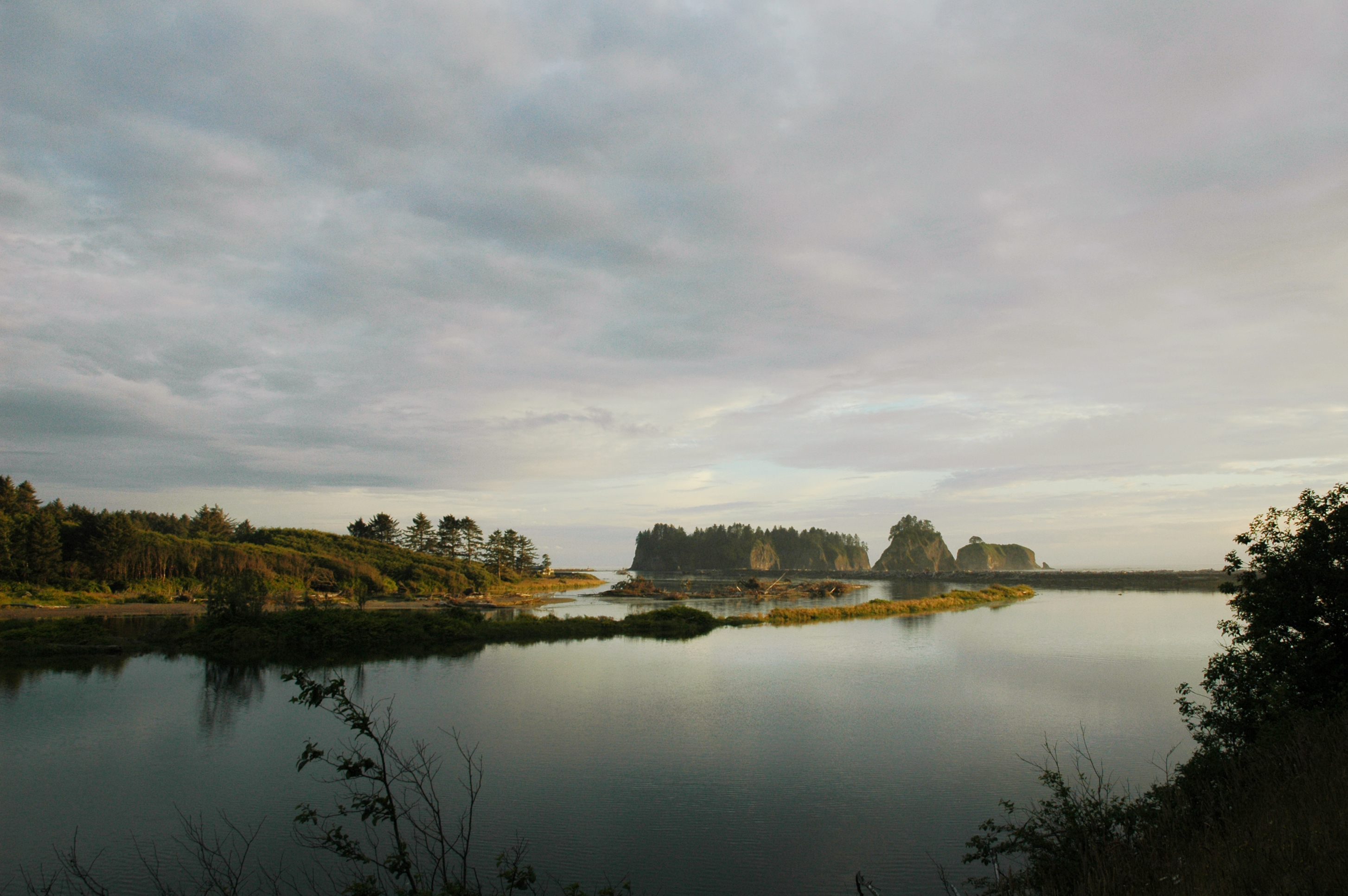
Typical northwest saltwater estuary environment for cutthroat trout, Quillayute River, Washington

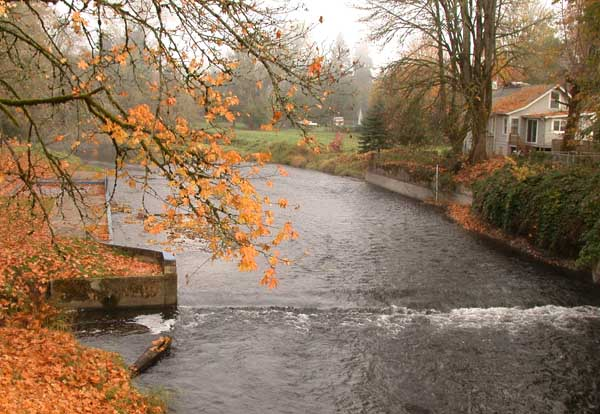
The Nehalem River at Vernonia, Oregon

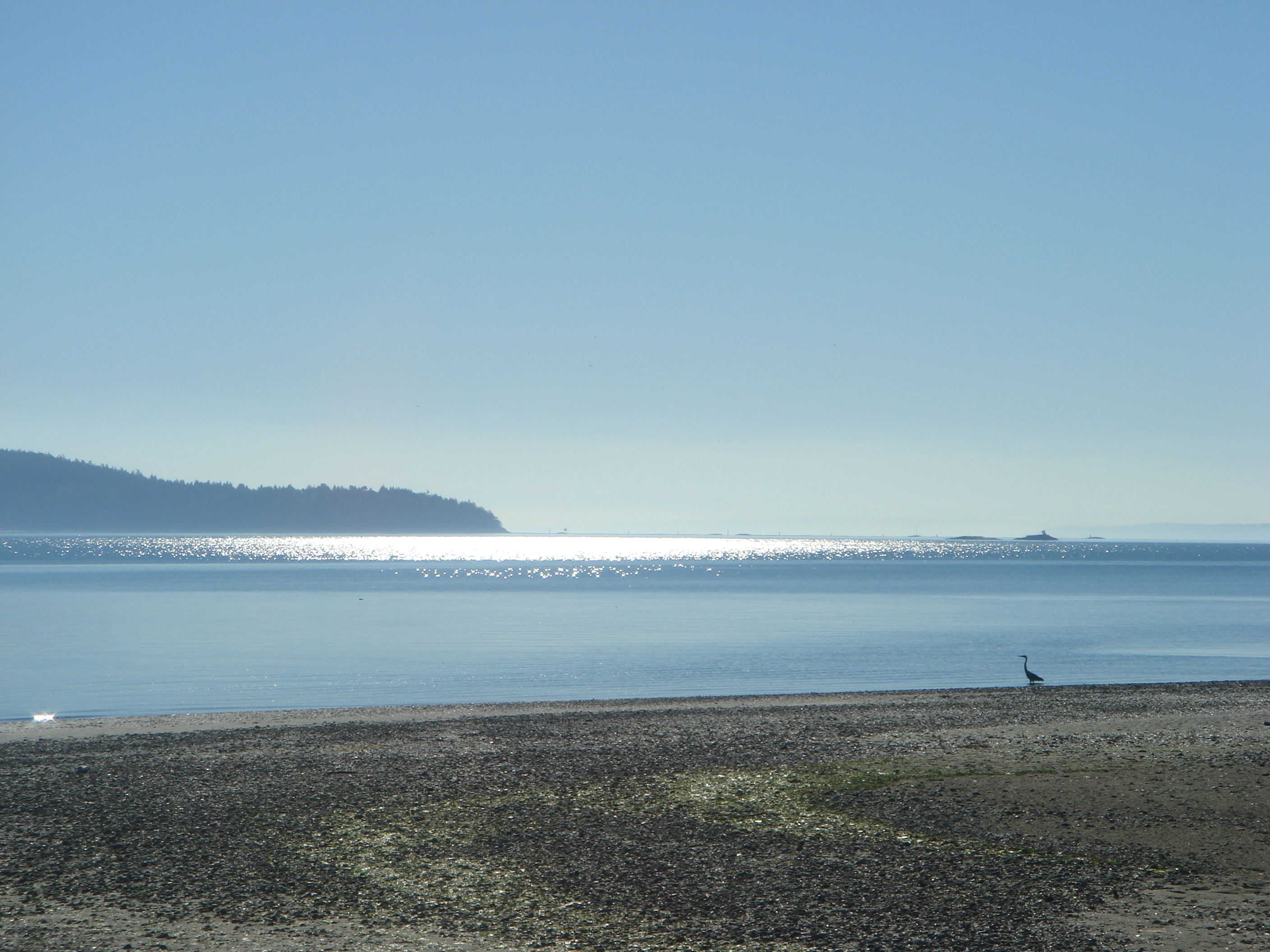
Typical sea-run cutthroat habitat, Puget Sound beach

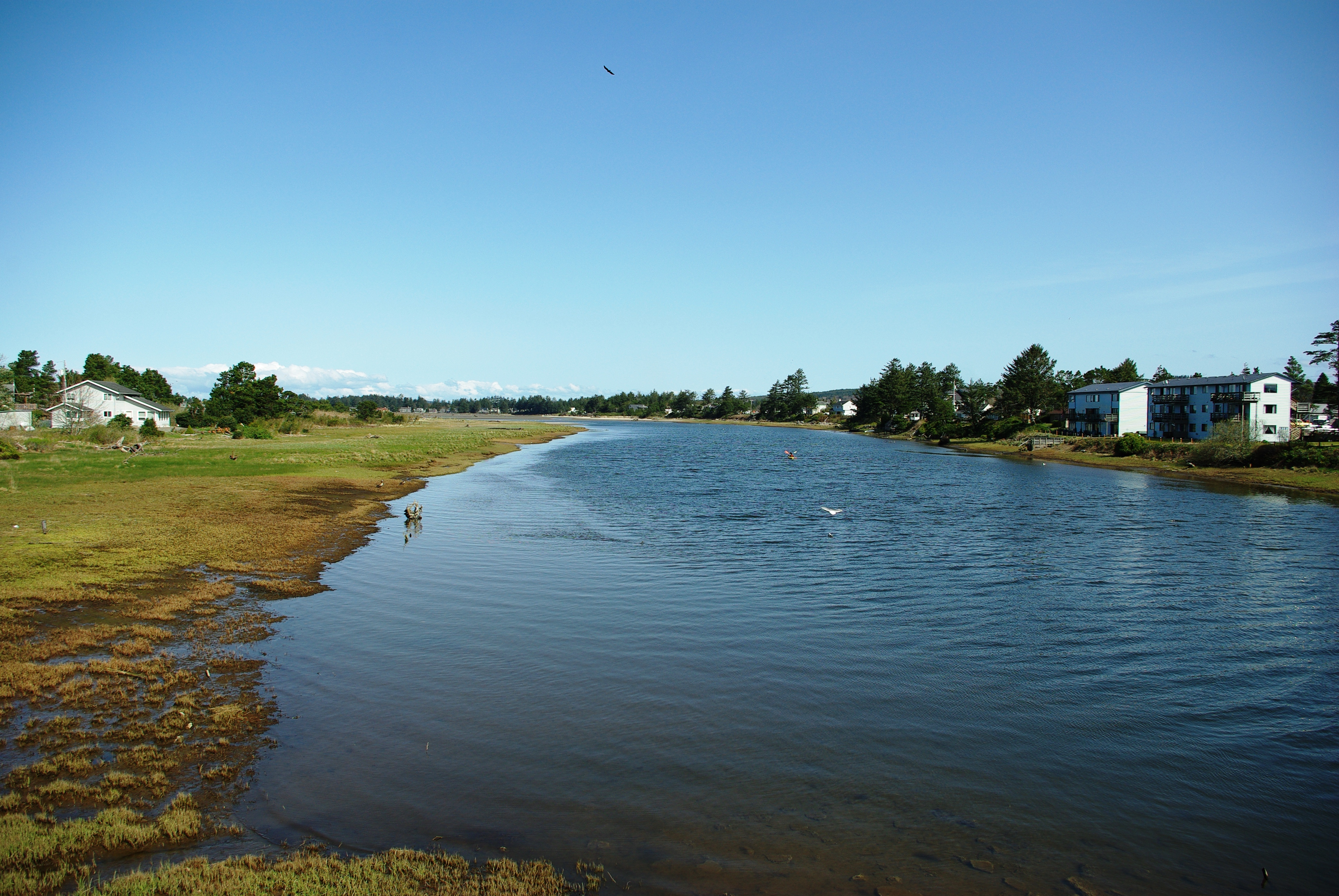
The Necanicum River, a coastal waterway, typical sea-run cutthroat habitat

The native range of the coastal cutthroat trout extends south from the southern coastline of the Kenai Peninsula in Alaska to the Eel River in Northern California. Coastal cutthroat trout are resident in tributary streams and rivers of the Pacific basin and are rarely found more than 100 miles (160 km) from the ocean. Semi-anadromous, stream resident, fluvial and lake resident forms exist. The great majority of coastal cutthroat trout habitat coincides with the belt of Pacific coast coniferous rainforest that extends from Alaska southward into Northern California.

Coastal cutthroat trout use a large variety of habitat types, including lower and upper reaches of both large and small river systems, urban environments, estuaries, sloughs, ponds, lakes, and near shore ocean waters. They spend more time in fresh water environments than other anadromous Pacific salmonids. In fresh water they prefer deeper pool habitat and cover, such as that formed by woody debris. The semi-anadromous forms of coastal cutthroat trout do not overwinter in saltwater and rarely make extended migrations across large bodies of water. Migrations in the marine environment are usually within 6 miles (9.7 km) of land. Semi-anadromous coastal cutthroat typically spend two to five years rearing in fresh water before making their initial migration into saltwater. Generally, semi-anadromous coastal cutthroat trout spend short periods offshore during summer months and return to estuaries and fresh water by fall or winter.

== Conservation status ==
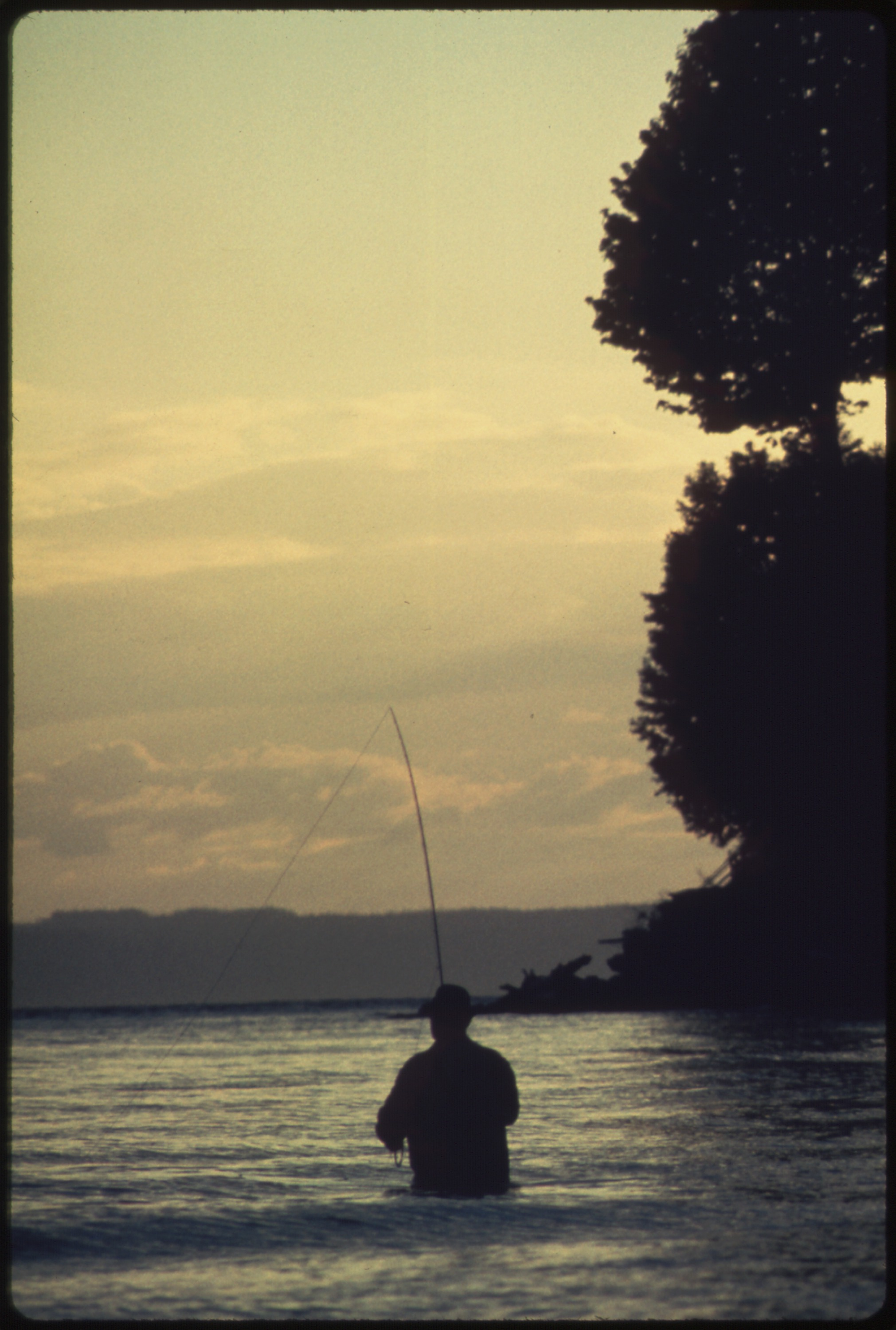
Angling for cutthroat trout in Puget Sound

The coastal cutthroat is a secure subspecies of the cutthroat trout. Although there has been a general population decline of the sea-run form throughout its native range since the 19th century, none of the populations in the United States or British Columbia are considered threatened or endangered. The U.S. Fish and Wildlife Service, in cooperation with the U.S. Environmental Protection Agency, National Marine Fisheries Service and state wildlife agencies has designated ten distinct population segments (DPS) from Alaska to California. A comprehensive status review of the DPSs in 1999 determined that only one DPS, the Southwestern Washington/Columbia River DPS be proposed for threatened status under the Endangered Species Act. On July 5, 2002, after lengthy public comment and scientific evaluation, the U.S. Fish and Wildlife service withdrew its proposal to list the Southwestern Washington/Columbia River DPS as threatened.

Stream resident, fluvial and lake forms are secure within their native range and supplemented by stocking of hatchery raised fish in Washington and Oregon.
