= Aurora Peak (Washington) =

Mountain in Washington (state), United States

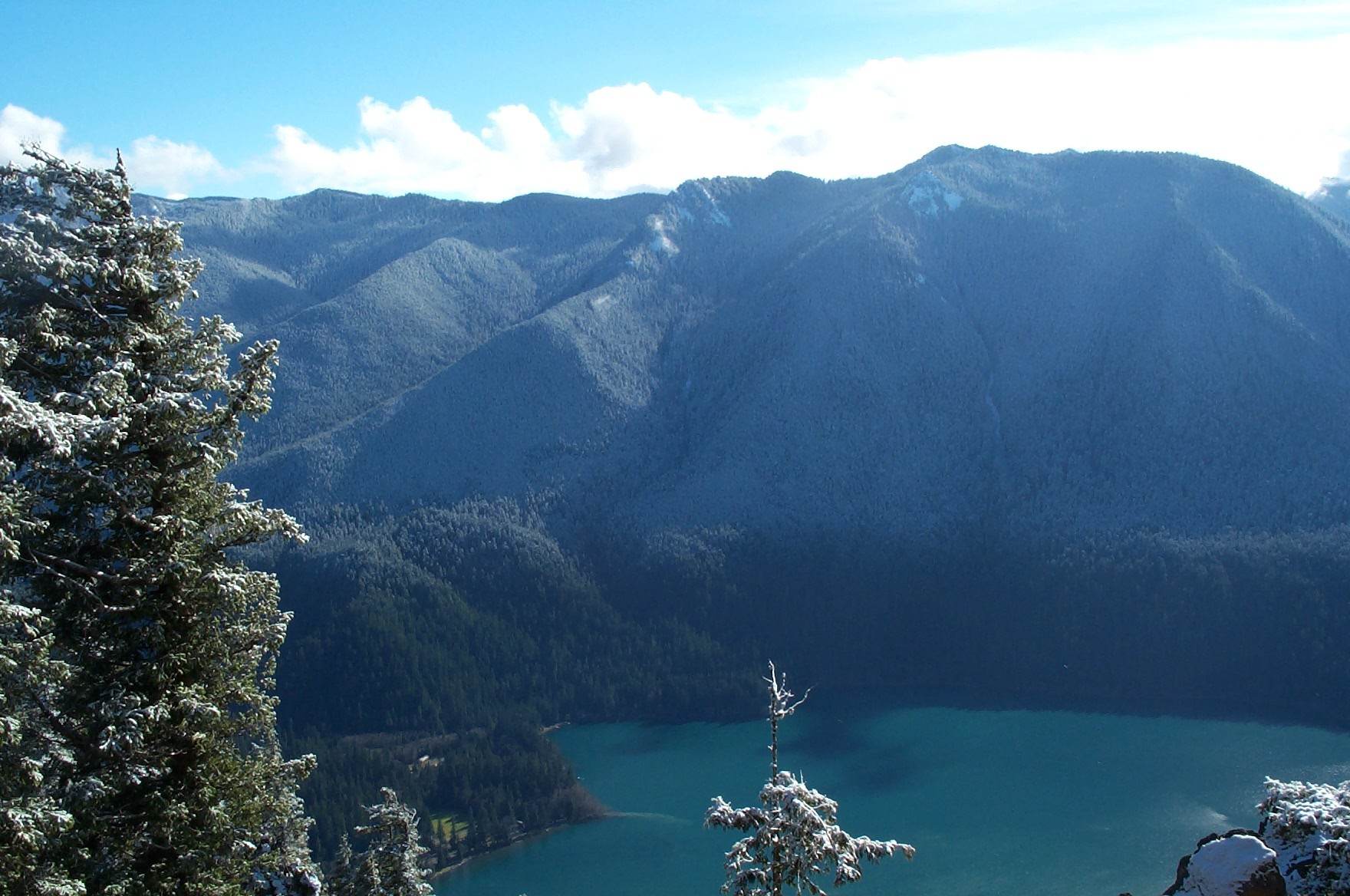
- Happy Lake Ridge and Aurora Peak as seen from Pyramid Peak in February

Highest point
- Elevation: 4754+ ft (1449+ m) NAVD 88
- Prominence: 450 ft (137 m)
- Coordinates: 48°01′24″N 123°48′46″W

Geography
- Location within Washington (state)
- Location: Olympic National Park; Clallam County, Washington, U.S.
- Parent range: Olympic Mountains
- Topo map: USGS Lake Crescent

Aurora Peak is a summit in Olympic National Park in Clallam County, Washington. It is the highest point on Aurora Ridge. The northern flank of the ridge forms a steep escarpment above Lake Crescent, while the southern flank towers above the Sol Duc River. Other summits on the ridge are Sourdough Mountain and Lizard Head Peak. To the east the ridge is known as Happy Lake Ridge.

The Aurora Ridge Trail follows along the ridge line providing scenic views. The 15.1 miles (24.3 km) trail, rated moderate to difficult, changes in elevation from 1,300 to 4,800 feet (400 to 1,460 m). The Park Service notes that "some sections of this trail are difficult to follow.".
