= Fairholm, Washington =

Unincorporated community in Washington, United States

- Campground
- Location within Washington (state)
- Coordinates: 48°04′05″N 123°54′54″W
- Country: United States
- State: Washington
- County: Clallam
- Time zone: UTC-8 (Pacific (PST))
  - Summer (DST): UTC-7 (PDT)

Fairholm (also spelled Fairholme) is a campground in Clallam County, Washington, United States. The community is located at the west end of Lake Crescent in the Olympic National Park. Fairholm also features a general store, cafe, and other park-related buildings.

Fairholm was settled just prior to 1891 by W.V. Wilson and was named by Caroline Jones. A post office, named "Fairholme", was there from 1891 to 1902; George Mitchell was its first postmaster. Boat service on Lake Crescent connected Fairholm to Piedmont on the northeastern shore.

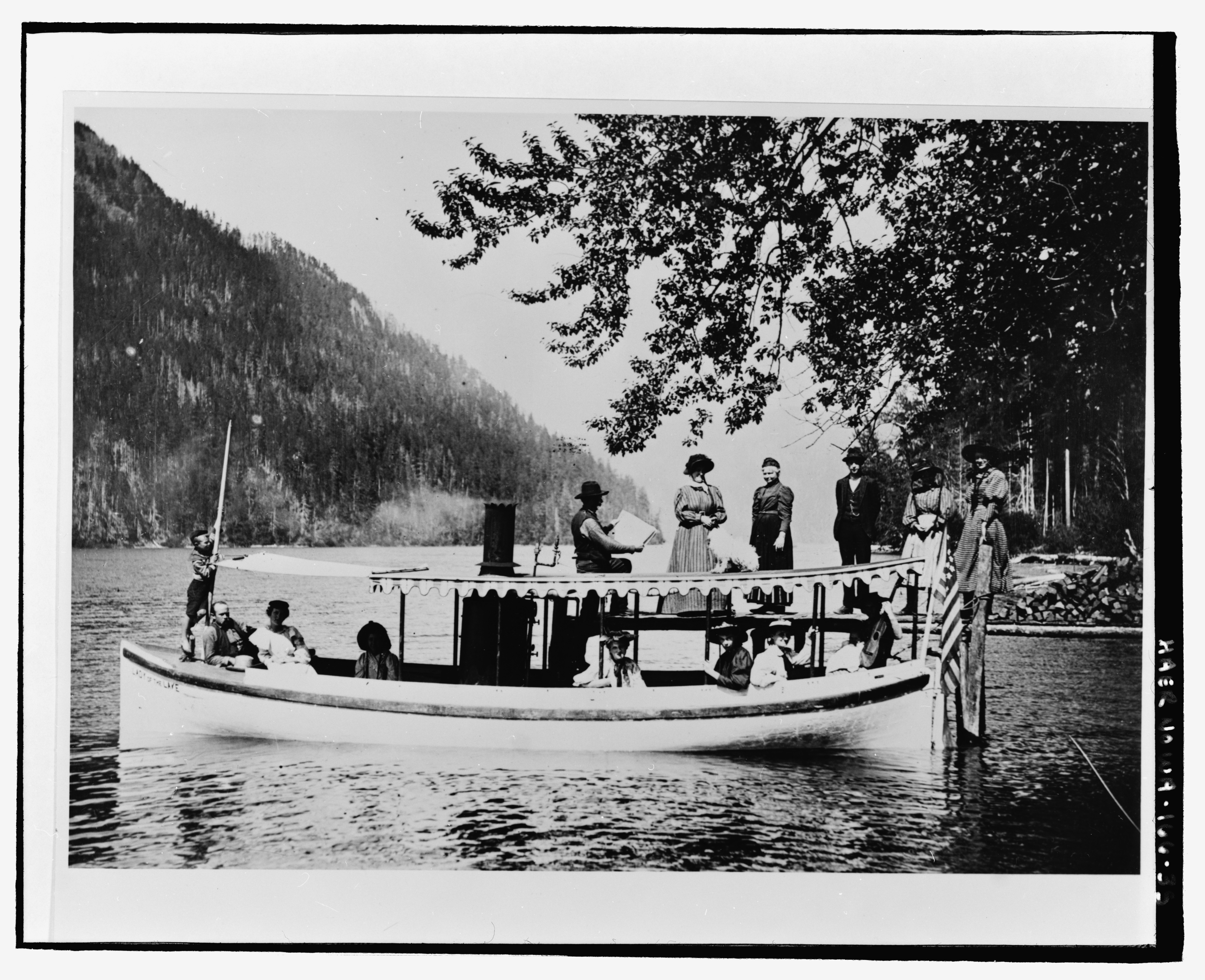
Lady of the Lake traversed Lake Crescent between Fairholm and Piedmont

== See also ==
- Ferries and steamboats of Lake Crescent, Washington
