= Marymere Falls =

Waterfall in Washington (state), United States

Coordinates: 48°2′58″N 123°47′19″W

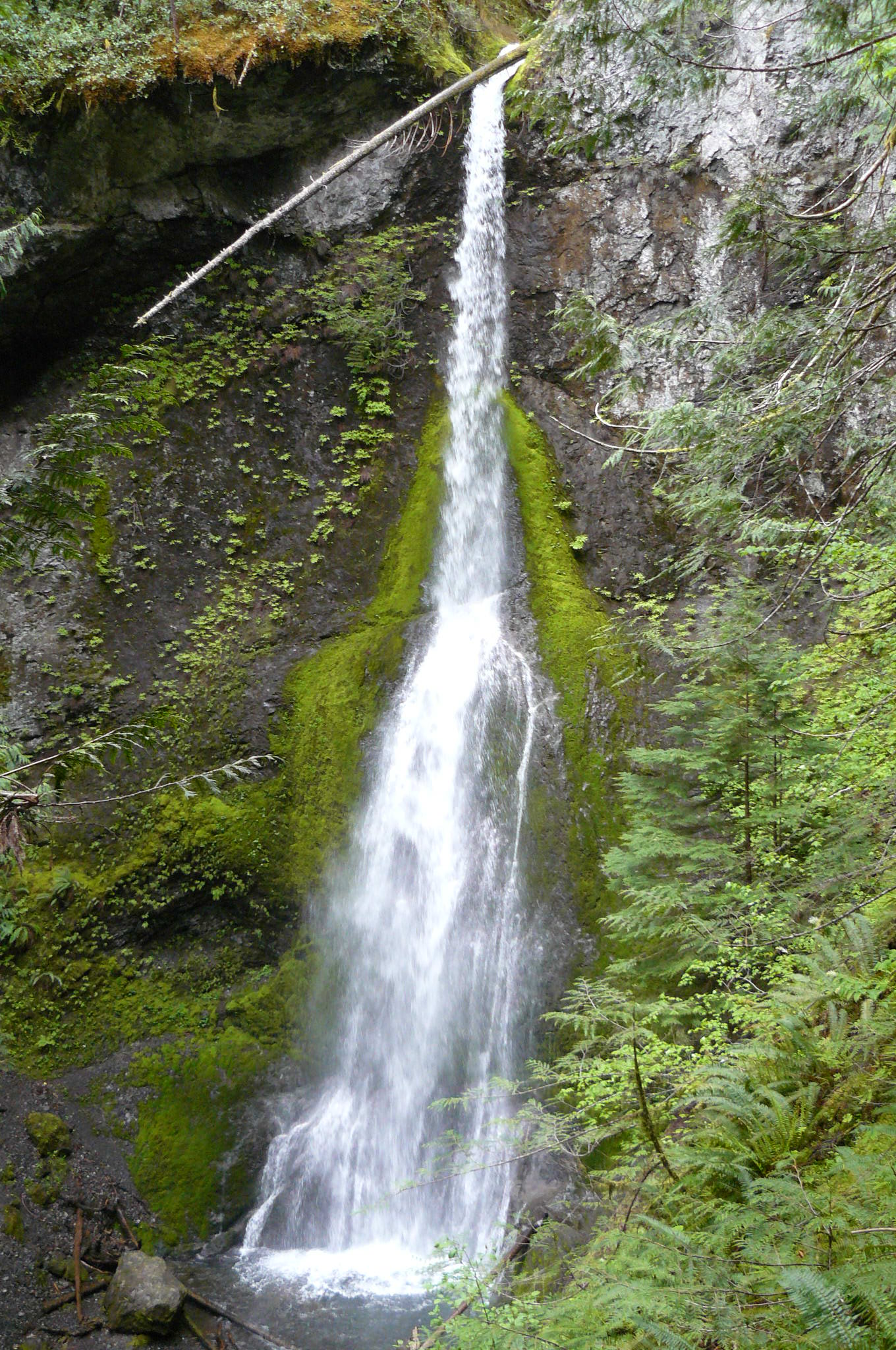
- Interactive map of Marymere Falls
- Location: Olympic National Park, Clallam County, Washington, U.S.
- Total height: 90.5 ft (27.6 m)

Marymere Falls is located in Olympic National Park near Lake Crescent in Washington, United States. The falls are accessed by a 0.9 mile, well-maintained, dirt trail through an old-growth lowland forest consisting of fir, cedar, hemlock, alder trees and 2 wooden bridges. Falls creek descends from Aurora Ridge and tumbles over Marymere Falls and then flows into Barnes Creek. It has a height of 90.5 feet (27.6 m). The falls is one of the more popular attractions in the area, due to ease of access and proximity to U.S. Highway 101.
