= Piedmont, Washington =

Unincorporated community in Washington, United States

- Unincorporated community
- Location within Washington (state) Location within the United States
- Coordinates: 48°05′37″N 123°47′30″W
- Country: United States
- State: Washington
- County: Clallam
- Settled: approx. 1883
- Elevation: 607 ft (185 m)
- Time zone: UTC-8 (Pacific (PST))
  - Summer (DST): UTC-7 (PDT)
- GNIS feature ID: 1524409

Piedmont is a small unincorporated community in Clallam County, Washington, United States. It is located on Lake Crescent in the northwestern corner of the Olympic National Park.

Settler John Smith arrived at the Piedmont area around 1883. William Dawson named Piedmont in 1893 for its location at the foot of a mountain.
