= Lake Crescent =

Lake located in Olympic National Park, Washington, United States

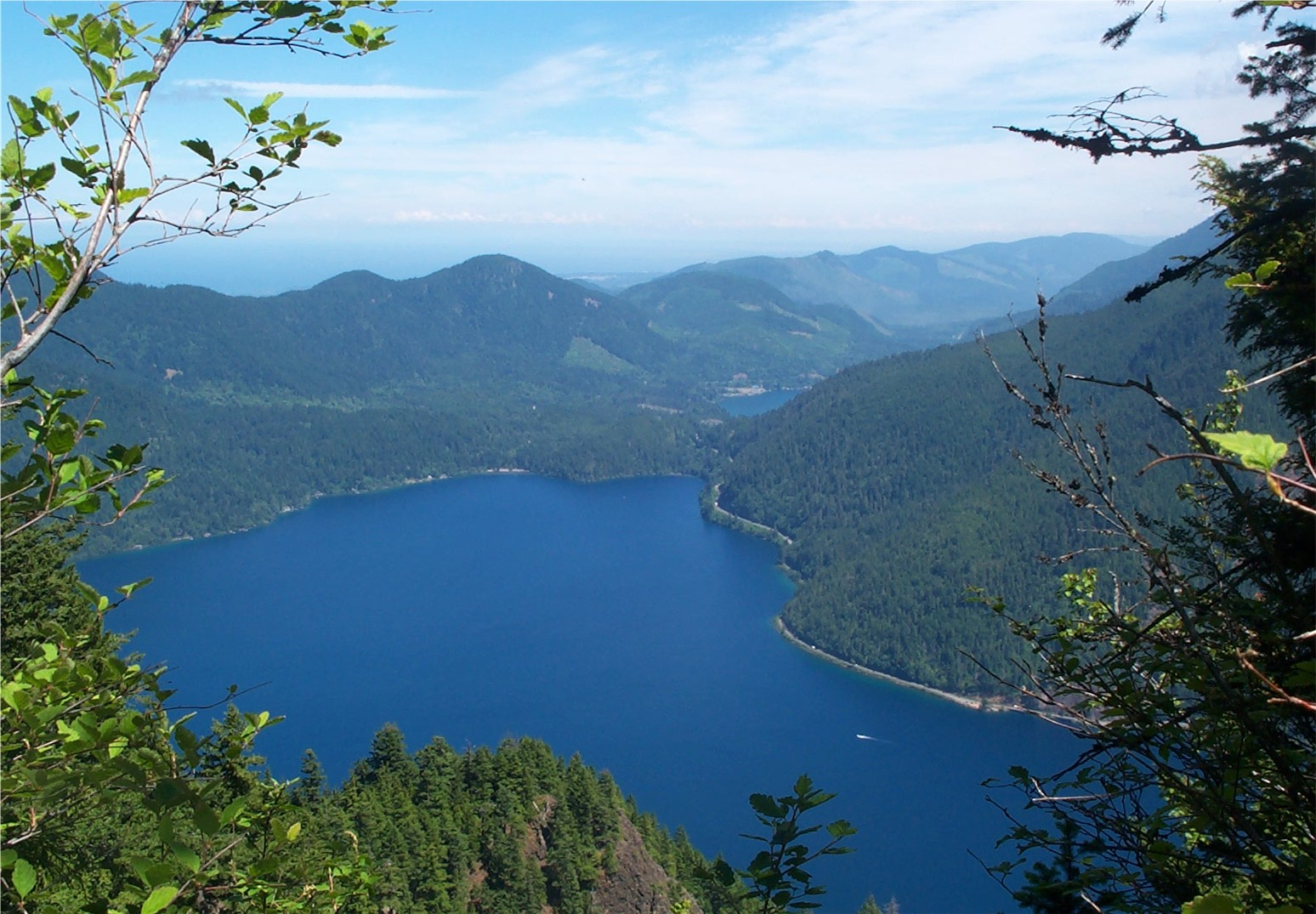
- View of the ancient landslide that dammed Lake Crescent

- Location within Washington (state) Location within the United States
- Location: Clallam County, Washington
- Coordinates: 48.06°N 123.83°W
- Type: Crescent
- Primary inflows: Barnes Creek, Smith Creek, Aurora Creek, Eagle Creek
- Primary outflows: Lyre River
- Basin countries: United States
- Max. length: 12 m (39 ft)
- Surface area: 5,127-acre (21 km^{2})
- Average depth: 300 ft (91 m)
- Max. depth: 624 ft (190 m)
- Surface elevation: 580 ft (180 m)
- Settlements: Piedmont

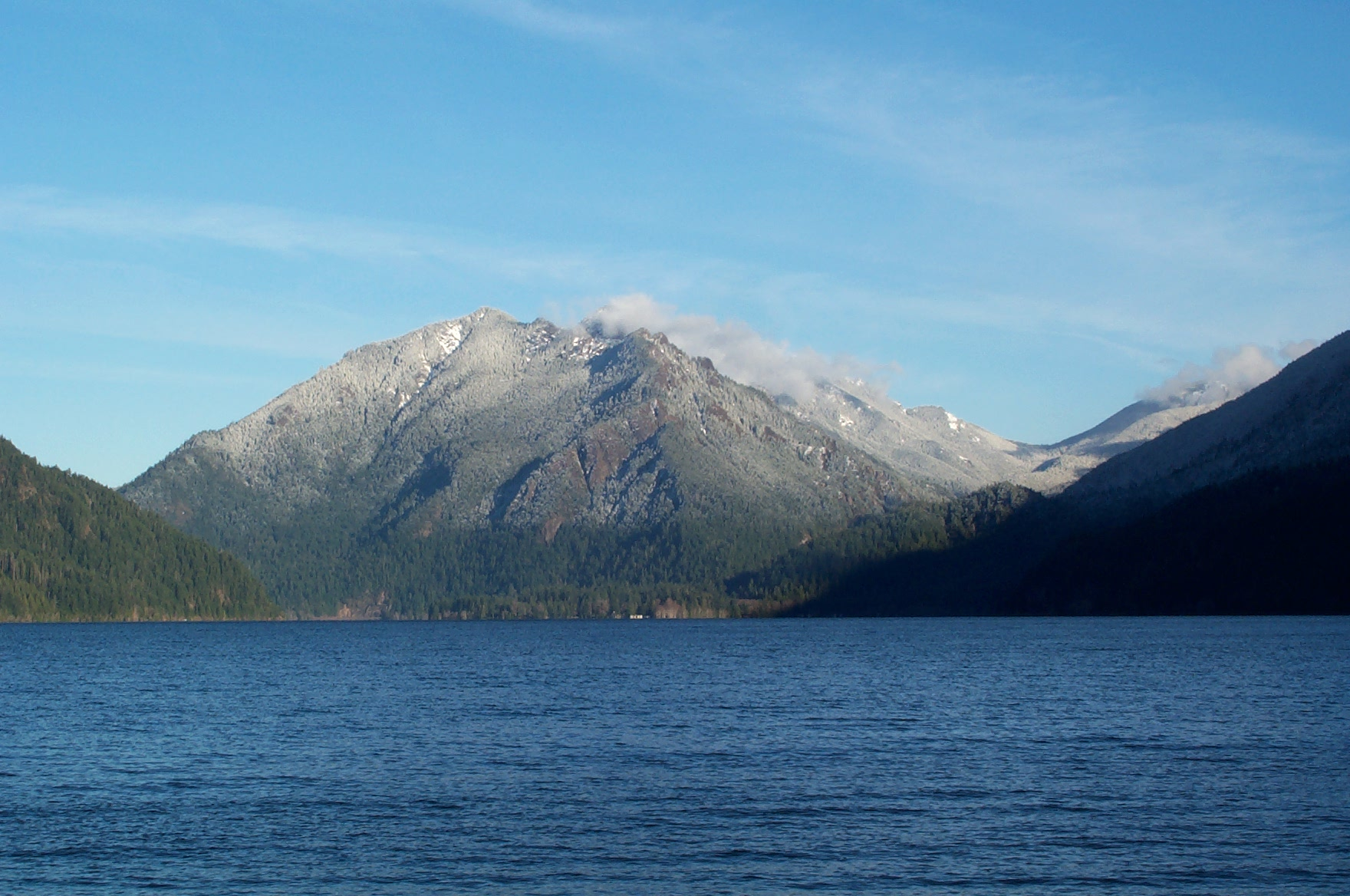
Lake Crescent and Mount Storm King in February

Lake Crescent is a deep lake located entirely within Olympic National Park in Clallam County, Washington, United States, approximately 17 miles (27 km) west of Port Angeles on U.S. Route 101, near the small community of Piedmont. With an official maximum depth of 624 feet (190 m), it is the second deepest lake in the state of Washington (after Lake Chelan). A lake-wide bathymetric survey was performed from 2013 to 2014 by Eian Ray and Jeff Engea and the results of this survey show the maximum depth as being 596 feet (182 m). Using GIS statistical analysis, this survey also estimated that the lake contains around 0.5 cubic miles (2.1 km^{3}) of fresh water.

Lake Crescent is known for brilliant blue waters and exceptional clarity caused by low levels of nitrogen in the water that inhibit the growth of algae. The lake is located in a popular recreational area and features several trails, including the Spruce Railroad Trail, Pyramid Mountain trail, and the Barnes Creek trail to Marymere Falls. The Spruce Railroad Trail follows the grade of what was once the tracks of a logging railroad along the shores of the lake. By following this trail on the north side of the lake one can find the entrance to an old railroad tunnel that is now part of the Spruce Railroad Trail, providing access to "Devils Punch Bowl", a popular swimming and diving area.

== Origins ==
The lake was formed when glaciers carved deep valleys during the last Ice Age. Initially, the Lake Crescent valley drained into the Indian Creek valley and then into Elwha River. Anadromous fish such as steelhead and coastal cutthroat trout migrated into the valley from lower waters.

Approximately 8,000 years ago, a great landslide from one of the Olympic Mountains dammed Indian Creek, and the deep valley filled with water. Many geologists believe that Lake Crescent and nearby Lake Sutherland formed at the same time, but became separated by the landslide. This theory is supported by Klallam tribe legend which tells a story of Mount Storm King being angered by warring tribes and throwing a boulder to cut Lake Sutherland in two, resulting in Lake Crescent. The results of the landslide are easily visible from the summit of Pyramid Mountain. Eventually, the water found an alternative route out of the valley, spilling into the Lyre River, passing over the Lyre River Falls and then out the Strait of Juan de Fuca.

== Ecology ==
The anadromous fish populations in the lake became landlocked, because those fish could not ascend Lyre River Falls, making a barrier in that direction. Over time, two different subspecies of fish evolved in the lake: the endemic Beardslee trout, a relative of rainbow trout, spawns in the Lyre River above the falls, while the Crescenti cutthroat trout spawns in Barnes Creek.

== Depth ==
In the early 1960s the U.S. Navy surveyed the lake using a Furuno depth sounder. They were unable to determine the maximum depth with their equipment. During a 1970 depth survey conducted by the students of the fisheries program at Peninsula College in Port Angeles, Washington, students used instruments that could not record measurements beyond a depth of 624 feet (190 m). This became known as the "official" depth of the lake as recorded by the National Park Service. However, when power cable was being laid in the lake in the 1980s, instruments showed depths over 1,000 feet (300 m), the maximum range of the equipment used.

The Lake Crescent Bathymetric Survey: In 2013 and 2014, geographic data scientists Eian Ray and Jeff Enge performed a lake-wide bathymetric survey, taking over 5,000 depth soundings. GIS statistical analysis showed the lake contains approximately 0.5 cubic miles (2.1 km^{3}) of freshwater. The deepest spot was shown to be 596 feet (182 m) deep. Much of the shoreline of the lake drops off steeply, in many cases a sheer underwater cliff face. During the Lake Crescent Bathymetric Survey, it was speculated that the erroneous depth record of 1,000 feet (300 m) from the 1980s was a result of the sonar signal reflecting off the steep underwater slopes near the shore.

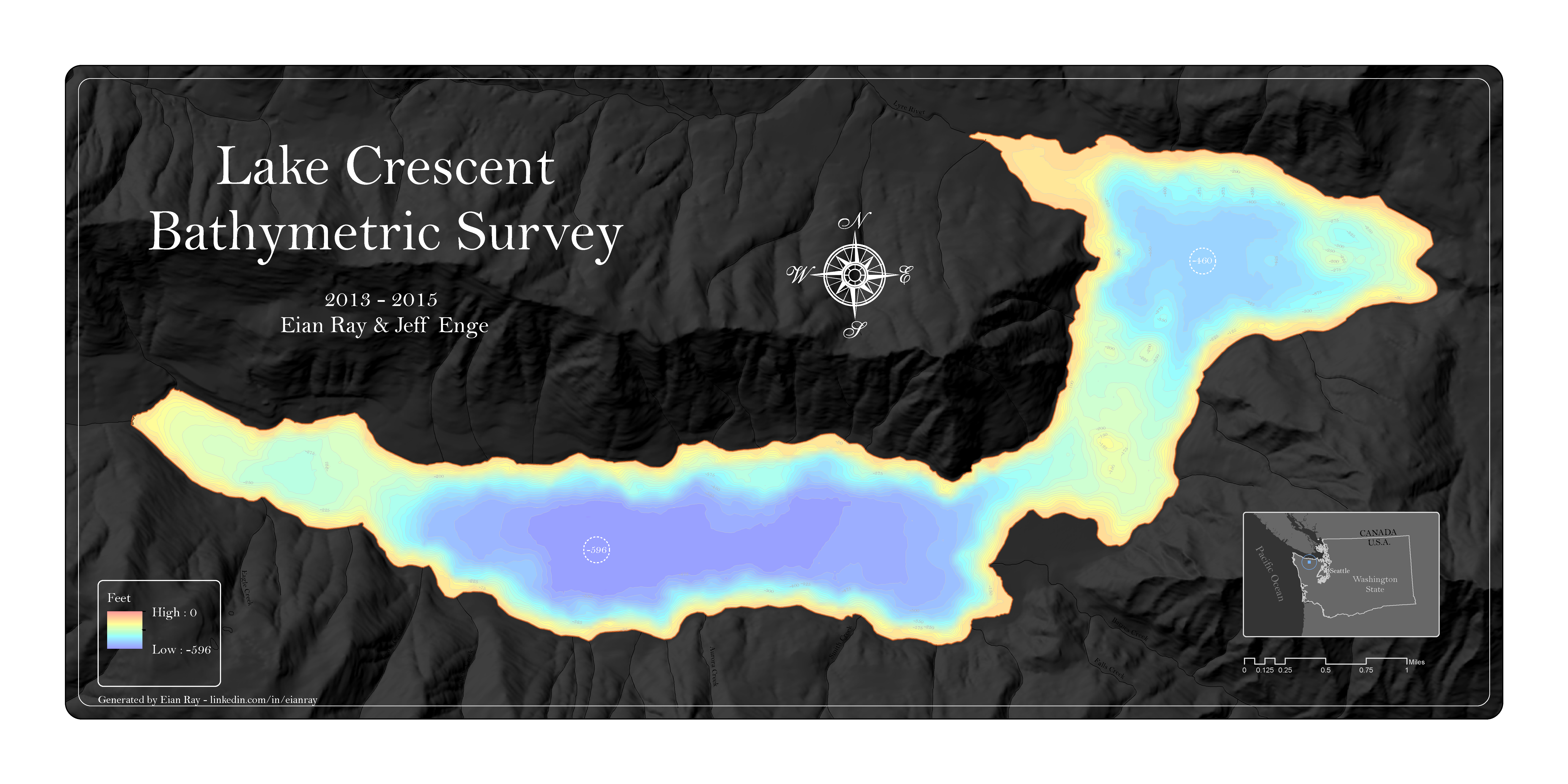
Lake Crescent bathymetric (water depth) map

== History ==
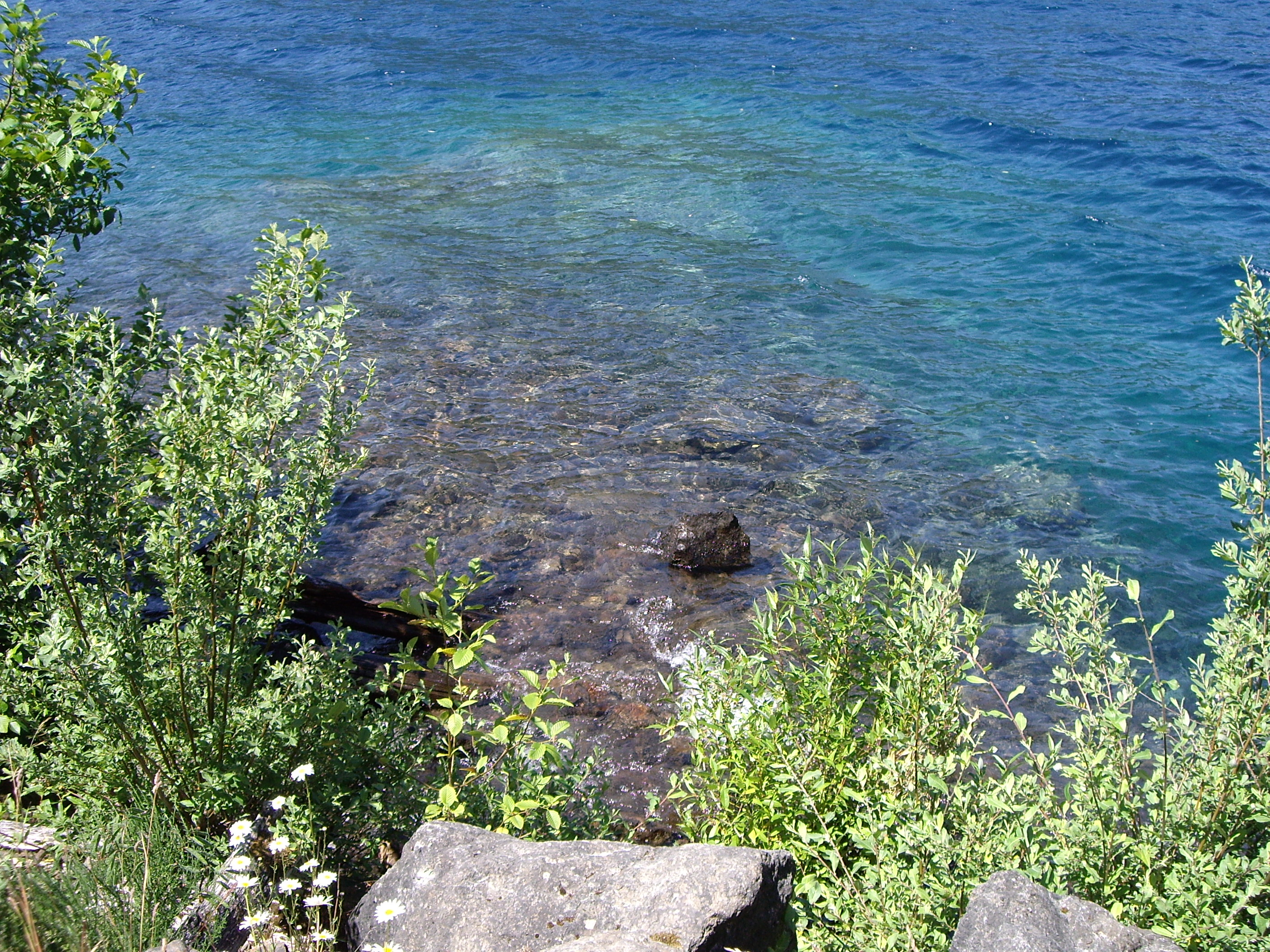
The lake's brilliantly colored water

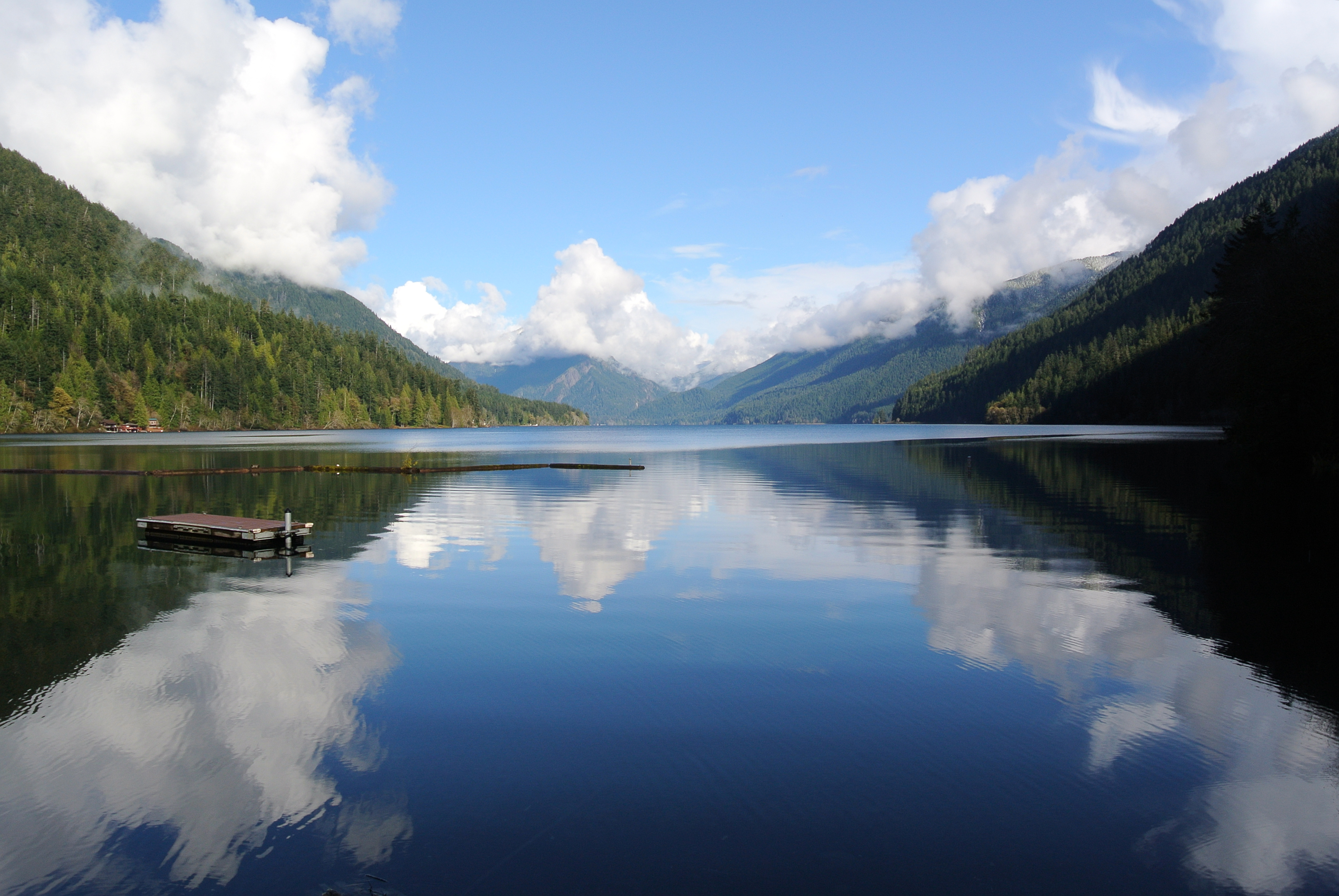
The lake in spring

Scientists have found evidence of four very large landslides entering Lake Crescent between about 5,200 BCE and about 1,100 BCE. In the c. 1,100 BCE event, an earthquake triggered the 7,200,000-cubic-metre (9,400,000 cu yd) Sledgehammer Point Rockslide, which fell from Mount Storm King and entered waters at least 140 metres (459 ft) deep, generating a megatsunami with an estimated maximum run-up height of 82 to 104 metres (269 to 341 ft).

It is not certain whether the lake was named for its crescent shape or for its proximity to Crescent Bay, which was named by Henry Kellett in 1846. In 1849 two British–Canadian fur trappers, John Sutherland and John Everett, forged inland from Crescent Bay. The two lakes they found became known as Lake Sutherland and Everett Lake. Later, Everett Lake was renamed Lake Crescent. It has also been known as Big Lake and Elk Lake.

In 1890, while the Port Crescent Improvement Company was promoting its townsite near the lake, M.J. Carrigan started the Port Crescent Leader to help boost the town. He wrote of the beautiful lake, which he called Lake Crescent, and the name soon became well-established.

The lake was included in the Olympic Forest Reserve in 1897, designated as a recreation area in 1921, and finally included in Olympic National Park in 1938.

== Notable incidents ==
In 1929, Russell and Blanch Warren disappeared while driving in the vicinity of Lake Crescent. Their whereabouts remained unknown until 2002 when their 1927 Chevrolet automobile was found over 160 feet (49 m) beneath the surface of Lake Crescent.

In 1937, a waitress named Hallie Illingworth went missing and was found three years later by local fishermen. She was apparently weighted down, and with time her restraints decayed, allowing her body to float to the surface. The corpse was well preserved by the near-freezing lake temperature. Her skin had turned into a substance described as "ivory soap", which was caused by minerals in the lake water interacting with body fat in a process called saponification. Her husband, Montgomery J. "Monty" Illingworth, was later convicted of her murder. He served nine years in prison and was paroled in 1951.

== See also ==
- Steamboats of Lake Crescent, Washington
- Barnes Point
- Kloshe Nanitch Lookout

== Sources ==
- Amundson, Mavis (June 5, 2008). "Lady of the Lake". HistoryLink: The Free Online Encyclopedia of Washington State History.
- Ollikainen, Rob (January 28, 2011). "Coping with a tragedy: Father tells of son's suicide in hopes of helping others". Peninsula Daily News.
- Parratt, Smitty (1984). Gods & goblins: A Field Guide to Place Names of Olympic National Park. CP Publications. ISBN 0-914195-00-X.
- Williams, Hill (2002). The Restless Northwest: A Geological Story. Washington State University Press. ISBN 0-87422-250-8.
- Lake Crescent Management Plan: Final Environmental Impact Statement. Olympic National Park, Washington: National Park Service. September 1998.
