= Sea of Okhotsk Coast =

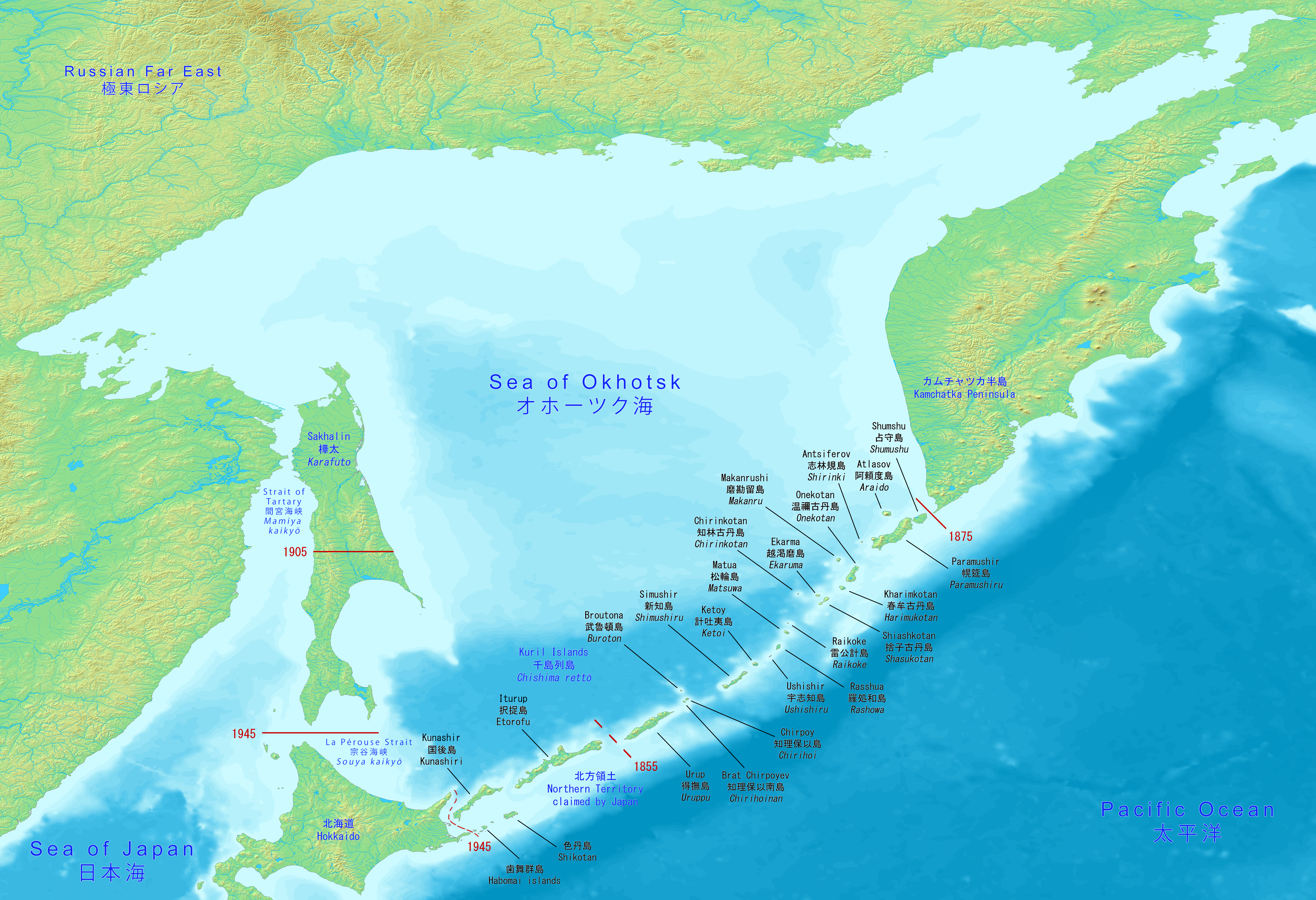
Sea of Okhotsk

The Sea of Okhotsk Coast (or Okhotsk Coast) is split into natural major parts according to the delineation of the Sea of Okhotsk: its northwestern part, which is part of the mainland of Eastern Siberia (Russian Far East), the west coast of the Kamchatka Peninsula (Russia), the coasts of the Kuril Islands (Russia; some are disputed by Japan), the northeastern coast of Hokkaido (Japan), the north and east coasts of Sakhalin (Russia), as well as the coasts of the inner islands.

== Geography ==
=== Shoreline ===
The continental part of the Okhotsk coast has a complicated shape, with many headlands and peninsulas, as well as gulfs and bays, most significant being the Sakhalin Gulf between Sakhalin and continental Siberia and Shelikhov Gulf, the northernost part of the sea. The (complete) shoreline is broken by a number of straits, most important being Nevelskoy Strait (within the Strait of Tartary), La Pérouse Strait, Lindholm Strait, Severnyy Strait, Severo-Vostochnyy Strait, .

=== Islands ===
Of islands of the Sea of Okhotsk the most significant are:

- Hokkaido
- Iony Island
- Kuril Islands
- Sakhalin
- Shantar Islands
- Spafaryev Islands
- Zavyalov Island

=== Peninsulas ===
- Mainland
  - Koni Peninsula
  - Lisyansky Peninsula
  - Staritsky Peninsula
- Kamchatka
- Hokkaido:
  - Shiretoko Peninsula
- Sakhalin:
  - Crillon Peninsula
  - Patience Peninsula
  - Schmidt Peninsula
  - Tonino-Aniva Peninsula ending in Cape Velikan
- Kuril Islands:
  - Bear (peninsula)
  - Chirip (peninsula), the location of the Chirip volcano
  - Veslovsky Peninsula in the Kurils Nature Reserve

=== Rivers ===
The total area of the basins of rivers draining into the sea is estimated 2.5. million km^{2}.

- Amur, flows into the Strait of Tartary, the largest drainage basin
- Penzhina, flows into the Penzhina Bay, the second largest drainage basin
- Okhota
- Ulya
- Taui Bay: Arman, Ola, Yana and Taui

=== Coastal populated places ===
- Hokkaido:
  - Okhotsk Subprefecture
    - Abashiri, population: 38,000
    - Monbetsu, population: 25,000
    - Shari, Hokkaido; has Utoro fishing port
- Mainland: Magadan, Okhotsk
  - Strait of Tartary: Kholmsk, Vanino, Khabarovsk Krai
- Kamchatka: Palana
- Kuril Islands: Kurilsk, Malokurilskoye, Severo-Kurilsk, Yuzhno-Kurilsk
- Sakhalin: Korsakov (by Aniva Bay), Okha, Poronaysk

== History ==
=== Prehistory and indigenous populations ===
There are settlements of the ancient Koryak culture along the coast and on some islands. There are also traces of ancient Yupik culture.

Evens, who, in particular, live in Magadan Oblast and Kamchatka, migrated out of central China around 10,000 years ago.

The Okhotsk culture is an archaeological coastal fishing and hunter-gatherer culture that developed around the southern coastal regions of the Sea of Okhotsk, including Sakhalin, northeastern Hokkaido, and the Kuril Islands during the last half of the first millennium to the early part of the second. The Okhotsk are often associated to be the ancestors of the Nivkhs, while others argue them to be identified with early Ainu-speakers. It is suggested that the bear cult, a practice shared by various Northern Eurasian peoples, the Ainu and the Nivkhs, was an important element of the Okhotsk culture but was uncommon in Jomon period Japan. Archaeological evidence indicates that the Okhotsk culture proper originated in the 5th century AD from the Susuya culture of southern Sakhalin and northwestern Hokkaido.

Negidals are considered to descend from Evenks that settled in the Amgun basin during the Iron Age. After branching off from the main Tungusic ethnic family and reaching the Okhotsk Coast, Negidals became geographically isolated.

=== Recorded history ===
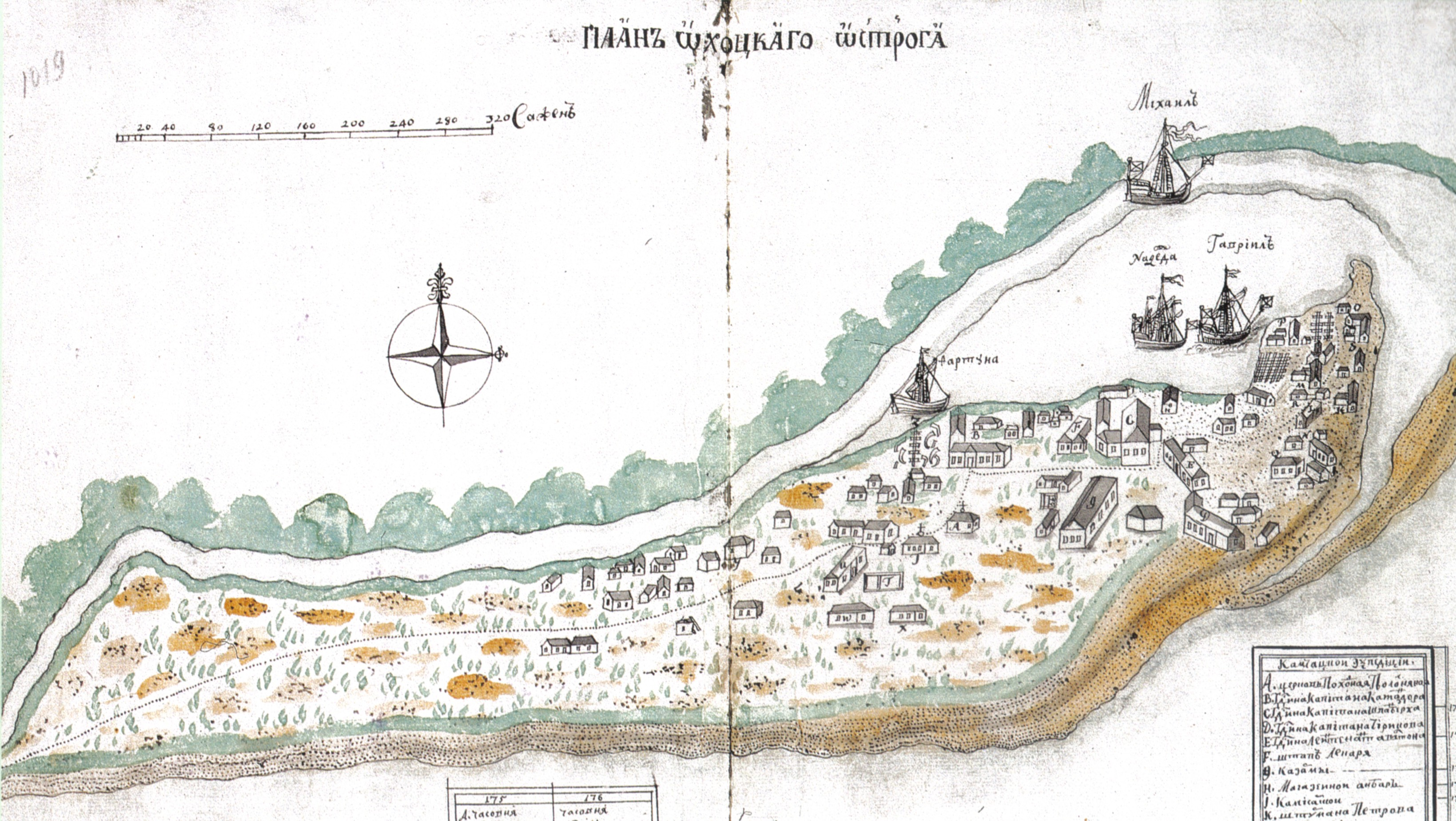
Okhotsk ostrog, 1737

The first information for Europeans about the Sea of Okhotsk was delivered by the expedition led by Vassili Poyarkov, who came to the Okhotsk coast in 1639 by the mouth of Ulya river. Six years later, in 1645, an expedition led by Ivan Moskvitin travelled by the Amur River down to its mouth. In 1647 an expedition led by Semyon Shelkovnokov (Семен Шелковников, Семейка Шелковник) traveled from Yakutsk to the mouth of Ulya and further to the mouth of Okhota River, where he built a fortified winter quarters (zimovye) in defense from the militant local population, in which place the modern Okhotsk was built.

== Economy ==
- Siberian fur trade: History of fur trade by Sea of Okhotsk

== See also ==
- Media related to Sea of Okhotsk at Wikimedia Commons
- Shiretoko National Park, Hokkaido
