= Mikhail Moiseyev =

Russian military officer and politician (1939–2022)

- Михаил Моисеев
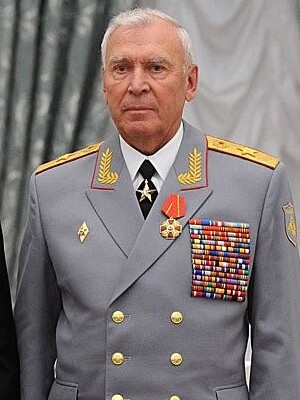
- Moiseyev in 2014

Minister of Defense of the Soviet Union (acting)
- In office 22 August 1991 – 23 August 1991
- President: Mikhail Gorbachev
- Prime Minister: Vitaly Doguzhiyev (acting)
- Preceded by: Dmitry Yazov
- Succeeded by: Yevgeny Shaposhnikov

Chief of the General Staff of the Soviet Armed Forces
- In office 4 December 1988 – 23 August 1991
- Preceded by: Sergey Akhromeyev
- Succeeded by: Vladimir Lobov

Personal details
- Born: Mikhail Alekseyevich Moiseyev; 22 January 1939 Maly Iver, Svobodnensky District, Amur Oblast, Khabarovsk Krai, Russian SFSR, USSR
- Died: 18 December 2022 (aged 83)
- Party: CPSU
- Education: Military Academy of the General Staff of the Armed Forces of Russia; Blagoveshchensk Higher Tank Command School
- Occupation: Military officer

Mikhail Alekseyevich Moiseyev (Russian: Михаил Алексеевич Моисеев; 22 January 1939 – 18 December 2022) was a Soviet-Russian military officer and politician. A member of the Communist Party, he served as commander of the 27th Guards Motor Rifle Division from 5 April 1978–21 June 1980, and Chief of the General Staff of the Soviet Armed Forces from 1988 to 1991.

Moiseyev died on 18 December 2022, at the age of 83.

== Early life ==
Moiseyev was born in a large family on 22 January 1939 in the village of Maly Iver, Svobodnensky District, Amur Oblast. His father, a kolkhoznik of the local collective farm, was conscripted into the Red Army in the mid-1930s and fought in the Battle of Lake Khasan in August 1938, and returning home after demobilization, took the opportunity offered to him as a war veteran to move with his family to the village of Chernovka, Svobodnensky District, where he became a Trackman on the Amur Railway. Moiseyev spent his childhood and first school years in Chernovka. After graduating from primary school, he studied in the railway secondary boarding school at the station of Mikhailo-Chesnokovsky on the Amur Railway. After completing his schooling, Moiseyev worked as a sailor and boilerman on auxiliary harbor ships of the Pacific Fleet at Abrek Bay in Primorsky Krai. Having reached conscription age, Moiseyev was called up for military service in November 1958.

== Military career ==
=== Early service ===
Moiseyev began his military service as a rifleman in the 198th Heavy Tank Regiment of the Far Eastern Military District's 46th Tank Division. Appointed loader of a tank crew on 1 January 1959, he became a cadet of the 97th Separate Training Tank Battalion on 25 January. Inspired by his father's military service and the deaths of four of his uncles in World War II, Moiseyev decided to pursue a military career and entered the Far Eastern Tank School at Blagoveshchensk on 1 September of that year. Graduating with high marks, he was posted to the Group of Soviet Forces in Germany, where he became a platoon commander of the 6th Guards Tank Division's 53rd Guards Tank Regiment in September 1962. In April 1964 he was transferred to hold the same position in the division's 78th Guards Heavy Tank Regiment, and, already a senior lieutenant, appointed a tank company commander in May 1966. Returning to the Soviet Union in November 1968, Moiseyev commanded a tank company of the 30th Guards Tank Division's 325th Tank Regiment in the Carpathian Military District, where he simultaneously served as battalion chief of staff. In August 1969, following promotion to captain, he entered the Frunze Military Academy for advanced officer training, where he received positive evaluations from superiors.

Graduating in June 1972 with the rank of major, Moiseyev was appointed deputy commander of the 37th Guards Tank Division's 261st Tank Regiment in the Belorussian Military District, where he spent most of the 1970s. In October of that year he became regimental chief of staff and deputy commander. Credited by superiors with raising the regiment's combat and mobilization readiness, he was selected for regimental command and in January 1974 promoted to command the regiment. Half a year later he was promoted to lieutenant colonel. The 261st received high ratings in training under Moiseyev's command and he was chosen for further advancement. Moiseyev rose rapidly to deputy division commander of the 120th Guards Motor Rifle Division in January 1976 and took command of the 50th Guards Motor Rifle Division in August of that year, receiving promotion to the rank of colonel ahead of schedule in November. With his performance assessed as superior, he returned to the Group of Soviet Forces in Germany in April 1978 to command the 27th Guards Motor Rifle Division. In February 1979, just after his 40th birthday, Moiseyev was promoted to major general.

=== High command ===
After two years in Germany, in June 1980, Moiseyev and his family moved to Moscow as he became a student of the Military Academy of the General Staff for senior command training. Graduating with honors and a gold medal, Moiseyev was appointed deputy commander of the Far Eastern Military District's 15th Army in June 1982, and already in the next year took command of the army. In February 1984 he was promoted to lieutenant general, and in July 1985 rose to chief of staff and first deputy commander of the Far Eastern Military District, on the positive recommendation of district commander Dmitry Yazov. Moiseyev succeeded to district command on Yazov's promotion to defense minister in January 1987, and in May of that year was promoted to colonel general.

=== Chief of the General Staff ===
Moiseyev was appointed chief of the General Staff of the Soviet Armed Forces and first deputy minister of defense, the second highest position in the country's military leadership, on 2 December 1988. He led the General Staff during Perestroika and the growth of the economic and social crisis in the Soviet Union, which negatively affected the armed forces. In January and February 1989 Moiseyev directed the planning of the withdraw of the Soviet forces in Afghanistan. On 15 February, when the last Soviet troops left Afghanistan, Moiseyev was promoted to the rank of army general. He took part in the preparation of international agreements between the Soviet Union and United States on offensive and conventional weapons.

=== Defence Minister ===
During the August coup that began on 19 August 1991, Moiseyev supported Yazov, after whose arrest he became acting minister of defense for one day on 22 August. With the failure of the coup on 23 August, Moiseyev was dismissed from that role and also from his post as Chief of the General Staff, and retired in November 1991. In a later interview, Moiseyev expressed his opinion on the events and answered in response to a question on his assessment of the events: "To this day I believe that the Soviet Union could and should have been preserved. Yes, it could be reformed and the political system and economy changed. There was the potential and aspiration, including in the Armed Forces."

== Later life ==
From 1992 Moiseyev was an advisor to the chairman of the Supreme Soviet of Russia. In 1994 he was awarded the title of doctor of military sciences, and in 2000 the title of professor. From 1996 he was the chief specialist, and from 1999 leading inspector of the General Staff of the Armed Forces of the Russian Federation. Simultaneously from 1998 as deputy chairman of the Coordination Council of the Chairman of the Federation Council he was involved in social programs for military servicemen and their dependents, and from November 1999 as a member of the a commission on programs for former servicemen and their families, dismissed from active duty in the course of military reforms. In 2002 he became director general of the All-Russian Center for Retraining of Officers Transferred to the Reserve. Under the leadership of Moiseyev a network of regional training centers for the retraining of officers to civilian specialties was created. In 2008 he became a general inspector and member of the Collegium of the Russian Defense Ministry.

In retirement, Moiseyev led the creation of on organizations of veterans of the General Staff. Aspiring to raise the level of the veterans' movement in the army and fleet, he initiated the formation of a broader veterans' organization and in November 2008 was elected chairman of the Council of the All-Russian Community Organization of Veterans of the Russian Armed Forces. In 2011 Moiseyev became a member of the Coordinating Council for Veterans Affairs of the Government of the Russian Federation. That year he became a member of the central council of the All-Russia People's Front, and the supervisory board of the National Center for Labor Glory. From December 2011 to December 2016 he served as a deputy representing Khabarovsk Krai in the State Duma, where he was deputy chairman of the Committee on Labor, Social Politics, and Veterans Affairs. In October 2012 Moiseyev was elected chairman of the Russian Committee of Veterans of War and Military Service of the Russian Union of Veterans. At the same time, in October 2013, he became Vice President of the International Federation of Resistance Fighters – Association of Anti-Fascists. Moiseyev died on 18 December 2022, at the age of 83.

Military offices
Preceded by Sergey Akhromeyev	Chief of the General Staff of the Armed Forces of the Soviet Union; December 1989 - 23 August 1991	Succeeded by Vladimir Lobov
