= Maly Shantar Island =

Maly Shantar Остров Малый Шантар
- Island
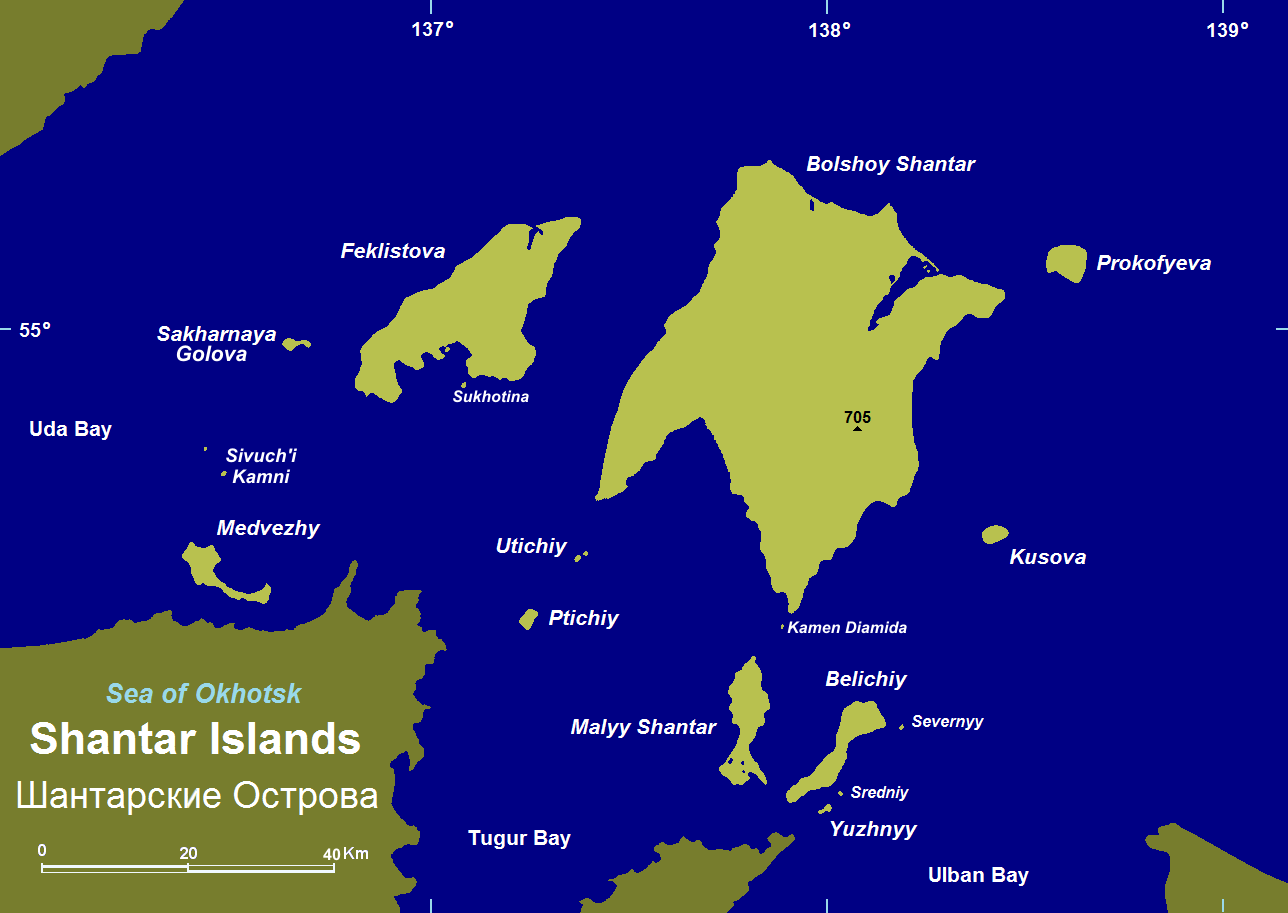
- Map of the Shantar Islands. Maly Shantar is the small, elongated island just south of Bolshoy Shantar (on the left)

- Location within Khabarovsk Krai
- Coordinates: 54°28′11″N 137°36′32″E
- Country: Russian Federation
- Federal subject: Far Eastern Federal District
- Krai: Khabarovsk Krai
- Elevation: 224 m (735 ft)

Maly Shantar Island (Russian: Остров Малый Шантар Ostrov Maly Shantar) is a small, narrow island in the northwestern Sea of Okhotsk, one of the Shantar Islands.

== Geography ==
Maly Shantar or Little Shantar Island is about 19 km (11.8 mi) long with a maximum width of 6 km (3.7 mi). It is separated from Bolshoy Shantar or Big Shantar Island to the north by Severo-Vostochnyy Strait, from Belichy Island to the east by Opasny Strait, and from the mainland to the south by Lindholm Strait. To its west lies the Shantar Sea.

== History ==
Between 1853 and 1889, American whaleships anchored off Malyy Shantar to obtain shelter from storms or send out whaleboats to hunt bowhead whales in nearby Proliv Lindgol'ma (which they called The Gut), Tugur Bay, or Ulban Bay. Their main anchorage was Long's Harbor (Abrek Bay) to the southeast of the island. They also went ashore to obtain wood.
