= Yeyriney Gulf =

Bay in Khabarovsk Krai, Russia

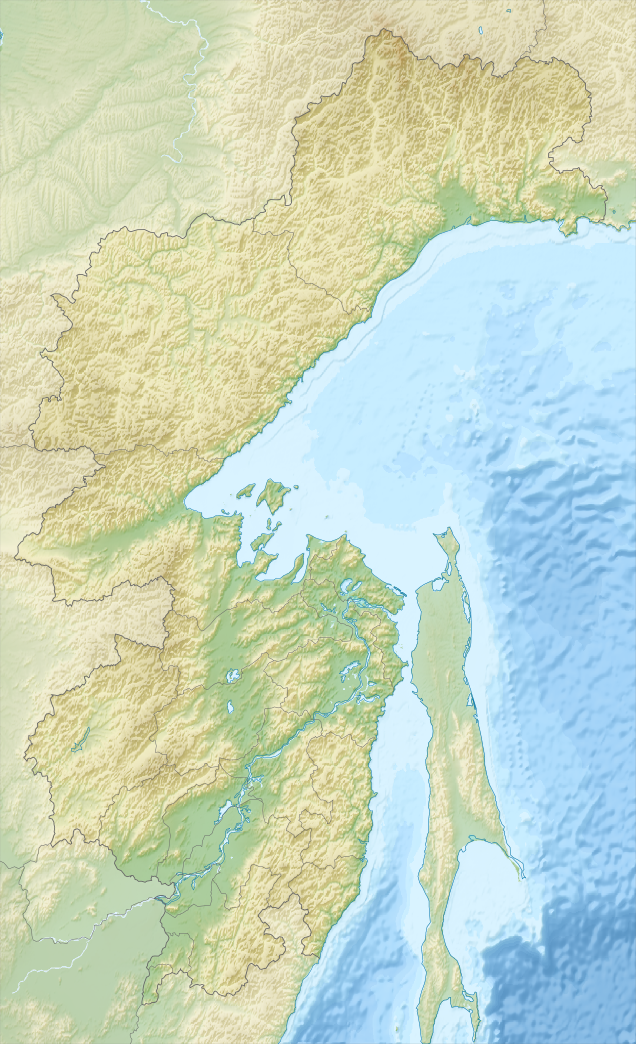
- Location in Khabarovsk Krai
- Location: Russian Far East
- Coordinates: 59°22′N 145°53′E
- Ocean/sea sources: Sea of Okhotsk
- Basin countries: Russia
- Max. width: 6.43 km (4.00 mi)

Yeyriney Gulf (Russian: Ейринейская губа, Yeyrineyskaya Guba) is a small bay in Khabarovsk Krai, Russian Federation.

== Geography ==
Yeyriney Gulf is located on the northern coast of the Sea of Okhotsk. It lies to the west of the mountainous Lisyansky Peninsula and is entered between Cape Shil'kan to the west and Cape Yeyrineysky to the east. The gulf is 6.43 km (about 4 mi) wide and about 24 m (79 ft) deep at its halfway point. Its head is divided into two recesses by Cape Kekurnyy.

== History ==
American whaleships sent whaleboats into the gulf to chase bowhead whales in the 1840s.
