= Mudyug (icebreaker) =

Russian icebreaker built in 1982

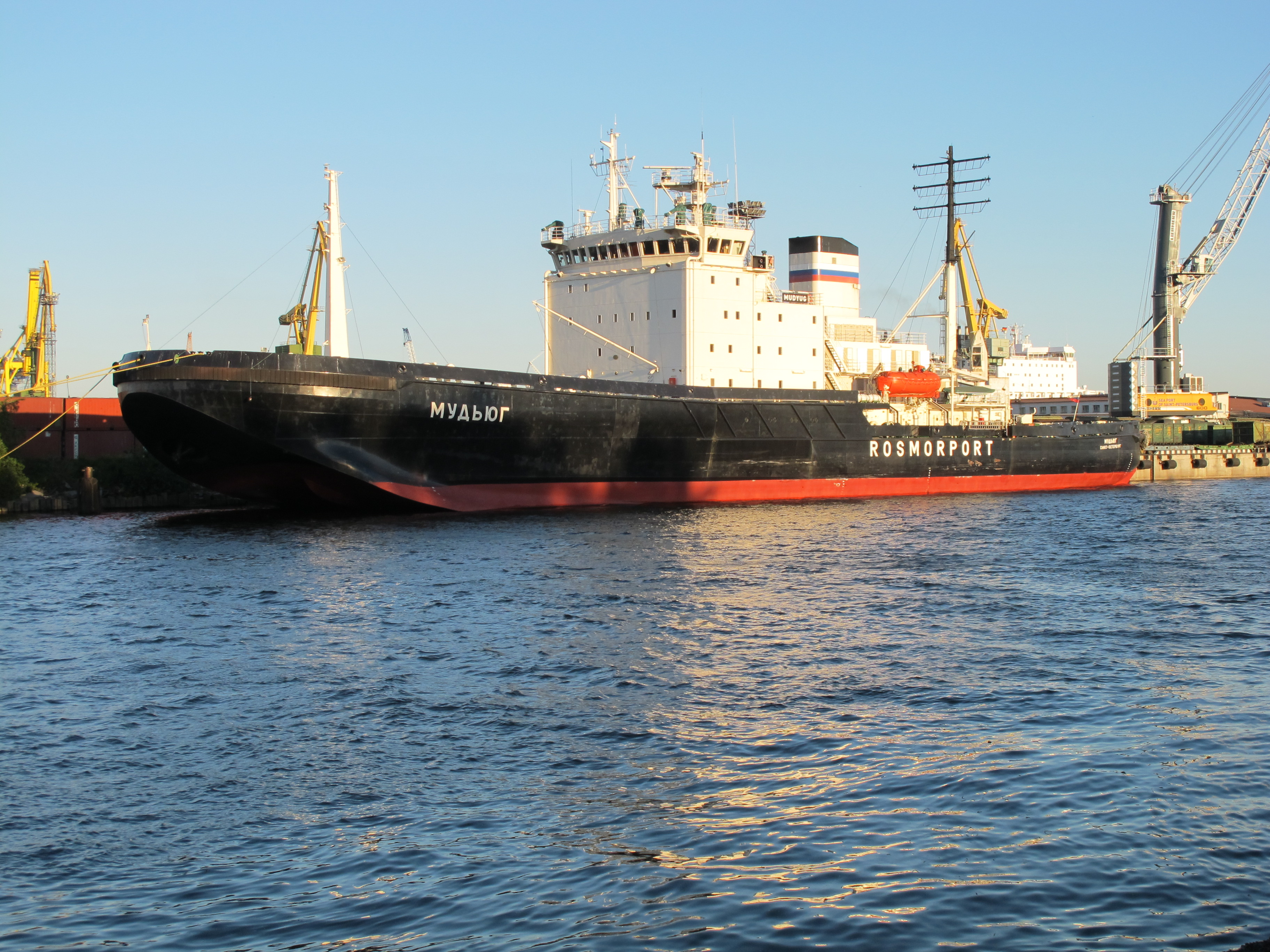
- Mudyug was rebuilt with an unconventional Thyssen-Waas icebreaking bow in 1986

History

Russia
- Name: Mudyug (Мудьюг)
- Namesake: Mudyug Island
- Owner: Northern Shipping Company (1982–2006); Rosmorport (2006–present)
- Port of registry: Arkhangelsk, Soviet Union (1982–1992); Arkhangelsk, Russia (1992–2006); Saint Petersburg, Russia (2006–present)
- Ordered: April 1980
- Builder: Wärtsilä Helsinki shipyard, Finland
- Cost: FIM 400 million (1980; three ships)
- Yard number: 436
- Laid down: 30 December 1980
- Launched: 16 April 1982
- Sponsored by: Viktor Vladimirov
- Completed: 29 October 1982
- In service: 1982–present
- Refit: October 1986
- Identification: IMO number: 8009181; MMSI number: 273910100; Call sign: UGUU
- Status: In service

General characteristics (as built)
- Type: Icebreaker
- Displacement: 6,138 t (6,041 long tons) (maximum)
- Length: 92.0 m (301.8 ft) (including towing notch); 88.5 m (290.4 ft) (hull); 78.5 m (257.5 ft) (dwl)
- Beam: 21.2 m (69.6 ft) (hull); 20.0 m (65.6 ft) (dwl)
- Draught: 6.5 m (21 ft) (maximum); 6.0 m (20 ft) (dwl)
- Depth: 10.5 m (34 ft)
- Ice class: LL4
- Installed power: 4 × Wärtsilä 8R32 (4 × 2,390 kW)
- Propulsion: Two shafts; controllable pitch propellers
- Speed: 16.5 knots (30.6 km/h; 19.0 mph)

General characteristics (after refit)
- Tonnage: 6,954 GT; 2,087 NT; 2,920 DWT
- Displacement: 8,154 t (8,025 long tons)
- Length: 111.56 m (366.0 ft)
- Beam: 22.20 m (72.8 ft)
- Draught: 6.82 m (22.4 ft)
- Notes: Otherwise same as built

Mudyug (Russian: Мудьюг) is a Russian icebreaker and the lead ship of a series of three subarctic icebreakers built at Wärtsilä Helsinki shipyard in Finland in 1982–1983. The vessel's non-rebuilt sister ships are Magadan and Dikson.

Mudyug was rebuilt with a new Thyssen-Waas icebreaking bow at Nordseewerke in 1986.

== Design ==
Mudyug was originally built with a overall length of 88.5 metres (290.4 ft), or 92.0 metres (301.8 ft) if the towing notch is included, and a maximum beam of 21.2 metres (69.6 ft). However, the 1986 conversion increased the vessel's hull length to 111.56 metres (366 ft) and beam to 22.20 metres (73 ft) at the widest point of the hull. When loaded to the maximum draught of 6.82 metres (22 ft), the icebreaker has a displacement of 8,154 tonnes (8,025 long tons), about 30 % greater than that of the non-rebuilt 6,200-tonne (6,100-long-ton) sister ships. The vessel's ice class, LL4, is intended for icebreaking operations primarily in ports and coastal areas.

Unlike most icebreakers, Mudyug has a diesel-mechanical propulsion system where the vessel's four 2,390-kilowatt (3,210 hp) 8-cylinder Wärtsilä 8R32 medium-speed main engines are coupled in pairs through Lohmann & Stolterfoht Navilus twin-input/single-output single-stage reduction gearboxes to propeller shafts driving 4-metre (13 ft) four-bladed stainless steel KaMeWa controllable pitch propellers. In order to protect the main engines from large torque variations during icebreaking operations and to prevent the propellers from stopping when the blades come in contact with ice, each shaft has a 11.5-tonne (11.3-long-ton; 12.7-short-ton) flywheel to increase rotational inertia of the drivetrain. Onboard electrical power is generated by three Wärtsilä-Vasa 624TS auxiliary diesel engines with 960 kVA alternators. Mudyug's icebreaking capability is further increased by a hull lubrication system and an active heeling system. During the 1986 conversion, the original Wärtsilä Air Bubbling System (WABS) was replaced with a Jastram-HSVA water deluge system.

Mudyug's bollard pull is 914 kilonewtons (93 tf) when operating with a continuous propulsion power of 7,000 kilowatts (9,400 hp). However, for short-term operation the icebreaker can use its maximum shaft output of 9,100 kilowatts (12,200 hp) to generate a bollard pull of 1,400 kilonewtons (140 tf). The vessel has a service speed of 16.5 knots (30.6 km/h; 19.0 mph) in open water and, prior to rebuilding its icebreaking bow, could maintain a continuous speed of 2 knots (3.7 km/h; 2.3 mph) when breaking 1 metre (3.3 ft) thick level ice.

== History ==
=== Development and construction ===
In 1977, Wärtsilä began developing a new icebreaker concept in close co-operation with experts from the Soviet Union. Although the Finnish shipbuilder had delivered more icebreaking vessels than any other shipyard in the world, they had all been diesel-electric vessels where diesel generators powered electric propulsion motors driving fixed-pitch propellers. In the new icebreakers, this fairly expensive specialized drivetrain would be replaced with cheaper and more efficient mechanical transmission where the main diesel engines would be connected to controllable pitch propellers through a reduction gearbox. An extensive research program was initiated by Wärtsilä Arctic Design and Marketing (WADAM) to ensure that the new concept was viable and that the problems encountered the recently commissioned United States Coast Guard Polar-class icebreakers would be avoided.

In April 1980, Wärtsilä and the Soviet Union signed a FIM 400 million shipbuilding contract for the construction of three icebreakers to escort ships in the freezing subarctic ports. The vessels, first of which would be delivered in late 1982 and the two following ones in 1983, would be stationed in the Barents Sea, Sea of Okhotsk and Baltic Sea.

The lead ship, Mudyug, was laid down at Hietalahti shipyard on 30 December 1980 and launched together with the second icebreaker of the series, Magadan, on 16 April 1982. Shortely before the delivery of the vessel on 29 October 1982, Mudyug's engine room accidentally flooded with water at quayside due to a faulty seacock.

==== 1986 rebuilding ====
In October 1986, Mudyug was retrofitted with new bow with the intention of improving the vessel's icebreaking capability by a factor of 1.5 without increasing its propulsion power. The icebreaker's traditional wedge-shaped bow was replaced with a so-called Thyssen-Waas bow developed by Thyssen Nordseewerke in cooperation with the Hamburg Ship Model Basin (Hamburgische Schiffbau-Versuchsanstalt; HSVA). The pontoon-shaped bow, which broke ice by shearing instead of traditional bending, had been previously tested in the early 1980s on the 55-metre (180 ft) German icebreaker Max Waldeck.

While initial ice trials in Svalbard demonstrated that the new bow had improved Mudyug's icebreaking capability significantly, the barge-like bow worked well only in unbroken level ice. In broken ice and rubble on shipping lanes, it had a tendency of pushing the ice in front of the vessel. Due to these limitations, Mudyug was eventually considered unsuitable for icebreaking in the Arctic seas and transferred to the Baltic Sea in the late 1990s.

=== Career ===
Mudyug was delivered to the Northern Shipping Company in 1982 and was deployed to escort ships to and from Arkhangelsk in the White Sea. In July 2006, the icebreaker was transferred to Rosmorport and its homeport changed to Saint Petersburg where the vessel had already operated since the late 1990s. As of 2023, Mudyug remains in service in the Gulf of Finland.

==== Notable events ====
On 17 November 2013, Mudyug's lifeboat was destroyed when a strong gust of wind pushed the passenger ferry Princess Maria against the docked icebreaker. There were no injuries onboard either vessel and the ferry docked safely at the passenger terminal after the collision.

On 25 January 2018, bulk carrier S-Bronco collided with Mudyug outside Saint Petersburg. While the merchant ship suffered superficial damage above waterline, there was no visible damage on the icebreaker.

Mudyug has regularly participated in the annual Festival of Icebreakers in Saint Petersburg. The icebreaker has been open to visitors in four consecutive years between 2016 and 2019.
