= Ushki Bay =

Bay in Khabarovsk Krai, Russia

- Shepherdess Bay
- залив Ушки (Russian)
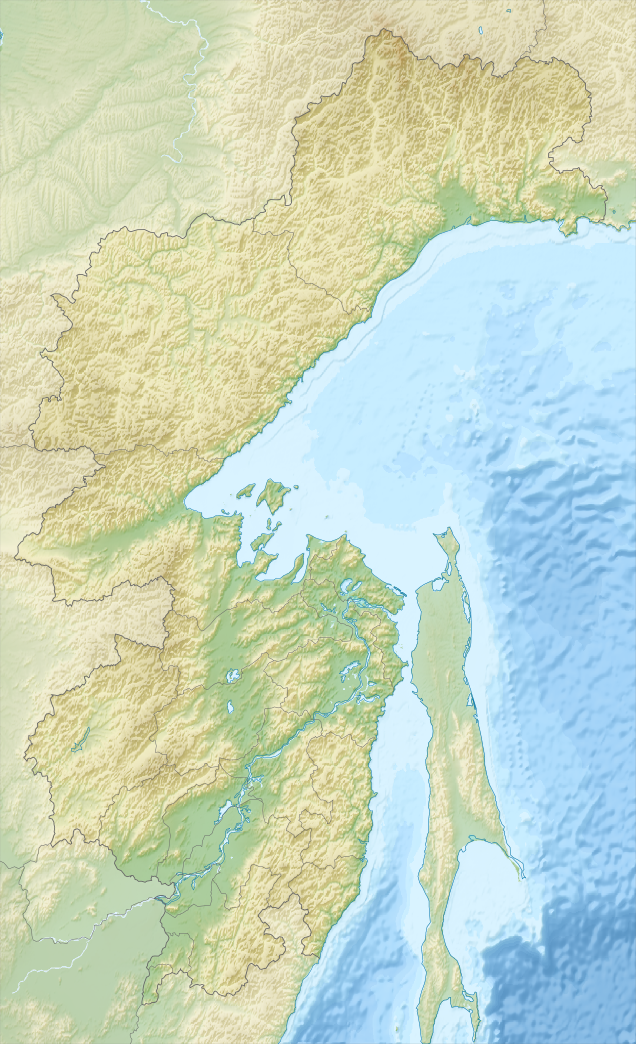
- Location in Khabarovsk Krai
- Location: Russian Far East
- Coordinates: 59°23′N 146°28′E
- Ocean/sea sources: Sea of Okhotsk
- Basin countries: Russia
- Max. width: 24 km (15 mi)
- Average depth: 26 m (85 ft)

Ushki Bay (Russian: Zaliv Ushki) is a small bay in Khabarovsk Krai, Russian Federation.

== Geography ==
Ushki Bay is located on the northern coast of the Sea of Okhotsk. It lies to the east of the mountainous Lisyansky Peninsula. The bay is 24 km (15 mi) wide and lies between Cape Yelagin to the west and Cape Rzhavyy to the east – the latter is visible from a great distance on a clear day as its red color contrasts with the brown color of the coastline on either side of it.

The depth of the northern part of the bay reaches 26 m (85 ft).

== History ==
American whaleships cruised for bowhead whales in the bay in the 1840s and 1850s. They called it Shepherdess Bay, after a Mystic ship that frequented the area at the time.
