= Dikson (icebreaker) =

Russian icebreaker

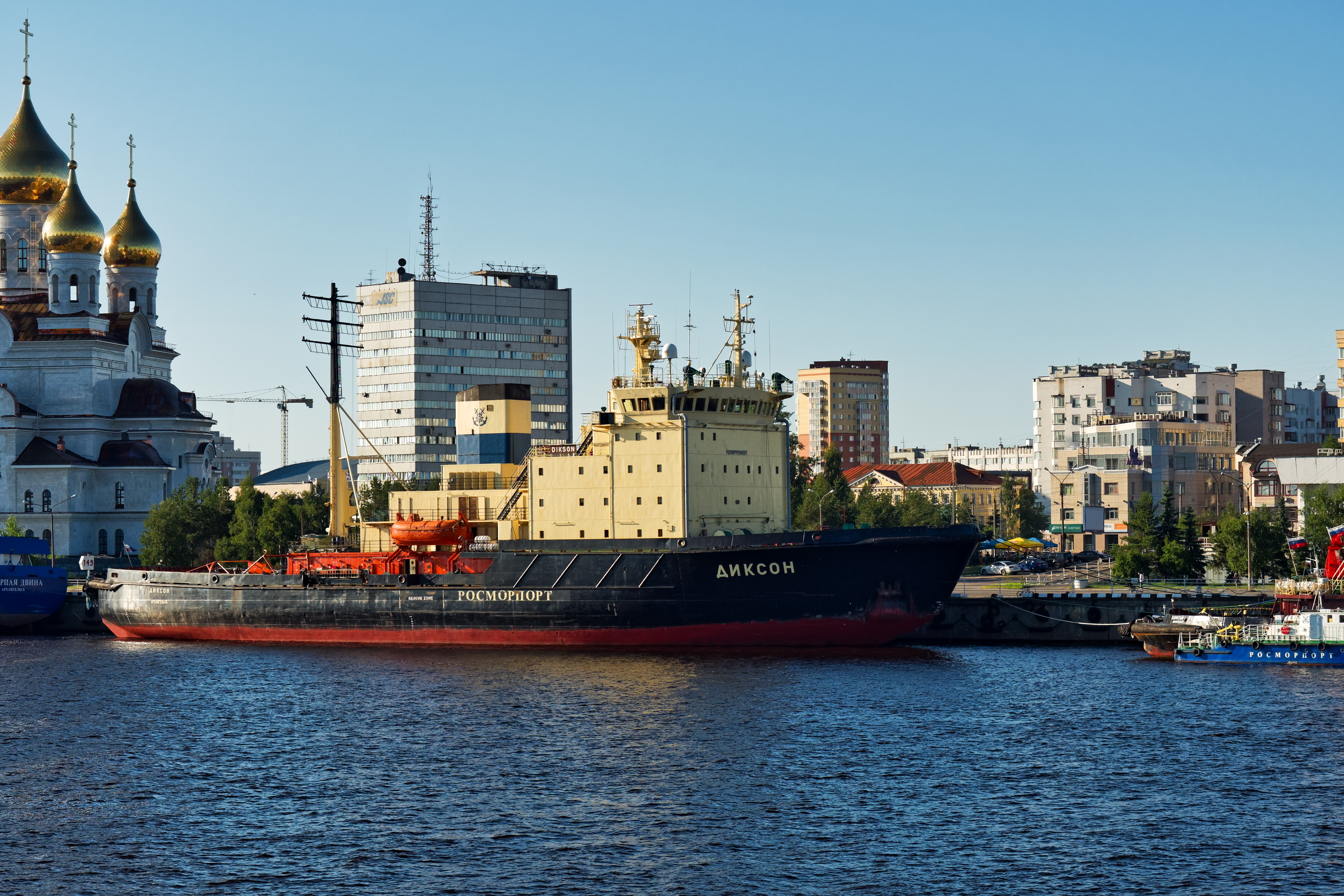
- Dikson in Arkhangelsk in July 2018

History

Russia
- Name: Dikson (Диксон)
- Namesake: Dikson
- Owner: Murmansk Shipping Company (1983–1986); Northern Shipping Company (1986–2006); Rosmorport (2006–present)
- Port of registry: Murmansk, Soviet Union (1983–1986); Arkhangelsk, Soviet Union (1986–1992); Arkhangelsk, Russia (1992–present)
- Ordered: April 1980
- Builder: Wärtsilä Helsinki shipyard, Finland
- Cost: FIM 400 million (1980; three ships)
- Yard number: 438
- Laid down: 6 January 1981
- Launched: 9 July 1982
- Completed: 17 March 1983
- In service: 1983–present
- Identification: IMO number: 8009208; MMSI number: 273912100; Call sign: UHRL
- Status: In service

General characteristics
- Type: Icebreaker
- Tonnage: 5,342 GT; 1,603 NT; 2,281 DWT
- Displacement: 6,583 t (6,479 long tons) (maximum)
- Length: 92.0 m (301.8 ft) (including towing notch); 88.5 m (290.4 ft) (hull); 78.5 m (257.5 ft) (dwl)
- Beam: 21.2 m (69.6 ft) (hull); 20.0 m (65.6 ft) (dwl)
- Draught: 6.8 m (22.3 ft) (maximum); 6.0 m (19.7 ft) (dwl)
- Depth: 10.5 m (34.4 ft)
- Ice class: LL4
- Installed power: 4 × Wärtsilä 8R32 (4 × 2,390 kW)
- Propulsion: Two shafts; controllable pitch propellers
- Speed: 16.5 knots (30.6 km/h; 19.0 mph)

Dikson (Russian: Диксон) is a Russian icebreaker and the final vessel in a series of three subarctic icebreakers built at Wärtsilä Helsinki shipyard in Finland in 1982–1983. The vessel's sister ships are Mudyug (rebuilt in 1986) and Magadan.

== Design ==
Dikson's hull is 88.5 metres (290.4 ft) long overall and has a beam of 21.2 metres (69.6 ft) at its widest point. However, the towing notch increases the extreme length of the vessel to 92.0 metres (301.8 ft) while the inclined sides reduce the hull width to 20.0 metres (65.6 ft) at the design waterline. When loaded to the maximum draught of 6.8 metres (22.3 ft), the icebreaker has a displacement of 6,583 tonnes (6,479 long tons). The vessel's ice class, LL4, is intended for icebreaking operations primarily in ports and coastal areas. The maximum thickness of the shell plating in the bow region is 35 millimetres (1.4 in).

Unlike most icebreakers, Dikson has a diesel-mechanical propulsion system where the vessel's four 2,390-kilowatt (3,210 hp) 8-cylinder Wärtsilä 8R32 medium-speed main engines are coupled in pairs through Lohmann & Stolterfoht Navilus twin-input/single-output single-stage reduction gearboxes to propeller shafts driving 4-metre (13 ft) four-bladed stainless steel KaMeWa controllable pitch propellers. In order to protect the main engines from large torque variations during icebreaking operations and to prevent the propellers from stopping when the blades come in contact with ice, each shaft has a 11.5-tonne (11.3-long-ton; 12.7-short-ton) flywheel to increase rotational inertia of the drivetrain. The vessel's icebreaking capability is further increased by a Wärtsilä Air Bubbling System (WABS) lubricating the hull as well as an active heeling system. Onboard electrical power is generated by three Wärtsilä-Vasa 624TS auxiliary diesel engines with 960 kVA alternators.

Dikson's bollard pull is 914 kilonewtons (93 tf) when operating with a continuous propulsion power of 7,000 kilowatts (9,400 hp). However, for short-term operation the icebreaker can use its maximum shaft output of 9,100 kilowatts (12,200 hp) to generate a bollard pull of 1,400 kilonewtons (140 tf). The vessel has a service speed of 16.5 knots (30.6 km/h; 19.0 mph) in open water and maintain a continuous speed of 2 knots (3.7 km/h; 2.3 mph) when breaking 1 metre (3.3 ft) thick level ice.

== History ==
=== Development and construction ===
In 1977, Wärtsilä began developing a new icebreaker concept in close co-operation with experts from the Soviet Union. Although the Finnish shipbuilder had delivered more icebreaking vessels than any other shipyard in the world, they had all been diesel-electric vessels where diesel generators powered electric propulsion motors driving fixed-pitch propellers. In the new icebreakers, this fairly expensive specialized drivetrain would be replaced with cheaper and more efficient mechanical transmission where the main diesel engines would be connected to controllable pitch propellers through a reduction gearbox. An extensive research program was initiated by Wärtsilä Arctic Design and Marketing (WADAM) to ensure that the new concept was viable and that the problems encountered the recently commissioned United States Coast Guard Polar-class icebreakers would be avoided.

In April 1980, Wärtsilä and the Soviet Union signed a FIM 400 million shipbuilding contract for the construction of three icebreakers to escort ships in the freezing subarctic ports. The vessels, first of which would be delivered in late 1982 and the two following ones in 1983, would be stationed in the Barents Sea, Sea of Okhotsk and Baltic Sea.

Dikson, the third and final Mudyug-class icebreaker, was laid down at Hietalahti shipyard at the same time with the second vessel of the series, Magadan on 6 January 1981, and launched on 9 July 1982. The vessel was delivered on 17 March 1983.

=== Career ===
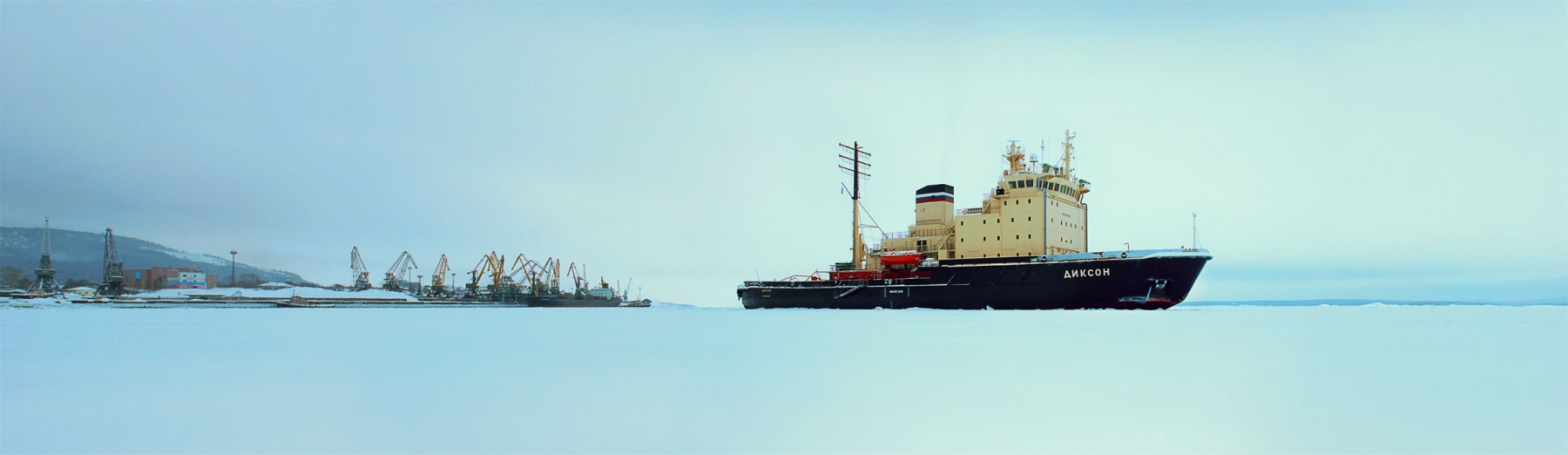
Dikson in 2019.

While originally designed primarily for subarctic waters, Dikson was handed to the Murmansk Shipping Company and initially sent to its namesake port in the Kara Sea to escort ships transporting ore from Dudinka along the Yenisei river. In 1986, the icebreaker was transferred to Northern Shipping Company and moved to Arkhangelsk in the White Sea. In 2006, Dikson was transferred to Rosmorport, the executive body that manages state property and helps transport ships. The Dikson remains in service as of 2023.

==== Notable events ====
Dikson was one of the numerous icebreakers involved in the shipping crisis in the Soviet Eastern Arctic where unprecedented ice conditions caused a major disturbance to shipping at the end of the 1983 navigating season.

In 2012, Dikson was used to conduct seismic mapping in the Barents Sea. For this purpose, the icebreaker was fitted with a streamer and associated equipment in Norway.

In 2019, Dikson towed the floating nuclear power plant Akademik Lomonosov to Pevek. The convoy left Murmansk on 23 August and sailed 2,640 nautical miles (4,890 km; 3,040 mi) along the Northern Sea Route until arriving to its destination on 10 September ahead of schedule.

In 2022, Dikson joined the Arktika, Polar King, Inzhenier Trubin, Sevmorput, and Kapitan Dranitsyn to deliver a copper mining project's construction materials in the town of Pevek. Arktika escorted the rest of the ships in the fleet into the Barents Sea in late February.
