= Shantar Sea =

Part of the Sea of Okhotsk

Coordinates: 54°40′N 137°00′E

The Shantar Sea (Russian: Шантарское море) is a small coastal sea in the northwestern Sea of Okhotsk.

It is bounded to the north by Bolshoy Shantar Island, to the east by Malyy Shantar Island, and to the south by Tugur Bay.

== History ==
The sea was frequented by American whaleships hunting bowhead whales between 1853 and 1874. Russian schooners from Mamga also cruised for bowheads in the sea from 1865 to 1871.
