= Magadan (disambiguation) =

Magadan is a city in Russia.

Magadan may also refer to:

- Magadan Oblast, a federal subject of Russia
- Magadan (icebreaker), a Russian icebreaker
- Alan Magadán, a Mexican tennis player
- Dave Magadan, an American baseball player
- Magadan, name used in Greek manuscripts of Matthew, according to some scholars the ancient city of Magdala

== See also ==
- Magada (disambiguation)
- Magadha (disambiguation)
- Magadhan languages, a group of eastern Indo-Aryan languages of India
