= Belichy Island =

Belichy Беличий остров
- Island
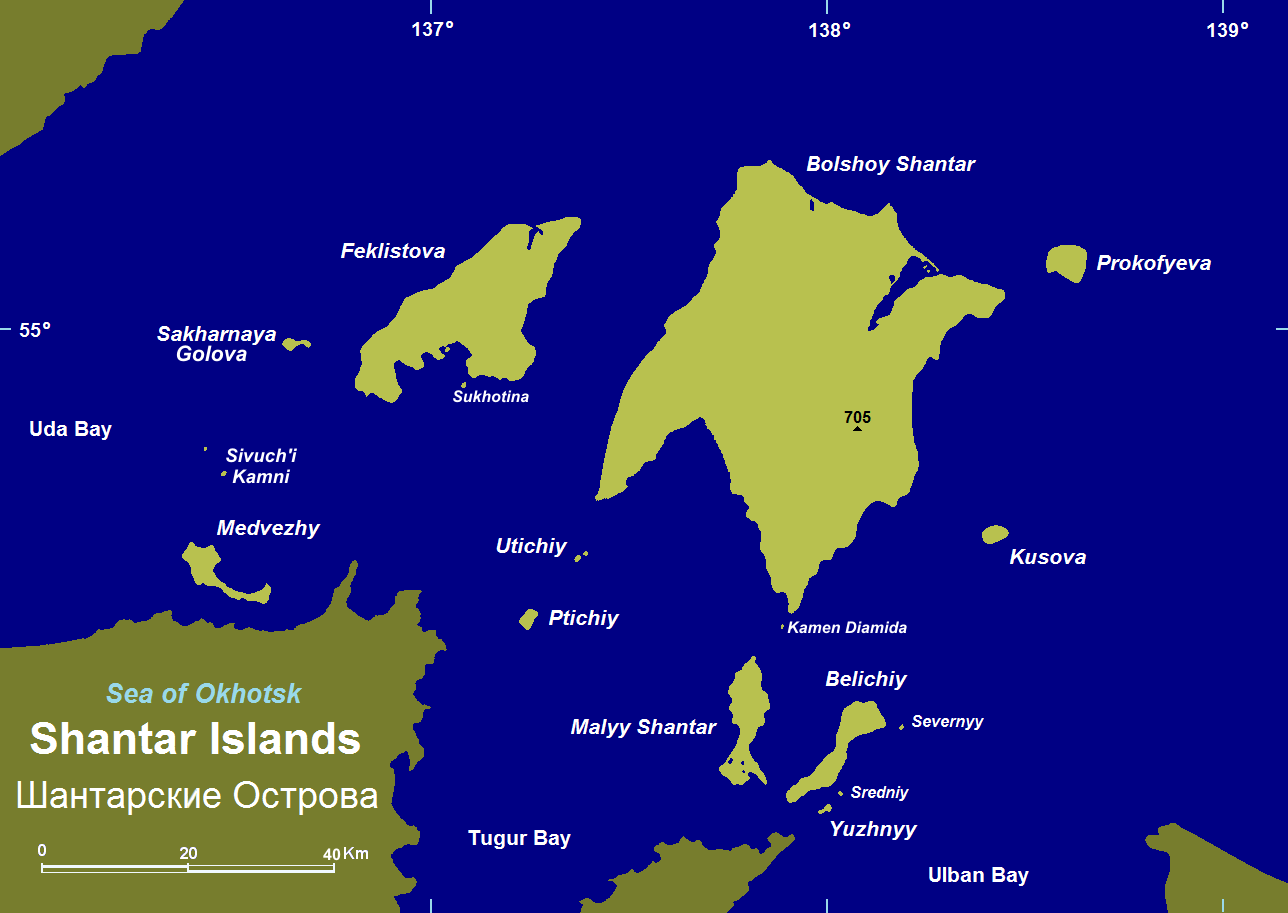
- Map of the Shantar Islands. Belichy is the smaller, elongated island to the south of Bolshoy Shantar.

- Location within Khabarovsk Krai
- Coordinates: 54°25′40″N 137°50′20″E
- Country: Russian Federation
- Federal subject: Far Eastern Federal District
- Krai: Khabarovsk Krai

Area
  - Total: 70 km^{2} (27 sq mi)
- Elevation: 453 m (1,486 ft)

Belichy Island (Russian: Беличий остров, Belichy Ostrov, literally: "Squirrel Island") is a narrow island in the northwestern Sea of Okhotsk, one of the Shantar Islands.

== Geography ==
The island is 20.3 km in length, with a maximum width of about 5 km. It is covered in larch forests.

Belichy Island is separated from Bolshoy Shantar Island to the north by Proliv Severo-Vostochny, from Maly Shantar Island to the west by Proliv Opasny, and from the mainland to the south by Lindholm Strait. To its east lies Academy Bay.

== History ==
Belichy was frequented by American whaleships hunting bowhead whales between 1857 and 1889.
