= Abrek Bay (Khabarovsk Krai) =

Bay on Maly Shantar Island, Russia

Coordinates: 54°23′N 137°37′E

Abrek Bay (Russian: Бухта Абрек, tr.: Bukhta Abrek) is a small bay on the southeast coast of Maly Shantar Island, one of the Shantar Islands, in the western Sea of Okhotsk. It is 2.4 km (1.5 mi) wide at its entrance and about 1.6 km (1 mi) deep. Spring tides rise about 4.5 m (15 ft) and neaps about 2.7 m (9 ft).

== History ==
Between 1856 and 1892, American and British whaleships anchored in the bay to chase whales or seek shelter from gales. They called it Long's Harbor, after Thomas W. Long, captain of the ship India (433 tons), of New London, who frequented the area in the mid-1850s. On 30 September 1892, the steam schooner Nautilus, of Shanghai, was wrecked in the bay during a heavy squall.
