= Severo-Vostochnyy Strait =

Strait in the Sea of Okhotsk

Coordinates: 54°34′N 137°45′E

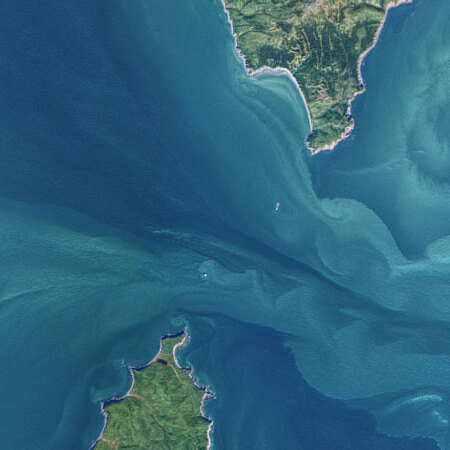
Tidal Vortices in the Sea of Okhotsk around the Shantar Islands

Severo-Vostochnyy Strait (Russian: Proliv Severo-Vostochnyy or "Northeast Strait") is a strait located in the western Sea of Okhotsk. It separates Bolshoy Shantar Island to the north from Malyy Shantar Island to the south. It is divided in two by several rocks that rise to 15 to 18 m (50 to 60 ft) and has reefs extending from both sides. It also has swift tidal currents, with the flood setting to the west and the ebb to the east.

== History ==
American boat crews searching for bowhead whales sometimes used the strait, though the ships themselves seldom entered it. They called it Rocky Passage.
