= Lindholm Strait =

Strait in the Sea of Okhotsk

Coordinates: 54°20′N 137°36′E

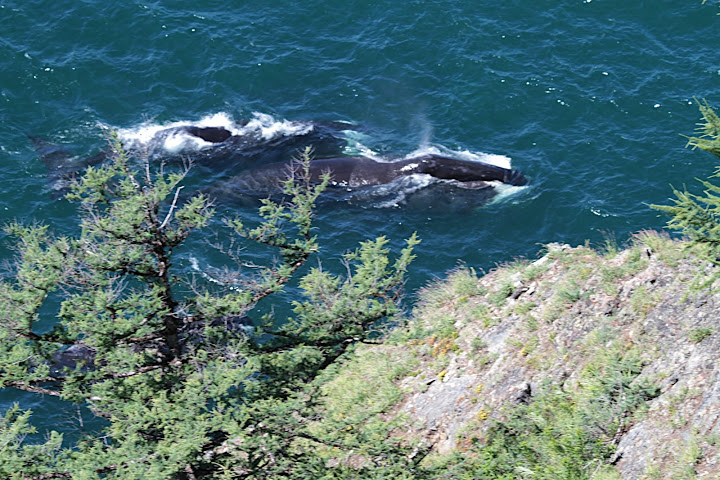
Bowhead whales swimming near a cliff in Lindholm Strait

Lindholm Strait (Russian: Proliv Lindgol'ma) is a strait in the northwestern Sea of Okhotsk. It separates Malyy Shantar and Belichiy Islands to the north from the Tugur Peninsula to the south. At its narrowest it is only 3.2 km (2 mi) wide. Tides are semidiurnal. Springs rise 4.9 m (16 ft), while neaps rise 3.6 m (11.8 ft). The flood current sets west, while the stronger ebb current flows in the opposite direction. The former creates large eddies and whirlpools. Tidal currents vary from 3.5 to 6 knots.

In the summer bowhead whales can be seen in the strait.

== History ==
The strait was frequented by American whaleships hunting bowhead whales between 1855 and 1889. They called it Shantar Gut or simply The Gut. They hunted whales in the strait or passed through it on favorable tides as they traveled back and forth between the Tugur and Ulban Bays.
