= Magada =

Magada may refer to:

- Madaba, an alternative spelling of a city in central Jordan
- Magadha, an alternative spelling of an ancient kingdom and region of India

== See also ==
- Magadan (disambiguation)
- Magadha (disambiguation)
- Magadha period, period of Ancient Indian history relating to the Magadha region
- Magadhi Prakrit, an Indo-Aryan language of Ancient India
- Magadhan or Eastern Indo-Aryan languages, a group of Indic languages of eastern India, descending from Magadhi Prakrit
  - Magahi language or Magadhi, an Eastern Indo-Aryan language of Bihar, India
