= Kolskaya (jack-up rig) =

Jack-up rig that operated in the Russian Far East

Coordinates: 49°31′N 148°14′E

- Kolskaya aboard a heavy lift ship

History
- Name: Kolskaya
- Owner: Arktikmor Neftegaz Razvedka, a subsidiary of Zarubezhneft
- Port of registry: Murmansk Russia
- Builder: Rauma Repola, Pori (Finland)
- Completed: 1985
- Out of service: 18 December 2011
- Fate: Capsized and sank in the; Sea of Okhotsk

General characteristics
- Length: 69.25 m (227.2 ft)
- Beam: 80 m (260 ft)
- Crew: 102

Kolskaya was a jack-up rig operating in the Russian Far East. It was built by Rauma-Repola in Pori, Finland in 1985 and was owned by the Russian company ArktikmorNeftegazRazvedka (AMNGR), a subsidiary of Zarubezhneft.

Kolskaya was an independent leg cantilever type jack-up rig. It was 69 metres (226 ft) long and 80 metres (260 ft) wide, and could accommodate up to 102 people. Its rated water depth for operations was 328 feet (100 m). Its drilling depth was 21,325 feet (6,500 m).

== Capsize and sinking ==
On December 18, 2011, the rig, which was under tow during a fierce storm, capsized and sank in the Sea of Okhotsk. It was being towed by the icebreaker Magadan and the tugboat Neftegaz-55 having just completed an exploration well for Gazprom off the Kamchatka Peninsula. The incident happened some 200 kilometres (120 mi) off the coast of Sakhalin island, in waters more than 1,000 metres (3,300 ft) deep. In terms of operational safety, the towing operation's compliance with best practices was doubtful since the platform’s manufacturer explicitly stated that "towing is prohibited in the winter, in winter seasonal zones."

A search and rescue effort began as soon as the rig sank and was halted five days later on December 22. Of the 67 people known to have been aboard Kolskaya, 14 had been rescued and 36 more were listed as missing. Only 17 bodies had been recovered. With 53 declared missing or dead, it was the largest number of casualties in an accident the Russian oil sector has ever experienced.
