= Lisyansky Peninsula =

Peninsula in Khabarovsk Krai, Russia

- Peninsula
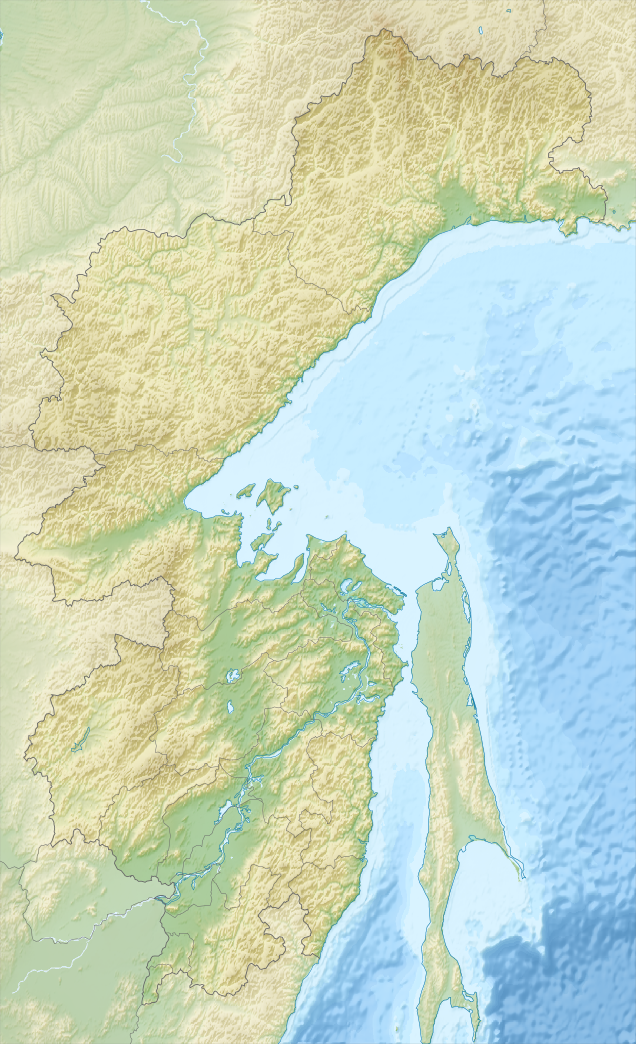
- Coordinates: 59°19′N 146°06′E
- Location: Khabarovsk Krai, Russia
- Offshore water bodies: Sea of Okhotsk

Area
  - Total: Russian Far East
- Elevation: 245 m (804 ft)

Lisyansky Peninsula (Russian: Poluostrov Lisyanskogo) is a mountainous peninsula in Khabarovsk Krai, Russian Federation. Cape Duga forms its southern terminus. To its west lies Yeyriney Gulf and to its east Ushki Bay.
