= History of the fur trade by the Sea of Okhotsk =

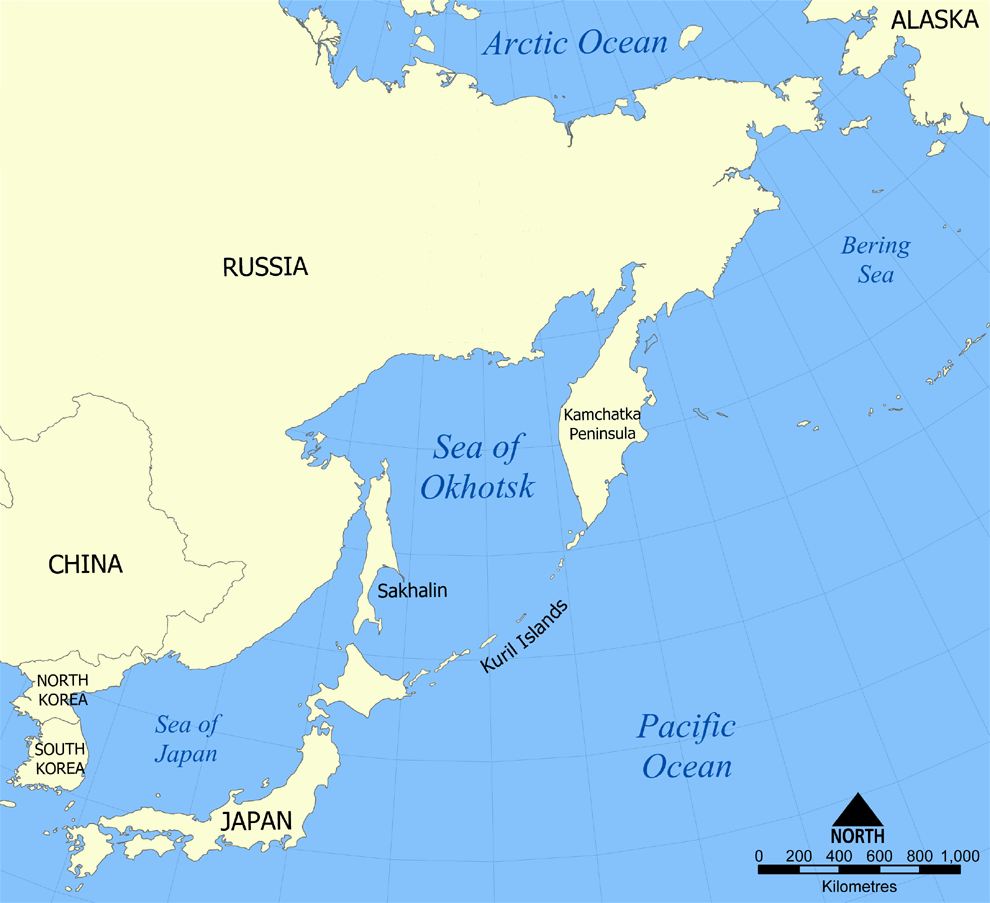
Map of the Sea of Okhotsk

The history of fur trade by Sea of Okhotsk is an important part of the history of the Siberian fur trade. When Russians reached the Pacific coast their river boats were no longer useful. Once knowledge of ship building and navigation was slowly moved across Siberia they advanced to Alaska. The Alaska trade was controlled from the Okhotsk coast until the whole system broke up around 1860. A major problem was moving supplies over the coastal mountains. For background see Siberian River Routes.

== Landmarks ==
Continental landmarks of the Sea of Okhotsk Coast may be classified as follows.

The western section is historically the most important. It runs northeast about 700 km (430 mi) from Uda Bay to the town of Okhotsk. At the westernmost point of the Sea of Okhotsk is the Uda River which was the Russo-Chinese border from the Treaty of Nerchinsk (1689) to the Treaty of Aigun (1859). To the east is Uda Bay and the Shantar Islands. About 260 km (160 mi) up the coast is Ayan with its good harbor but poor communications inland. 350 km (220 mi) northeast is the mouth of the Ulya River where the Russians first saw the Pacific. 70 km (43 mi) northeast is the mouth of the southeast-flowing Urak river (an important route to the coast) and 25 km (16 mi) further is the town of Okhotsk where the south-flowing the Okhota River and Kukhtui River join to make a poor but usable harbor.

East-West section: The east-west section runs about 680 km (420 mi) from Okhotsk to the P'yagin Peninsula. About 100 km (62 mi) east of Okhotsk is one of the Inya Rivers. The coast soon becomes rocky. About 320 km (200 mi) east of Okhotsk is the rectangular Taui Bay. At the northwest corner of the Bay are the mouths of the Taui River and a Yana River (not the Arctic one). Near the northeast corner is the good harbor of Nagayev Bay where, in 1929, the Nagayevo settlement was built which grew into a GULAG city of Magadan with its road north to the Kolyma gold fields. 240 km (150 mi) east of Magadan the east-west section ends at the P'yagin Peninsula and the Yamsky Islands.

Shelikhov Bay: The coast runs northeast forming the west side of the Shelikhov Bay. One of the Yama Rivers enters at the base of the P'yagin Peninsula. 400 km (250 mi) up the coast is the head of Gizhigin Bay with Gizhiga Ostrog, the Taygonos Peninsula and the 300-kilometre long Penzhina Bay and the route north to Anadyrsk. The east side of Shelikov Bay is the Kamchatka Peninsula. From the head of Penzhina Bay back to the Uda River is about 2,000 kilometres.

== Geography ==
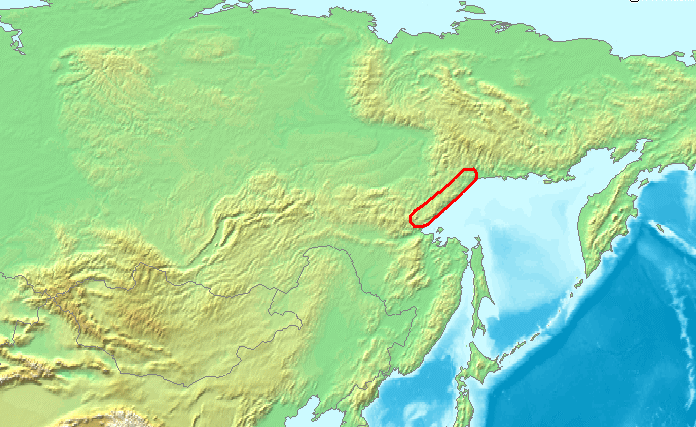
Siberian mountains: Dzhugdzhur Mountains highlighted

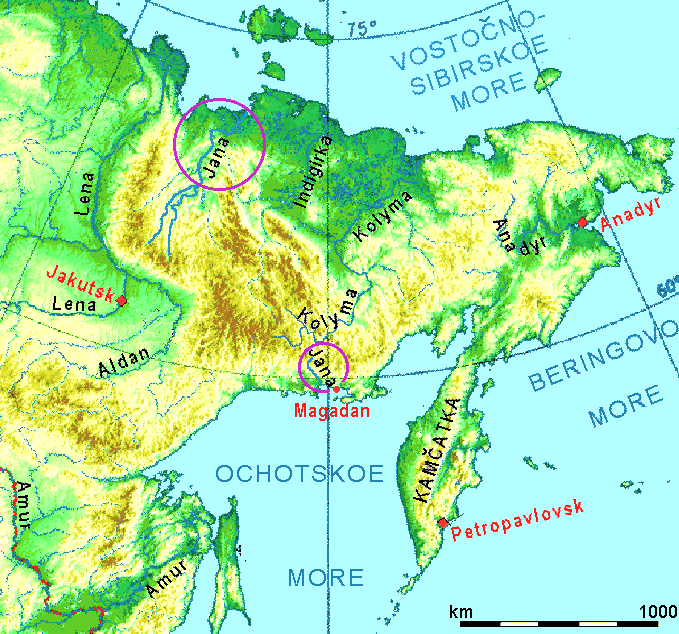
The Maya River is the V-shaped tributary of the Aldan. The Yudoma River flows west north of the "V"

The western section of the continental part of the Sea of Okhotsk Coast is backed by the Dzhugdzhur Mountains which reach 600 to 1,000 metres. They drain westward to branches of the Aldan River and Maya River. Once over the mountains one could travel by boat with few portages all the way to the Ural Mountains. On the east side numerous short, swift rivers cut valleys down to the sea. Their lower floodplains and the negligible coastal strip are the only flat land. The climate is monsoonal. From October to February cold heavy air blows seaward from the interior. From May to July damp air blows landward bringing a cold foggy drizzle. Average temperature is around 10 °C in summer and around zero in winter. Growing season rarely exceeds three months. Only root crops grew well. The few peasants found fishing and trapping more profitable. The high value of sable pelts made it possible to buy imported food. This and the poor soils meant that the Russians had to import food despite the abundance of Salmon.

The natives were Lamuts, a branch of the Tungus who are now called Evens. Like most coastal Siberians, they were reindeer herders in the interior with a few semi-sedentary fishers and sealers along the coast. They had some metallurgy. On both sides of Penzhina Bay were the Koryaks. They were economically similar to the Lamuts, but more warlike. The Lamuts were subdued by the 1690s and the Koryaks much later. In Russian times a number of Yakuts came down to the coast.

== Crossing the mountains ==
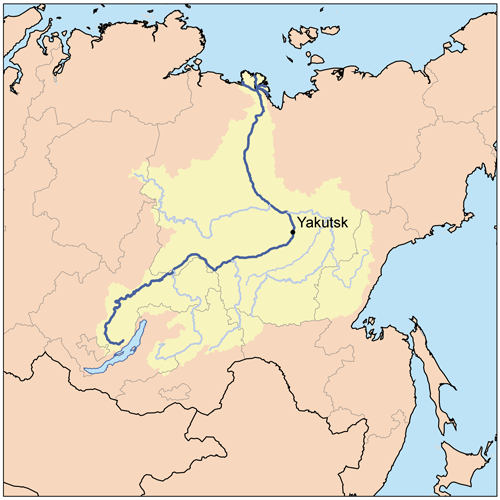
Lena River. Irkutsk is near Lake Baikal

Food passing through Okhotsk was mostly grown near Irkutsk and floated down the Lena River to Yakutsk, carried to Okhotsk and from there most went by ship to Kamchatka. European goods and travelers joined the Lena at the Ust-Kut portage. Lighter west-bound goods -mostly furs- took the reverse route. After 1729 most furs were sold to the Chinese at Kyakhta. In 1805 a pood (34 pounds) of flour cost 0.5 rubles at Irkutsk, 1.5 rubles at Yakutsk, 10 rubles at Okhotsk and 12 rubles at Kamchatka, the difference being the transport cost.

Water route: The route ran from Yakutsk up the Aldan river to the Maya River, transferred to smaller boats, went up the Maya and south up the Mati River, over the Lama portage or Alanchak portage and the down the Ulya River to the coast. By 1700 it was more common to go to the head of the Maya and overland to the head of the Urak River and downstream. A later route went up the Yudoma River, a large west-flowing branch of the Maya, and either over the Yudoma Portage (80–100 kilometres from Yudoma Cross southeast to Urak Landing) and 150–200 kilometres down the Urak River or further up the Yudoma and over the long Okhotsk Portage to the Okhota River. This was surveyed in 1715 by Maksimov and Antipin and was preferred by Bering. The river route was circuitous and mostly upstream. There was a good deal of tracking (see portage) on the upper reaches. After about 1741 it was mostly replaced by the easier horse route.

Yakutsk-Okhotsk Track: By at least 1715 there was a 1,100-kilometre horse track from Yakutsk to Okhotsk. It gradually became the main route until Okhotsk lost its status as the main port in 1844-51. The Yakutsk-Okhotsk Track ran east from Yakutsk, crossed the Aldan River at the Okhotsk Ferry, went southeast up the Belaya River to the settlement and river of Allakh-Tun, east to Captain's Clearing on the Yudoma Plateau, south to Yudoma Cross on the Yudoma River, southeast parallel to the Yudoma Portage to Urak Landing and down the Urak River and along the coast to Okhotsk. The spring shipment left Yakutsk about the first of May to take advantage of the still-frozen bogs and rivers. The summer shipment left Yakutsk in mid-June after the rivers had gone down and the spring mud dried and reached Okhotsk in mid-August. It carried goods that had reached Yakutsk after the thaw but was more difficult and handled less goods. Yakuts and their hardy breed of horses were required to serve the route and were paid. A convoy would have about 100-150 horses divided into strings of about 10 horses tied head-to-tail each led by a Yakut conductor. Each horse carried about 225 pounds. 5,000-10,000 horses were used annually. Around a thousand of these died every year. Cattle were also driven down the track. When Sir George Simpson used the track in 1842 he was amazed by the volume of traffic. Horses returning from Okhotsk carried about half the outbound load because of the lower volume of freight and the lack of pasture at Okhotsk. Returning horses were also cheaper to rent for the same reason. There were ferries on the larger rivers and corduroy roads over the bogs. The numerous fords became impassable during the spring melt and were difficult until the mud dried or refroze. Bogs were especially bad on the flatter western section. The route was littered with horse bones.

Three other routes were used. A winter non-freight route went from Yakutsk east to Omyakon and then directly south to the upper Okhota River. The Yakutsk-Udsk Track is described under Uda River. The Yakutsk-Ayan Track (1844 to 1867) is described under Ayan.

== History ==
Russian arrival: In 1639 Ivan Moskvitin left Brutalsk on the Aldan River, went southeast up the Maya, crossed the mountains and reached the mouth of the Ulya River after 11 weeks. He built winter quarters and next year sent parties south to Uda Bay and north to Taui Bay. In 1646 Vasili Poyarkov sailed north from the Amur and re-used Moskvitin's huts on the Ulya. In 1647 Semyon Selkovnik built winter quarters at Okhotsk and in 1649 a proper ostrog was built there. In 1651-57 Mikhail Stadukhin made a poorly documented journey along the whole coast from Penzhina Bay to Okhotsk. Okhotsk was burned down by the Lamuts in 1653 or 54. They revolted again in 1665 and 1677.

Kamchatka Opened: Russian attention was concentrated on the Amur until they were driven out by the Manchus. Northward, in 1697-1699 Vladimir Atlasov went south from Anadyrsk and explored the Kamchatka Peninsula. There was no sea route but a very difficult coast trail was used mainly to send messages. There were ostrogs at Insk, Tauisk, Yamsk and Gizhiga at the mouths of their corresponding rivers. George Kennan (explorer) gave a hair-raising account of his journey along this coast in 1867. Barthélemy de Lesseps made the same journey in 1788.

Sea-going ships: Although the Cossacks were master boatmen, they did not know how to build large ships and had no knowledge of navigation. Thus they were confined to the coast. In 1714 sailors and shipwrights arrived from European Russia and built the Vostok in 1715. In 1716-17 Kozma Sokolov sailed the Vostok along the coast to Kamchatka. The sea route to Kamchatka soon replaced the land route. Because of the lack of naval infrastructure both ships and sailors were of poor quality. Ships were built from local larch and local substitutes were used for proper naval stores. Frequent fogs and uncharted coasts added to the problem. There was often a shortage of ships. Of the 81 ships built for the Okhotsk flotilla between 1715 and 1856, almost all were wrecked. Adam Johann von Krusenstern (1805) may have been the first Russian to reach the area by sea from European Russia.

Bering: Vitus Bering's two Pacific expeditions (1725–29 and 1733–42) used Okhotsk as a base. This led to a great deal of building and brought in large numbers of people and the first scholars and competent sailors.

Russian expansion to Alaska followed the natural distribution of the Sea Otter

The sea otter boom and Russian America: The remnants of Bering's second expedition returned with more than 1500 sea otter pelts. At Kyakhta prices they were worth one tenth of the expedition's enormous cost. Russian fur-hunters began island-hopping along the Aleutian Islands. The Russian America Company was formed in 1799 with Okhotsk as its Siberian base.

Okhotsk Abandoned: From at least 1719 it was clear that the Okhotsk route needed to be replaced if possible. Okhotsk was a poor port and the route to it the most expensive major route in Siberia. Over the next hundred years many attempts were made to find a better port with a better route over the mountains. Failing that work was done to improve the Yakutsk-Okhotsk track. Nothing came of this until 1840 when Vasily Zavoyko became head of the Russian-America Company post at Okhotsk. He determined to move RAC post south to Ayan. This was done in 1845 and it was found that the route was one third cheaper and eight days shorter. The Yakutsk-Ayan Track was rebuilt in 1852 at a cost of 20,000 rubles. When Nikolay Muravyov-Amursky became the first Siberian governor to use the Okhotsk track he was appalled by its condition and proposed to move the Siberian Flotilla fleet to Petropavlovsk-Kamchatsky. All this became irrelevant with the Amur Annexation in 1860 when everything was moved south. Russian America was sold to the United States in 1867 and from 1870 Okhotsk was supplied from Nikolayevsk-on-Amur. The population of Okhotsk declined from 1,660 in 1839 to 100 in 1865.

Twentieth Century: The last battle of the Russian Civil War was fought at Ayan. In 1929 Magadan was founded and was the headquarters of the Dalstroy Gulag complex. Magadan is now the largest city on the coast. The Kolyma Highway was built from Magadan to Yakutsk. The coast is now divided between Khabarovsk Krai (Tuguro-Chumikansky District, Ayano-Maysky District, Okhotsky District) and Magadan Oblast.

== Sources ==
- James R. Gibson, "Feeding the Russian Fur Trade: Provisionment of the Okhotsk Seaboard and the Kamchatka Peninsula, 1639-1856, 1969
