= Chernovka =

Chernovka Черновка
- Selo
- Location within Amur Oblast Location within Russia
- Coordinates: 51°38′N 128°08′E
- Country: Russia
- Region: Amur Oblast
- District: Svobodnensky District
- Time zone: UTC+9:00

Chernovka (Russian: Черновка) is a rural locality (a selo) and the administrative center of Chernovsky Selsoviet of Svobodnensky District, Amur Oblast, Russia. The population was 633 as of 2018. There are 7 streets.

== Geography ==
Chernovka is located on the right bank of the Bolshaya Pyora River, 33 km north of Svobodny (the district's administrative centre) by road. Chembary is the nearest rural locality.
