= Magadan (icebreaker) =

Russian icebreaker

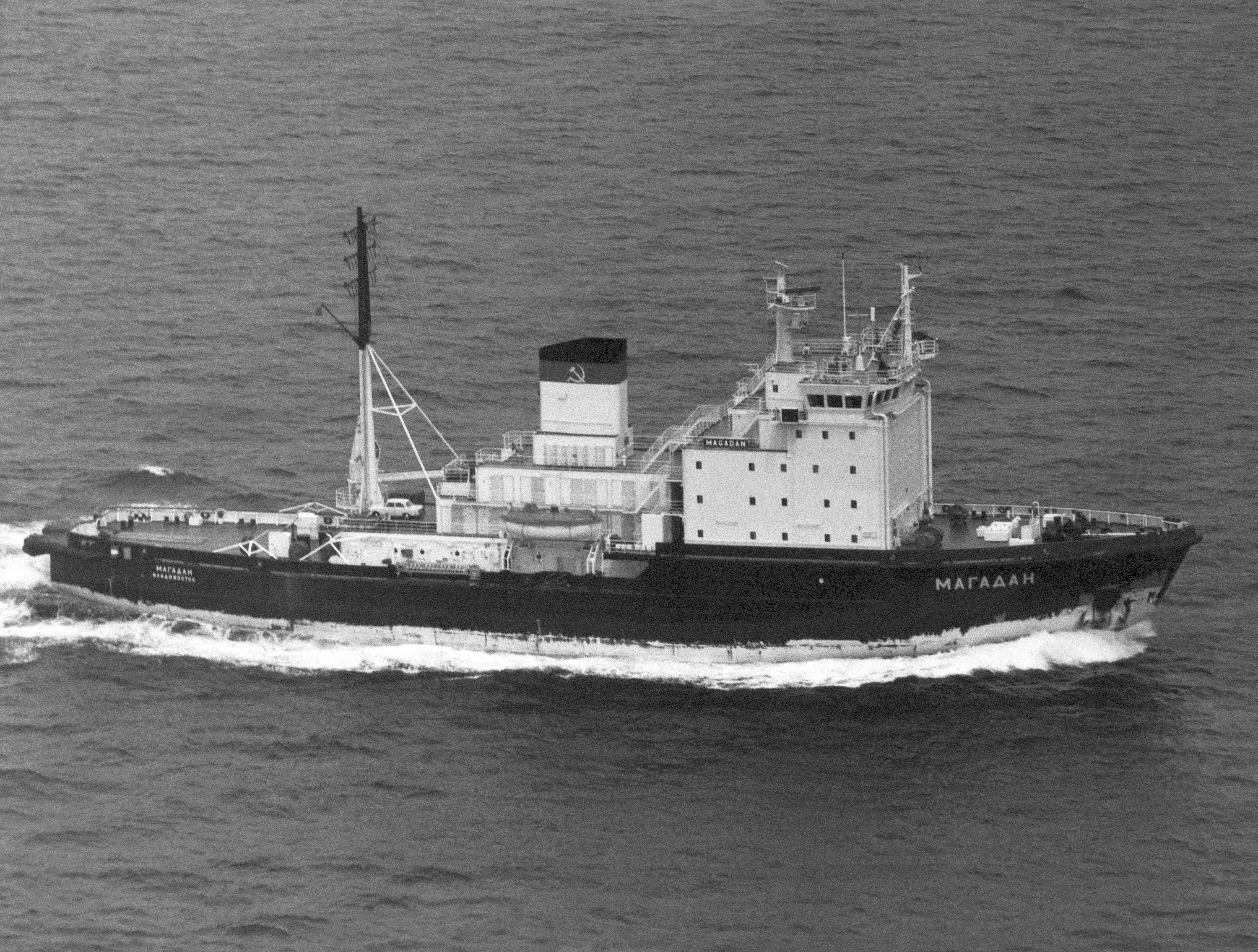

History

Russia
- Name: Magadan (Магадан)
- Namesake: Magadan
- Owner: Far East Shipping Company (1982–2017); Rosmorport (2017–present)
- Port of registry: Vladivostok, Soviet Union (1982–1992); Vladivostok, Russia (1992–present)
- Ordered: April 1980
- Builder: Wärtsilä Helsinki shipyard, Finland
- Cost: FIM 400 million (1980; three ships)
- Yard number: 437
- Laid down: 6 January 1981
- Launched: 16 April 1982
- Completed: 30 December 1982
- In service: 1982–present
- Identification: IMO number: 8009193; MMSI number: 273145900; Call sign: UIFQ
- Status: In service

General characteristics
- Type: Icebreaker
- Tonnage: 5,342 GT; 1,603 NT; 1,909 DWT
- Displacement: 6,210 t (6,110 long tons) (maximum)
- Length: 92.0 m (301.8 ft) (including towing notch); 88.5 m (290.4 ft) (hull); 78.5 m (257.5 ft) (dwl)
- Beam: 21.2 m (69.6 ft) (hull); 20.0 m (65.6 ft) (dwl)
- Draught: 6.5 m (21 ft) (maximum); 6.0 m (20 ft) (dwl)
- Depth: 10.5 m (34 ft)
- Ice class: LL4
- Installed power: 4 × Wärtsilä 8R32 (4 × 2,390 kW)
- Propulsion: Two shafts; controllable pitch propellers
- Speed: 16.5 knots (30.6 km/h; 19.0 mph)

Magadan (Russian: Магадан) is a Russian icebreaker and the second vessel in a series of three subarctic icebreakers built at Wärtsilä Helsinki shipyard in Finland in 1982–1983. The vessel's sister ships are Mudyug (rebuilt in 1986) and Dikson.

== Design ==
Magadan's hull is 88.5 metres (290.4 ft) long overall and has a beam of 21.2 metres (69.6 ft) at its widest point. However, the towing notch increases the extreme length of the vessel to 92.0 metres (301.8 ft) while the inclined sides reduce the hull width to 20.0 metres (65.6 ft) at the design waterline. When loaded to the maximum draught of 6.5 metres (21.3 ft), the icebreaker has a displacement of 6,210 tonnes (6,110 long tons). The vessel's ice class, LL4, is intended for icebreaking operations primarily in ports and coastal areas. The maximum thickness of the shell plating in the bow region is 35 millimetres (1.4 in).

Unlike most icebreakers, Magadan has a diesel-mechanical propulsion system where the vessel's four 2,390-kilowatt (3,210 hp) 8-cylinder Wärtsilä 8R32 medium-speed main engines are coupled in pairs through Lohmann & Stolterfoht Navilus twin-input/single-output single-stage reduction gearboxes to propeller shafts driving 4-metre (13 ft) four-bladed stainless steel KaMeWa controllable pitch propellers. In order to protect the main engines from large torque variations during icebreaking operations and to prevent the propellers from stopping when the blades come in contact with ice, each shaft has a 11.5-tonne (11.3-long-ton; 12.7-short-ton) flywheel to increase rotational inertia of the drivetrain. The vessel's icebreaking capability is further increased by a Wärtsilä Air Bubbling System (WABS) lubricating the hull as well as an active heeling system. Onboard electrical power is generated by three Wärtsilä-Vasa 624TS auxiliary diesel engines with 960 kVA alternators.

Magadan's bollard pull is 914 kilonewtons (93 tf) when operating with a continuous propulsion power of 7,000 kilowatts (9,400 hp). However, for short-term operation the icebreaker can use its maximum shaft output of 9,100 kilowatts (12,200 hp) to generate a bollard pull of 1,400 kilonewtons (140 tf). The vessel has a service speed of 16.5 knots (30.6 km/h; 19.0 mph) in open water and maintain a continuous speed of 2 knots (3.7 km/h; 2.3 mph) when breaking 1 metre (3.3 ft) thick level ice.

== History ==
=== Development and construction ===
In 1977, Wärtsilä began developing a new icebreaker concept in close co-operation with experts from the Soviet Union. Although the Finnish shipbuilder had delivered more icebreaking vessels than any other shipyard in the world, they had all been diesel-electric vessels where diesel generators powered electric propulsion motors driving fixed-pitch propellers. In the new icebreakers, this fairly expensive specialized drivetrain would be replaced with cheaper and more efficient mechanical transmission where the main diesel engines would be connected to controllable pitch propellers through a reduction gearbox. An extensive research program was initiated by Wärtsilä Arctic Design and Marketing (WADAM) to ensure that the new concept was viable and that the problems encountered the recently commissioned United States Coast Guard Polar-class icebreakers would be avoided.

In April 1980, Wärtsilä and the Soviet Union signed a FIM 400 million shipbuilding contract for the construction of three icebreakers to escort ships in the freezing subarctic ports. The vessels, first of which would be delivered in late 1982 and the two following ones in 1983, would be stationed in the Barents Sea, Sea of Okhotsk and Baltic Sea.

Magadan, the second icebreaker of the series, was laid down at Hietalahti shipyard together with the final vessel, Dikson, on 6 January 1981 and launched at the same time with the lead ship, Mudyug, on 16 April 1982. The icebreaker was delivered on 30 December 1982 slightly ahead of schedule.

=== Career ===
Magadan was delivered to the Far East Shipping Company (FESCO) in 1982 and since been operating in the Russian Far East where the icebreaker escorts ships to its namesake city in the Sea of Okhotsk during the winter months. In 2016, Magadan was transferred to Rosmorport and remains in service as of 2023.

==== Notable events ====
Magadan was one of the numerous icebreakers involved in the shipping crisis in the Soviet Eastern Arctic where unprecedented ice conditions caused a major disturbance to shipping at the end of the 1983 navigating season.

In March 1999, Magadan led a rescue effort to escort vessels carrying supplies to isolated Kamchatka settlements that were dangerously short of fuel.

In 2000, Magadan was used to tow decommissioned Russian Navy warships for scrapping in Alang, India.

In August 2003, Magadan participated in a joint Russian-Japanese-Korean rescue exercise in the Sea of Japan. The icebreaker's role in the Vostok-2003 exercise was to act as a target ship that reported a simulated fire onboard the vessel.

In March–April 2006, Magadan was chartered to a joint Russian-American expedition to survey walrus abundance near the Saint Lawrence Island.

On 18 December 2011, Magadan was one of the two vessels towing the jackup rig Kolskaya that capsized and sank in the Sea of Okhotsk with 53 persons declared dead or missing following the accident.
