= Iony Island =

Island belonging to Russia

Coordinates: 56.4097°N 143.3815°E

Iony Island Остров Ионы
- Island
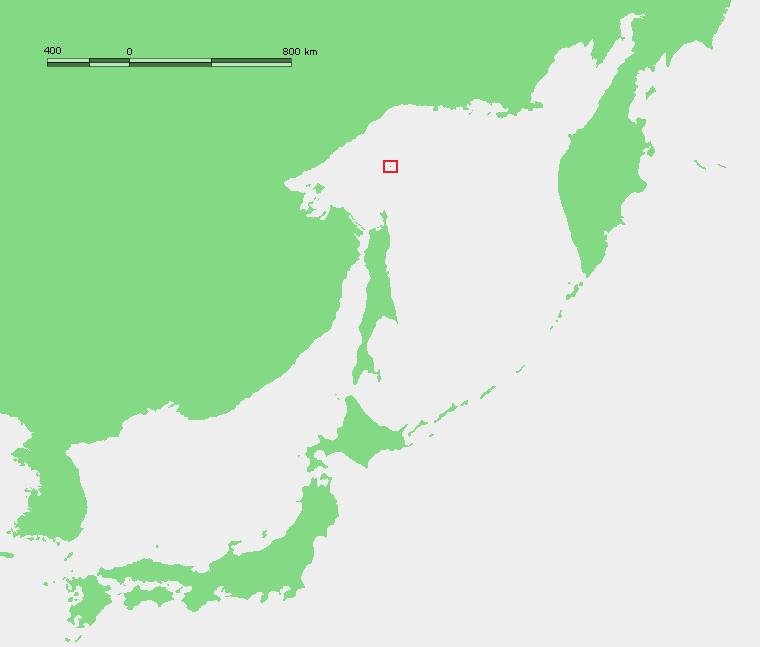
- Location of Ioni Island in the Sea of Okhotsk.
- Interactive map of Iony Island
- Country: Russian Federation
- Federal subject: Khabarovsk Krai
- Elevation: 165 m (541 ft)

Iony Island (Russian: Остров Ионы), or Jonas' Island, formerly Ostrov Svyatogo Iony (Saint Jonas' Island), is a small island in the Sea of Okhotsk. Administratively, Iony belongs to the Khabarovsk Krai of the Russian Federation.

== Geography ==
Iony Island is the only island in the Sea of Okhotsk that is located in the open sea. All other islands in the Okhotsk Sea are either coastal or belong to the Kuril island chain. It is 1.6 km (1 mi) in length, 850 m (2,790 ft) wide, and rises to a height of 165 m (541 ft). The island is barren and conical in shape with sheer cliffs rising to heights of 30–45 m (98–148 ft). Several rocks lie off the island, including a group of four 9–12 m (30–39 ft) high rocks about 800 metres (0.50 mi) to the north-northwest and several detached rocks 160–320 m (520–1,050 ft) to the south.

The island is often enveloped in dense fog due to cold bottom water upwelling to the surface. The flood tidal current off the island sets west, while the ebb sets to the east or east-southeast. These currents may reach up to 1.5 to 2 knots during spring tides and create numerous eddies, small whirlpools, and tide rips around the island for some distance offshore.

== History ==
As early as 1849 whaleships had reached Jonas Island. Between 1852 and 1866 the island's waters were a common hunting ground for ships cruising for bowhead whales — Captain Moses Snell, of the ship Pacific, of Fairhaven, reported seeing as many as forty-five other ships from his masthead just to the south of the island early in June 1855. The fleet would usually reach the area by late May or early June, spending a few weeks cruising for whales before sailing to the south and west, following the retreating ice. Some would go ashore to take advantage of the bounty of seabirds and pinnipeds residing on the island's rocky shores.

On 3 June 1855 the ship Edgar, of Cold Spring, was wrecked on the island during a fog. All hands were saved. The ship then caught or was set on fire. Ships sent boats ashore to salvage what they could of the reported 1,200 to 1,600 bbls of oil that had been aboard the ship, while others picked up whatever they found drifting offshore.

Schooners hunted fur seals on the island between 1889 and 1896. At least 2,250 were caught, with a peak of 879 by four schooners in 1890.

== Fauna ==
The island is a breeding ground for the Steller sea lion. In the spring and summer, a number of seabirds nest on the island, including northern fulmar, several species of auklet (whiskered, least, and crested), horned and tufted puffin, common and thick-billed murre, Leach's and fork-tailed storm petrel, kittiwake, gulls, and cormorants. The island, along with its surrounding waters, has been designated an Important Bird Area (IBA) by BirdLife International because of its significant seabird colonies.

== See also ==
- List of islands of Russia
