= Sea of Okhotsk =

Marginal sea of the Pacific Ocean

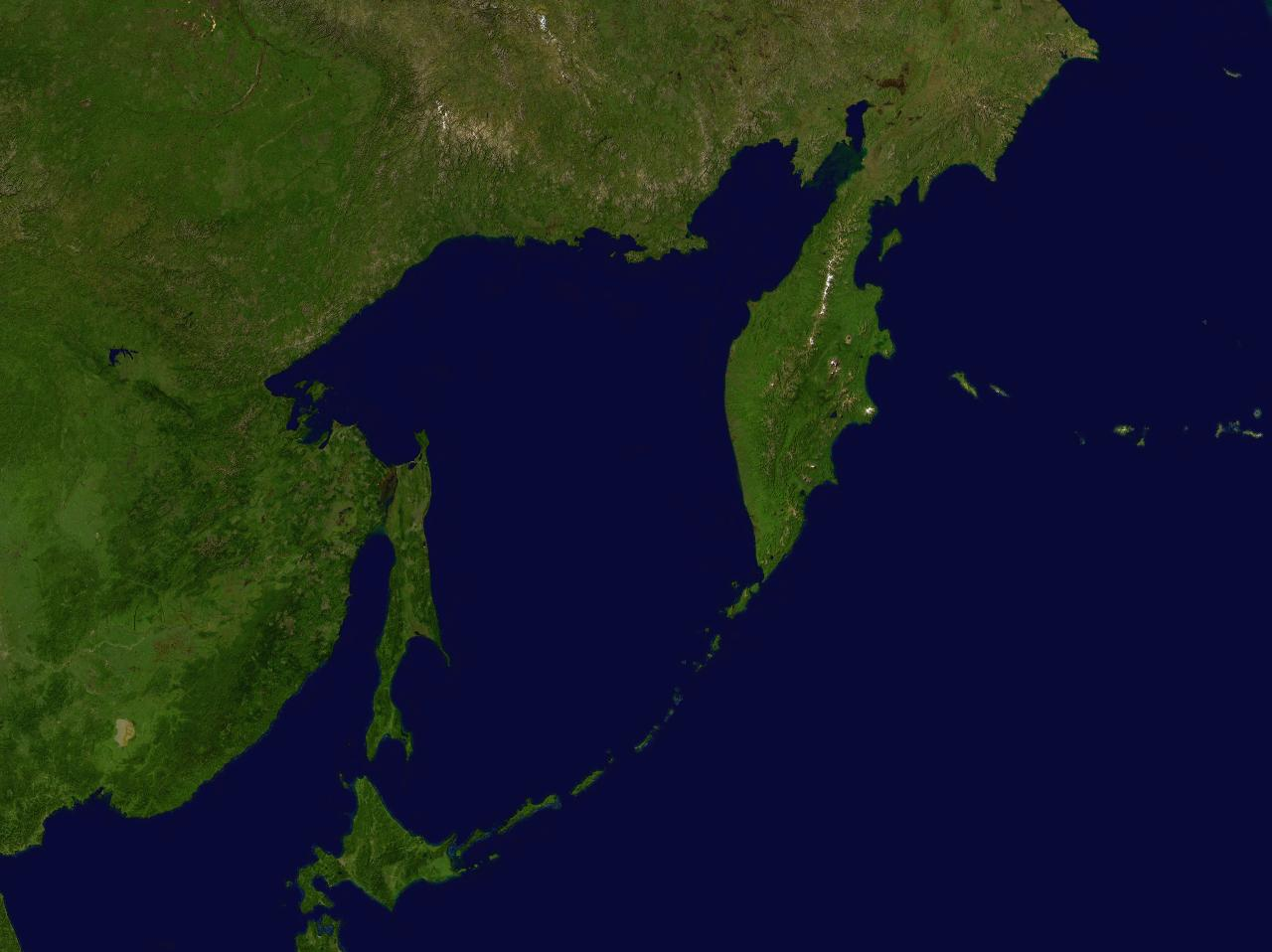
- Sea of Okhotsk
- Interactive map of Sea of Okhotsk
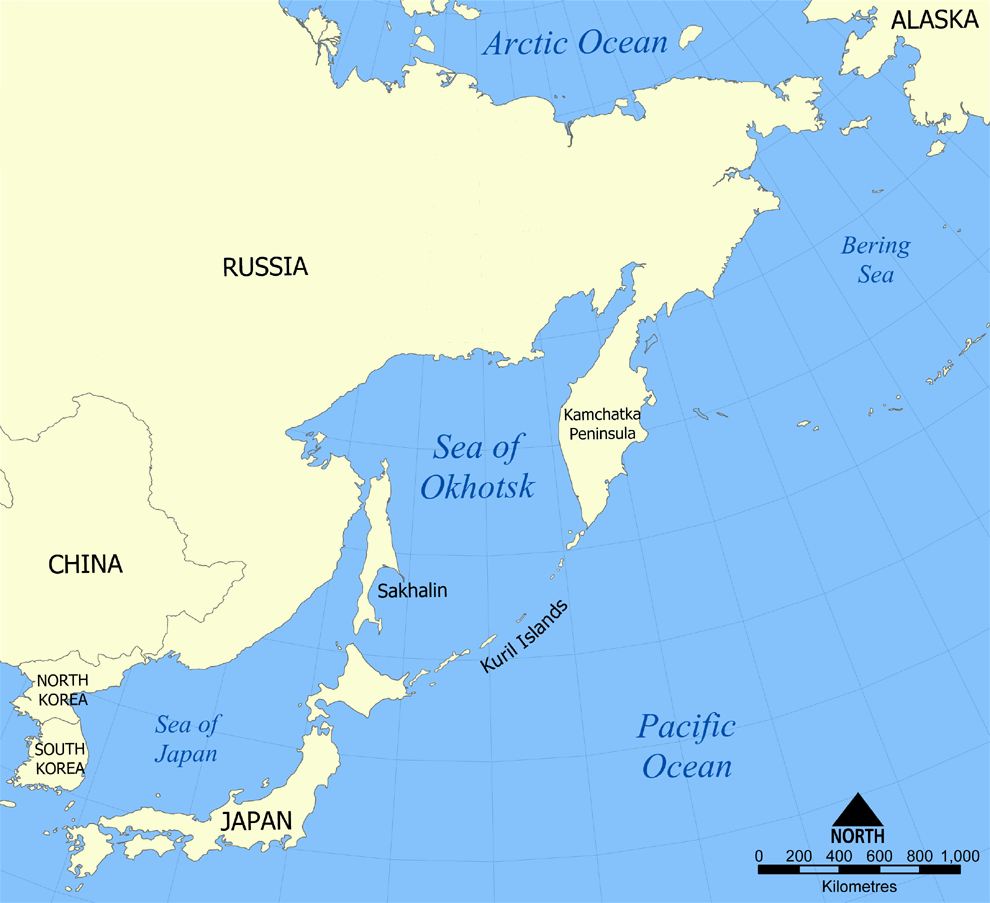
- Map of the Sea of Okhotsk
- Location: North Asia and East Asia
- Coordinates: 55°N 150°E
- Type: Sea
- Basin countries: Japan and Russia
- Surface area: 1,583,000 km^{2} (611,200 sq mi)
- Average depth: 859 m (2,818 ft)
- Max. depth: 3,372 m (11,063 ft)

The Sea of Okhotsk (Note: Russian: Охотское море, romanized: Okhotskoye more, IPA: [ɐˈxotskəjə ˈmorʲe]; Historically also known as Ламутское море, Lamutskoye more, or as Камчатское море, Kamchatskoye more; Japanese: オホーツク海, romanized: Ohōtsuku-kai)) is a marginal sea of the northwestern Pacific Ocean. It is located between Russia's Kamchatka Peninsula on the east, the Kuril Islands on the southeast, Japan's island of Hokkaido on the south, the island of Sakhalin along the west, and a stretch of eastern Siberian coast along the west and north. Its northeast corner is the Shelikhov Gulf. The sea is named for the port of Okhotsk, itself named for the Okhota River.

== Geography ==
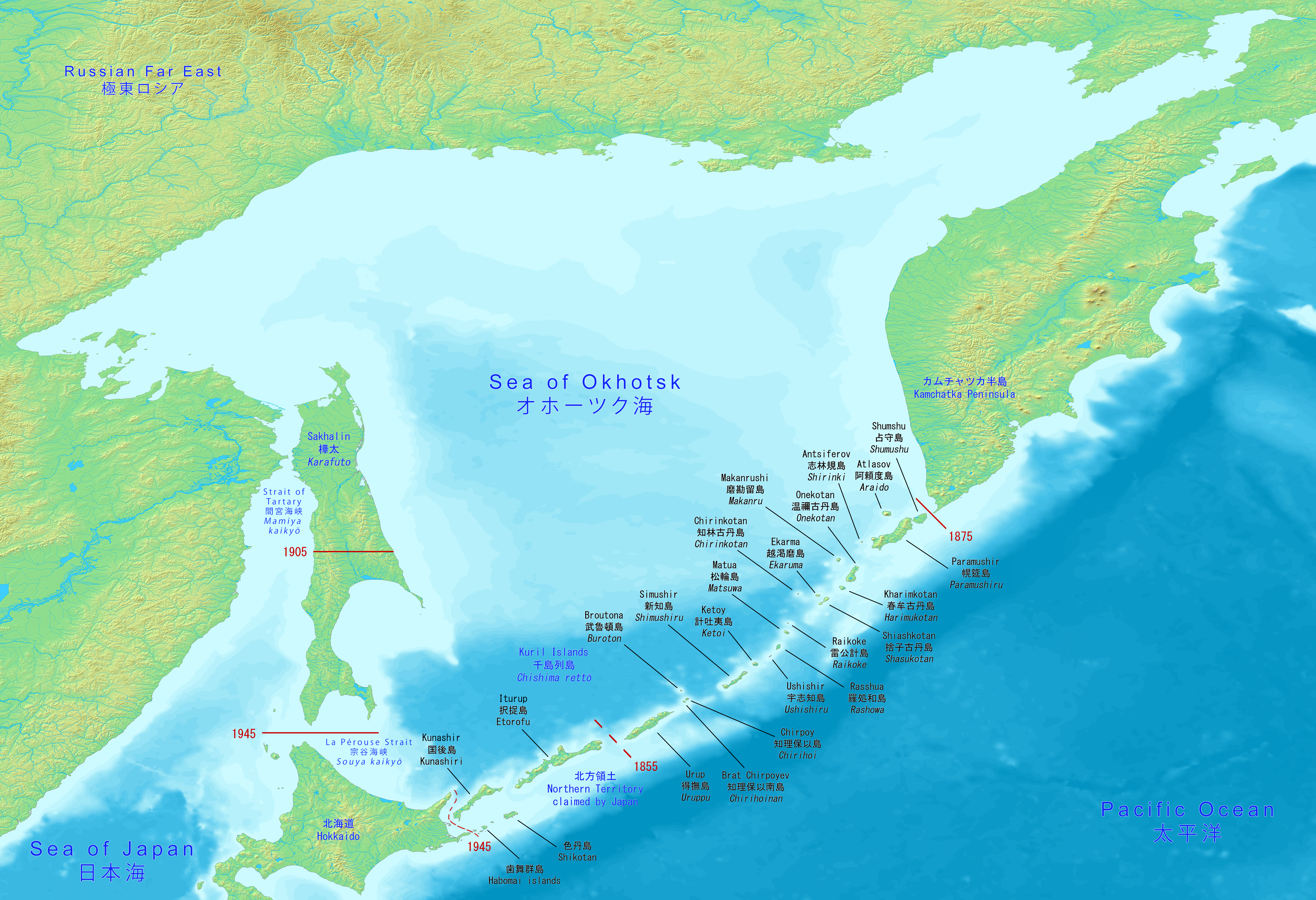
Sea of Okhotsk full map

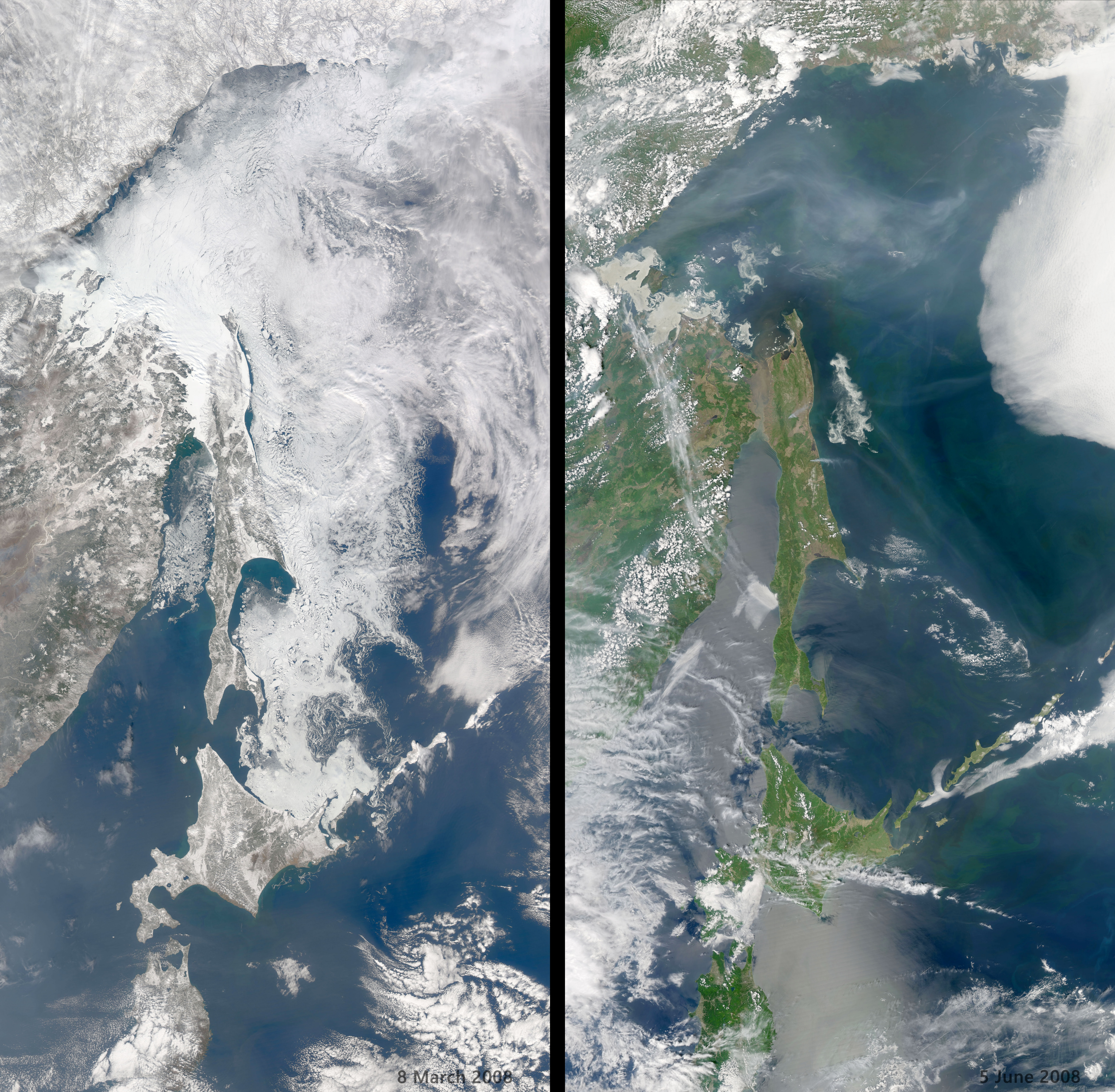
Sea of Okhotsk seasons winter and summer

The Sea of Okhotsk covers an area of 1,583,000 square kilometres (611,000 sq mi), with a mean depth of 859 metres (2,818 ft) and a maximum depth of 3,372 metres (11,063 ft). It is connected to the Sea of Japan on either side of Sakhalin: on the west through the Sakhalin Gulf and the Gulf of Tartary; on the south through the La Pérouse Strait.

In winter, navigation on the Sea of Okhotsk is impeded by ice floes. Ice floes form due to the large amount of freshwater from the Amur River, lowering the salinity of upper levels, often raising the freezing point of the sea surface. The distribution and thickness of ice floes depend on many factors: the location, the time of year, water currents, and the sea temperatures.

Cold air from Siberia forms sea ice in the northwestern Sea of Okhotsk. As the ice forms, it expels salt into the deeper layers. This heavy water flows east toward the Pacific, carrying oxygen and nutrients, supporting abundant sea life. The Sea of Okhotsk has warmed in some places by as much as 3°C (5.4°F) since preindustrial times, three times faster than the global mean. Warming inhibits the formation of sea ice and also drives fish populations north. The salmon catch on the northern Japanese coast has fallen 70% in the last 15 years, while the Russian chum salmon catch has quadrupled.

With the exception of Hokkaido, one of the Japanese home islands, the sea is surrounded on all sides by territory administered by the Russian Federation. South Sakhalin and the Kuril Islands were administered by Japan until 1945. Japan claims the southern Kuril Islands and refers to them as Northern Territories.

Gallery

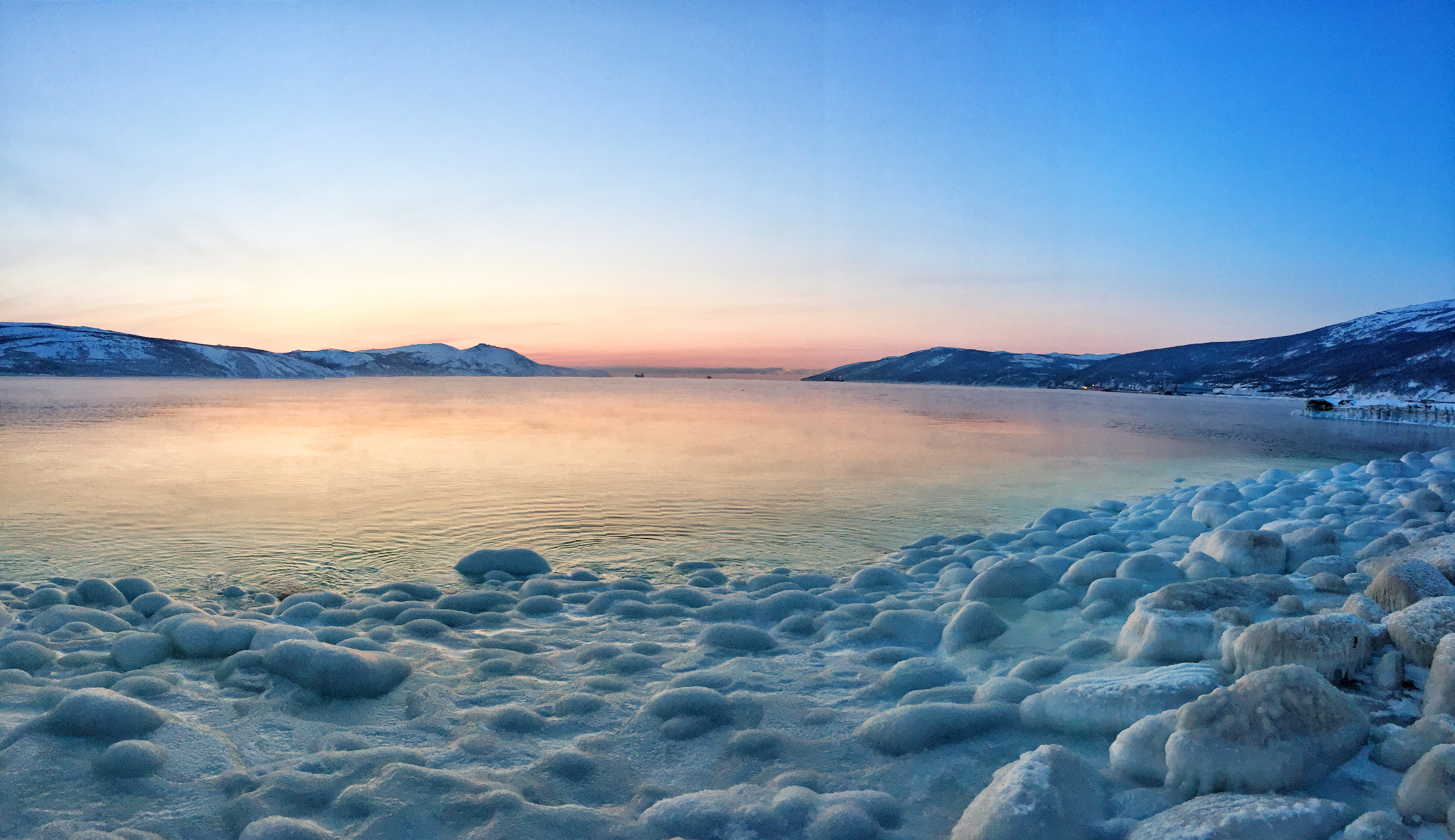
Nagayevo Bay near Magadan, Russia

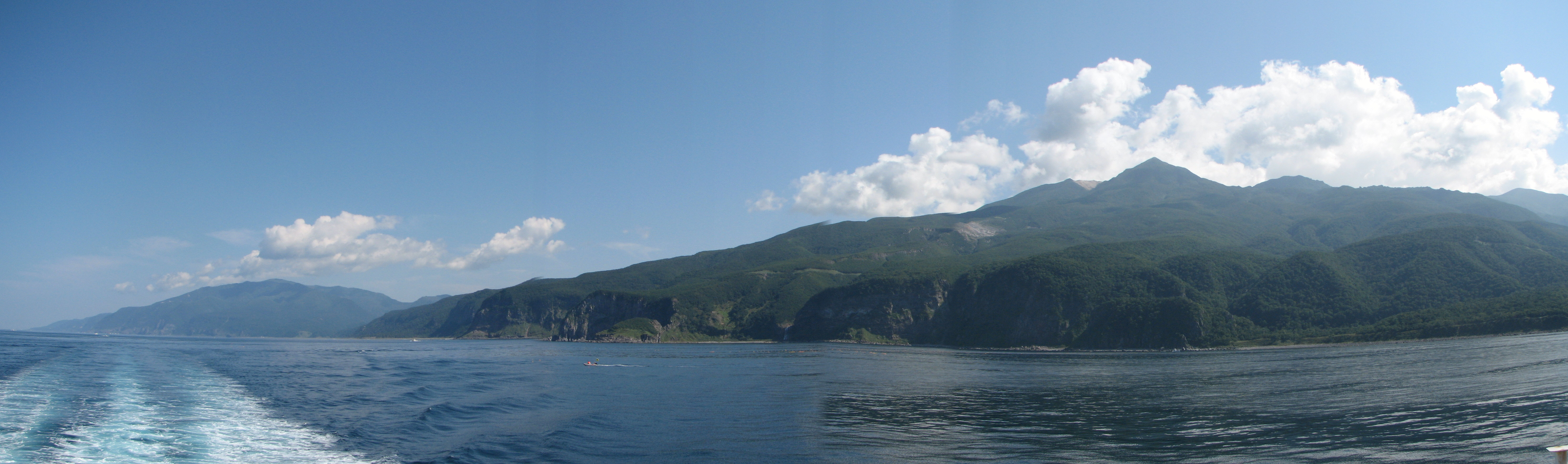
Shiretoko National Park on the Sea of Okhotsk coast of Hokkaido, Japan

=== Extent ===
The International Hydrographic Organization defines the limits of the Sea of Okhotsk as follows:

::On the Southwest. The Northeastern and Northern limits on the Japan Sea [In La Perouse Strait (Sôya Kaikyô). A line joining Sôni Misaki and Nishi Notoro Misaki (45°55'N). From Cape Tuik (51°45'N) to Cape Sushcheva].

::On the Southeast. A line running from Nosyappu Saki (Cape Noshap, 43°23'N) in the Island of Hokusyû (Yezo) through the Kuril or Tisima Islands to Cape Lopatka (South point of Kamchatka) in such a way that all the narrow waters between Hokusyû and Kamchatka are included in the Sea of Okhotsk.

== Climate ==
The Sea of Okhotsk has a subarctic maritime climate and is the coldest sea in East Asia, with winter conditions in its northern and western reaches approaching those of the Arctic. It is the southernmost sea in the Northern Hemisphere that freezes over seasonally. The regional climate is governed largely by the relative positions and intensities of two great atmospheric pressure systems—the Siberian High over the Asian continent and the Aleutian Low over the North Pacific—whose configuration controls the prevailing winter winds and, in turn, the extent of the sea ice. When the Aleutian Low sits southwest of its mean position near the Kamchatka Peninsula, easterly winds and general warming prevail; when it shifts north, cold northerly outbreaks dominate and ice cover is heavier.

The coldest months are January and February and the warmest are July and August. In the northeastern part of the sea the mean February air temperature is about −20 °C (−4 °F), falling lower still over the northern and western coasts, while the south and southeast remain milder under oceanic influence; the mean August air temperature in the northeast is roughly 12 °C (54 °F). From October through April the northern sea is largely ice-covered and receives little precipitation.

=== Water temperatures and salinity ===
The Sea of Okhotsk shows a pronounced seasonal and vertical temperature structure. In winter, surface water across much of the sea falls to near its freezing point, roughly −1.8 to 2 °C (28.8 to 35.6 °F), allowing extensive ice to form. During the warm season the surface layer is heated to a depth of about 30 to 50 metres (98 to 164 ft), and sea surface temperature (SST) rises to roughly 8 to 12 °C (46 to 54 °F) over most of the sea—reported as high as 11 to 13 °C (52 to 55 °F) in some compilations—and to 18 to 19 °C (64 to 66 °F) near Hokkaido and southern Sakhalin, where insolation, vertical mixing and the inflow of warmer Pacific and Japan Sea water combine.

A defining feature of the sea is its cold intermediate, or dicothermal, layer: a residual band of frigid water whose core remains near −2 °C (28 °F) and which can persist through the entire warm season beneath the seasonally warmed surface, producing a sharp temperature gradient between surface and subsurface waters. Deeper water averages about −1.8 to −1 °C (28.8 to 30.2 °F). Surface salinity is comparatively low—around 32.5 parts per thousand or less, diluted by the discharge of the Amur River and other rivers—while deeper water reaches roughly 34 parts per thousand. The intermediate layer of the sea has warmed over recent decades, accompanied by a decline in its dissolved oxygen that points to a reduction in the formation of the cold intermediate layer.

=== Sea ice ===
Sea ice typically forms from cold Siberian air over the northwestern shelf, where the lowered surface salinity from river runoff raises the freezing point and favors freezing. In a typical winter roughly 50 to 70 percent of the sea's surface becomes ice-covered, with ice present from about December until early summer. As ice forms it expels salt into the underlying water through brine rejection, creating dense, oxygen-rich Dense Shelf Water that sinks and flows toward the Pacific; this process ventilates the North Pacific Intermediate Water and carries oxygen and nutrients into the wider ocean. Long-term observations show a marked reduction in winter ice extent since the late 1980s, associated with a weakening of the regional pressure gradient, and modelling links the resulting larger open-water fetch to increasing wave power over the sea in winter.

=== Currents and circulation ===
The overall circulation of the Sea of Okhotsk is cyclonic (counter-clockwise), driven by the prevailing cyclonic atmospheric circulation and wind-stress curl over the region. Within this broad pattern, oceanographers distinguish about twelve boundary currents, of which three are dominant: the West Kamchatka Current, the East Sakhalin Current, and the Soya Current.

The warm West Kamchatka Current dominates the northeastern part of the sea and is a continuation of the East Kamchatka Current, itself part of the Western Subarctic Gyre, entering chiefly through the northern Kuril straits. The cold East Sakhalin Current forms the western boundary current of the cyclonic gyre, transporting low-salinity surface water laden with Amur River discharge—and the iron it carries—southward along the eastern shelf of Sakhalin; it comprises a near-shore branch reaching as far as Hokkaido and an over-slope branch, and is strongest in late autumn and winter. The warm, saline Soya Warm Current enters from the Sea of Japan through La Pérouse Strait and flows along the northern coast of Hokkaido; it is a branch of the Tsushima Current (and ultimately the Kuroshio) and is strongest in summer, when it largely governs the temperature regime of the southern sea.

While the central and northern sea is cyclonic, the deep Kuril Basin in the south is characterized by an anticyclonic circulation populated by numerous mesoscale eddies, where the cold, fresh East Sakhalin Current water and the warm, saline Soya Current water mix to form Okhotsk Sea Intermediate Water. Numerical modelling indicates that the currents intensify in winter and weaken in summer, and that the sea cycles through four seasonal circulation regimes. Tidal ranges vary greatly around the basin, from a maximum of about 12.9 metres (42 ft) in Penzhina Bay to as little as 0.8 metres (2.6 ft) off southeastern Sakhalin.

== Islands ==
Some of the Sea of Okhotsk's islands are quite large, including Japan's second-largest island, Hokkaido, as well as Russia's largest island, Sakhalin. Practically all of the sea's islands are either in coastal waters (such as the Shantar Islands) or belong to the various islands making up the Kuril Islands chain. These fall either under undisputed Japanese or Russian ownership or disputed ownership between Japan and Russia. Iony Island is the only island located in open waters and belongs to the Khabarovsk Krai of the Russian Federation.

The majority of the sea's islands are uninhabited, making them ideal breeding grounds for seals, sea lions, seabirds, and other sea island fauna. Large colonies of crested auklets use the Sea of Okhotsk as a nesting site.

== History ==
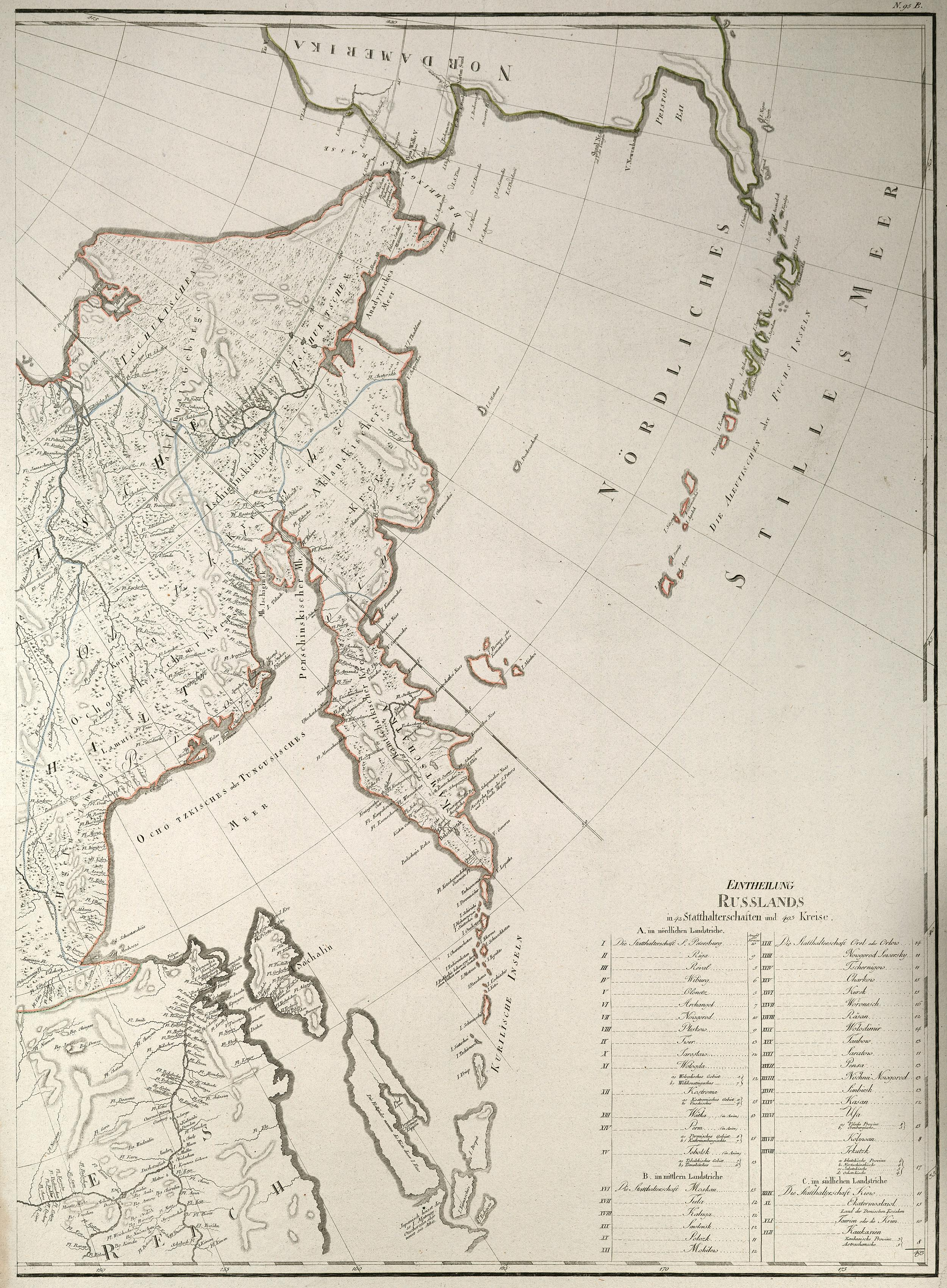
Most of the Sea of Okhotsk, labelled here as the Ocho Tzkisches Meer or Tungusisches Meer ("Tungusic Sea"), had been well mapped by 1792, apart from Sakhalin.

=== Pre-modern ===
The Okhotsk culture and the later Ainu people, a coastal fishing and hunter-gatherer people, were located around the lands surrounding the Sea of Okhotsk, as well as in northern Japan.

=== European exploration and settlement ===
Russian explorers Vassili Poyarkov (1639) and Ivan Moskvitin (1645) were the first Europeans to visit the Sea of Okhotsk, and probably the island of Sakhalin in the 1640s. The Dutch captain Maarten Gerritsz Vries in the Breskens entered the Sea of Okhotsk from the south-east in 1643, and charted parts of the Sakhalin coast and Kuril Islands, but failed to realize that either Sakhalin or Hokkaido are islands. During this period, the sea was sometimes known as the Sea of Kamchatka.

The first and foremost Russian settlement on the shore was the port of Okhotsk, which relinquished commercial supremacy to Ayan in the 1840s. The Russian-American Company all but monopolized the commercial navigation of the sea in the first half of the 19th century.

The Second Kamchatka Expedition under Vitus Bering systematically mapped the entire coast of the sea, starting in 1733. Jean-François de Galaup, comte de Lapérouse and William Robert Broughton were the first non-Russian European navigators known to have passed through these waters other than Vries. Ivan Krusenstern explored the eastern coast of Sakhalin in 1805. Mamiya Rinzō and Gennady Nevelskoy determined that Sakhalin was indeed an island separated from the mainland by a narrow strait. The first detailed summary of the hydrology of the Sea of Okhotsk was prepared and published by Stepan Makarov in 1894.

==== The Peanut Hole ====
The Peanut Hole (named for its shape) is an area of open ocean at the center of the Sea of Okhotsk, about 55 km (30 mi) wide and 480 km (300 mi) long, surrounded by Russia's exclusive economic zone (EEZ). Since the Peanut Hole is not in the Russian EEZ, any country could fish there, and some began doing so in large numbers in 1991, catching perhaps as much as one million metric tons of pollock in 1992. This was seen by the Russian Federation as presenting a danger to Russian fish stocks, since the fish move in and out of the Peanut Hole from the Russian EEZ.

The Russian Federation petitioned the United Nations to declare the Peanut Hole to be part of Russia's continental shelf. In November 2013, a United Nations subcommittee accepted the Russian argument, and in March 2014 the full United Nations Commission on the Limits of the Continental Shelf ruled in favor of the Russian Federation.

=== Whaling ===
Bowhead whales were first caught in 1847, and dominated the catch between 1852 and the late 1860s. Between 1850 and 1853 the majority of the fleet went to the Bering Strait region to hunt bowheads, but intense competition, poor ice conditions, and declining catches forced the fleet back to the Sea of Okhotsk. From 1854 to 1856, an average of over 160 vessels cruised in the sea each year. As catches declined between 1858 and 1860 the fleet shifted back to the Bering Strait region.

The Russian military marine mammal program reportedly sources some of its animals from the Sea of Okhotsk.

=== Modern ===
South Sakhalin was administered by Japan as Karafuto Prefecture from 1907 to 1949. The Kuril Islands were Japanese from 1855 and 1875 till the end of World War II in 1945. Afterward, the Soviet Union occupied the territory.

During the Cold War, the Sea of Okhotsk was the scene of several successful U.S. Navy operations (including Operation Ivy Bells) to tap Soviet Navy undersea communications cables. These operations were documented in the 1998 book Blind Man's Bluff: The Untold Story of American Submarine Espionage. The sea (and surrounding area) were also the scene of the Soviet attack on Korean Air Lines Flight 007 in 1983. The Soviet Pacific Fleet used the sea as a ballistic missile submarine bastion, a strategy that Russia continues.

Despite its proximity to Japan, the Sea of Okhotsk has no native etymology in the Japanese language; its name, Ohōtsuku-kai (オホーツク海), is a transcription of the Russian name. This is also reflected in the name of Hokkaido's Okhotsk Subprefecture, which faces the Sea of Okhotsk and is also known as the Okhotsk region (オホーツク地方, Ohōtsuku-chihō).

== Marine life and fisheries ==
The Sea of Okhotsk is among the most biologically productive seas in the world and supports rich fishery resources, including walleye pollock, herring, flounder, salmon, squid and crabs. The harsh conditions of crab fishing in the Sea of Okhotsk are the subject of the most famous novel of the Japanese writer Takiji Kobayashi, The Crab Cannery Ship (1929).

=== Productivity ===
The sea's exceptional productivity arises from the combination of large river drainage, vigorous mixing of waters by straits and wind, and the upwelling of deep, nutrient-laden water. The Amur River supplies nutrients, notably iron, which in this otherwise iron-limited subarctic sea is critical to phytoplankton growth; the iron is carried south by the East Sakhalin Current and is also redistributed into intermediate waters through brine-driven convection during ice formation, ultimately fertilizing the western subarctic North Pacific as well. A large phytoplankton bloom develops each spring after the sea ice melts and retreats, with the highest chlorophyll concentrations near the Amur estuary and off northeastern Sakhalin; the bloom generally subsides by July as the surface stratifies and nutrients are depleted, followed by a secondary bloom in October as cooling and wind-mixing renew the surface supply. The biomass of fish and squid in the sea's epipelagic zone has been estimated at about 17.2 million tonnes—dominated by walleye pollock, Pacific herring, capelin and pink salmon—with a further 15.0 million tonnes in the mesopelagic zone.

=== Fish ===
On the order of 300 fish species inhabit the sea, of which roughly 40 are commercially exploited. By far the most important is the walleye (Alaska) pollock (Gadus chalcogrammus), whose principal spawning grounds lie on the West Kamchatka shelf. Other commercially significant fishes include Pacific herring (Clupea pallasii), Pacific cod (Gadus macrocephalus), saffron cod, capelin, smelts, flatfishes and halibut, greenlings (including the arabesque greenling) and rockfishes. All Pacific salmon species occur in the sea, including pink, chum, sockeye, coho, Chinook and masu salmon, with pink salmon the most abundant; salmon are taken mainly inshore, and Russian Far Eastern landings have averaged on the order of 200,000 tonnes per year.

=== Crabs, squid and other invertebrates ===
The seafloor and shelf support large and commercially valuable crustaceans, foremost the red king crab (Paralithodes camtschaticus); the Sea of Okhotsk population is the most abundant of all red king crab populations worldwide, concentrated on the western Kamchatka shelf, where the crabs winter at depths greater than 100 m and spawn in shallow water in May and June. Blue king crab, golden king crab and snow (queen) crab (Chionoecetes opilio) are also harvested, the last from a stock in the northern Sea of Okhotsk regarded as healthy. Cephalopods are commercially important as well—principally squid, of which Berryteuthis magister is the dominant species, along with octopus—and the fauna further includes shrimp, scallops, sea urchins and sea cucumbers.

=== Marine mammals ===
The Sea of Okhotsk supports populations of some 22 species of marine mammals. Ice-associated pinnipeds are prominent, including the Okhotsk ringed seal, ribbon seal, spotted seal and bearded seal, together with the Steller sea lion, northern fur seal and sea otter; the ice-breeding seals were the subject of a substantial commercial harvest through the late 20th century. Cetaceans recorded in the sea include the gray whale—whose endangered western population uses the shelf off northeastern Sakhalin as its main feeding ground—as well as bowhead, North Pacific right, beluga, minke, fin, humpback and sperm whales, and Dall's porpoise. Killer whales (Orcinus orca) occur as both a fish-eating "resident" ecotype and a mammal-hunting "Bigg's" (transient) ecotype, the latter preying on Steller sea lions and northern fur seals. Historically, unregulated hunting of the sea otter, northern fur seal and right and bowhead whales repeatedly depleted these populations before harvest restrictions were introduced.

=== Catches ===
Pollock is Russia's single most important fishing resource, accounting for roughly 40 percent of the national catch, and the Sea of Okhotsk is its main source. The pollock fishery, certified to the Marine Stewardship Council standard in 2013 and prosecuted mainly with midwater trawls, has yielded on the order of 840,000 tonnes per year. Russian fishers take the quota over two seasons—Season A, running roughly from 1 January to early April, accounts for about 80 percent of the annual catch, and Season B begins in mid-October. The total allowable catch in the Sea of Okhotsk was set at 951,500 tonnes for 2024, and Russia reported around 858,000 tonnes taken across both seasons in 2023; in the A season of 2024, vessels landed roughly 830,000 tonnes in the Sea of Okhotsk, helping push the wider Russian Far East pollock catch above one million tonnes. The West Kamchatka red king crab fishery, reopened in 2013, has yielded between roughly 5,000 and 15,000 tonnes annually, holding near 15,300 tonnes in 2018–2019 before easing to about 14,000 tonnes in 2024.

== Oil and gas exploration ==
Twenty-nine zones of possible oil and gas accumulation have been identified on the Sea of Okhotsk shelf, which runs along the coast. Total reserves are estimated at 3.5 billion tons of equivalent fuel, including 1.2 billion tons of oil and 1.5 billion cubic meters of gas.

On 18 December 2011, the Russian oil drilling rig Kolskaya capsized and sank in a storm in the Sea of Okhotsk, some 124 km (77 mi) from Sakhalin island, where it was being towed from Kamchatka. Reportedly, its pumps failed, causing it to take on water and sink. The platform carried 67 people, of which 14 were rescued by the Magadan and the tugboat Natftogaz-55. The platform was subcontracted to a company working for the Russian energy giant Gazprom.

== Notable seaports ==
- Magadan, Magadan, Russia; population: 95,000
- Palana, Kamchatka, Russia; population: 3,000
- Abashiri, Hokkaido, Japan; population: 38,000
- Monbetsu, Hokkaido, Japan; population: 25,000
- Wakkanai, Hokkaido, Japan; population: 38,000

== See also ==
- 100 Soundscapes of Japan
- History of fur trade by Sea of Okhotsk
