= Severnyy Strait =

Strait in the Sea of Okhotsk

Coordinates: 55°00′N 137°15′E

Severnyy Strait (Russian: Severnyy Proliv or "Northern Strait") is a strait in the western Sea of Okhotsk. It separates two of the Shantar Islands: Feklistova Island to the west and Bolshoy Shantar Island to the east.

== History ==
American whaleships targeting bowhead whales visited Severnyy Strait from the 1850s to the 1880s. They called it Feklistoff or Big Shantar Passage. Ships sailed through the strait on their way to and from Lebyazhya Bay or on their way to Tugur Bay. Ships also anchored in the strait and ships and boats cruised for whales in it as well.
