= Ptichy Island =

Ptichy Island is the name of several islands in the Russian Far East:

- Ptichy Island (Kamchatka Krai), an island in the eastern Sea of Okhotsk, off western Kamchatka
- Ptichy Island (Shantar Islands), an island in the western Sea of Okhotsk
