= Sakharnaya Golova Island =

Sakharnaya Golova Остров Сахарная Голова
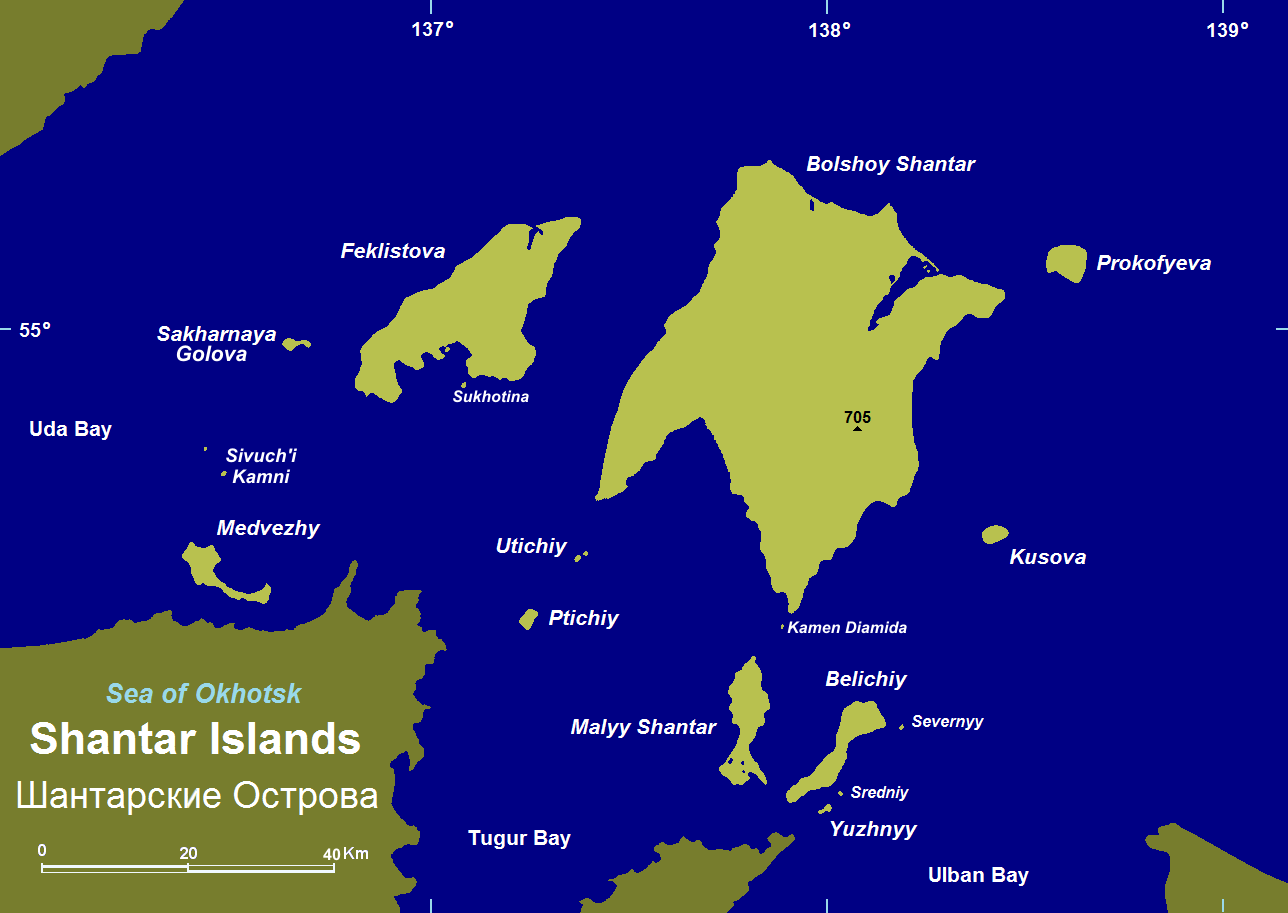
- The Shantar Islands in the Sea of Okhotsk

- Location within Khabarovsk Krai

Geography
- Location: Sea of Okhotsk
- Coordinates: 54°57′N 136°32′E
- Archipelago: Shantar Islands
- Highest elevation: 171 m (561 ft)

Administration
- Russia
- Federal Subject: Khabarovsk Krai

Demographics
- Population: 0

Sakharnaya Golova (Russian: Острова Сивучьи Камни, Ostrov Sakharnaya Golova, meaning "Sugarloaf Island") is a small island in the northwestern Sea of Okhotsk. It is part of the Shantar Islands National Park.

== Geography ==
Sakharnaya Golova is one of the Shantar Islands. It has an elevation of 171 m and lies to the west of Feklistova Island.

== History ==
The island was frequented by American whaleships hunting bowhead whales between 1857 and 1889.
