= List of shipwrecks in October 1876 =

The list of shipwrecks in October 1876 includes ships sunk, foundered, grounded, or otherwise lost during October 1876.

== 1 October ==
List of shipwrecks: 1 October 1876
Ship	State	Description
Antonio	Italy	The barque foundered in the Atlantic Ocean off the coast of Finistère, France. Her crew were rescued on 4 October by Lissabon (Germany). Antonio was on a voyage from Cardiff, Glamorgan, United Kingdom to Brindisi.
Aufraddy	United Kingdom	The barque sprang a leak and was beached at Hartlepool, County Durham, where she became a wreck. Six of her nine crew took to the longboat, the others were rescued by a lifeboat. She was on a voyage from London to Sunderland, County Durham.
Chilian	United Kingdom	The ship ran aground on Owens Flat. She was on a voyage from Sunderland to London.
Gustav Fretwurst	Germany	The brig ran aground on the Longsand, in the North Sea off the coast of Essex, United Kingdom and was abandoned by her crew, who were rescued by the schooner Harry (United Kingdom). Gustav Fretwurst was on a voyage from Ljusne, Sweden to Marseille, Bouches-du-Rhône, France. She was refloated on 3 October and towed in to Harwich, Essex in a waterlogged condition.
Peter	Denmark	The brig ran aground off Sizewell, Suffolk, United Kingdom with the loss of her captain. Seven crew were rescued. She was on a voyage from Memel, Germany to London.
R. B. Muthall	United States	The barque ran aground on the Ledges, off Lockport, New York and was wrecked. Her crew were rescued. She was on a voyage from Cárdenas, Cuba to New York City.
Unnamed	Germany	The brig ran aground on the Longsand, in the North Sea off the coast of Essex, United Kingdom and was wrecked with the loss of all hands.
Unnamed	United Kingdom	The ferry capsized in the Blackwater River at Youghal, County Cork with much loss of life. There were six confirmed survivors of the 22 people on board, with eleven missing.

== 2 October ==
List of shipwrecks: 2 October 1876
Ship	State	Description
De Twee Gebroeders	Belgium	The lighter was run down and sunk by the steamship Alster (United Kingdom) at Antwerp with the loss of a crew member.
Emma	Germany	The schooner foundered off Hela with the loss of all but two of her crew. She was on a voyage from Stralsund to Stockton-on-Tees, County Durham, United Kingdom.
J. L. Hale	United States	The ship foundered in the English Channel off the coast of Dorset, United Kingdom.
Joseph F. Allen	United States	The schooner sailed from Gloucester, Massachusetts for the Western Banks. No further trace, presumed lost with all ten crew. Possibly lost in the gale of 16 October.
St. George	United Kingdom	The schooner was driven ashore and wrecked at Bayonne, Loire-Inférieure, France. Her crew were rescued. She was on a voyage from Falmouth, Cornwall to Bayonne.
Unnamed	Flag unknown	The schooner foundered off the coast of Cornwall, United Kingdom with the loss of all hands.
Unnamed	United Kingdom	The smack was run into by a barque and sank at Hull, Yorkshire. Her crew were rescued by a tug.

== 3 October ==
List of shipwrecks: 3 October 1876
Ship	State	Description
Hallyards	United Kingdom	The brig was driven ashore at Port Kunda, Russia. Her crew were rescued.
Heimdal	Sweden	The steamship ran aground and sank at Vaxholm. She was on a voyage from Grimsby, Lincolnshire, United Kingdom to Stockholm.
Marianne	France	The ship sprang a leak and foundered in the Atlantic Ocean. Her crew survived. She was on a voyage from Cardiff, Glamorgan, United Kingdom to Bordeaux, Gironde.
Vincedora	United Kingdom	The barque caught fire and was abandoned in the South Atlantic. Her crew were rescued by Eastern Light ( Canada. Vincedora was on a voyage from Porthcawl, Glamorgan to Valparaíso, Chile.
Volonte de Dieu	France	The cutter struck a bridge and sank in the Seine at Charenton-le-Pont, Val-de-Marne. All ten people on board survived.

== 4 October ==
List of shipwrecks: 4 October 1876
Ship	State	Description
Annie Bell	United Kingdom	The schooner caught fire in the Atlantic Ocean and sank. Her five crew were rescued by Thorndean (United Kingdom). Annie Bell was on a voyage from Quebec City, Canada to Liverpool, Lancashire.
Dussumier	France	The barque collided with the aviso Phoque (French Navy) at Pauillac, Gironde and was severely damaged. Dussumier was on a voyage from Bordeaux, Gironde to Guadeloupe.
Ellen Goudey	Canada	The ship was wrecked off Elizabeth Island, in the Society Islands. All nineteen people on board survived. She was on a voyage from San Francisco, California, United States to Antwerp, Belgium.
Flore	France	The schooner was driven ashore at Gravelines, Nord.
John S. Harris	United Kingdom	The barque was driven ashore at Schuylkill, Pennsylvania, United States. She was on a voyage from Philadelphia, Pennsylvania to Hamburg, Germany. She was refloated and put back to Philadelphia in a leaky condition.
Surprise	France	The schooner struck a rock and sank off the Île de Batz, Finistère. Her crew survived. She was on a voyage from Port-Launay, Morbihan to an English port.
Troubadour	United Kingdom	The barque was driven ashore at Annalong, County Down. Her crew were rescued by the Coastguard. She was on a voyage from Liverpool to the Bay of Islands, Newfoundland Colony.
Unnamed	Belgium	The barge was in collision with Dolphin (United Kingdom) and sank at Antwerp.

== 5 October ==
List of shipwrecks: 5 October 1876
Ship	State	Description
Agil	(Canada)	The barquentine was wrecked on Green Holm, off Eday, Orkney Islands, United Kingdom. Her eight crew survived. She was on a voyage from Copenhagen, Denmark to Charlottetown, Prince Edward Island. Barratry was suspected to be involved, as several holes had been bore in her hull from the inside
Emma	United Kingdom	The smack foundered in the Bristol Channel off Lundy Island, Devon. Her three crew were rescued by Ironside (United Kingdom).
Fiery Cross	United Kingdom	The fishing smack ran aground and sank at Sunderland, County Durham.
Hebe	Norway	The brig ran aground on the West Rocks, in the North Sea off the coast of Essex, United Kingdom. She was on a voyage from "Kuni", Grand Duchy of Finland to Bordeaux, Gironde, France. She was refloated and assisted in to Harwich, Essex in a waterlogged condition by a tug and a smack.
Maid of Meirron	United Kingdom	The schooner ran aground on the Brake Sand. She was on a voyage from London to Barrow-in-Furness, Lancashire. She was refloated and resumed her voyage.
Marianna	France	The brig sprang a leak and foundered off the Glénan Islands. Her crew survived. She was on a voyage from Bordeaux to Cardiff, Glamorgan, United Kingdom.
Miavullis	Greece	The ship ran aground at Bandırma, Ottoman Empire. She was on a voyage from Bandırma to Marseille, Bouches-du-Rhône, France.
Yuca	Sweden	The brig was driven ashore at Newbiggin-by-the-Sea, Northumberland, United Kingdom. She was on a voyage from Gothenburg to the River Tyne. She was refloated with assistance from the tug Admiral (United Kingdom) and taken in to the River Tyne.

== 6 October ==
List of shipwrecks: 6 October 1876
Ship	State	Description
Alert	France	The sloop was driven ashore and wrecked near Surtainville, Manche. Her crew were rescued.
Eliza McNeil	United States	The ship ran aground at New York. She was on a voyage from New York to San Francisco, California. She was refloated and resumed her voyage.
Ferdinand	Germany	The barque ran aground off Sanday, Orkney Islands, United Kingdom. She was on a voyage from Danzig to Limerick, United Kingdom.
Lady Mary	United Kingdom	The schooner was driven ashore near Irvine, Ayrshire. Her four crew were rescued by the Irvine Lifeboat.
Laurite	(United Kingdom of Great Britain and Ireland) Jersey	The schooner ran aground off Saint Catherine's and broke her back. She was on a voyage from Chausey, Manche, France to London. She was refloated the next day with the assistance of three smacks and towed in to Gorey.
Maggie	United Kingdom	The schooner was sighted off Helsingør, Denmark whilst on a voyage from Danzig, Germany to Aberdeen. No further trace, presumed foundered with the loss of all six crew.
Prince Cadwgan	United Kingdom	The steamship ran aground and sank at Porthclais, Pembrokeshire. Her crew survived. She was on a voyage from Bristol to Solva, Pembrokeshire and Aberaeron, Cardiganshire.
Sandringham	United Kingdom	The steamship was driven ashore in the Zuider Gut. She was on a voyage from Odesa, Russia to Antwerp, Belgium.
Unnamed	Flag unknown	The steamship was driven ashore in the Zuider Gut.

== 7 October ==
List of shipwrecks: 7 October 1876
Ship	State	Description
Ariadne	Netherlands	The steamship ran aground on the Cross Sand in the North Sea off the coast of Norfolk, United Kingdom. She was on a voyage from Rotterdam, South Holland to Sunderland, County Durham, United Kingdom. She was refloated with the assistance of a tug and resumed her voyage.
Cawdor Castle	United Kingdom	The steamship was wrecked in the Hooghly River downstream of Kedgeree, India with the loss of eight of her crew. She was on a voyage from Calcutta, India to Colombo, Ceylon.
Europa	Germany	The barque was severely damaged by fire at New York, United States.
George and Ann	United Kingdom	The Mersey Flat collided with a steamship and sank at Liverpool, Lancashire.
India	United Kingdom	The ship was destroyed by fire 50 nautical miles (93 km) south east of Pernambuco, Brazil. Her crew were rescued. She was on a voyage from Birkenhead, Cheshire, to Rangoon, Burma.
Ino	United Kingdom	The brig ran aground. She was on a voyage from Gävle, Sweden to Ipswich, Suffolk. She was refloated and put in to Helsingør, Denmark in a leaky condition.
Lucia	Germany	The brig ran aground in the River Tay. She was on a voyage from Dundee, Forfarshire, United Kingdom to Stettin. She was refloated and put back to Dundee in a leaky condition.
Sift	United Kingdom	The schooner ran aground on Hanstholm, Denmark. She was on a voyage from Newcastle upon Tyne, Northumberland, United Kingdom to Helsinki, Grand Duchy of Finland. She was refloated and taken into Slite, Sweden for repairs.

== 8 October ==
List of shipwrecks: 8 October 1876
Ship	State	Description
Actif	Denmark	The ship collided with the steamship H. F. Ullrichs (Norway) and sank. Her crew were rescued.
Emma	Germany	The schooner sank at Danzig with the loss of all but two of her crew. She was on a voyage from Pillau to Stockton-on-Tees, County Durham, United Kingdom.
Grange	United Kingdom	The schooner was driven ashore near South Queensferry, Lothian. She was on a voyage from Bo'ness to Granton.
Kom An	Sweden	The brig was driven ashore on Skagen, Denmark. Her crew were rescued. She was on a voyage from Hull, Yorkshire, United Kingdom to Gothenburg.
May	United Kingdom	The schooner departed from Gijón for Málaga, Spain. No further trace, reported missing.
M. M. Jones	United Kingdom	The barque was driven ashore at East London, Cape Colony.
Nellie	Flag unknown	The schooner Hannah Rice (Russia), under Capt. Hutchinson, on her way with supplies for the whaling station of Mamga in Tugur Bay, found the wreck of the 20-ton vessel Nellie in September 1877 in Yakshin Bay, on the south side of Great Shantar Island, in the western Sea of Okhotsk. She had struck a sunken rock during a gale the previous fall and was beached at high tide. Four men were found dead in a cabin nearby. According to the log found with one of the bodies, they had died of scurvy in April 1877. The Nellie had been on a gold prospecting expedition to Siberia.
Recruit	United Kingdom	The schooner departed from Labrador, Newfoundland Colony for Teignmouth, Devon. No further trace, presumed foundered with the loss of all hands.
Stella	Norway	The schooner was driven ashore in Algoa Bay. Her crew were rescued.
Somina	Russia	The schooner was wrecked at Cranz, Germany. She was on a voyage from Pillau to Memel.

== 9 October ==
List of shipwrecks: 9 October 1876
Ship	State	Description
Anna	Italy	The barque was driven ashore at Östergarn, Sweden. She was on a voyage from Kotka, Grand Duchy of Finland to Marseille, Bouches-du-Rhône, France.
Eliza Griffiths	United Kingdom	The schooner was wrecked near Lysekil, Norway. Her crew were rescued.
Enniskillen	United Kingdom	The steamship ran aground at Saltholmen, Denmark.
Hilda	United Kingdom	The steamship ran aground at "Sundrevet", Denmark.
Hope	United Kingdom	The Thames barge sprang a leak and foundered off the Whittaker Spit, in the North Sea off the coast of Essex. Her crew were rescued. She was on a voyage from Burnham-on-Crouch to Colchester.
John Vilas	United States	The lumber schooner capsized in Lake Michigan between Kenosha and Racine, Wisconsin in a gale and heavy seas. She broke up after four hours. All six crew were rescued by Andrew Jackson (United States).
Neptun	Germany	The brig was wrecked near Lysekil. Her crew were rescued. She was on a voyage from Newcastle upon Tyne, Northumberland, United Kingdom to Gothenburg, Sweden.
Waldo	United Kingdom	The barque was abandoned in the Atlantic Ocean. Her crew were rescued by Birger (Russia). Waldo was on a voyage from Boston, Massachusetts, United States to Falmouth, Cornwall or Queenstown, County Cork.

== 10 October ==
List of shipwrecks: 10 October 1876
Ship	State	Description
Marie	Germany	The ship was driven ashore at "Lostrup". Her crew were rescued. She was on a voyage from Leer to Wismar.
Templar	United Kingdom	The barque was driven ashore in Chesapeake Bay. She was on a voyage from Demerara, British Guiana to New York.
Sea Witch	United Kingdom	The lugger capsized at Elie, Fife. Her three crew were rescued by the Coastguard.
Sirian Star	Canada	The barque ran aground and was wrecked on the Banjaard Sand, in the North Sea off the coast of Zeeland, Netherlands. Her crew were rescued by a steamship. She was on a voyage from Richmond, Virginia, United States to Rotterdam, South Holland, Netherlands.

== 11 October ==
List of shipwrecks: 11 October 1876
Ship	State	Description
Basuto	France	The steamship foundered off A Coruña, Spain. Her crew were rescued. She was on a voyage from Cardiff, Glamorgan, United Kingdom to Marseille, Bouches-du-Rhône.
Bessie	United Kingdom	The ship was driven out to sea from Madeira and capsized with the presumed loss of all hands.
British Queen	United Kingdom	The lugger collided with the brig Buccleuch (United Kingdom) and was abandoned in the North Sea. Her crew were rescued by Buccleuch. British Queen was subsequently towed in to Lowestoft, Suffolk by the tug Meteor (United Kingdom).
Chalco	United Kingdom	The ship foundered in the Atlantic Ocean (47°16′N 19°08′W). Her twelve crew were rescued by the brig Francis John ( (United Kingdom of Great Britain and Ireland) Jersey). Chalco was on a voyage from "Half Jack", on the west coast of Africa to Bristol, Gloucestershire.
Charm	United Kingdom	The ship ran aground at Pittenweem, Fife. She was on a voyage from Granton, Lothian to Pittenweem.
Fear Not	Germany	The barque was driven ashore and wrecked on Madeira.
Nadeshda	Russia	The steamship sprang a leak and was beached at Bolderāja. She was on a voyage from Riga to Helsinki, Grand Duchy of Finland. She was later refloated and taken in to Bolderāja for repairs.
Theodosia	United Kingdom	The schooner was driven ashore and wrecked at Madeira. Her crew were rescued. She was on a voyage from Cardiff to Madeira.
Thermuthis	United Kingdom	The brig sprang a leak and was abandoned in Mother Ivy's Bay. Her crew survived. She was on a voyage from Cardiff to Demerara, British Guiana. She camed ashore at Tregudda, Cornwall and was a total loss.
Vigilant	United Kingdom	The cutter was run down and sunk in the Thames Estuary off Yantlet, Kent by the steamship Cymbra (United Kingdom). She was refloated on 13 October and towed to Gravesend, Kent the next day and beached there.
Unnamed	Portugal	The schooner was driven ashore and wrecked on Madeira.
Unnamed	Germany	The barque was driven ashore and wrecked on Madeira with the loss of a crew member.

== 12 October ==
List of shipwrecks: 12 October 1876
Ship	State	Description
Falke	Germany	The steamship ran aground in the River Thames. She was on a voyage from Bremen to London, United Kingdom. She was refloated with the assistance of a tug and resumed her voyage the next morning.
Hufrsfraud	Norway	The ship was abandoned in the Atlantic Ocean (48°38′N 41°00′W). Her crew were rescued by the barque John Abbott (United Kingdom). Hufrsfraud was on a voyage from London to Saint John's, Newfoundland Colony.
Mary Jane	United Kingdom	The schooner was abandoned in the Atlantic Ocean 25 nautical miles (46 km) south west of the Isles of Scilly. Her five crew were rescued by the steamship Bulgarian (United Kingdom). Mary Jane was on a voyage from Bilbao, Spain to Swansea, Glamorgan.
Rachel	United Kingdom	The brig was sighted in the Atlantic Ocean whilst on a voyage from Burry Port, Glamorgan to Montreal, Quebec, Canada. No further trace, presumed foundered with the loss of all ten crew.
Rose	United Kingdom	The ship ran aground on the Maplin Sand, in the North Sea off the coast of Essex. She was refloated with the assistance of a tug.
Sigfred	Sweden	The ship was wrecked at Westervik. Her crew were rescued. She was on a voyage from Newcastle upon Tyne, Northumberland, United Kingdom to Gothenburg.
S. P. W.	United Kingdom	The schooner departed from Newport, Monmouthshire for Plymouth, Devon. No further trace, presumed foundered with the loss of all hands.

== 13 October ==
List of shipwrecks: 13 October 1876
Ship	State	Description
Armoria	Spain	The barque ran aground at Tarifa. She was on a voyage from Barcelona to Havana, Cuba. She was refloated and put in to Algeciras.
Concurrent	United Kingdom	The schooner was driven ashore at "Parrisbae". Her crew were rescued. She was on a voyage from Newcastle upon Tyne, Northumberland, United Kingdom to Narva, Russia.
Johanna	Flag unknown	The ship was wrecked at Vardø, Norway.
Kiu Shan	United Kingdom	The steamship departed from Cardiff, Glamorgan for Tangier, Morocco. No further trace, reported missing.
Laconia	United Kingdom	The steamship was driven ashore at Smyrna, Ottoman Empire. She was on a voyage from Liverpool, Lancashire to Constantinople, Ottoman Empire. She was refloated the next day and resumed her voyage on 15 October.
Neptunus	Denmark	The ship ran aground at Fredrikshavn. She was on a voyage from Blyth, Northumberland to Grenaa. She was refloated with assistance and put in to Fredirkshavn.
St. Marc	South Australia	The ship was wrecked in McDonnell Bay. Her crew were rescued.
Wilhelmine	Germany	The barque was wrecked on Fair Isle, United Kingdom with the loss of one of her nine crew. She was on a voyage from Granton, Lothian, United Kingdom to Lisbon, Portugal.

== 14 October ==
List of shipwrecks: 14 October 1876
Ship	State	Description
Albert Jures	Germany	The ship departed from St. Anne's Bay, Jamaica for London, United Kingdom. No further trace, reported missing.
Conte Sierra	Spain	The ship sprang a leak and was beached at Las Palmas, Gran Canaria, Canary Islands. She was on a voyage from Las Palmas to Matanzas, Cuba.
Glenavon	United Kingdom	The steamship ran aground in the Haff off Pillau, Germany. She was on a voyage from Königsberg to Pillau. She was refloated.
Golconda	United Kingdom	The barque was driven ashore and wrecked at Cape Attaro, Sardinia, Italy. She was on a voyage from Phillippeville, French Algeria to Constantinople, Ottoman Empire.
Ida	Germany	The schooner was wrecked at Ringkøbing, Denmark. Her crew were rescued.
Mertede	France	The ship foundered off the coast of Fife, United Kingdom. All seven people on board survived. She was on a voyage from Dysart, Fife to Dunkirk, Nord. She was subsequently taken in to a port.
Ranger	United Kingdom	The barque was run down by the steamship Harraton (United Kingdom) and sank off the Dudgeon Lightship ( Trinity House). Her nine crew survived. Ranger was on a voyage from Sunderland, County Durham to Great Yarmouth, Norfolk.
Sophora	France	The ship was wrecked on the Monies, off the coast of Finistère with the presumed loss of all hands.
Venus	United Kingdom	The schooner was driven ashore in Brygga Yell Sound, Shetland Islands. She was refloated with the assistance of the steamship Ambrosine (United Kingdom) and taken in to "Topsooe" in a leaky condition.
William Banks	United Kingdom	The steamship collided with HMS Thunderer (Royal Navy and then with the quayside and sank at Portsmouth, Hampshire. She was on a voyage from Cardiff, Glamorgan to Portsmouth Dockyard. She was refloated on 17 October and placed under repair.
Zealot	United Kingdom	The steamship was wrecked on the Daedalus Reef, in the Red Sea. Her crew were rescued by a French ship. She was on a voyage from Liverpool, Lancashire to Bombay, India.

== 15 October ==
List of shipwrecks: 15 October 1876
Ship	State	Description
Ada Ireldale	United Kingdom	The ship was destroyed by fire at sea with the loss of a crew member. She was on a voyage from Ardrossan, Ayrshire to San Francisco, California, United States.
Fairy Queen	United Kingdom	The steamship was driven ashore at Stornoway, Isle of Lewis, Outer Hebrides. She was refloated the next day and resumed her voyage.
Zephyr	United Kingdom	The brigantine was destroyed by fire at Campbeltown, Argyllshire. She was on a voyage from Troon, Ayrshire to Newry, County Antrim.

== 16 October ==
List of shipwrecks: 16 October 1876
Ship	State	Description
Alert	United Kingdom	The tug sank at Plymouth, Devon. On being raised, it was found that holes had been bored in her hull with an auger.
Cecilie	Denmark	The ship was driven ashore on Læsø. She was refloated and resumed her voyage.
Friedrich Krupp	Germany	The steamship ran aground at Leith, Lothian, United Kingdom. She was refloated with the assistance of a tug and found to be leaky.
Harriet	United Kingdom	The steamship ran aground at Maassluis, South Holland, Netherlands. She was refloated.
Johanna	Germany	The barque sprang a leak and was abandoned at sea. Her crew were rescued. She was on a voyage from Cardiff, Glamorgan, United Kingdom to Madeira.
Mater	France	The lugger was abandoned in the Firth of Forth. She was subsequently taken in to Elie, Fife, United Kingdom.
Ondine	United Kingdom	The brigantine was driven ashore at Caravelas, Brazil. She was on a voyage from Montevideo, Uruguay to Falmouth, Cornwall.
Trebizond	United Kingdom	The ship departed from Kronstadt, Russia for a British port. No further trace, reported missing.
Ville d'Anvers	Belgium	The barque ran aground on the Tuns Bank, off Inishowen, County Donegal, United Kingdom. She was on a voyage from Baltimore, Maryland, United States to Liverpool, Lancashire, United Kingdom. She was refloated and towed in to Moville, County Donegal.

== 17 October ==
List of shipwrecks: 17 October 1876
Ship	State	Description
Active	Norway	The ship was driven ashore and wrecked at Berwick upon Tweed, Northumberland, United Kingdom. Her crew were rescued. She was on a voyage from Drammen to Alloa, Clackmannanshire, United Kingdom.
Agantyr	United Kingdom	The ship was driven ashore at Whitehaven, Cumberland. She was refloated and taken in to Whitehaven.
Amalia	Sweden	The schooner foundered in the North Sea off Hartlepool, County Durham, United Kingdom with the loss of all hands.
Copia	United Kingdom	The steamship caught fire at Gibraltar. She was on a voyage from Sulina, Ottoman Empire to Falmouth, Cornwall.
Emma Busch	Germany	The brig was driven ashore and wrecked at "Swante", west of Ystad, Sweden. She was on a voyage from West Hartlepool, County Durham to Stettin.
Falcon	United Kingdom	The ship ran aground in the River Barrow and was damaged. She was refloated and taken in to New Ross, County Wexford.
Hertha	Norway	The ship was driven ashore at Sando, Gotland, Sweden. Her crew were rescued. She was on a voyage from Helsinki, Grand Duchy of Finland to Grangemouth, Stirlingshire, United Kingdom.
Mullenhott	Russia	The brig foundered off Hartlepool with the loss of all hands.
Octive	Norway	The ship was driven ashore and wrecked at Berwick upon Tweed, Northumberland, United Kingdom. She was on a voyage from Drammen to Alloa, Clackmannanshire, United Kingdom.
Vixen	United Kingdom	The ship ran aground on the Blyth Sand. She was refloated with assistance and towed in to Gravesend, Kent.
Unnamed	Norway	The brig was driven ashore on Vlieland, Friesland, Netherlands.

== 18 October ==
List of shipwrecks: 18 October 1876
Ship	State	Description
Elizabeth Rose	United Kingdom	The brig was driven ashore north of Scarborough, Yorkshire with the loss of her captain. She was on a voyage from Cowes, Isle of Wight to Sunderland, County Durham.
Evening Star	United Kingdom	The barque was wrecked on Grand Cayman, Cayman Islands with the loss of ten of her seventeen crew. She was on a voyage from the Cape Verde Islands to Pensacola, Florida, United States.
Fervent, and Ostrich	United Kingdom	The steamship Ostrich collided with the steam collier in the River Thames and was beached on the Blyth Sand. She was on a voyage from Antwerp, Belgium to London. Fervent sank.
Hakon Jarl	Norway	The steamship ran aground and was wrecked at "Bevelstead", Heligoland.
Hortense	Germany	The schooner was driven ashore and wrecked at Thisted, Denmark. Her crew were rescued. She was on a voyage from Papenburg to Dram, Norway.
Naima	(Russian Empire) Grand Duchy of Finland	The brig was wrecked on the North Gar Sand, at the mouth of the River Tees. Her crew were rescued by the steamship Glencoe (United Kingdom). Naima was on a voyage from Middlesbrough, Yorkshire to Helsinki.
Orisco	Norway	The barque ran aground on the Niddelgrund, off Kastrup, Denmark. She was on a voyage from Vyborg, Grand Duchy of Finland to West Hartlepool, County Durham. She was refloated with assistance on 23 October and taken in to Copenhagen, Denmark.
Rydal Hall	United Kingdom	The ship was driven ashore at Pillar Point, California, United States with the loss of nine of her crew. She was on a voyage from Cardiff, Glamorgan to San Francisco, California.
Windsor Castle	United Kingdom	The troopship ran aground on a reef off Dassen Island, Cape Colony and was wrecked. All on board, more than 200 people, survived. Her passengers were taken off Dassen Island the next day by the steamship Florence (Cape Colony). Windsor Castle was on a voyage from London to Cape Town, Cape Colony. The ship broke up on 26 October.
412	Russia	The lighter sank at Kronstadt.

== 19 October ==
List of shipwrecks: 19 October 1876
Ship	State	Description
Ageroen	Norway	The barque was driven ashore and wrecked at Nidingen, Sweden. She was on a voyage from Kronstadt, Russia to Gloucester, United Kingdom.
Annie	United Kingdom	The steamship ran aground at Maassluis, South Holland, Netherlands. She was on a voyage from Middlesbrough, Yorkshire to Rotterdam, South Holland.
Britannia	United Kingdom	The ship ran aground on the Carr Rock, off Eyemouth, Berwickshire. She was on a voyage from Eyemouth to Granton, Lothian.
Catherine Latham	United Kingdom	The schooner collided with the brigantine Fellow Craft (United Kingdom) and sank in the Irish Sea 5 nautical miles (9.3 km) north by west of the Copeland Islands, County Down. Her crew were rescued. Catherine Latham was on a voyage from Barrow-in-Furness, Lancashire to "Redbay".
Grebe	United Kingdom	The steamship ran into the steamship Switzerland (Belgium) at Vlissingen, Zeeland, Netherlands and sank with the loss of a crew member. Grebe was on a voyage from Liverpool, Lancashire to Antwerp, Belgium.
Importer	United States	The full-rigged ship was damaged by fire at Manila, Spanish East Indies.
Keystone	Canada	The barque collided with the full-rigged ship Hyppolyte (United Kingdom) and foundered in the Atlantic Ocean 120 nautical miles (220 km) west of the Isles of Scilly, United Kingdom. Her crew were rescued by Hyppolyte. Keystone was on a voyage from Baltimore, Maryland, United States to King's Lynn, Norfolk, United Kingdom.
Spindrift	United Kingdom	The tug collided with the tug Victory (United Kingdom) and other vessels. She was severely damaged.

== 20 October ==
List of shipwrecks: 20 October 1876
Ship	State	Description
Barbara	Germany	The schooner was driven ashore and wrecked at Nexø, Denmark. She was on a voyage from Memel to Alloa, Clackmannanshire, United Kingdom.
Betsy Laura	Denmark	The ship collided with another vessel and foundered. Her crew were rescued. She was on a voyage from Newcastle upon Tyne, Northumberland, United Kingdom to Odense.
Coldstream	United Kingdom	The brig ran aground on Holmetung, Denmark. She was on a voyage from Kronstadt, Russia to Helsingør, Denmark. She was refloated and resumed her voyage.
Guiseppe Mateo	Austria-Hungary	The barque was abandoned at sea. Her crew were rescued by Baron Selbourne (United Kingdom). Guiseppe Mateo was on a voyage from Garrucha, Spain to Marseille, Bouches-du-Rhône, France.
Jerome	United Kingdom	The schooner sprang a leak and foundered 8 nautical miles (15 km) off The Maidens, County Antrim. Her crew were rescued.
John Williamson	United Kingdom	The steamship ran aground on the Barrel Rock, in the Irish Sea.
Vixen	United Kingdom	The schooner was driven ashore and wrecked on the Longnose Rocks, Margate, Kent. Her crew were rescued.

== 21 October ==
List of shipwrecks: 21 October 1876
Ship	State	Description
Cecilie	Denmark	The schooner was driven ashore at North Somercotes, Lincolnshire, United Kingdom.
Memory	United Kingdom	The ship ran aground at Belize City, British Honduras. She was on a voyage from Belize City to Liverpool, Lancashire. She was refloated the next day and resumed her voyage.
Oreti	New Zealand	The 66-ton schooner hit rocks and broke up when the wind unexpectedly died while she was leaving Queen Charlotte Sound. Her crew were rescued.

== 22 October ==
List of shipwrecks: 22 October 1876
Ship	State	Description
Ann Catherine	United Kingdom	The steamship, a coaster, collided with the steamship Copeland (United Kingdom) and sank in the River Lee. Her crew were rescued.
Galeed	United Kingdom	The steamship ran aground at Maassluis, South Holland, Netherlands. She was refloated and put back to Rotterdam, South Holland.
Kate Gregory	India	The full-rigged ship was destroyed by fire in the Bay of Bengal. Her crew were rescued by an America vessel. She was on a voyage from Calcutta to Galle, Ceylon.
Lightning	United Kingdom	The tug collided with Jane Edwards (United Kingdom), was run into by the brig she was towing, and sank off South Shields, County Durham. Her captain got aboard Jane Edwards, and her crew were rescued by the tug Sunbeam (United Kingdom).
Trientje	Germany	The ship was driven ashore on Ameland, Friesland, Netherlands. She was on a voyage from Middlesbrough, Yorkshire, United Kingdom to Brake.

== 23 October ==
List of shipwrecks: 23 October 1876
Ship	State	Description
American Eagle	United States	The ship was driven ashore and wrecked at "Gagri", in the Black Sea with the loss of a crew member.
Dronning Sophie	Norway	The steamship was run into by the steamship Stephensons (United Kingdom) and was severely damaged.
Giuseppe	Italy	The barque was driven ashore at Almería, Spain. She was on a voyage from Palermo, Sicily to Philadelphia, Pennsylvania, United States.
Jorgen Ring	Denmark	The schooner was driven ashore and wrecked in the Nieuwe Diep. Her crew were rescued. She was on a voyage from Liepāja, Courland Governorate to Schiedam, South Holland, Netherlands.
Kong Oscar	Norway	The steamship was driven ashore north of Bergen. She was on a voyage from Kristiansund to a Baltic port. She was a total loss.
Linda Florida	United Kingdom	The ship struck the pier at West Hartlepool, County Durham and was beached. She was on a voyage from Kronstadt, Russia to Kronstadt.
Royal Family	United Kingdom	The ship departed from Bassein, India for a British port. No further trace, reported missing.
Storegen Abrahamson	Sweden	The ship ran aground off Vyborg, Grand Duchy of Finland and was wrecked. Her crew were rescued. She was on a voyage from "Weggo" to Vyborg.
St. Peter	United Kingdom	The ship struck the Gindura Rock and was beached 3 nautical miles (5.6 km) from Galle, Ceylon. She was a total loss. She was on a voyage from Cardiff, Glamorgan to Galle.

== 24 October ==
List of shipwrecks: 24 October 1876
Ship	State	Description
Adeline	(Canada)	The barquentine was wrecked at Land Point, in the Gut of Canso. She was on a voyage from London to Prince Edward Island, Canada.
Cynthia	United Kingdom	The fishing smack foundered off Winterton-on-Sea, Norfolk with the loss of all eleven crew.
Marengo	United Kingdom	The barque was wrecked at East London, Cape Colony.
Nestor	United Kingdom	The ship ran aground at Rotterdam, South Holland, Netherlands.
Welcome	United Kingdom	The Galway hooker was driven ashore and wrecked at Youghal, County Cork. Her crew were rescued. She was on a voyage from Cork to Whiting Bay.

== 25 October ==
List of shipwrecks: 25 October 1876
Ship	State	Description
Aurora	Netherlands	The East Indiaman departed from Batavia, Netherlands East Indies for Rotterdam, South Holland, Netherlands. No further trace, presumed foundered with the loss of all 30 crew.
Danaes	United Kingdom	The ship ran aground at West Cowes, Isle of Wight. She was on a voyage from Moulmein, Burma to Antwerp, Belgium. She was refloated and taken in to West Cowes.
Volunteer	United Kingdom	The schooner ran aground on the Haisborough Sands, in the North Sea off the coast of Norfolk and was abandoned by her crew. She was on a voyage from Great Yarmouth, Norfolk to Leith, Lothian. She was refloated with the assistance of a smack and a tug and taken in to Lowestoft, Suffolk in a severely leaky condition.

== 26 October ==
List of shipwrecks: 26 October 1876
Ship	State	Description
Aurora	Netherlands	The ship departed from Batavia, Netherlands East Indies for a Dutch port. Subsequently foundered in the Indian Ocean. A lifebelt and wreckage from the ship washed up on Zitzikamma Point, Cape Colony on 5 January 1877.
Cora Green	United States	The brig was driven ashore at Grado, Italy. She was on a voyage from Richmond, Virginia to Trieste.
Douglas	United Kingdom	The steamship ran aground on the Gelb Sand, in the North Sea off the German coast. She was on a voyage from Hamburg, Germany to Newcastle upon Tyne, Northumberland. She was refloated the next day and resumed her voyage.
Onjeborg	Denmark	The galeas was driven ashore at Langeland. She was on a voyage from an English port to "Neustad". She was refloated with the assistance of a steamship and towed in to Svendborg.
Rose	United Kingdom	The schooner ran aground on the North Danger Reef, on the South China Sea and was wrecked with the loss of her captain. Some of the survivors were rescued by Celestial Queen (United Kingdom). Rose was on a voyage from Fuzhou, China to Fremantle, Western Australia.
Weaver	United Kingdom	The Mersey Flat collided with Hercules (United Kingdom) and sank at Liverpool, Lancashire.
Unnamed	Russia	The lighter collided with the steamship Alexander II (Russia) and sank at Kronstadt.

== 27 October ==
List of shipwrecks: 27 October 1876
Ship	State	Description
Glenrosa	United Kingdom	The steamship caught fire whilst on a voyage from Dunkirk, Nord to Leith, Lothian. The fire was extinguished but the crew's quarters were severely damaged.
Java	Netherlands	The ship departed from Batavia, Netherlands East Indies for a Dutch port. No further trace, reported missing.
Jessie	United Kingdom	The schooner was driven ashore at Dungenes, Kent. She was on a voyage from Antwerp Belgium to "Carmina". She was refloated with assistance from the tug Rambler (United Kingdom) and was taken in to Falmouth, Cornwall.
Marchioness of Queensbury	United Kingdom	The barque was driven ashore and wrecked on Langlade Island. Her crew were rescued. She was on a voyage from Quebec City, Canada to Port Glasgow, Renfrewshire.
Oberon	United Kingdom	The steamship put in to Norfolk, Virginia, United States on fire. She was on a voyage from New Orleans, Louisiana, United States to Liverpool, Lancashire. The fire was extinguished.

== 28 October ==
List of shipwrecks: 28 October 1876
Ship	State	Description
Christine	Germany	The schooner foundered in the Atlantic Ocean. Her crew were rescued by Duchess (United Kingdom).
Monkshaven	United Kingdom	The ship caught fire and was abandoned in the Atlantic Ocean off the coast of Patagonia, Argentina. Her crew were rescued by the yacht Sunbeam (United Kingdom). Monkshaven was on a voyage from Swansea, Glamorgan to Valparaíso, Chile.
Symmetry	United Kingdom	The schooner was abandoned in the Irish Sea 40 nautical miles (74 km) south west of Holyhead, Anglesey. Her four crew were rescued by the tug Great Emperor (United Kingdom). Symmetry was on a voyage from Bangor to Waterford.
Willie	United Kingdom	The schooner ran aground on the West Shoebury Sand, in the Thames Estuary. She was on a voyage from London to Waterford. She was refloated.

== 29 October ==
List of shipwrecks: 29 October 1876
Ship	State	Description
Attwood	United Kingdom	The brigantine struck the Goldstone Rock, in the Farne Islands, Northumberland and sank. Her crew were rescued. She was on a voyage from Granton, Lothian to Boulogne, Pas-de-Calais, France.
Aurora	Norway	The ship was driven ashore and wrecked at "Nimmersalt", Germany. Her crew were rescued.
Avaldo	Austria-Hungary	The barque was destroyed by fire in the Atlantic Ocean. Her thirteen crew were rescued by E. C. T. (United Kingdom). Avaldo was on a voyage from Havre de Grâce, Seine-Inférieure, France to New Orleans, Louisiana, United States.

== 30 October ==
List of shipwrecks: 30 October 1876
Ship	State	Description
Aimable Victoire	France	The sloop collided with a tug and sank at Havre de Grâce, Seine-Inférieure. She was on a voyage from Havre de Grâce to Pont-Audemer, Eure.
Ane Catherine	Norway	The ship ran aground at "Marigger". Her crew survived. She was on a voyage from Newcastle upon Tyne, Northumberland to "Heboe". She was refloated and taken in to Randers in a leaky condition.
Catherine	United Kingdom	The brig ran aground and heeled over in the River Carron. She subsequently became a wreck.
City of Canterbury, and John Straker	United Kingdom	The steamships collided in the Clyde at Greenock, Renfrewshire and both ran aground.
Condor	Norway	The brig was abandoned at sea. Her crew were rescued by the steamship Alabama (United Kingdom). Condor was on a voyage from Drammen to the Nieuwe Diep. She was driven ashore and wrecked at Thisted, Denmark.
Ellen	United Kingdom	The dandy was driven ashore at Howth, County Dublin. Her crew were rescued. She was on a voyage from Mostyn, Flintshire to Bray, County Wicklow.
Genova	United Kingdom	The steamship was driven ashore on Goeree, Zeeland, Netherlands. She was on a voyage from Middlesbrough, Yorkshire to Rotterdam, South Holland, Netherlands. She was refloated with the assistance of tugs and completed her voyage.
Heimadal	Norway	The galeas was driven ashore at "Apranes", Iceland. Her crew were rescued. She was consequently condemned.
Houghton	United Kingdom	The ship ran aground in the Seine at Rouen, Seine-Inférieure.
John Straker	United Kingdom	The steamship ran aground in the Clyde at Renfrew. She was run into by the steamship City of Canterbury (United Kingdom).
Jules Bertrand	France	The brigantine was driven ashore in Elberry Cove, Devon, United Kingdom. Her crew were rescued.
Louise	Germany	The galiot was driven ashore and wrecked at Thisted. Her crew were rescued. She was on a voyage from Holmstad, Norway to London, United Kingdom.
Marie Françoise	United Kingdom	The lugger was driven ashore at Broadsands, Devon. Her crew were rescued. She was on a voyage from Swansea, Glamorgan, United Kingdom to Nantes, Loire-Inférieure.
Nuovo Alberto	Italy	The schooner was wrecked off the coast of Italy. She was on a voyage from Carrara to Marseille, Bouches-du-Rhône, France.
Repart	United Kingdom	The ship was driven ashore on Inchgarvie, in the Firth of Forth.
Simea	Russia	The schooner ran aground at Arkhangelsk.
Waipa	New Zealand	The ship foundered with the loss of all hands, according to a message in a bottle picked up by a French fishing boat off Boulogne, Pas-de-Calais on 15 February 1877.
Unnamed	United Kingdom	The schooner ran aground at Belfast, County Antrim.

== 31 October ==
List of shipwrecks: 31 October 1876
Ship	State	Description
Ben Nevis	United Kingdom	The steamship was driven ashore at Marianople, Russia. She was on a voyage from Taganrog, Russia to Antwerp, Belgium. She was refloated and resumed her voyage.
British Statesman	United Kingdom	1876 Bengal cyclone: The ship was damaged in the Bay of Bengal in a cyclone. She was on a voyage from Liverpool, Lancashire to Calcutta, India.
Ellide	Denmark	The ship was driven ashore near "Marnedsund". She was on a voyage from Stege to Sunderland, County Durham, United Kingdom.
Ghazeepore	India	1876 Bengal cyclone: The ship was damaged in the Bay of Bengal in a cyclone. She was on a voyage from Liverpool to Calcutta.
Haveborg	Norway	The ship was driven ashore and wrecked at Memel, Germany. Her crew were rescued.
Ladybird	United Kingdom	The ship ran aground on the Ovens Flat. She was on a voyage from Sunderland, County Durham to London.
Lady Octavia	United Kingdom	1876 Bengal cyclone: The ship was damaged in the Bay of Bengal in a cyclone. She put in to Calcutta.
Lord Northbrook	United Kingdom	The ship was driven ashore and wrecked on Diamond Island, Burma. Her crew were rescued. She was on a voyage from Aden to Bassein, India.
Magnus	United Kingdom	1876 Bengal cyclone: The ship was damaged in the Bay of Bengal in a cyclone. She put in to Calcutta.
Moulmein	United Kingdom	1876 Bengal cyclone: The steamship was damaged in the Bay of Bengal in a cyclone. She put in to Calcutta.
Palmas	United Kingdom	1876 Bengal cyclone: The ship was damaged in the Bay of Bengal in a cyclone. She put in to Calcutta.
Penang	United Kingdom	1876 Bengal cyclone: The steamship was damaged in the Bay of Bengal in a cyclone. She put in to Calcutta.
Penthesilia	United Kingdom	1876 Bengal cyclone: The ship was damaged in the Bay of Bengal in a cyclone. She was on a voyage from Cardiff, Glamorgan to Calcutta.
Poulingen	France	The schooner was driven ashore at Goedereede, South Holland, Netherlands. She was on a voyage from Nantes, Loire-Inférieure to Rotterdam, South Holland.
Prince Waldemar	United Kingdom	1876 Bengal cyclone: The ship was wrecked on the Balchery Sands, near the mouth of the Hooghly River in a cyclone with the loss of 26 of her 30 crew. She was on a voyage from Liverpool to Calcutta.
Scottish Chieftain	United Kingdom	1876 Bengal cyclone: The ship was damaged in the Bay of Bengal in a cyclone. She put in to Calcutta.
St' Patrick	United Kingdom	The steamship struck the wreck of the steamship Edith (United Kingdom) off Holyhead, Anglesey and was damaged. She was on a voyage from Holyhead to Kingstown, County Dublin. She put back to Holyhead.
Timour	United Kingdom	1876 Bengal cyclone: The ship was reported to have capsized in the Bay of Bengal in a cyclone. She was on a voyage from Dundee, Forfarshire to Calcutta. If she had capsized, she was righted and completed her voyage.

== Unknown date ==
List of shipwrecks: Unknown date in October 1876
Ship	State	Description
Aldebaran	United Kingdom	The steamship was driven ashore on Anticosti Island, Nova Scotia, Canada. She was on a voyage from Quebec City, Canada to Glasgow, Renfrewshire. She was a total loss.
Amoor	Canada	The ship was abandoned at sea. She was on a voyage from Milk River, Alberta to Queenstown, County Cork, United Kingdom.
Atlantic	Norway	The barque ran into USS Vandalia (United States Navy) in the Atlantic Ocean, severely damaging her own bows. Atlantic was on a voyage from Oran, Algeria to Leith, Lothian, United Kingdom. She was towed in to Lisbon, Portugal by USS Vandalia, arriving on 1 November.
Auffredy	United Kingdom	The barque was wrecked on the Black Hall Rocks, near Hartlepool, County Durham. Her crew survived, three were rescued by the Hartlepool Lifeboat Charles Mather ( Royal National Lifeboat Institution).
British Oak	United Kingdom	The schooner was run down and sunk in the Bristol Channel by the schooner Robert Brown (United Kingdom). Her crew were rescued.
Brothers	United Kingdom	The brig was abandoned in the Atlantic Ocean before 6 October. She was on a voyage from Lisbon to Plymouth, Devon.
Cedric	United Kingdom	The barque was driven ashore and wrecked on Trinidad before 23 October.
Celine Madeline	France	The ship ran aground and was wrecked near Estepona, Spain. Her crew were rescued. She was on a voyage from Marseille, Bouches-du-Rhône to Brazil. She was refloated with assistance from the steamship James Haynes (United Kingdom), which towed her in to Málaga, Spain
Charles	United Kingdom	The ship was driven ashore and wrecked at Matane, Quebec, Canada. She was on a voyage from London to Quebec City.
City of Austin	United States	The steamship was driven ashore at Galveston, Texas. She was refloated.
City of Houston	United Kingdom	The steamship was driven ashore before 28 October. She was on a voyage from New York to Galveston. She was refloated and towed in to Key West, Florida.
Clairellen	United Kingdom	The barque caught fire and was abandoned in the South Atlantic before 23 October. Her crew were rescued. She was on a voyage from Hull to Valparaíso, Chile.
Cort Adder	Norway	The ship was abandoned in the Atlantic Ocean before 10 October. Her fifteen crew were rescued by Hypatia (United Kingdom).
Edith	United Kingdom	The brig was wrecked at Puerto Cabello, Venezuela before 6 October.
Esperance	United Kingdom	The brigantine was driven ashore and wrecked at "Campbelton", Prince Edward Island, Canada. She was on a voyage from Liverpool, Lancashire to Cascumpec, Prince Edward Island.
Fidelite	United Kingdom	The schooner caught fire and was run ashore on the Isle of Mull, where she became a wreck.
François Piccioni	France	The barque was destroyed by fire at sea before 20 October. Her crew were rescued by the barque Pekin (United States). François Piccioni was on a voyage from Marseille to Bayonne, Basses-Pyrénées.
George Peabody	United States	The schooner was wrecked at Bay St. Lawrence. The wreck was sold.
Glencairn	United Kingdom	The brig ran aground on the Platters, in the North Sea off the coast of Essex. She was refloated with assistance from the smack Argo and the tug Liverpool (both United Kingdom).
Goethe	Denmark	The ship ran aground near Helsingør. She was on a voyage from Hull, Yorkshire, United Kingdom to Præstø. She was refloated.
Helen F.	United States	The whaler, a schooner, was wrecked in the Arctic Sea. Her crew survived.
Highflyer	United Kingdom	The ship was wrecked at Tub Harbour, Labrador, Newfoundland Colony. She was on a voyage from Labrador to Limerick.
Irene	United Kingdom	The ship was driven ashore at Berthier, Quebec. She was on a voyage from Quebec City to Caernarfon. She was refloated and put back to Quebec City.
Joven Amelia	Portugal	The schooner sprang a leak and was abandoned in the Atlantic Ocean before 16 October. Her crew were rescued by the steamship John David (United Kingdom). John and Amelia was on a voyage from Porto to Figueira da Foz.
Jorge	Spain	The ship ran aground on the Molasses Reef and sank. She was on a voyage from Laguna to Marseille, Bouches-du-Rhône, France.
Joseph	France	The brig was driven ashore at Nidingen, Sweden. She was on a voyage from Sundsvall, Sweden to Bergen, Norway. She was refloated on 24 October and taken in to Gothenburg, Sweden in a leaky condition.
Joven Amelia	Portugal	The schooner sprang a leak and was abandoned before 14 October. Her crew were rescued by John David (United Kingdom). Joven Amelia was on a voyage from Porto to Figueira da Foz.
Julia	(Dominion of Newfoundland) Newfoundland Colony	The ship was wrecked on the Narrows Rocks. She was on a voyage from "Chateau" to a Mediterranean port.
Kate P. Lunt	(Canada)	The ship was abandoned at sea. She was on a voyage from New Brunswick to St. Jago de Cuba, Cuba.
Knud	Flag unknown	The ship ran aground at Opobo, Lagos Colony. She was consequently condemned.
Lake Michigan	United Kingdom	The ship was driven ashore at Point Trembles, Quebec She was on a voyage from Glasgow, Renfrewshire to Montreal, Quebec. She was refloated and resumed her voyage.
Maid	Norway	The barque was wrecked in a hurricane of Grand Cayman, Cayman Islands between 17 and 31 October with the loss of at least three of her crew.
Minnesota	United Kingdom	The steamship was driven ashore at Boston, Massachusetts, United States.
Mite	United Kingdom	The schooner was driven ashore at Wexford. She was refloated on 5 October.
M. M. Jones	United Kingdom	The barque was driven ashore at East London, Cape Colony before 8 October.
Newcastle and Arundal Packet	Norway	The ship was wrecked at sea in early October. She was taken in to Aberdeen, United Kingdom in a capsized condition in late November.
Niord	Norway	The ship was wrecked on Grand Cayman, Cayman Islands before 21 October. She was on a voyage from Rio de Janeiro, Brazil to New Orleans, Louisiana, United States.
Norge	Norway	The barque was driven ashore and wrecked on Langlade Island. Her crew were rescued. She was on a voyage from Miramichi, New Brunswick, Canada to Liverpool.
Nor Twelan	Norway	The brig was driven ashore on the Dutch coast. She was refloated on 14 October and taken in to Terschelling, Frisland, Netherlands in a severely leaky condition.
Ocean Gem	United Kingdom	The ship was driven ashore on Goose Island. She was on a voyage from Porto to Quebec City. She was refloated with the assistance of a steamship and resumed her voyage.
Pace	Italy	The barque was destroyed by fire at Odesa, Russia.
Pet	Canada	The ship was wrecked on the coast of Labrador.
Prodomos	Spain	The ship was driven ashore and wrecked near Alicante.
R. H. Purington	United States	The ship was abandoned at sea before 21 October. Her crew were rescued. She was on a voyage from Boston, Massachusetts to London.
Roman	United Kingdom	The ship was driven ashore on Skagen, Denmark. Her crew were rescued. She was on a voyage from Hull to Gothenburg.
Royal Arch	(United Kingdom of Great Britain and Ireland) Jersey	The ship was lost with all hands. She was on a voyage from Roscoff to Pont-Aven, Finistère, France.
San Nicolas	Spain	The brig was run down and sunk by the steamship Martinique (France) before 9 October. Her crew were rescued. She was on a voyage from the Newfoundland Colony to Málaga.
S. G. King	United States	The ship was wrecked in the Chandeleur Islands, Louisiana. She was on a voyage from Havana, Cuba to Mobile, Alabama.
S. P. W.	United Kingdom	The schooner departed from Plymouth for Newport, Monmouthshire. No further trace, presumed foundered with the loss of all hands.
Stella	Norway	The barque was driven ashore and wrecked in Algoa Bay before 8 October. Her crew were rescued.
Sylvia	Germany	The steamship was abandoned at sea. She was on a voyage from Philadelphia, Pennsylvania, United States to Havre de Grâce, Seine-Inférieure, France.
Turner	New South Wales	The ship was destroyed by fire at sea before 7 October. Her crew were rescued.
Two Marys	United Kingdom	The schooner was abandoned in the North Sea before 16 October. Her crew were rescued by the steamship Florence Richards (United Kingdom). Two Marys was on a voyage from Grangemouth, Stirlingshire to Gothenburg, Sweden.
Typhena	United Kingdom	The ship ran aground at Huelva, Spain. She was refloated on 21 October.
United States	United States	The ship was destroyed by fire off Cape Horn, Chile. Her crew were rescued by Yarmouth (United Kingdom). United States was on a voyage from Liverpool to San Francisco, California.
Unity	United Kingdom	The barque was driven ashore at Richibucto, New Brunswick. She was on a voyage from Richibucto to London. She was refloated.
Vale	United Kingdom	The steamship was driven ashore on Öland, Sweden. She was refloated on 1 November.
Victory	United Kingdom	The brigantine was driven ashore in the Gut of Canso. She was on a voyage from Glasgow to Charlottetown, Prince Edward Island.
Walrus	(Dominion of Newfoundland) Newfoundland Colony	The sealer, a converted Philomel-class gunvessel. was wrecked on Black Island with the loss of all but one of her 20 to 25 crew.
Wild Hunter	United States	The ship was driven ashore on Tybee Island, Georgia. She was on a voyage from Savannah, Georgia to Liverpool. She was refloated and resumed her voyage.
Wooloomooloo	United Kingdom	The ship caught fire at New Orleans. She was on a voyage from New Orleans to Havre de Grâce.
Unnamed	United Kingdom	The schooner became disabled in the Atlantic Ocean in mid-October when all but two of her crew were washed overboard. She was discovered on 16 November by the brigantine Wacoma (United States), which put her captain and a crew member on board with the intention of taking the schooner in to Queenstown. The schooner was on a voyuage from the Newfoundland Colony to Grimsby, Lincolnshire.
