= Cape Bol'shoy Dugandzha =

Headland in Khabarovsk Krai, Russia

Cape Bol'shoy Dugandzha Мыс Большой Дуганджа (Russian) Eagle Point
- Cape
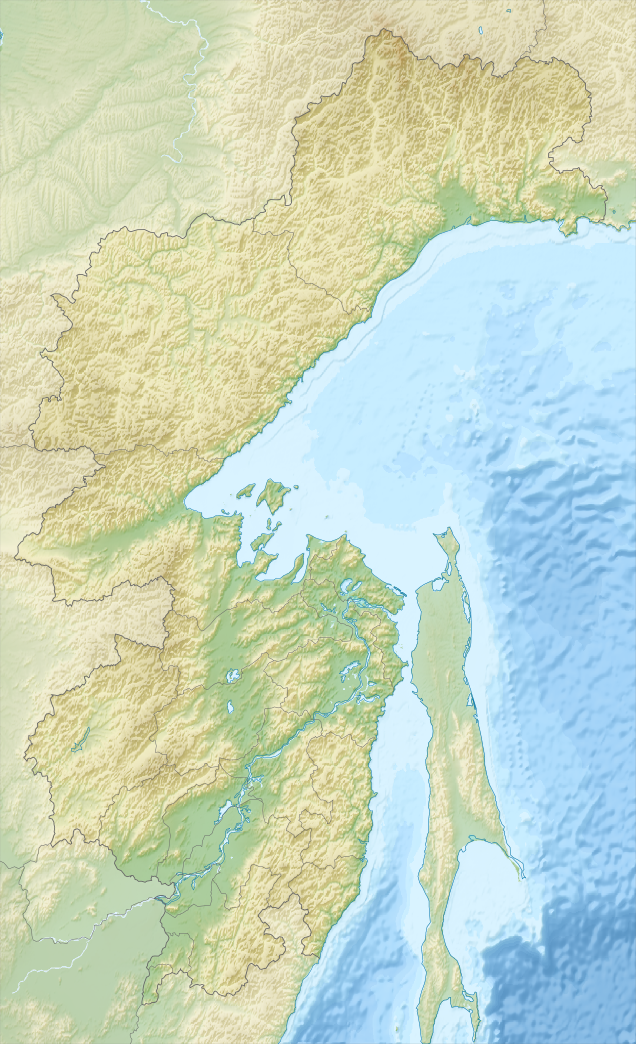
- Coordinates: 54°38′N 136°50′E
- Location: Khabarovsk Krai, Russia
- Offshore water bodies: Sea of Okhotsk

Area
  - Total: Russian Far East

Cape Bol'shoy Dugandzha (Russian: Мыс Большой Дуганджа, Mys Bol'shoy Dugandzha, "Big Dugandzha Cape") is a headland in Khabarovsk Krai, Russia.

== Geography ==
It is a steep-to cape lying in the western Sea of Okhotsk near the Shantar Islands, east of Cape Malaya Dugandzha ("Little Dugandzha Cape") and west of Ptichy Island. It rises to a height of 250 m (820 ft) and forms the eastern point of Lyutsun Bay and the western point of Tugur Bay.

== History ==
American whaleships cruised for bowhead whales off the cape between 1855 and 1889. They called it Eagle Point, because it was "inhabited only by eagles, which are very numerous". They often passed between the cape and Ptichy Island when sailing to and from Uda Bay and Tugur Bay; they also anchored under it to obtain shelter from gales and strong winds.
