= Carabus hummelii vladobydovi =

Scientific classification
- Domain: Eukaryota
- Kingdom: Animalia
- Phylum: Arthropoda
- Class: Insecta
- Order: Coleoptera
- Suborder: Adephaga
- Family: Carabidae
- Genus: Carabus
- Species: C. hummelii
- Subspecies: C. h. vladobydovi

Trinomial name
- Carabus hummelii vladobydovi Obydov, 2007

Subspecies of beetle

Carabus hummelii vladobydovi is a subspecies of ground beetle in the subfamily Carabinae that is endemic to Russia, where it can only be found in Primorsky Krai. The species are brownish-red coloured.
