= Shantar Islands National Park =

- Russian: Шантарские острова
- IUCN category II (national park)
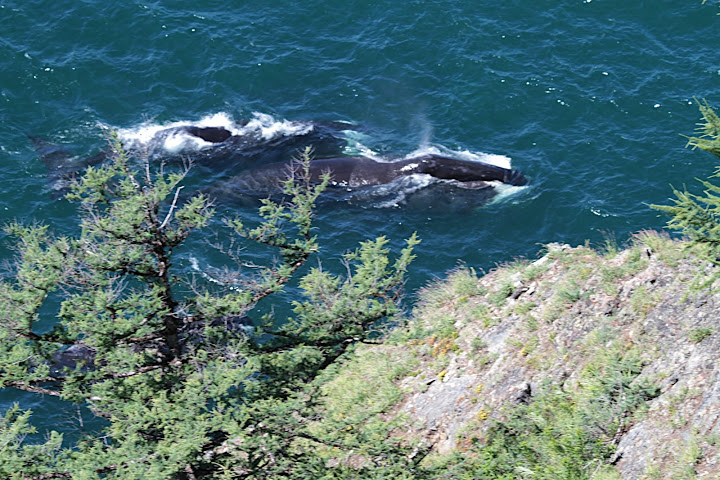
- Bowhead whales in Lingholm Strait

- Location within Russia
- Location: Khabarovsk Krai
- Nearest city: Chumikan
- Coordinates: 55°00′N 137°30′E
- Area: 515,500 hectares (1,273,828 acres; 5,155 km^{2}; 1,990 sq mi) (274,484 hectares of which is marine)
- Established: 2013
- Governing body: FGBU "Shantar Islands"

Shantar Islands National Park (Russian: Шантарские острова (национальный парк)) covers both the terrestrial and maritime surroundings of the Shantar Islands, a group of 15 currently uninhabited islands that lie close to the coast of Khabarovsk Krai, in the Sea of Okhotsk in the Russian Far East. Most of the islands are moderately mountainous, with rugged cliffs; the highest point is 720 m (2,375 ft). The area around the islands is an important area for marine mammals - including Steller Sea Lions, seals, and many species of cetacean (gray, bowhead, minke, beluga, and killer whale) - plus spawning salmon and very large colonies of birds. The park was formerly a state nature reserve (established in 1999), but re-established as a federal national park in 2013 with the stated purpose of protecting the habitat of vulnerable species (and in particular guarding against poaching), and supporting the scientific study and ecological tourism of the area. The Shantar Islands are located in the Tuguro-Chumikansky District of Khabarovsk Krai. The park is overseen by the Russian Ministry of Natural Resources.

== Topography ==
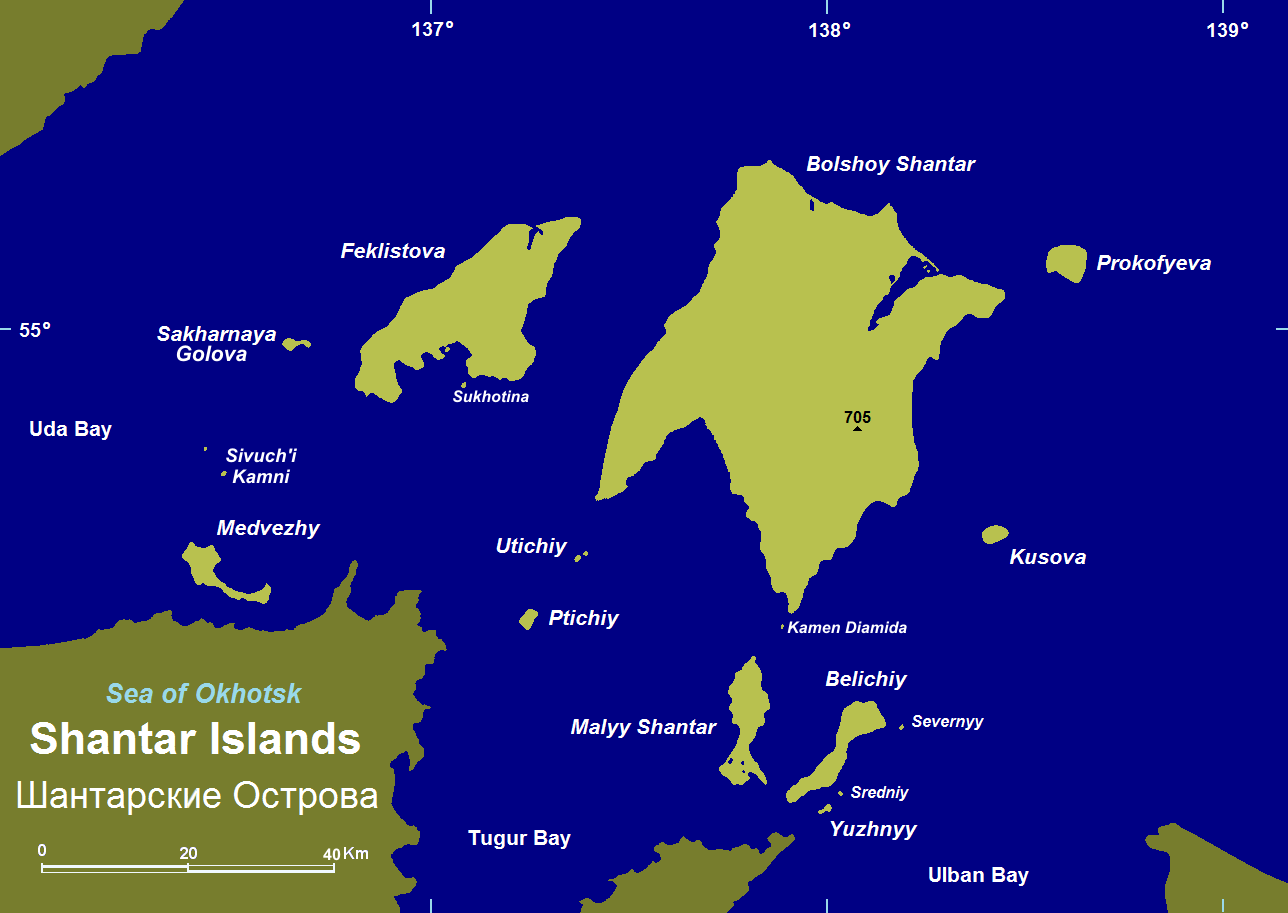
Shantar Islands east of Uda Bay. Park boundaries are the light green islands, plus maritime zone out to 5 km

The Shantar Islands lie on the eastern side of Uda Bay; until 9,000-10,000 years ago they were connected, which explains why there the floral ecosystem of the island contains no endemic species. Of the 15 islands and many rocks that rise above the surface, two make up 75% of the terrestrial area of the park: Bolshoy Shantar Island (176,600 hectares (436,000 acres), or 30x45 miles in size), and Feklistova Island (37,200 hectares (92,000 acres)) which is about 20 km (12 mi) west of Bolshoy Shantar. Uda Bay separates the main islands from the coast to the west. Tides reach 5 – 8 m (16.5 - 26.2 ft), and currents around the island are very strong. Fog is frequent.

== Climate and ecoregion ==
The climate of Shantar Islands is more severe than that of the Okhotsk Sea in general. The prevailing northeast winds push ice floes into the coast around Shantar, leaving only 2–3 months per year of ice-free water. The official climate designation for the Shantar area is "Subarctic climate" (Köppen climate classification Dwc), with long, cold winters and short cool summers.

Bolshoy Shantar Island (2014), (Russia)

Climate chart (precipitation, max. and min. temperature)
J	F	M	A	M	J	J	A	S	O	N	D
8 −17 −28	16 −13 −23	25 −4 −18	27 3 −8	26 9 0	25 17 4	150 16 9	81 20 8	21 16 4	40 5 −4	23 −4 −12	74 −13 −23
- █ Average max. and min. temperatures in °C
- █ Precipitation totals in mm
- Source: Tokyo Climate Center
Imperial conversion
J	F	M	A	M	J	J	A	S	O	N	D
0.3 1 −19	0.6 10 −10	1 25 0	1.1 37 18	1 48 32	1 62 38	5.9 61 49	3.2 67 47	0.8 61 40	1.6 40 24	0.9 26 10	2.9 10 −9
- █ Average max. and min. temperatures in °F
- █ Precipitation totals in inches

The maritime ecoregion of Shantar Islands is "North Temperate Indo-Pacific / Sea of Okhotsk", (WWF Maritime Ecoregion #204), characterized by cool but fertile waters that support enormous fisheries and bird centers. Currents keep the areas near the coast cooler than areas to the east; the variety and proximity of temperature support the high levels of biodiversity.

== Plants ==
The larger islands are covered with dark coniferous forests, primarily Siberian spruce, larch, cedar, and birch. There are no endemic plant species on the islands, as they are close to, and until relatively recently connected to, the mainland.

== Animals ==
Park rules will protect the maritime environment, with fishing prohibited out to 1–3 miles from the coast to cover salmon spawning areas. Terrestrial mammals include brown bear, caribou, red fox, sable, river otter, and ringed seals. Over 240 species of birds live on or migrate through the Shantars, including the endangered species such as the Blakiston's fish owl and Steller's sea eagle.

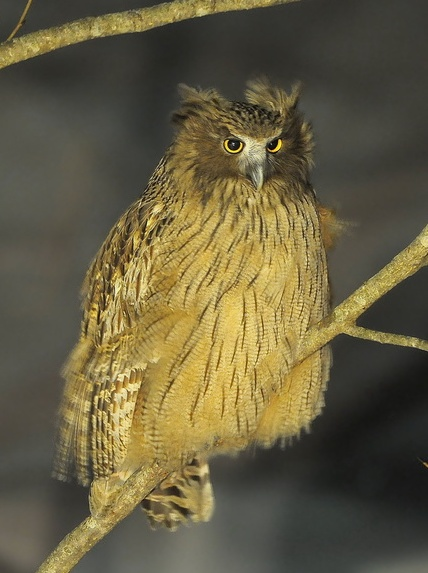
Blakiston's fish owl,
the largest species of owl

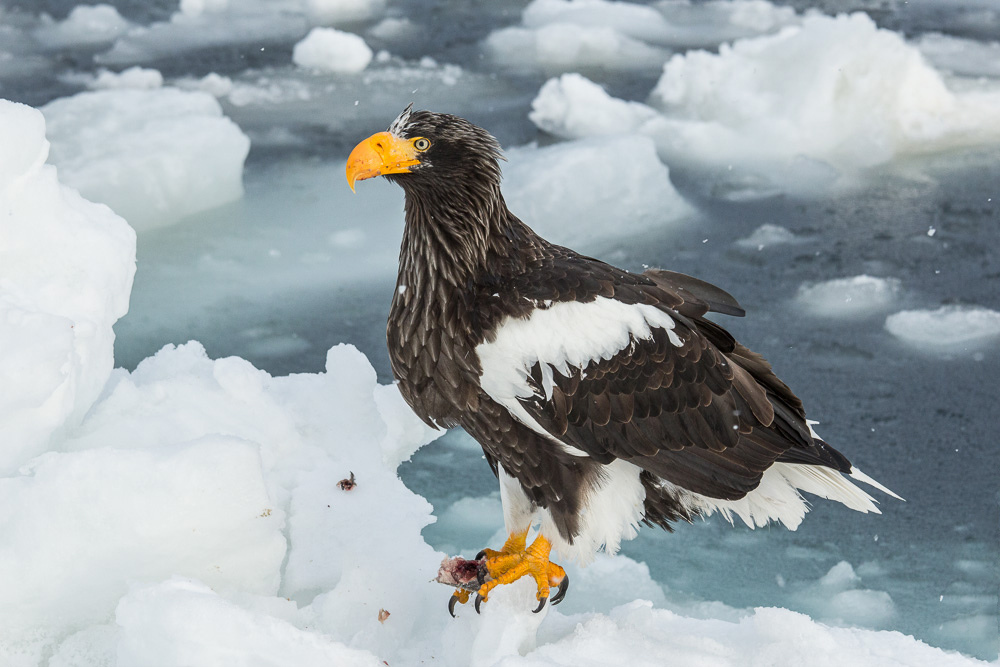
Steller's sea eagle

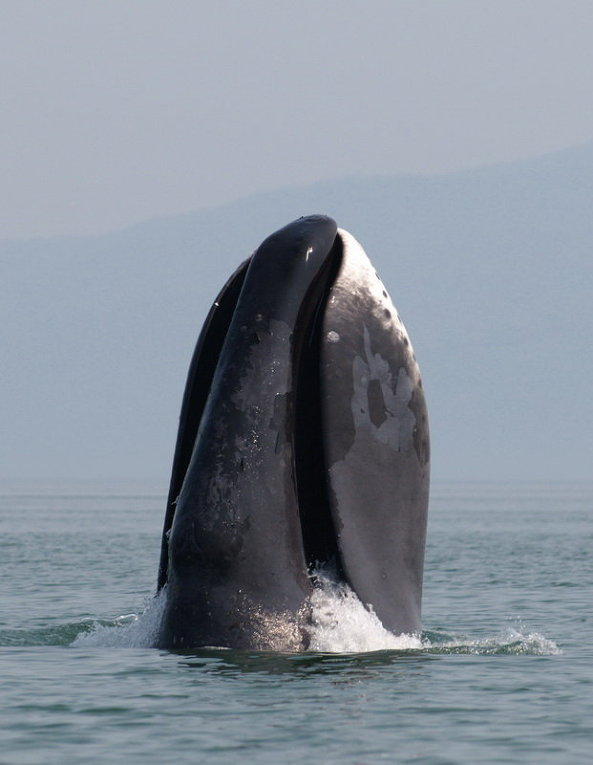
Bowhead whale showing head

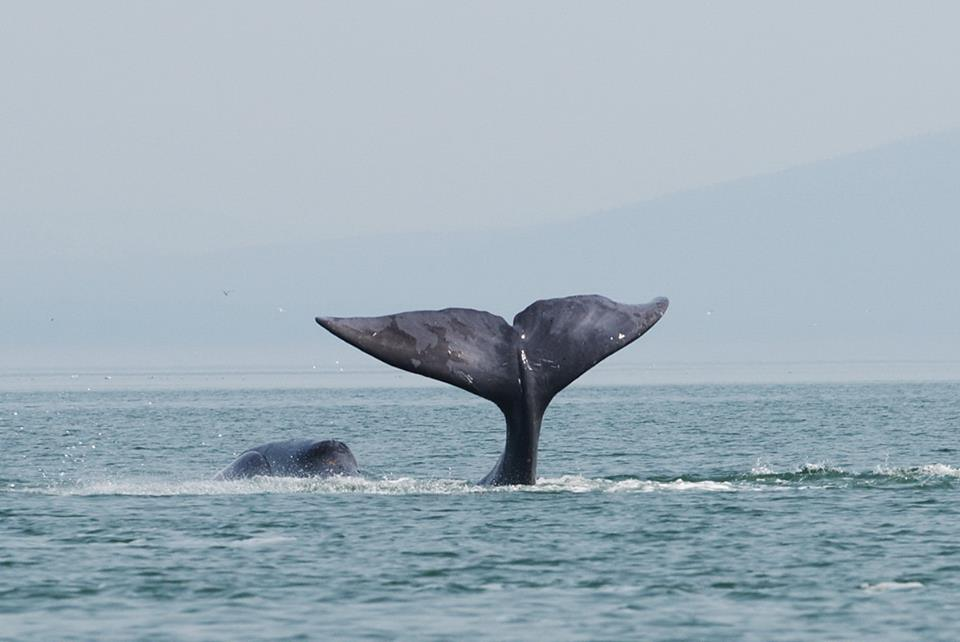
Bowhead whale tail-slapping

== History ==
The islands have a long history of visits by humans for use as bases for fur trapping, whaling, fishing, and hunting. American whaleships hunted bowhead whales around the islands between 1852 and 1907. Logging has occurred in past, and the islands are in a region with potential mineral reserves - all adding pressure on the site for economic use. The islands were set aside as a state nature reserve in 1999, and except for a meteorological station and occasional scientific camps, are now uninhabited. In 2017, further protections were accepted to divide the area into several zones and will completely ban any economical activities within certain area(s).

== Tourism ==
The park is still being established with rules, infrastructure and zoning being developed. Ecotourism, education, and scientific study are all stated in the plans for the territory. There are commercial tour groups operating in the area.

== See also ==
- Protected areas of Russia
