= Carabus hummelii middendorfi =

Scientific classification
- Domain: Eukaryota
- Kingdom: Animalia
- Phylum: Arthropoda
- Class: Insecta
- Order: Coleoptera
- Suborder: Adephaga
- Family: Carabidae
- Genus: Carabus
- Species: C. hummelii
- Subspecies: C. h. middendorfi

Trinomial name
- Carabus hummelii middendorfi Menetries, 1851

Subspecies of beetle

Carabus hummelii middendorfi is a subspecies of ground beetle that is endemic to Russia, where it can only be found on Bolshoy Shantar Island in Primorsky Krai. They are wooden brown coloured with black pronotum.
