= Utichy Island =

Island in Sea of Okhotsk, Russia

Coordinates: 54°41′N 137°12′E

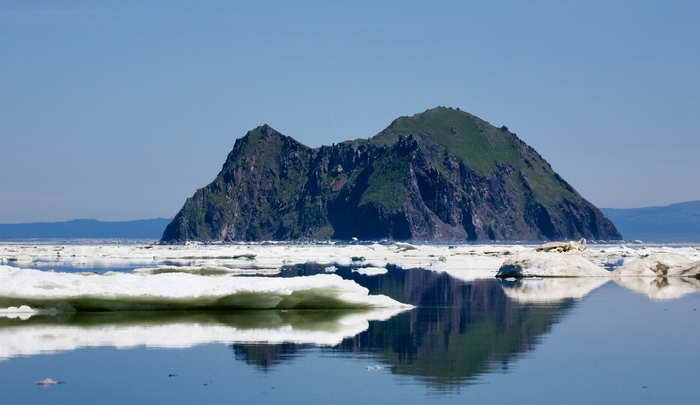
Utichy surrounded by sea ice.

Utichy Island (Russian: Утичий остров, Ostrov Utichy) is a small island in the western Sea of Okhotsk. It is one of the Shantar Islands. It lies southwest of the southwest point of Bolshoy Shantar Island and northeast of Ptichy Island.

== Fauna ==
In the summer, a large colony of spectacled guillemot and a small nesting colony of thick-billed murre reside on the island.

== History ==
American whaleships targeting bowhead whales cruised off Utichy from the 1850s to the 1880s. They called it Little Stinker Island. Along with Ptichy, it was considered one of the Stinker Islands.

On August 1, 1981, an Aeroflot Ilyushin Il-14M, flying in poor visibility, crashed into the southwest side of Utichy, killing all 11 people on board.
