= Kusova =

Kusova Кусова
- Island
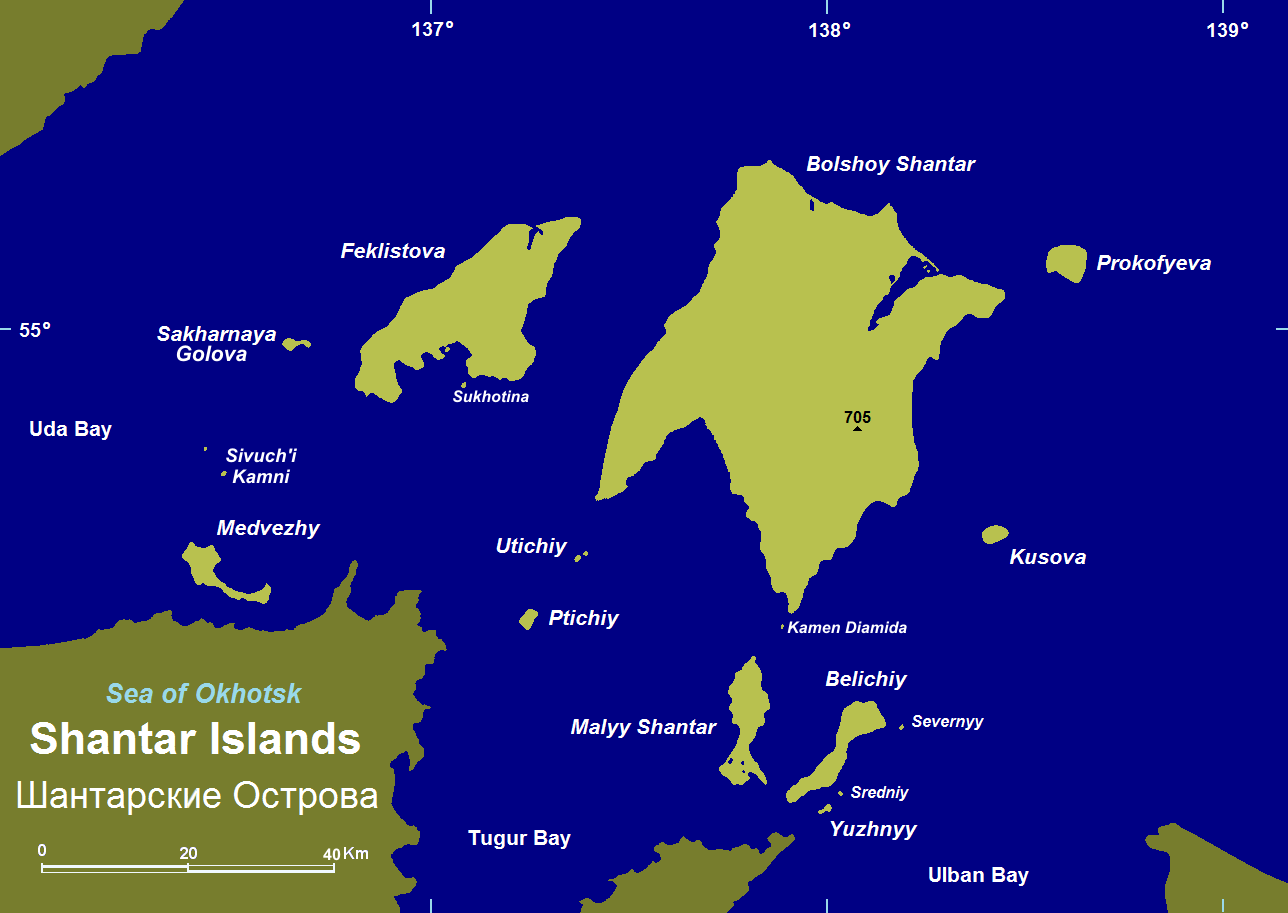
- Map of the Shantar Islands.

- Location within Khabarovsk Krai
- Coordinates: 54°42′45″N 138°12′55″E
- Country: Russian Federation
- Federal subject: Far Eastern Federal District
- Krai: Khabarovsk Krai
- Elevation: 633 m (2,077 ft)

Kusova or Kusov Island (Russian: остров Кусова; Ostrov Kusova) is a small island in the Shantar Islands in the Sea of Okhotsk. It lies southeast of Bolshoy Shantar Island.

== Geography ==
The island lies towards the eastern end of the group. It is 4.2 km (2.6 mi) in length, with a maximum width of 2.6 km (1.6 mi). It is quite high, rising abruptly to a height of 633 m (2,076 ft).

Kusova Island is separated from Bolshoy Shantar Island to the northwest by a 14 km (8.7 mi) wide sound.

== History ==
Kusova was frequented by American whaleships targeting bowhead whales between 1853 and 1867. They simply called it Round Island. They would anchor off the island and send men ashore to obtain wood.
