= Carabus hummelii stolidus =

Scientific classification
- Kingdom: Animalia
- Phylum: Arthropoda
- Class: Insecta
- Order: Coleoptera
- Suborder: Adephaga
- Family: Carabidae
- Genus: Carabus
- Species: C. hummelii
- Subspecies: C. h. stolidus

Trinomial name
- Carabus hummelii stolidus Lapouge, 1924

Subspecies of beetle

Carabus hummelii stolidus is a subspecies of ground beetle in the subfamily Carabinae that is endemic to Russia.
