= Carabus hummelii hummelii =

Scientific classification
- Domain: Eukaryota
- Kingdom: Animalia
- Phylum: Arthropoda
- Class: Insecta
- Order: Coleoptera
- Suborder: Adephaga
- Family: Carabidae
- Genus: Carabus
- Species: C. hummelii
- Subspecies: C. h. hummelii

Trinomial name
- Carabus hummelii hummelii Fischer von Waldheim, 1823

Synonyms
- Carabus burnaschewi Dejean, 1826 "Siberia"; Carabus cyaneoviolaceus Motschulsky, 1844 "Dahuria, Irkutsk"; Carabus obversus Motschulsky, 1846 Nerchinsk(LT); Carabus ochoticus Mannerheim, 1852 Far East: "Port Ajan"; Carabus multistriatus Lapouge, 1924, nec Motschulsky, 1865; Carabus densestriatus Csiki, 1927; nom.pro multistriatus Lapouge

Subspecies of beetle

Carabus hummelii hummelii is a subspecies of ground beetle from family Carabidae, found in Mongolia and Russia. They are black coloured with blue pronotum. The male size of the subspecies is 26 millimetres (1.0 in), while their females are 27 millimetres (1.1 in) in length. Some males can be as small as 23 millimetres (0.91 in).
