= Carabus hummelii pusongensis =

Scientific classification
- Kingdom: Animalia
- Phylum: Arthropoda
- Class: Insecta
- Order: Coleoptera
- Suborder: Adephaga
- Family: Carabidae
- Genus: Carabus
- Species: C. hummelii
- Subspecies: C. h. pusongensis

Trinomial name
- Carabus hummelii pusongensis Imura, 1993

Synonyms
- Carabus gustavi Shilenkov, 1996; Carabus wangxingensis Deuve & Li, 1998

Subspecies of beetle

Carabus hummelii pusongensis is a subspecies of ground beetle in the subfamily Carabinae that can be found in China, North Korea and Russia. They are either black or green coloured, with both sexes are 28–30 millimetres (1.1–1.2 in) in length.
