= Carabus hummelii nevelskii =

Scientific classification
- Domain: Eukaryota
- Kingdom: Animalia
- Phylum: Arthropoda
- Class: Insecta
- Order: Coleoptera
- Suborder: Adephaga
- Family: Carabidae
- Genus: Carabus
- Species: C. hummelii
- Subspecies: C. h. nevelskii

Trinomial name
- Carabus hummelii nevelskii Shilenkov, 1996

Subspecies of beetle

Carabus hummelii nevelskii is a subspecies of ground beetle in the subfamily Carabinae that is endemic to Sakhalin, Russia. They are either black or brown coloured, and are 23 millimetres (0.91 in) in length.
