= Carabus hummelii tristiculus =

Scientific classification
- Domain: Eukaryota
- Kingdom: Animalia
- Phylum: Arthropoda
- Class: Insecta
- Order: Coleoptera
- Suborder: Adephaga
- Family: Carabidae
- Genus: Carabus
- Species: C. hummelii
- Subspecies: C. h. tristiculus

Trinomial name
- Carabus hummelii tristiculus Kraatz, 1879

Synonyms
- Carabus gracilentus Kraatz, 1881

Subspecies of beetle

Carabus hummelii tristiculus is a subspecies of ground beetle in the subfamily Carabinae that is endemic to Russia, where it can only be found in Maritime province. The species are bluish-black coloured.
