= Prokofyeva Island =

Island in Sea of Okhotsk

Prokofyeva
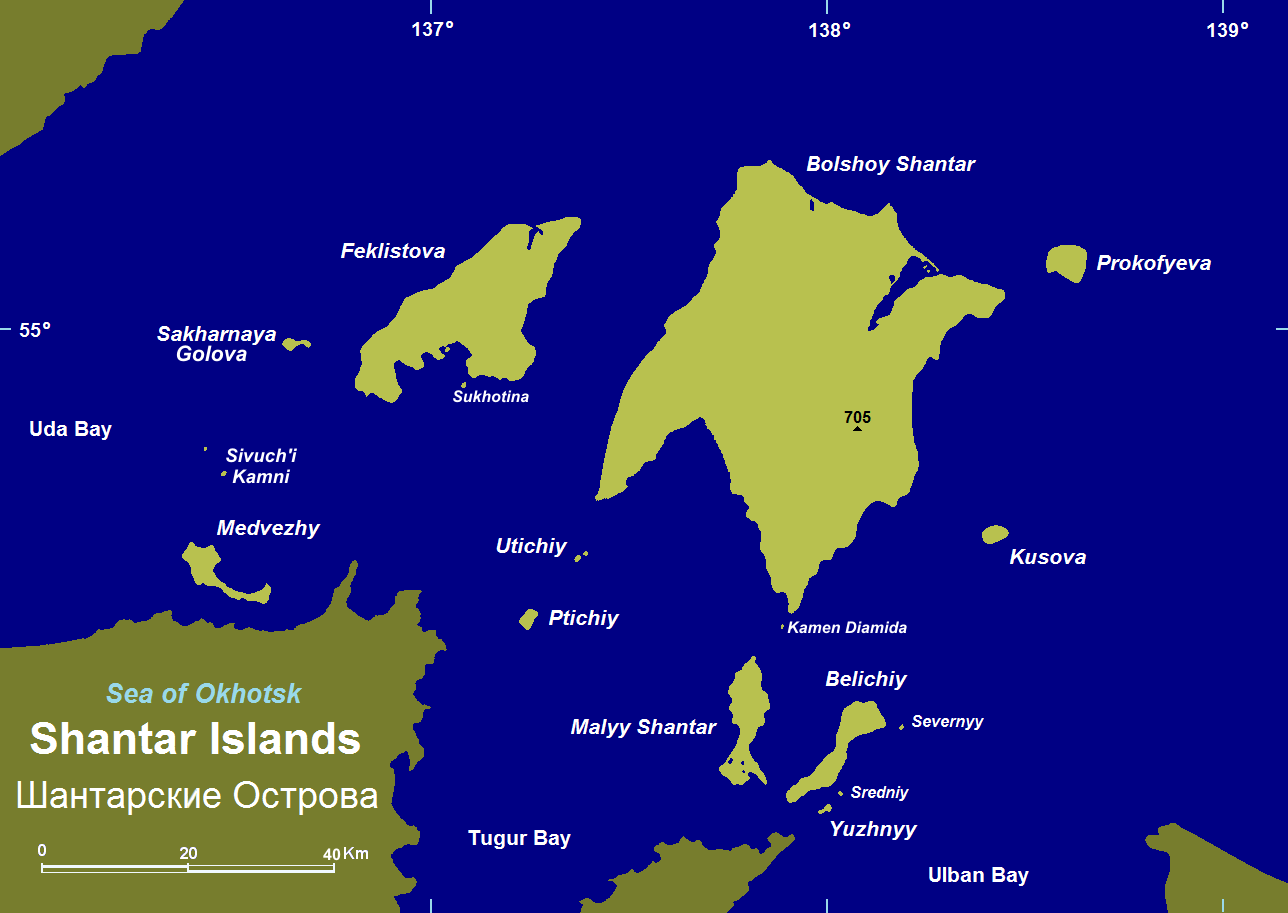
- The Shantar Islands in the Sea of Okhotsk

- Location within Khabarovsk Krai

Geography
- Location: Sea of Okhotsk
- Coordinates: 55°04′N 138°23′E
- Archipelago: Shantar Islands

Administration
- Russia
- Federal Subject: Khabarovsk Krai

Prokofyeva (Russian: Ostrov Prokofyeva) is a small island in the Sea of Okhotsk. It is one of the Shantar Islands. It lies to the northeast of Bolshoy Shantar Island.

== History ==
Prokofyeva was frequented by American whaleships cruising for bowhead whales between 1855 and 1885.

== Fauna ==
In the spring and summer there is a small nesting colony of thick-billed murre on the island.
