= Ptichy Island (Shantar Islands) =

Ptichy Island Остров Птичий
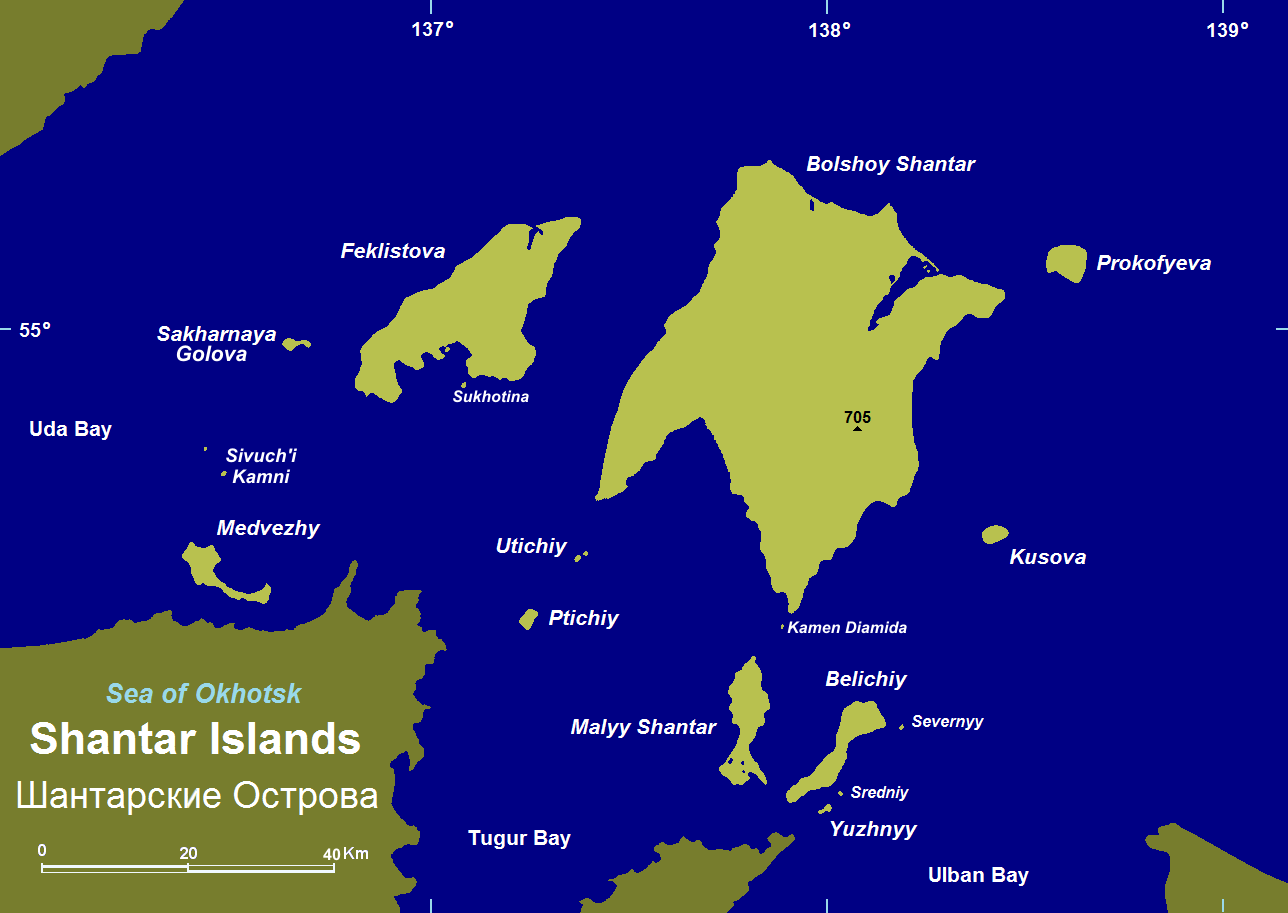
- The Shantar Islands in the Sea of Okhotsk

- Location within Khabarovsk Krai

Geography
- Location: Sea of Okhotsk
- Coordinates: 54°35′59″N 137°04′47″E
- Archipelago: Shantar Islands
- Length: 1.6 km (0.99 mi)
- Highest elevation: 290 m (950 ft)

Administration
- Russia
- Federal Subject: Khabarovsk Krai

Demographics
- Population: 0

Ptichy Island (Russian: Остров Птичий, Ostrov Ptichy, meaning Bird Island) is a small island in the Sea of Okhotsk.

== Geography ==
Ptichy Island is one of the Shantar Islands. It lies between the southwest point of Bolshoy Shantar and Cape Bol'shoy Dugandzha on the mainland. It is a little over 1.6 km (1 mi) in length and rises to a height of 290 m (951 ft).

== History ==
Between 1857 and 1889, American whaleships cruised for bowhead whales off Ptichiy. They called it Big Stinker or just Stinker Island, "on account of the dead whales drifting along there from the ice". Along with Utichy, it was considered one of the Stinker Islands. Ships also anchored under it during strong winds and boat crews spent the night on the island after cruising for whales all day.

== Fauna ==
In the summer there is a large colony of spectacled guillemots on the island, as well as a smaller nesting colony of thick-billed murres.
