= Reyneke Island (Sea of Okhotsk) =

Reyneke Island Остров Рейнеке
- Island
- Location within Khabarovsk Krai
- Coordinates: 54°19′N 139°47′E
- Country: Russia
- Federal Subject: Khabarovsk Krai
- Elevation: 257 m (843 ft)

Population
  - Total: 0

Reyneke Island (Russian: Остров Рейнеке; Ostrov Reyneke) is an island in the Sea of Okhotsk, administratively part of Khabarovsk Krai, Russia. The uninhabited island lies 45 kilometres (28 miles) to the south-east of Menshikov Island, and has an area of approximately 7 kilometres (4.3 miles) in length and a maximum width of 1.6 kilometres (0.99 miles). It is a mountainous island located close to a headland of the continental shore, separated from mainland Khabarovsk Krai by a 4.5 kilometres (2.8 miles) wide sound.

== History ==
Reyneke Island was named after Mikhail Reyneke, Vice Admiral of the Imperial Russian Navy and an early hydrographer of the Russian Hydrographic Service in the region.

American whaleships cruised for bowhead whales off the island in the 1850s and 1860s. They called it Duck Island, because ships went there to shoot "ducks" (though whalemen applied the term loosely to a variety of seabirds). They also went to the island to get wood and water.
