= Lebyazhya Bay =

Bay in the Sea of Okhotsk

Coordinates: 54°57′N 136°49′E

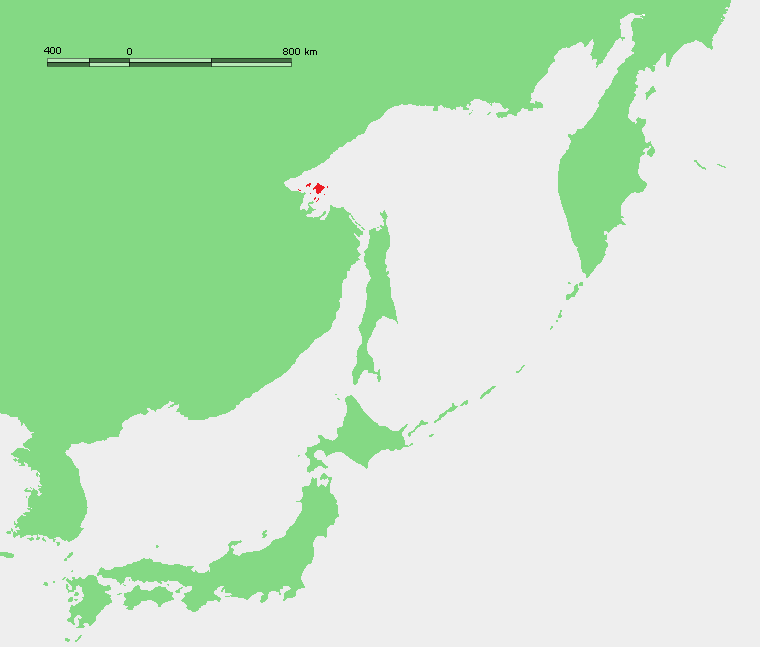
Location map of the Shantar Islands in the Sea of Okhotsk

Lebyazhya Bay (Russian: Лебя́жья губа́) is a small bay that indents the south side of Feklistova Island, one of the Shantar Islands, in the western Sea of Okhotsk. Its entrance is 11.3 kilometers (7.0 mi) wide and 5.6 kilometers (3.5 mi) deep. There are three small bays at its head: Enegelma Road to the west, Soboleva to the north, and Rosseta to the east. A small island, Sukhotina, lies to its southeast. In the spring and summer it is host to a small nesting colony of thick-billed murre. A number of streams of fresh water flow down the hills into the bay. Spring tides rise 6.5 meters (21 ft) while neaps rise 2.4 meters (7 ft 10 in).

== History ==
Between 1852 and 1889, American whaleships anchored in the bay to stow down or boil oil, flense whales, and obtain wood and water or shelter from storms. They called it Feklistoff Harbor, Bloomer Bay, or Harbor Bay. Ships typically anchored in five to nine fathoms of water, usually in Soboleva Bay. As many as forty-two ships could be anchored in Lebyazhya Bay at one time. Though ships mainly anchored in the bay to get wood and water, boats were also sent ashore to catch trout, collect berries, or to shoot ducks or bears. Although these ships visited the Shantar region to hunt bowhead whales, they seldom chased whales in the bay itself. Men that had been killed by whales or died of disease were buried ashore. Two ships were condemned in the bay, the brig Tarquina (210 tons), of Honolulu, under Captain Weaver, and the bark Columbus (344 tons), of New London, under Captain Edwards. The former had been damaged in the ice in June 1856 while the latter was wrecked in Tugur Bay in August 1858. Both were sold; one of them was also pilfered. The schooner E. L. Frost (141 tons), of Honolulu, was left in the bay for the winter of 1860–1861. She served as tender to the bark Benjamin Rush (385 tons), also of Honolulu, during the seasons of 1860 and 1861.
