= Menshikov Island =

Island in the country of Russia

Menshikov Island Остров Меньшикова
- Island
- Location within Khabarovsk Krai
- Coordinates: 54°36′N 139°14′E
- Country: Russian Federation
- Federal subject: Far Eastern Federal District
- Krai: Khabarovsk Krai
- Elevation: 349 m (1,145 ft)

Menshikov Island (Russian: Остров Меньшикова; Ostrov Men'shikova) is an island in the Sea of Okhotsk located east of the Shantar Islands.

== Geography ==
Menshikov Island lies 71 kilometres (44 mi) to the east of the eastern shore of Kusov Island, the easternmost island of the Shantar group. It is 7 kilometres (4.3 mi) long and has a maximum width of 1.6 kilometres (0.99 mi). It was named after one of the ships of the 1849-1855 Amur Expedition, which had been named after Admiral A.S. Menshikov.

Administratively this island belongs to the Khabarovsk Krai of the Russian Federation.

== History ==
American whaleships sent whaleboats to the island to collect eggs from seabirds. They called it Bird Island.
