= Yakshin Bay =

Bight in the Sea of Okhotsk

Coordinates: 54°48′N 137°25′E

Yakshin Bay (Russian: Guba Yakshina) is a small bight in the western Sea of Okhotsk. It is 29 km (about 18 mi) wide and indents the southwest side of Bolshoy Shantar Island. The bay is entered between Capes Raduzhnyy to the west and Filippa to the east. The Yakshin River flows into the head of the bay. There is ice in the bay from December to July. Tides rise 4.9 m (16 ft) at springs, with the flood current flowing in a counterclockwise direction round the bay and the ebb in the reverse direction. These tidal currents may reach 3.5 to 4 knots near the entrance of the bay but are less than 2 knots at its head.

== History ==
American whaleships targeting bowhead whales visited Yakshin Bay from 1858 to 1889. They called it Big Shantar Bight or the Forks of Big Shantar. Ships anchored in the bay to send boats out to cruise for whales, to get wood and water or seek shelter from strong winds, and to smoke the ship for rats. Boats were also sent ashore to collect berries and gather mussels and clams.

The rusting remains of a 19th-century whaling station (perhaps American), including a steam engine and a meat grinder, exist at the head of the bay.
