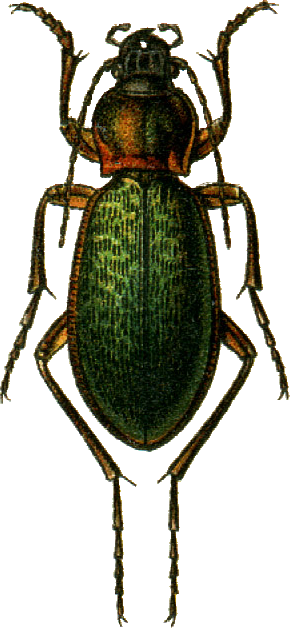
- Carabus hummeli

Scientific classification
- Domain: Eukaryota
- Kingdom: Animalia
- Phylum: Arthropoda
- Class: Insecta
- Order: Coleoptera
- Suborder: Adephaga
- Family: Carabidae
- Genus: Carabus
- Species: C. hummelii

Binomial name
- Carabus hummelii Fischer von Waldheim, 1823

Synonyms
- Carabus hummeli

= Carabus hummelii =

Species of beetle

Carabus hummelii is a species of ground beetle in the family Carabidae. It is found in China, North Korea, Russia, and Mongolia.

== Subspecies ==
These 14 subspecies belong to the species Carabus hummelii:

- Carabus hummelii bonoi Obydov, 2006 (Russia)
- Carabus hummelii chrysothorax Kraatz, 1886 (China, North Korea, and Russia)
- Carabus hummelii gaolinensis Obydov, 2008 (China)
- Carabus hummelii hummelii Fischer von Waldheim, 1823 (China, Mongolia, and Russia)
- Carabus hummelii jurgae Obydov, 1995 (Russia)
- Carabus hummelii middendorfi Ménétriés, 1851 (Russia)
- Carabus hummelii nevelskii Shilenkov, 1996 (Russia)
- Carabus hummelii pusongensis Imura, 1993 (China, North Korea, and Russia)
- Carabus hummelii putyatini Rapuzzi, 2012 (Russia)
- Carabus hummelii stolidus Lapouge, 1925 (Russia)
- Carabus hummelii suensoni Mandl, 1979 (China)
- Carabus hummelii tongnimensis Deuve & Li, 2008 (North Korea)
- Carabus hummelii tristiculus Kraatz, 1878 (Russia)
- Carabus hummelii zubatschiki Obydov & Saldaitis, 2008 (China)
