= Ptichy Island (Kamchatka Krai) =

- Island
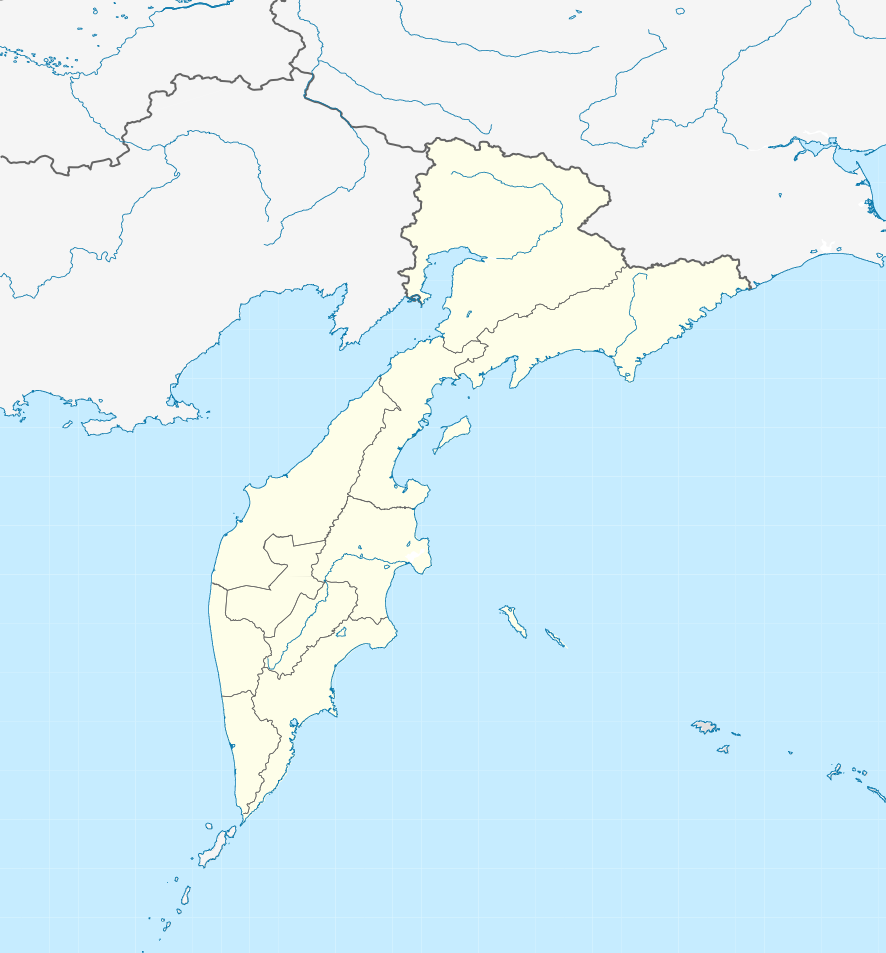
- Location within Kamchatka Krai
- Coordinates: 57°10′28″N 156°36′13″E
- Country: Russian Federation
- Federal subject: Far Eastern Federal District
- Krai: Kamchatka Krai
- Elevation: 53 m (174 ft)

Ptichy Island (Russian: Ostrov Ptichy, meaning 'Bird Island') is a small island in the Sea of Okhotsk. It lies close to the mainland off the western coast of the Kamchatka Peninsula.

== Geography ==
It is a 0.8 km long and 0.35 km wide coastal island. It is located off a headland in the northeastern Sea of Okhotsk, separated from the continental shore by a 7.6 km wide sound.

Administratively Ptichy Island belongs to the Kamchatka Krai.
