= Shantar Islands =

Shantar Islands Шантарские острова
- Island group
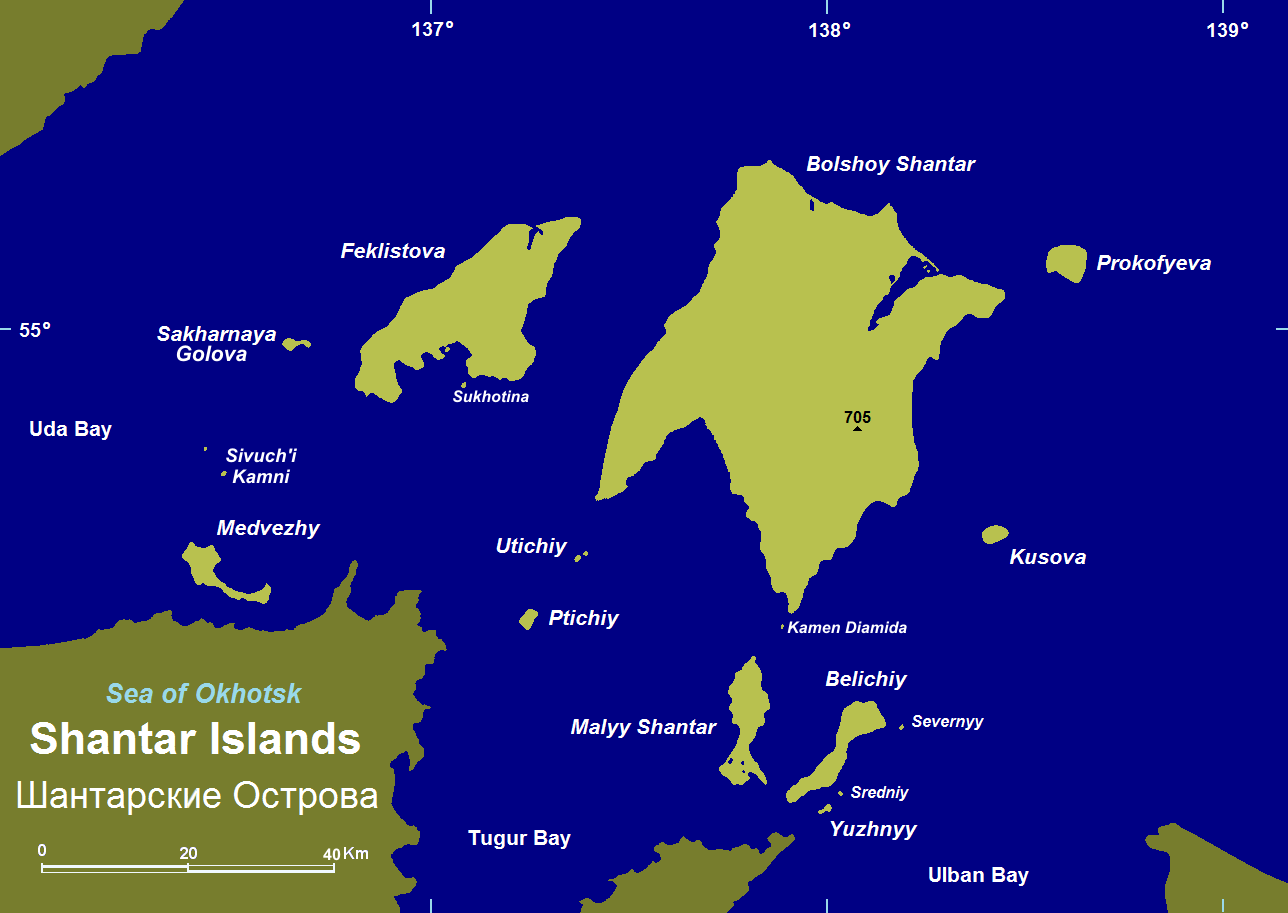
- Map of the Shantar Islands.

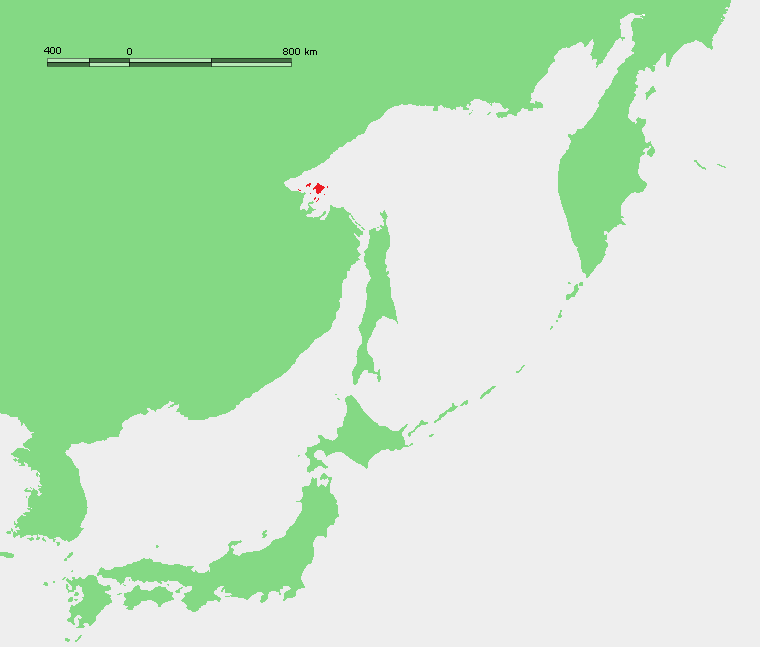
- Location of the Shantar Islands in the Sea of Okhotsk.
- Country: Russia
- Krai: Khabarovsk Krai
- District: Tuguro-Chumikansky District
- Elevation: 720 m (2,360 ft)

The Shantar Islands (Russian: Шантарские острова, romanized: Shantarskiye ostrova) are a group of fifteen islands located off the northwestern shore of the Sea of Okhotsk east of Uda Bay and north of Academy Bay. Most of the islands have rugged cliffs, but they are of moderate height; the highest point in the island group is 720 metres. The name of the island group has its origins in the Nivkh language from the word ч’андь č’and’ meaning "to be white".

The islands are currently uninhabited.

== Geography ==
The island group is administered by Russia as part of Khabarovsk Krai.

=== Islands ===
- Bolshoy Shantar Island. The largest island in the Shantar group, with an area of 1790 km^{2}. It is about 72 km in length and 49 km in width. It has a large brackish lake (Lake Bol'shoe) in its northern end which is connected to the sea through a narrow passage. Smelts (Hypomesus japonicus and olidus) are found in this lake.
- Feklistova Island, with an area of 372 km^{2}.
- Malyy Shantar Island, with an area of 100 km^{2}.
- Medvezhy, located very close to the coast.
- Belichy, with an area of 70 km^{2}.
- Other islands include Prokofyeva, Sakharnaya Golova, Kusova, Ptichy, Utichy and Yuzhnyy.

== History ==
The Nivkh people populated the Shantar islands until the 1730s.

The first recorded exploration of the Shantar Islands was in April 1640, when Russian explorer Ivan Moskvitin allegedly sailed to the mouth of the Amur River with a group of Cossacks and spotted the Shantar Islands on the way back. Moskvitin reported his discoveries to Prince Shcherbatov, the Muscovite voivode in Tomsk. Based on Ivan Moskvitin's account, the first Russian map of the Far East was drawn in March 1642. The Shantar Islands were also explored by Russian surveyors between 1711 and 1725.

American whaleships cruised for bowhead whales around the Shantar Islands between 1852 and 1907. They anchored among the islands to send whaleboats into the bays to the south and west, including Uda, Tugur, and Ulban Bays. They sought shelter under Bolshoy Shantar, Medvezhy, Malyy Shantar, and Feklistova Islands from strong winds and gales as well as to obtain wood and water. At least four ships were wrecked on the islands: one on the Pinnacle Rocks, one on Medvezhy and two on Bolshoy Shantar during gales in October 1858 and August 1907.

At the end of 2013, the Shantar Islands National Park was created by Russian scientists and conservationists with support from WWF and several international organizations to protect the wildlife of the islands.

== Ecology ==
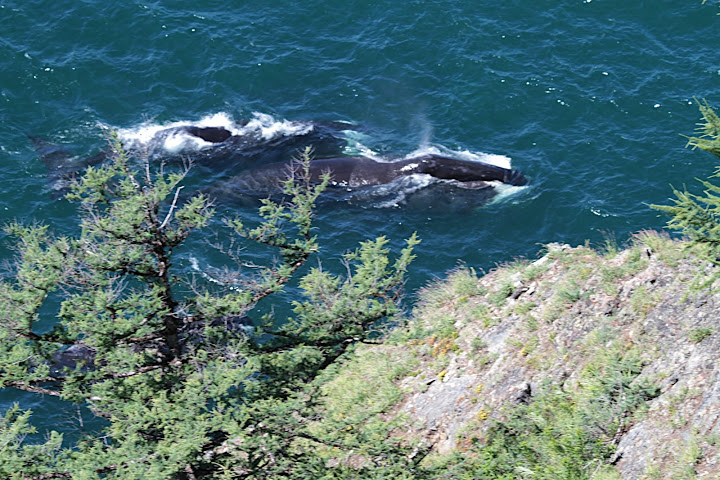
Bowhead whales swimming near a cliff in the Strait of Lindgolm (Russian: пролив Линдгольма)

There is no permanent population on the Shantar Islands, but they are often visited by commercial fishermen who use them as a base. Other economic activities undertaken on these islands are fur hunting and trapping as well as logging, which in the past were often done illegally. There are spruce forests on the largest islands. Other trees in the island taiga are the Siberian spruce, the Dahurian larch and the mountain pine.

There are many endangered birds on these islands, including the Blakiston's fish owl, osprey, black stork, red-necked grebe, gyrfalcon, solitary snipe, Steller's sea eagle and the Siberian grouse. In the spring and summer, a number of seabird species nest on the islands, including black-headed and slaty-backed gull, common and thick-billed murre, horned and tufted puffin, spectacled guillemot, Aleutian tern, long-billed murrelet, and pelagic cormorant.

The Kamchatka brown bear (Ursus arctos beringianus), sable and marten, caribou, red fox, and river otter are common on the Shantar Islands. Reindeer can be seen as well. Rivers on these islands are populated by sturgeon, salmon, trout, and various other fish.

The waters around these coastal islands are frozen for about eight months of the year on average. Pinnipeds (such as harbour seals, bearded seals, common seals, ribbon seals (on sea ice) and Steller sea lions), sea otters, and cetaceans such as minke whales, killer whales, and the critically endangered bowhead whales, western gray whales and belugas can be seen off the islands.

Although there is little visible evidence of human impact, the Shantar island ecosystem is under threat. One of the most severe threats to the environment of the Shantar Islands is a proposed tidal hydroelectric power station, which is currently on hold for lack of funds. Lack of restrictions on tourism and resorting is also a problem as the number of people visiting the islands is increasing in recent years.

== Nearby islands ==
- Menshikov Island (Остров Меньшикова; Ostrov Men'shikova) 54°36′N 139°14′E lies 71 km to the east of Kusov Island's eastern shore. It is 7 km long and has a maximum width of 1.6 km.
- Reyneke Island (Остров Рейнеке; Ostrov Reyneke) 54°19′N 139°47′E lies 45 km to the southeast of Menshikov Island. It is 7 km long and has a maximum width of 1.6 km. It is located close to a headland in the coast, separated from it by a 5 km wide sound. This island should not be confused with Reyneke Island close to Russky Island in the Vladivostok Bay.

== See also ==
- Bowhead whale
