= Feklistova Island =

Feklistova Остров Феклистова
- Island
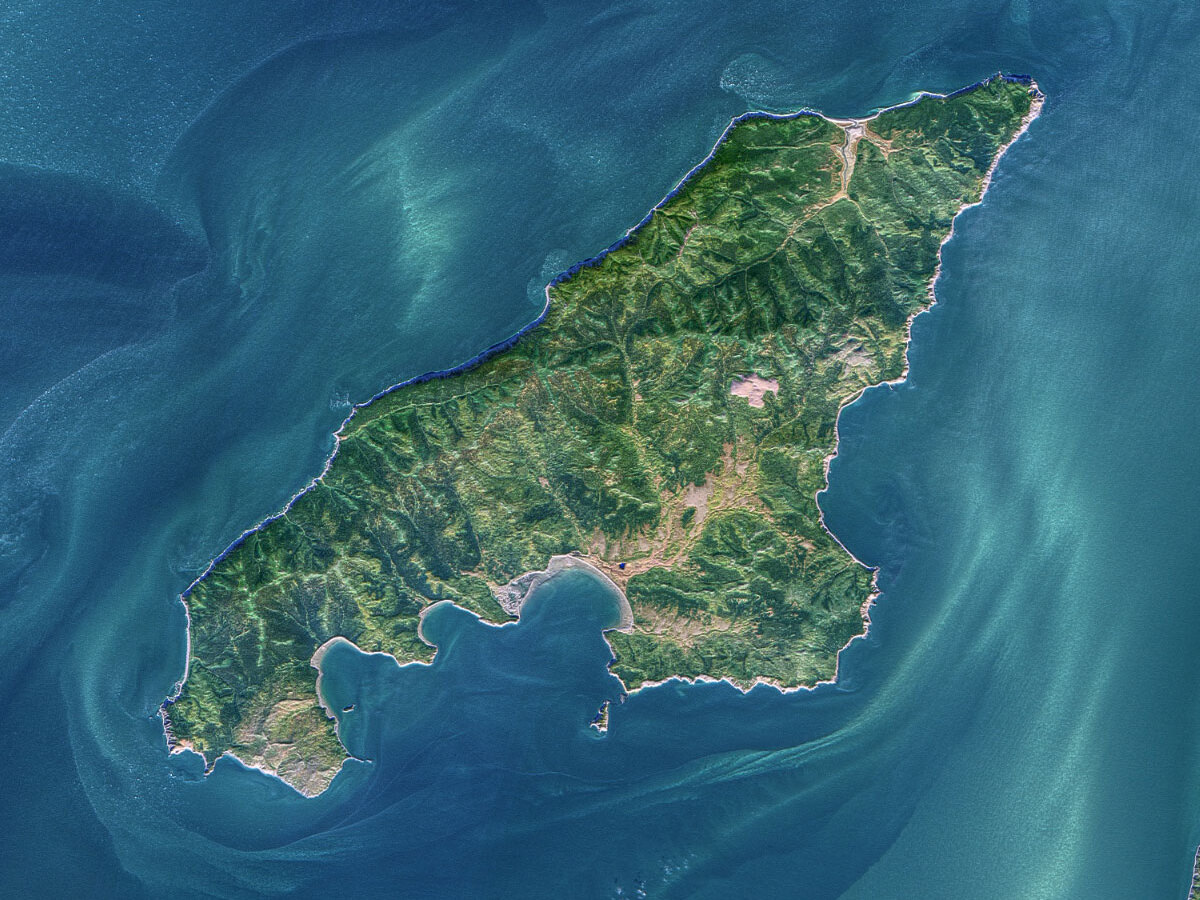

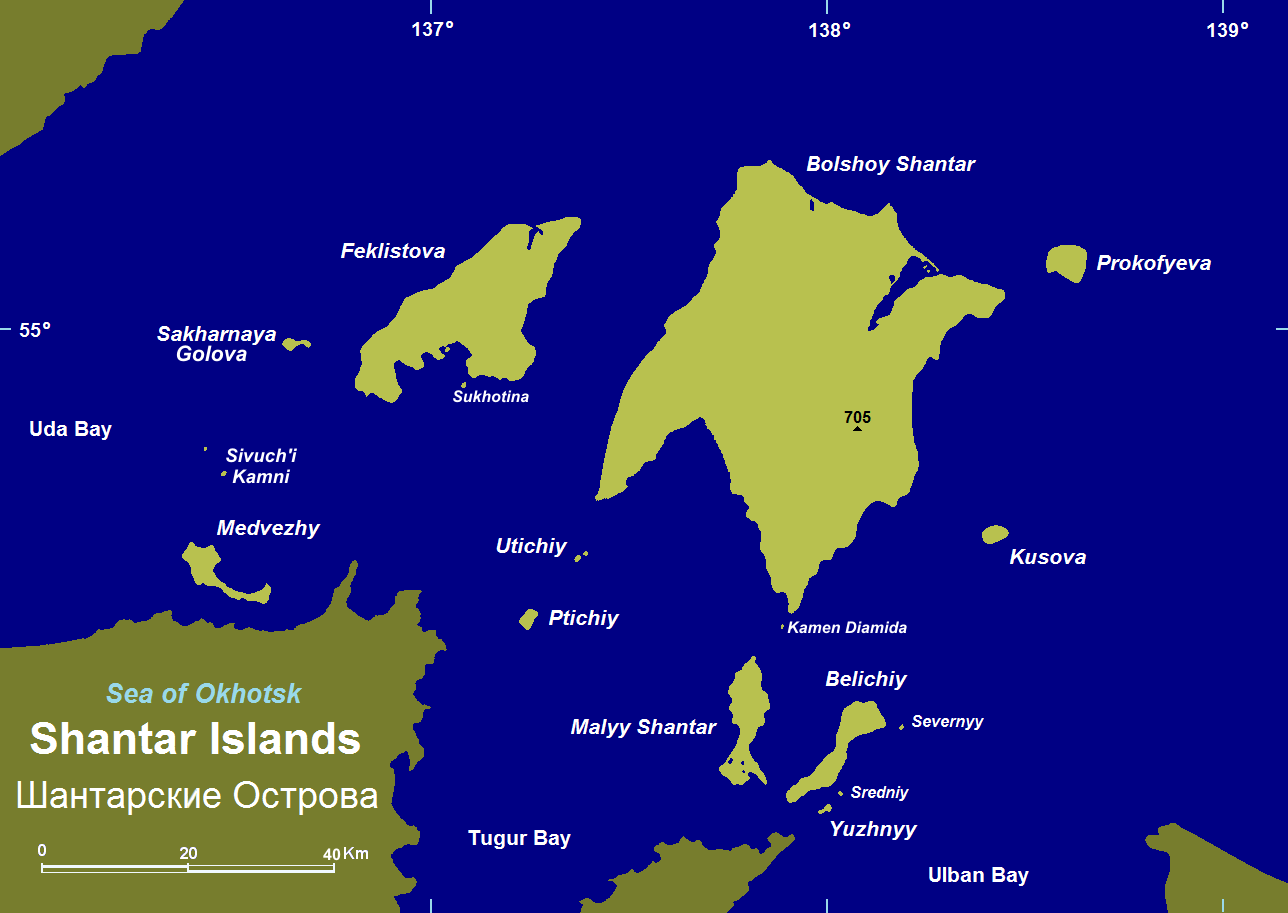
- Map of the Shantar Islands.

- Location within Khabarovsk Krai
- Coordinates: 55°0′N 136°57′E
- Country: Russian Federation
- Federal subject: Far Eastern Federal District
- Krai: Khabarovsk Krai

Area
  - Total: 372 km^{2} (144 sq mi)
- Elevation: 415 m (1,362 ft)

Feklistova or Feklistov Island (Остров Феклистова; Ostrov Feklistova) is one of the Shantar Islands in Sea of Okhotsk. With an area of 372 square kilometres (144 square miles), it is the second largest in the archipelago.

== Geography ==
Feklistova is 24 kilometres (15 miles) west to east and 19.3 km (12 mi) north to south. It lies about 20 kilometres (12 1/2 miles) west of Bolshoy Shantar Island, the main island in the group. Feklistov Island is covered with taiga forest and has a 3-kilometre-long (2-mile) lake on its northern shore separated from the sea by a spit of land.

Administratively this island belongs to the Khabarovsk Krai of the Russian Federation.

This island is part of the "Kondyor-Feklistov metallogenic belt" (KD) owing to the presence of placers which include minerals like "blacksand platinum". The "Kondyor-Feklistov metallogenic belt" is one of the major metallogenic belts of Northeast Asia. It is assumed that it formed by an oblique subduction of the oceanic crust of the Mongol-Okhotsk paleoocean under the southern margin of the Siberian continent.

== History ==
Between 1852 and 1889, American whaleships cruised for bowhead whales off Feklistova Island. They also anchored in Lebyazhya Bay on the south side of the island to stow down or boil oil, flense whales, and obtain wood and water or shelter from storms. They referred to the anchorage itself as Feklistova Harbor. As many as forty-two ships could be anchored in Lebyazhya Bay at one time.
