= Bolshoy Shantar Island =

Island in Sea of Okhotsk, Russia

Bolshoy Shantar
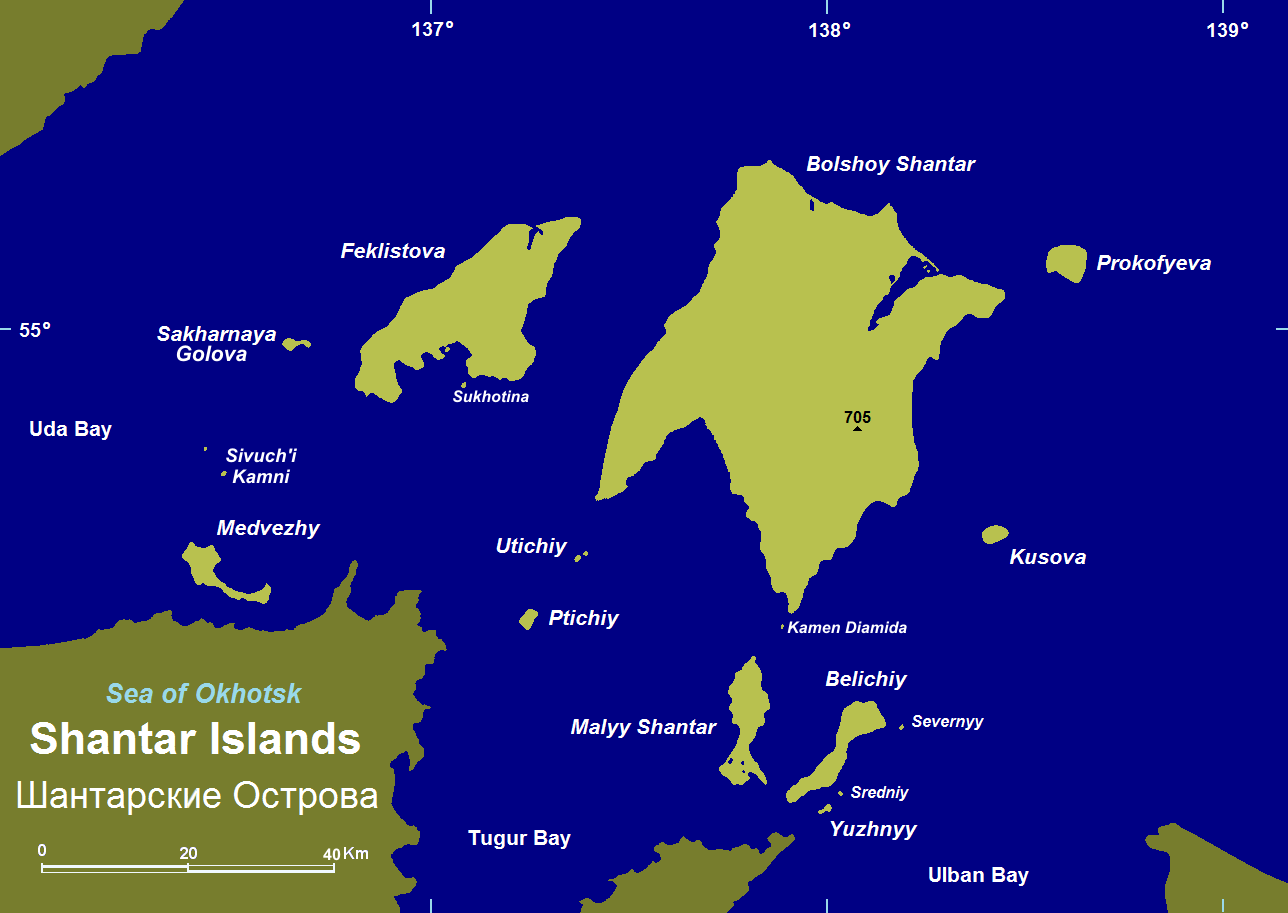
- The Shantar Islands in the Sea of Okhotsk

- Location within Khabarovsk Krai

Geography
- Location: Sea of Okhotsk
- Coordinates: 54°56′N 137°30′E
- Archipelago: Shantar Islands
- Area: 1,766 km^{2} (682 sq mi)
- Length: 72 km (44.7 mi)
- Width: 49 km (30.4 mi)

Administration
- Russia
- Federal Subject: Khabarovsk Krai

Bolshoy Shantar (Russian: Большо́й Шантар, romanized: Greater Shantar, IPA: [bɐlʲˈʂoj ʂɐnˈtar]) is the main island of the Shantar Islands in the Sea of Okhotsk, Russia; its area is 1,766 square kilometres (682 square miles) and it measures about 72 by 49 km (44 1/2 by 30 1/2 mi). It has a large brackish lake (Lake Bol'shoe, "Big Lake") on its north side which is connected to the sea through a narrow passage. Yakshin Bay indents the southwest side of the island.

Administratively this island belongs to the Khabarovsk Krai of the Russian Federation.

== History ==
The Shantar Islands were explored by Russian surveyors between 1711 and 1725.

Bolshoy Shantar was frequented by American whaleships between 1852 and 1907. They hunted bowhead whales, particularly in the passages that separate Bolshoy Shantar from Feklistova and Prokofyeva. They also went ashore to obtain wood and water and hunt bears and foxes. Two whaleships were wrecked on the island. On 18 October 1858, the bark Rajah (250 tons), of New Bedford, was wrecked on the north side of the island during a strong gale. Captain Ansel N. Stewart, the first officer, and 11 other men perished; the second mate and the twelve other crew members were saved four days later by the ship Condor (349 tons), of New Bedford, Captain Samuel H. Whiteside. Five men, including the captain, were buried on the island. Items from the wreck were found on the island as late as 1865. On 30 August 1907, the schooner Carrie and Annie (90 tons), of San Francisco, was wrecked on the island during a gale. The crew remained stranded on Bolshoy Shantar until 11 September, when the Russian transport Nitzun rescued them.

== Climate ==
Climate data for Bolshoy Shantar Island (1991–2020 normals, extremes 1924–present)
Month	Jan	Feb	Mar	Apr	May	Jun	Jul	Aug	Sep	Oct	Nov	Dec	Year
Record high °C (°F)	−0.1 (31.8)	−0.8 (30.6)	10.2 (50.4)	15.1 (59.2)	27.3 (81.1)	28.6 (83.5)	31.9 (89.4)	28.5 (83.3)	25.4 (77.7)	18.5 (65.3)	8.0 (46.4)	1.8 (35.2)	31.9 (89.4)
Mean daily maximum °C (°F)	−14.0 (6.8)	−12.6 (9.3)	−5.9 (21.4)	1.4 (34.5)	7.5 (45.5)	13.7 (56.7)	17.2 (63.0)	18.2 (64.8)	14.5 (58.1)	5.9 (42.6)	−5.3 (22.5)	−12.9 (8.8)	2.3 (36.2)
Daily mean °C (°F)	−19.3 (−2.7)	−19.0 (−2.2)	−12.6 (9.3)	−3.8 (25.2)	2.3 (36.1)	7.2 (45.0)	11.6 (52.9)	12.8 (55.0)	9.0 (48.2)	1.6 (34.9)	−8.5 (16.7)	−17.0 (1.4)	−3.0 (26.6)
Mean daily minimum °C (°F)	−25.3 (−13.5)	−25.8 (−14.4)	−19.8 (−3.6)	−9.1 (15.6)	−1.5 (29.3)	2.4 (36.3)	7.1 (44.8)	8.0 (46.4)	3.4 (38.1)	−3.0 (26.6)	−12.6 (9.3)	−22.1 (−7.8)	−8.2 (17.3)
Record low °C (°F)	−43.5 (−46.3)	−42.1 (−43.8)	−38.6 (−37.5)	−30.2 (−22.4)	−15.3 (4.5)	−6.8 (19.8)	−3.6 (25.5)	−3.9 (25.0)	−8.4 (16.9)	−21.3 (−6.3)	−34.5 (−30.1)	−41.1 (−42.0)	−43.5 (−46.3)
Average precipitation mm (inches)	30 (1.2)	15 (0.6)	25 (1.0)	32 (1.3)	57 (2.2)	47 (1.9)	60 (2.4)	72 (2.8)	68 (2.7)	79 (3.1)	55 (2.2)	36 (1.4)	576 (22.8)
Average precipitation days	9.2	6.7	6.9	8.6	9.9	9.0	9.7	11.1	11.1	11.0	13.9	11.1	118.2
Mean monthly sunshine hours	108	157	217	205	215	246	213	209	183	143	84	82	2,062
Source 1: Погода и Климат
Source 2: climatebase.ru

== Flora and fauna ==
There are spruce forests on the island and smelts (Hypomesus japonicus) and (H. olidus) are found in Lake Bol'shoe. In the spring and summer Steller's sea eagle and Aleutian tern nest on the island; long-billed murrelet also appear to breed here.

== Popular culture ==
This island is mentioned in the 2008 video game Grand Theft Auto IV as the location of the headquarters of a fictional peer-to-peer programme called Shitster (a spoof of Napster).
