= Konstantina =

Konstantina may refer to:

- Konstantina (given name), a female given name and a list of people so named
- Konstantina (Osrhoene), an ancient town of Osrhoene, now in Asian Turkey
- Konstantina Bay, a small bay in the Sea of Okhotsk
