= Academy Bay (Sea of Okhotsk) =

Bay of the Sea of Okhotsk, Russia

- Mercury Bay
- Залив Академии (Russian)
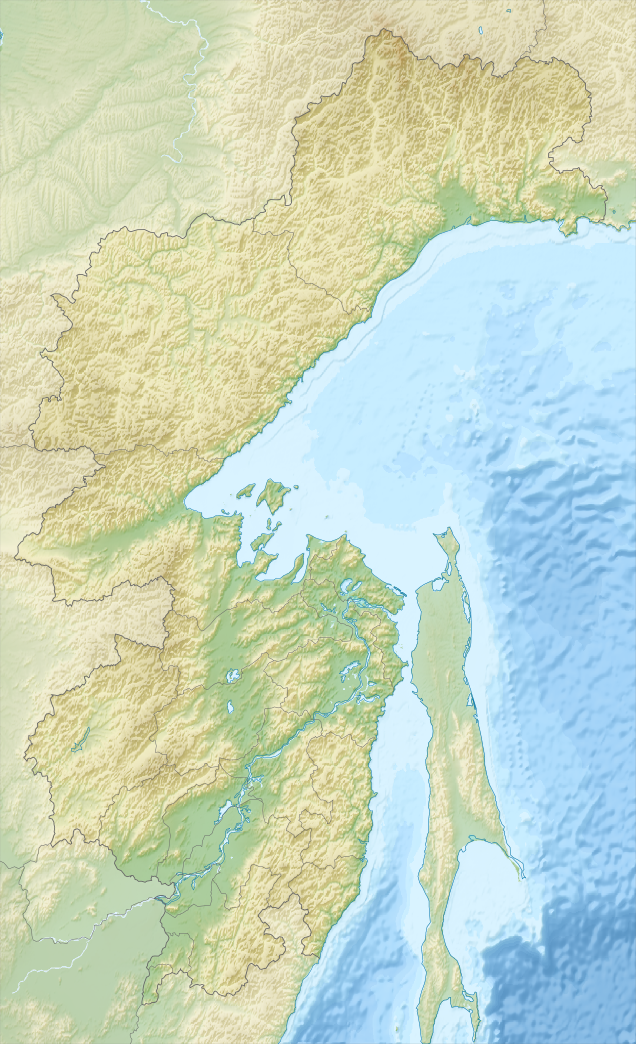
- Location in Khabarovsk Krai
- Location: Russian Far East
- Coordinates: 54°10′N 138°11′E
- Ocean/sea sources: Sea of Okhotsk
- Basin countries: Russia
- Max. length: 88.5 km (55.0 mi)
- Max. width: 56 km (35 mi)
- Surface area: 1,800 km^{2} (690 sq mi)
- Average depth: 20 m (66 ft)

Academy Bay (Russian: залив Академии, Zaliv Akademii) is a large bay in the Tuguro-Chumikansky District of Khabarovsk Krai, Russian Federation.

== Geography ==
Academy Bay is located to the south of the Shantar Islands, in the western Sea of Okhotsk. Its western and eastern points, Seneka Point and Cape Wrangel, are 56 km (35 mi) apart, while the bay itself is 88.5 km (55 mi) deep in a southwesterly direction.

The bay has three branches: Konstantina Bay to the west, Ulban Bay to the south, and Nikolaya Bay to the east.

== History ==
Academy Bay was named by Alexander von Middendorff after the Saint Petersburg Academy of Sciences (Петербургская академия наук) during his 1844 - 1845 expedition to the area.

Academy Bay was frequented by American whaleships hunting bowhead whales between 1852 and 1889. They called its southern branch Ulban Bay Mercury Bay (though this term was sometimes applied to the entire bay). Benjamin F. Wing, master of the ship Good Return, reported as many as forty-five other ships in the bay in 1854. Two ships were wrecked in the bay: the ship Washington, of Sag Harbor, in Ulban Bay in 1855 and the ship Natchez, of New Bedford, in Nikolaya Bay in 1856.

Russian schooners and boat crews from Mamga also cruised for bowheads in the bay from 1865 to 1871.

During a four day period in mid-September 1968, the Soviet factory ship Vladivostok and its fleet of whale catchers illegally caught over sixty balaenids (likely bowheads) in and near Academy Bay.

== Wildlife ==
In the summer beluga whales aggregate in estuaries at the heads of Ulban and Nikolaya bays to feed on spawning salmon. Bowhead whales are a common sight in the gulf in the summer. Killer whales, which have been seen preying on bowheads in the gulf, also occur here.
