= William P. Biddle =

19/20th-century United States Marine Corps officer

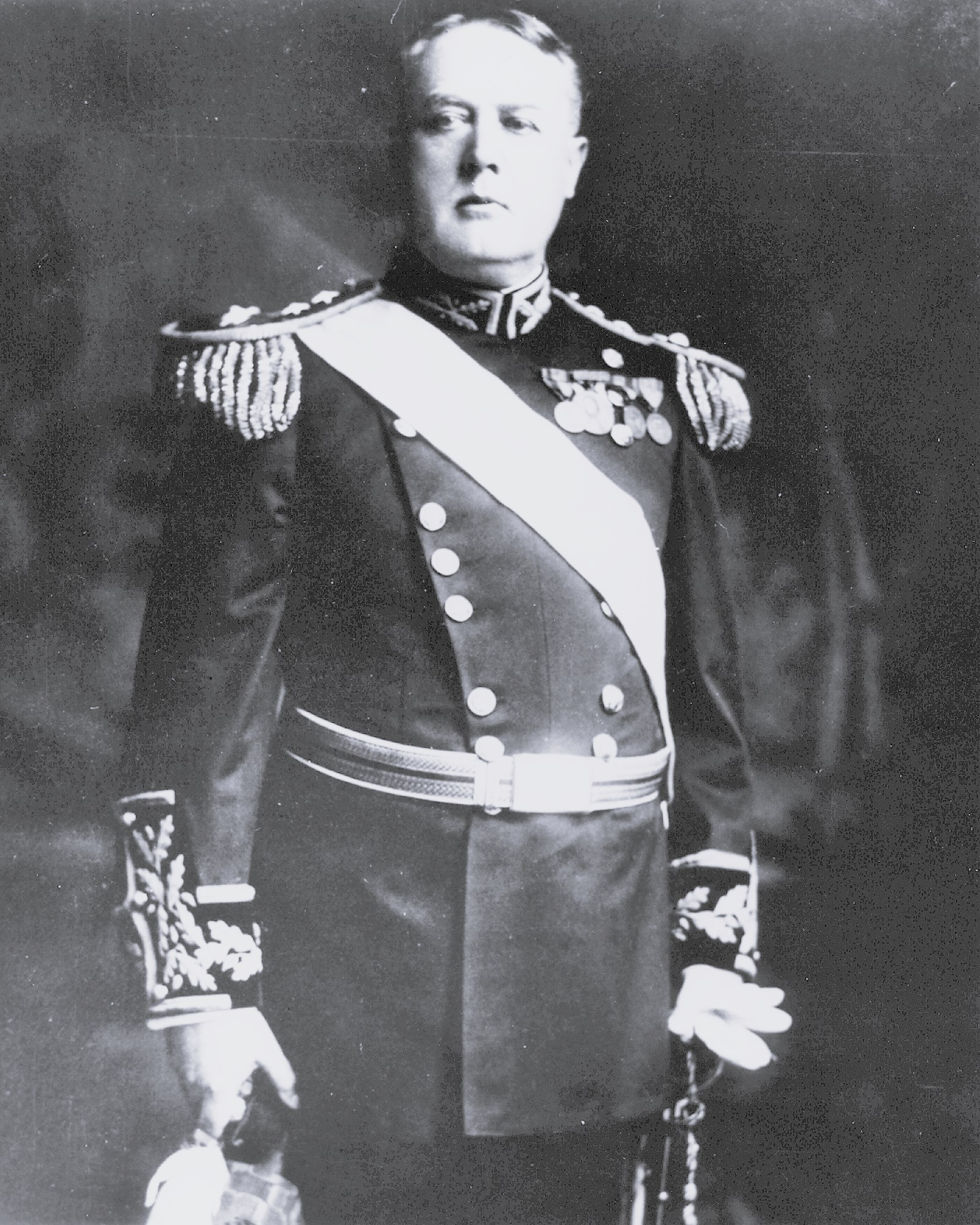
- 11th Commandant of the Marine Corps (1910-1914)
- Born: December 15, 1853; Philadelphia, Pennsylvania, U.S.
- Died: February 24, 1923 (aged 69); Nice, France
- Burial place: Arlington National Cemetery
- Military career
- Allegiance: United States of America
- Branch: United States Marine Corps
- Service years: 1875–1914, 1917–1919
- Rank: Major General
- Commands: Commandant of the Marine Corps
- Conflicts: Spanish–American War: Battle of Manila Bay; Boxer Rebellion: China Relief Expedition; Philippine–American War; World War I

Major General William Phillips Biddle (December 15, 1853 – February 24, 1923) was the 11th Commandant of the United States Marine Corps.

== Biography ==
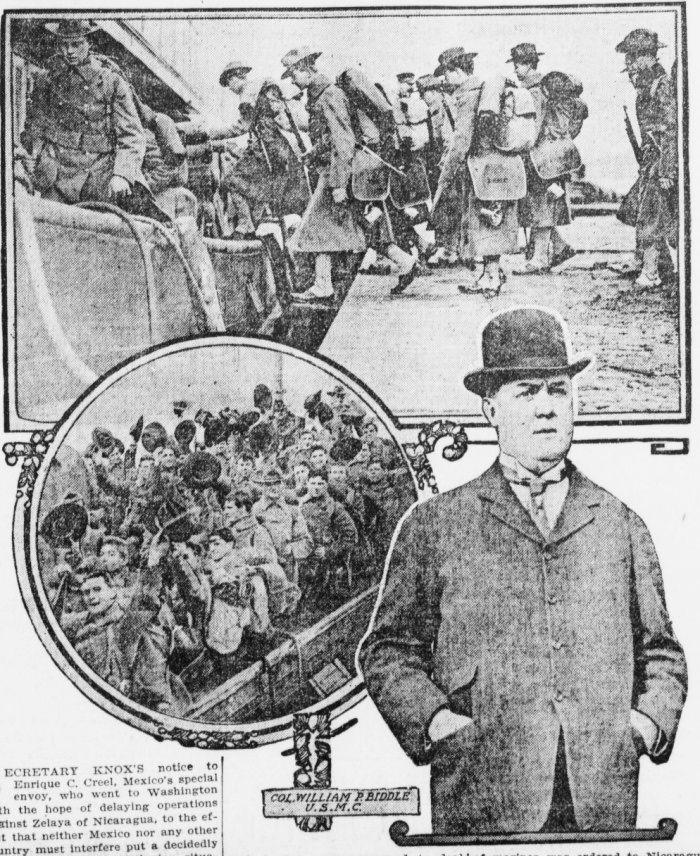
U.S. Marines leaving New York City in 1909 for deployment in Nicaragua. Then-Colonel Biddle is in civilian clothes at right.

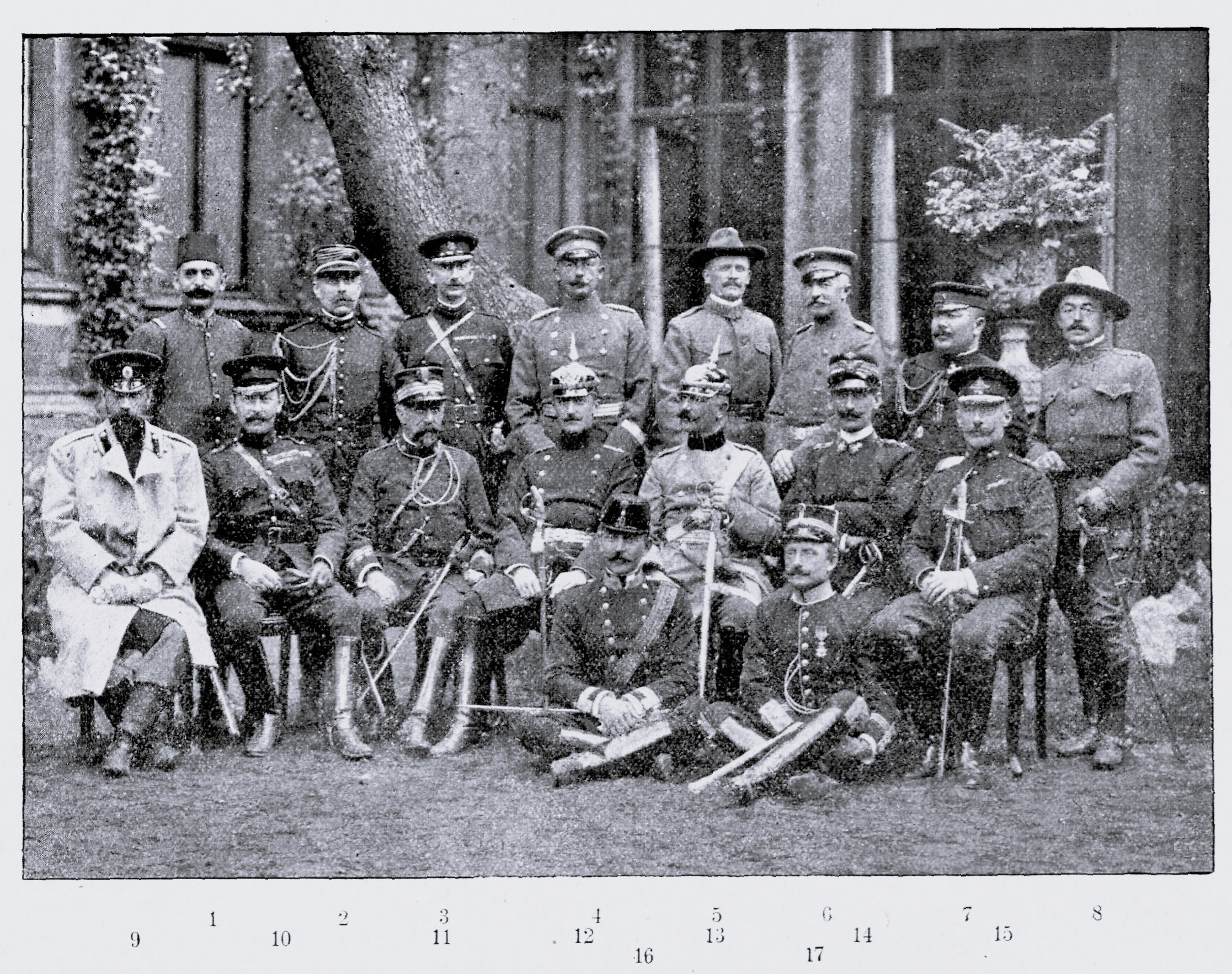
Foreign observers during German military maneuvers in 1904. Biddle is in the back row, fourth from the right.

=== Early life ===
William Phillip Biddle was born on December 15, 1853, in Philadelphia, Pennsylvania. His family was a part of the prominent Biddle family. He was educated in private schools in the Philadelphia area, by touring and at the University of Pennsylvania, where he joined the prestigious fraternity Delta Psi AKA St. Anthony Hall as did a number of Biddle family men.

Biddle was commissioned a second lieutenant in the Marine Corps on 22 June 1875 and after short tours of duty in Washington, D.C., New York City and Philadelphia, made the first of his many tours of sea duty on which he passed nearly half of his active service. After three years on USS Hartford and USS Powhatan, Biddle again went ashore for duty at Philadelphia and New York. He returned to sea duty on USS Kearsarge in March 1882, and was promoted to first lieutenant in February 1884. With a break of less than three years at the same stations as his previous shore duty, he again went to sea for three years on USS Swarta. He returned to Philadelphia for duty in February 1891, where he was promoted to captain in February 1894. He resumed sea duty on board USS Baltimore in April 1895, and was shortly afterwards transferred to USS Olympia on which he served during the Spanish–American War and participated in the Battle of Manila Bay.

=== After war ===
Soon after the close of the war, Captain Biddle returned to Philadelphia for duty but was soon called to join the Fourth Battalion of Marines organized for duty in the Far East. With that battalion he arrived in China in time to take part in the US China Relief Expedition to Peking in 1900. After the affairs of the Boxer Rebellion had been somewhat adjusted, Capt. Biddle was transferred with his battalion to the First Brigade of Marines, Philippine Islands, where he served a little over two years, and then returned to the United States for duty at Headquarters. He was promoted to lieutenant colonel on 23 March 1903. In December of that year he was sent to Panama in command of the battalion of Marines on USS Dixie, which arrived in time to participate in affairs when the independence of that country was declared. He returned to the United States soon afterwards and served for short tours of duty in Philadelphia and at Headquarters, Marine Corps.

Biddle was promoted to colonel in February 1905 and during the following year, returned to the Philippine Islands where he commanded the First Brigade of Marines for about two years. He reported for duty at Headquarters in May 1908, and was soon afterwards detailed in Philadelphia and sent to Panama to reinforce the troops protecting the construction of the Panama Canal, and for potential duty in Nicaragua. He returned to Headquarters in April 1910, where he continued to serve the remainder of his active duty. During the closing months of Major General Elliott's commandancy, Colonel Biddle acted as Commandant most of the time.

Colonel Biddle was chosen as Major General Commandant of the Marine Corps on 3 February 1911. Colonel Biddle's tour of duty as Commandant was a comparatively quiet, short and uneventful one. He concerned himself primarily with the routine affairs of the Corps. Several minor expeditions took place, including the first intervention in Nicaragua. Under his administration, the Advance Base Force, forerunner of today's Fleet Marine Force, was also established in December 1913.

After nearly three years in office, Major General Commandant Biddle applied for retirement on the ground of having completed more than thirty years' service, and he was retired on 24 February 1914. He was recalled for active duty during the World War and served primarily on court-martial duty at San Diego, California.

== Death ==
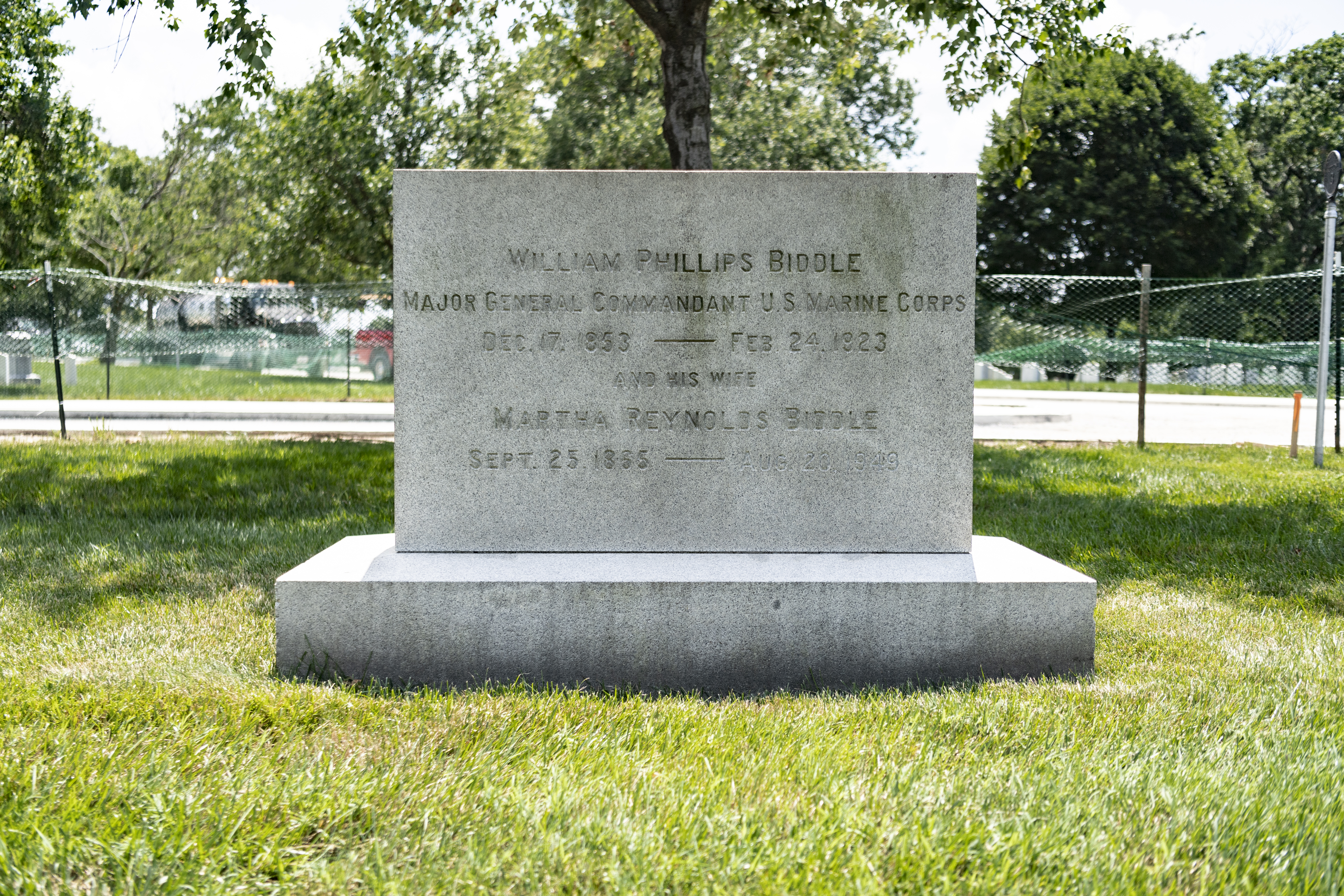
Gravesite of Major General William Biddle in Section 3 of Arlington National Cemetery, 2023

Major General Biddle died in Nice, France, on 24 February 1923 and was buried a month later in Arlington National Cemetery with full military honors.

== Awards ==
- Dewey Medal
- Spanish Campaign Medal
- Philippine Campaign Medal
- Victory Medal

== Sources ==
- "Major General William P. Biddle, USMC". Who's Who in Marine Corps History. United States Marine Corps History Division. Archived from the original on 2011-05-16.
- "William Phillips Biddle, Major General, United States Marine Corps". Arlington National Cemetery.
- Hamersly, Lewis Randolph (1889). The Records of Living Officers of the U.S. Navy and Marine Corps (sixth ed.). L. R. Hamersly & Company.
- Allan Reed Millett; Jack Shulimson, eds. (2004). Commandants of the Marine Corps. Annapolis, Maryland: Naval Institute Press. pp. 163–173. ISBN 978-0-87021-012-9.

Military offices
Preceded by Maj. Gen. George F. Elliott	Commandant of the United States Marine Corps; 1910–1914	Succeeded by Maj. Gen. George Barnett
