= Nikolaya Bay =

Bay in the Sea of Okhotsk

Coordinates: 53°42′N 138°34′E

Nikolaya Bay (Russian: залив Николая, romanized: Zaliv Nikolaya), formerly Usalginsky Bay (Russian: Усальгинская губа, romanized: Usal'ginskaya Guba), is a small, narrow bay in the northwestern Sea of Okhotsk, just south of the Shantar Islands. It is a southeastern branch of the larger Academy Bay to the north. Its northern and southern points, Lamsdorf Point and Cape Grote, are separated by only 8 km (5 mi), while the bay itself is about 59.5 km (37 mi) deep in a southerly direction. The Tokara Peninsula separates it from Ulban Bay to the west. The Usalgin River runs into its head. Spring tides rise 5.5 m (18 ft), while neaps rise 2.4–3 m (8–10 ft). There is ice in the bay from mid-November to mid-July.

== History ==
Nikolaya Bay was frequented by American whaleships between 1854 and 1885. The ships anchored off Potter's Head (Cape Grote) or in the mouth of the bay and sent smaller whaleboats to the head of the bay to search for bowhead whales. They called it Potter's Bay, after Oliver Potter, master of the barque Antelope (340 tons), of Newport, who caught whales in the bay in 1853.

On 7 October 1856, the ship Natchez (524 tons), of New Bedford, was wrecked on the west side of the bay while attempting to seek shelter from a gale. Most of the crew was rescued by the bark Harmony; four men, including the third and fourth mates, decided to stay the winter and protect the ship. In July 1857, the ship Italy picked up the three survivors – one had died in June after a prolonged illness. She also salvaged most of the 1,200 bbls of oil and 18,000 lbs of whalebone left aboard the vessel when she had wrecked. Ships were still pilfering items from the wreck in 1858.

In 1865 two whaleships hid at the head of the bay from the CSS Shenandoah.

Russian schooners and boat crews from Mamga also cruised for bowheads in the bay from 1865 to 1871.

== Wildlife ==
In the spring beluga whales feed on spawning capelin, smelt, and herring in Nikolaya Bay, while in the summer they aggregate at the head of the bay to feed on spawning salmon in the upper reaches of the Usalgin River and its estuary. In the summer bowhead whales can also be seen in the bay.
