= George F. Elliott =

United States Marine Corps general

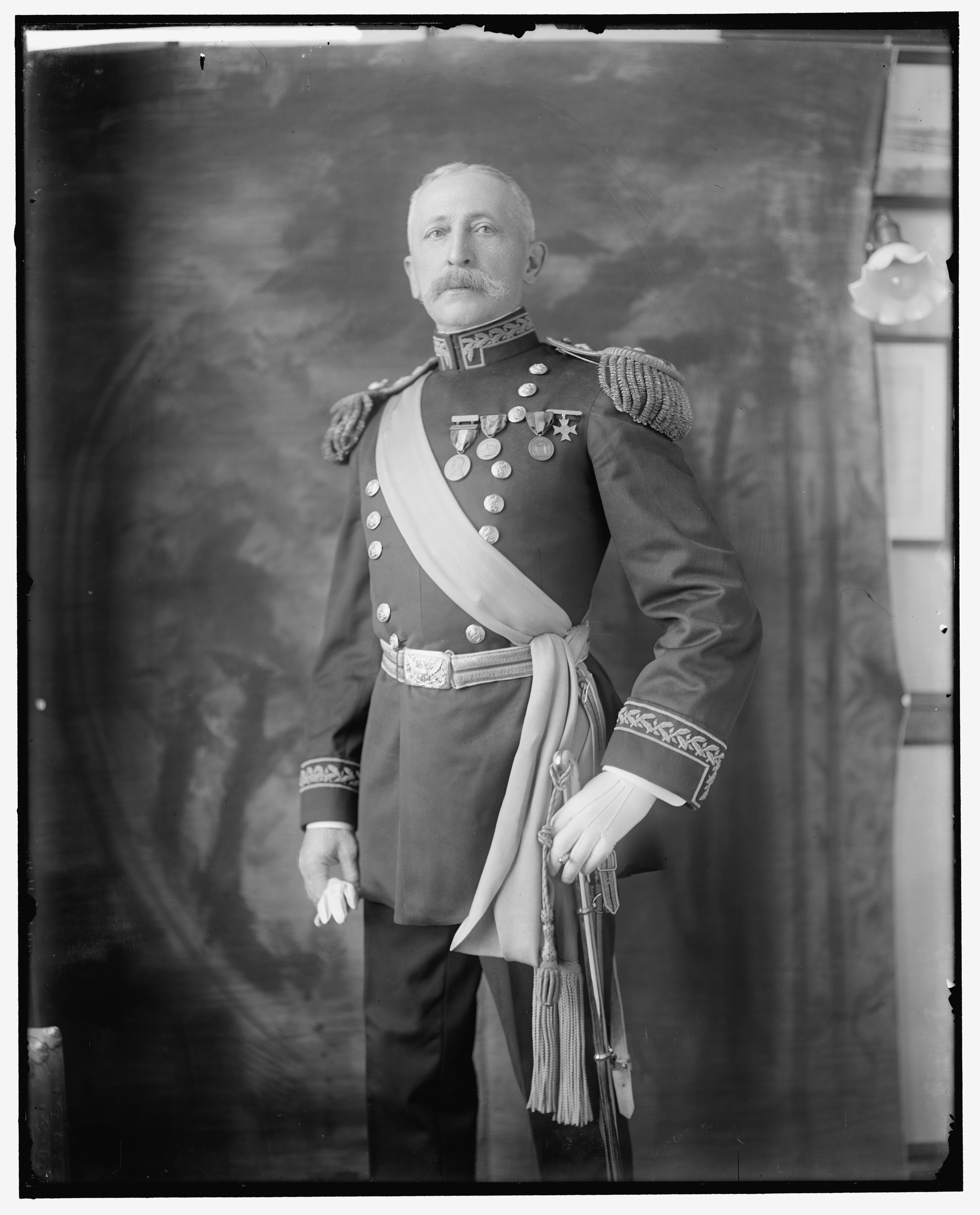
- 10th Commandant of the Marine Corps (1903–1910)
- Born: November 30, 1846; Eutaw, Alabama, U.S.
- Died: November 4, 1931 (aged 84); Washington, D.C., U.S.
- Burial place: Arlington National Cemetery
- Military career
- Allegiance: United States of America
- Branch: United States Marine Corps
- Service years: 1870–1910
- Rank: Major General
- Commands: Commandant of the Marine Corps
- Conflicts: Panama crisis of 1885; Spanish–American War; Philippine–American War

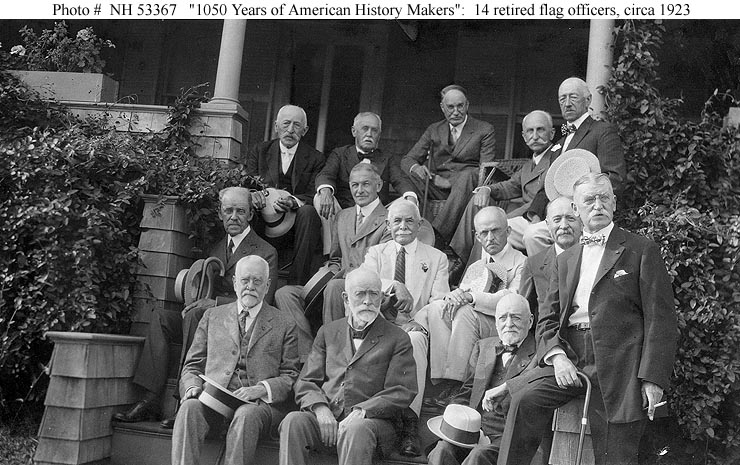
A retired George F. Elliot is on the left in the back row in this photograph taken with 13 retired United States Navy rear admirals ca. 1923.

George Frank Elliott (November 30, 1846 – November 4, 1931) was a United States Marine Corps major general. He was the tenth Commandant of the Marine Corps between 1903 and 1910.

== Biography ==
George Elliott, born in Eutaw, Alabama, was appointed to the United States Military Academy in 1868 and was honorably discharged in June 1870 upon the completion of two-years of the four-year course of study there.

In October 1870, he was appointed a second lieutenant in the Marine Corps. Second Lieutenant Elliott served at the Marine Barracks, Washington, D.C., from the time of his appointment to the Marine Corps until 1871, when he was transferred to Portsmouth, New Hampshire. He later served on Vermont, Frolic, and Monongahela, and was on duty at the Marine Barracks at Norfolk, Virginia, in 1877 when a battalion of Marines was ordered to that post from Washington, D.C. during the strike of railway employees. He was in command of the detachment that guarded the Baltimore and Ohio Railroad tunnel and also acted as guard for the paymaster of the railroad. He returned to Norfolk upon detachment from that duty. He was promoted to first lieutenant in 1878.

In 1880, First Lieutenant Elliott was ordered to duty on board Alliance and served at the Marine Barracks, Boston, Massachusetts, from 1882 to 1884, when he returned to Norfolk. He was with the Marine battalion sent to the Isthmus of Panama in 1885. He was promoted to captain in 1892.

In 1894, he was attached to USS Baltimore as Fleet Marine Officer when that ship was sent to China to guard American interests during the war between Japan and China. He and his men made a forced march to Seoul, a distance of 31 miles (50 km), part of which was through submerged rice fields, in eleven hours.

In June 1895, Captain Elliott was sent to the Marine Barracks, Brooklyn, New York, and from 22 April to 22 September 1898, he was on duty with the 1st Marine Battalion with the North Atlantic Fleet. The fleet was sent to hold its position at Guantanamo Bay, Cuba.

On 14 July 1898, Elliott was in command of Companies C and D, composed of 150 Marines and 50 Cubans, which were ordered to destroy the well at Cuzco, about six miles (9.7 km) from Guantanamo, and the only water supply of the Spaniards within twelve miles (19 km). Two and a half miles (4.0 km) from Cuzco, half of the Cubans and the first platoon of Company C passed over a mountain to the left, hoping to cut off the Spanish pickets. In this they failed, and the main force was discovered by the Spanish outpost, which retreated immediately and gave the alarm to the main body, whose headquarters were in a house at Cuzco. A high mountain separated the two forces at this point and each attempted to gain its crest as a point of vantage. The Marines were successful, but were fired on heavily by the enemy from the valley. Following a straggling retreat by the Spaniards, the Marines began the return march, the well having been destroyed. For his eminent and conspicuous conduct in this engagement, Captain Elliott's seniority in his grade was advanced three numbers.

Later in 1898, upon his return to the United States, he became a Veteran Companion of the Pennsylvania Commandery of the Military Order of Foreign Wars.

In October 1898, he was detached from the Marine Barracks in Brooklyn and ordered to the Marine Barracks at the Washington Navy Yard. He was promoted to Major (United States) in March 1899.

In August 1899, Major Elliott was ordered to command the Second Battalion of Marines for duty in the Philippines and was promoted to lieutenant colonel in September of that year. From October 1899 to January 1900, Lt. Col Elliott commanded the First Brigade of Marines in the Philippines. During this period he engaged in the Second Battle of Noveleta. For his conduct during this battle, he was personally commended by Secretary of the Navy Long. Secretary Long wrote:

The department has received with much gratification the reports of the engagement of the forces under your command with the Philippine Insurgents at Novaleta on October 8, 1899. Taking into consideration that Spanish forces had on previous occasions found the insurgent position at Novaleta impregnable, and at one time an entire regiment had been lost there, the conduct of the forces under your command, numbering only three hundred (300), was, on this occasion, of a most creditable character. The department extends to you and the force under your command its hearty commendation and congratulation.

On his return to the United States he was on duty at Norfolk until 1903, when he was given command of the Marine Barracks, Washington, D.C., and promoted to colonel in March 1903.

On 3 October 1903, he was appointed Brigadier General Commandant of the Marine Corps, relieving Major General Charles Heywood. In December 1903, he was ordered to command a Provisional Brigade of Marines organized for service in Panama. He departed on 27, December with the brigade on board USS Dixie, arriving at Colón on 3 January 1904, and went into camp at Haute Obispo, Panama. He relinquished command of the brigade on 15 February 1904, and resumed his duties at Headquarters Marine Corps on the 25th of the same month.

On 21 May 1908, he was appointed Major General Commandant of the Marine Corps. One of the most difficult endeavors of General Elliott's career was his successful resistance to attempts to remove seagoing Marines from capital ships and to merge the Corps into the Army. Also during his tenure, the home post of the Corps, the Marine Barracks at 8th and I Streets SE in Washington, D.C., underwent major changes. In 1903, the old barracks were condemned and pulled down and by 1910 had been rebuilt essentially in their present form.

In 1910, Elliot had a personal disagreement with Col. Charles Lauchheimer and a number of other top Marine officers, ending in a censure of all the officers including Elliot who was allowed to retire. He was placed on the retired list on 30 November 1910 upon reaching the statutory retirement age.

Major General Elliott died at his home in Washington, D.C., shortly after noon 4 November 1931 after a brief illness. His remains were interred in the Arlington National Cemetery.

== Legacy ==
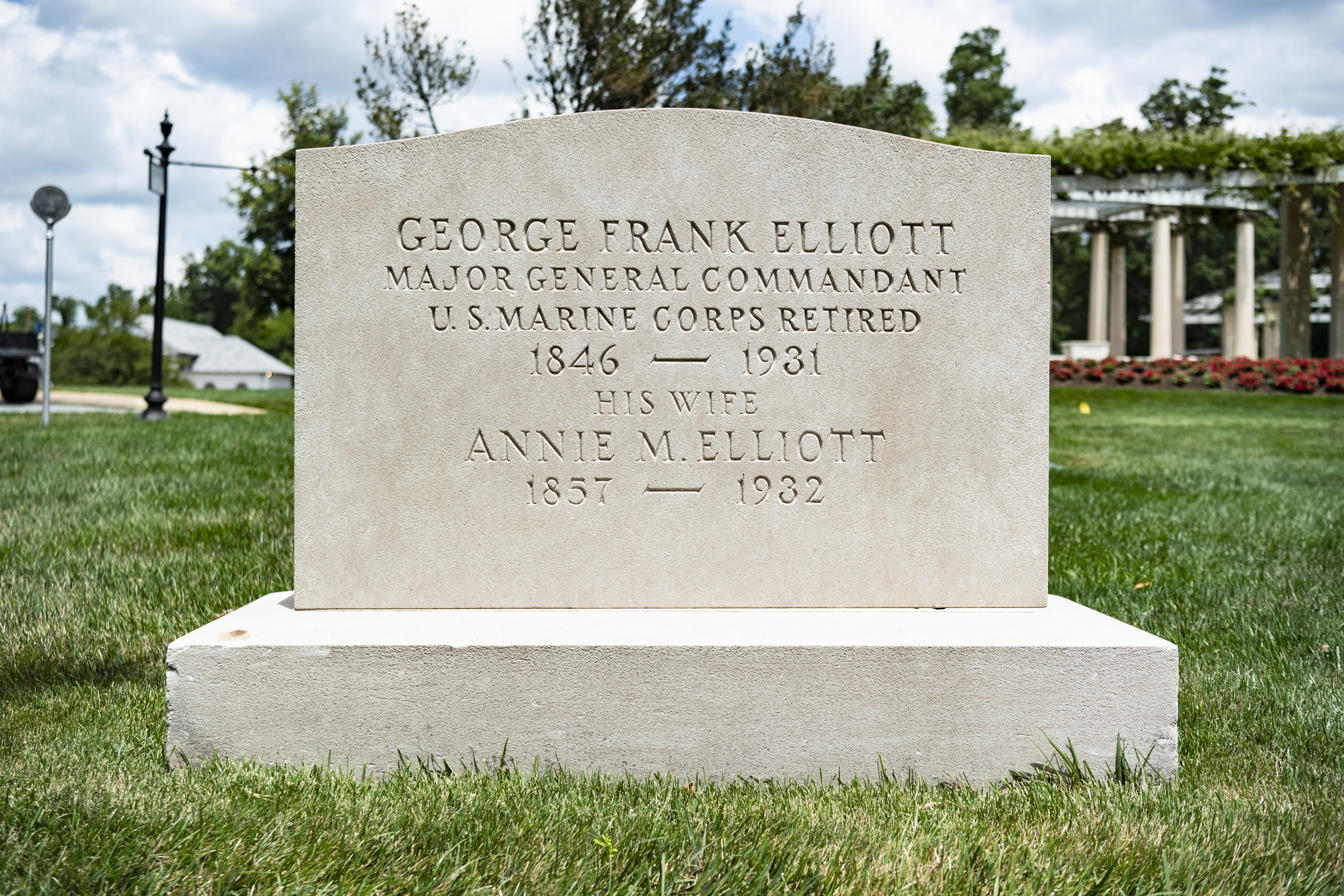
Grave at Arlington National Cemetery

USS George F. Elliott (AP-13), a Heywood-class transport (1918–1942), was named in honor of Major General Elliott. The ship was sunk off Guadalcanal in 1942.

USS George F. Elliott (AP-105) was also named after him. The second Elliott was commissioned on 23 September 1943 and decommissioned on 10 June 1946.

General Elliott's nephew was Vice Admiral Elliott Buckmaster, USN (1889–1976). VADM Buckmaster commanded the USS Yorktown when she was sunk at the Battle of Midway.

Camp Elliott, a Marine Corp Tanks, artillery, and infantry training facility near Camp Kearny in San Diego County, east of the Miramar Marine Corps Airfield, was renamed after George F. Elliott (formerly Camp Holcomb) in 1940. The camp was instrumental in training the landing forces for the Pacific Campaign against the Japanese in WWII.

== Awards ==
- Sampson Medal
- Spanish Campaign Medal
- Philippine Campaign Medal

== See also ==
Military offices
Preceded by Maj. Gen. Charles Heywood	Commandant of the United States Marine Corps; 1903–1910	Succeeded by Maj. Gen. William P. Biddle
