= List of shipwrecks in October 1856 =

The list of shipwrecks in October 1856 includes ships sunk, foundered, wrecked, grounded, or otherwise lost during October 1856.

== 1 October ==
List of shipwrecks: 1 October 1856
Ship	State	Description
Hayward	United Kingdom	The ship ran aground on the Haisborough Sands, in the North Sea off the coast of Norfolk. She floated off and sank.
Miza	Hamburg	The ship collided with the steamship Salboda (Sweden) and sank in the North Sea off Heligoland. Her crew were rescued by Salboda. Miza was on a voyage from Hartlepool, County Durham, United Kingdom to Blankenese.
Pelican	United Kingdom	The brig was driven ashore and wrecked at Drogheda, County Louth. Her five crew were rescued by the Drogheda Lifeboat.
Walmer Castle	United Kingdom	The ship ran aground at the mouth of the Min River. She was on a voyage from Foo Chow Foo, China to London. She was refloated.
Wild Duck	United States	The clipper ran aground in the Min River. She was on a voyage from Foo Chow Foo to New York. Although refloated, she was not returned to service.

== 2 October ==
List of shipwrecks: 2 October 1856
Ship	State	Description
Alert	United Kingdom	The brig was in collision with a barque and foundered in the North Sea off Whitby, Yorkshire. Her crew were rescued.
Jane	United Kingdom	The barque was wrecked on Lady Island, Nova Scotia, British North America. She was on a voyage from London to Pictou, Nova Scotia.

== 3 October ==
List of shipwrecks: 3 October 1856
Ship	State	Description
Farto	Norway	The ship was driven ashore at Dungeness, Kent, United Kingdom. She was on a voyage from Bergen to Livorno, Grand Duchy of Tuscany.
Iraclis	Ottoman Empire	The ship was run into by the steamship Minna (United Kingdom and sank at Büyükdere.
Jules	France	The ship was wrecked between St Margaret's Island and Caldey Island, Pembrokeshire, United Kingdom with the loss of a crew member.
Nymph	United Kingdom	The ship caught fire in the North Sea. She was towed in to North Shields, County Durham, where she sank. She was on a voyage from Sunderland, County Durham to Arbroath, Forfarshire.
Skiraton	United Kingdom	The ship sank at Antwerp, Belgium.

== 4 October ==
List of shipwrecks: 4 October 1856
Ship	State	Description
Acadia	United Kingdom	The ship ran aground and was severely damaged at Sheerness, Kent.
Margaret	United Kingdom	The schooner was run down and sunk in the River Mersey by the steamship Vigo (United Kingdom). Her crew were rescued. She was on a voyage from Liverpool, Lancashire to Plymouth, Devon.
Salem	United Kingdom	The ship ran aground in the River Lagan. She was on a voyage from Quebec City, Province of Canada, British North America to Belfast, County Antrim.

== 5 October ==
List of shipwrecks: 5 October 1856
Ship	State	Description
Dairymaid	United Kingdom	The ship was wrecked off the Wingo Beacon, in the Baltic Sea. Her crew were rescued. She was on a voyage from Königsberg, Prussia to London.
Elie	France	The ship was wrecked on the Bird Rock, in the Bahamas. She was on a voyage from Gonaïves, Haiti to Havre de Grâce, Seine-Inférieure.
Foreningen	Norway	The brig ran aground off Helsingør, Denmark. She was on a voyage from Oulu, Grand Duchy of Finland to London.
Irwell	United Kingdom	The steamship ran aground off Brielle, South Holland, Netherlands.
Maria	United Kingdom	The ship ran aground at Sandhammaren, Sweden and was wrecked. Her crew were rescued. She was on a voyage from Saint Petersburg, Russia to an English port.

== 6 October ==
List of shipwrecks: 6 October 1856
Ship	State	Description
Amy	United Kingdom	The ship was driven ashore near Ventava, Courland Governorate. She was on a voyage from Liverpool, Lancashire to Kronstadt, Russia. She was refloated and completed her voyage, arriving at Kronstadt on 15 October.
Chance	United Kingdom	The ship was driven ashore at Wexford. Her crew were rescued. She was on a voyage from Newport, Monmouthshire to Wexford. Chance was refloated on 12 October.
Jane	(United Kingdom of Great Britain and Ireland)	The ship was lost in the Gut of Canso. She was on a voyage from London to Pictou, Nova Scotia.
Magdalena	Norway	The galeas was abandoned. Her crew were rescued by a Danish vessel.. She was on a voyage from Newcastle upon Tyne, Northumberland, United Kingdom to Helsingør, Denmark. She was towed in to Kristiansand the next day.
Wildflower	United Kingdom	The ship was in collision with Jurgen ( Rostock) and sank in the Baltic Sea. Her crew were rescued. She was on a voyage from Newcastle upon Tyne, Northumberland to Riga, Russia.

== 7 October ==
List of shipwrecks: 7 October 1856
Ship	State	Description
Carl	Stralsund	The ship was driven ashore. She was on a voyage from Belfast, County Antrim to Newcastle upon Tyne, Northumberland, United Kingdom. She was refloated and towed in to "Bayharvey", "Barron Island".
Charlotte	United Kingdom	The schooner ran aground on the Newcombe Sands, in the North Sea off the coast of Suffolk and was wrecked. Her crew were rescued by a yawl. She was on a voyage from Hartlepool, County Durham to Weymouth, Dorset.
Dronning Maria	Flag unknown	The ship ran aground on the Maplin Sand, in the North Sea off the coast of Essex, United Kingdom. She was on a voyage from Riga, Russia to London, United Kingdom. She was refloated and taken in to London in a leaky condition.
Electra	United Kingdom	The brig was in collision with the schooner Hero (United Kingdom) and was consequently beached at Sea Palling, Norfolk. Her crew were rescued. She subsequently broke up.
Fortuna	United Kingdom	The ship sprang a leak and was beached at Lindisfarne, Northumberland.
Hans Jorgenson	United Kingdom	The clipper ran aground on the Nore. She was on a voyage from Kiel, Prussia to London.
Jane	United Kingdom	The ship was in collision with Commerce (United Kingdom) and sank off Bardsey Island, Pembrokeshire. Her crew were rescued by Commerce. Jane was on a voyage from Barrow in Furness, Lancashire to Newport, Monmouthshire.
Margaret	United Kingdom	The schooner was abandoned in the Dogger Bank. Her crew were rescued by a Prussian brig.
Marie	France	The brig ran aground on the Goodwin Sands, Kent, United Kingdom and was wrecked. Her crew were rescued. She was on a voyage from Stockholm, Sweden to Saint-Malo, Ille-et-Vilaine.
Natchez	United States	The ship was wrecked in Nikolaya Bay in the western Sea of Okhotsk during a gale. Most of the crew were rescued by the barque Harmony (United States); four men – one of whom died – wintered by the wreck. These three survivors and most of the cargo of whale oil and whalebone were saved by the ship Italy (United States) in 1857.
Trent	United Kingdom	The ship was wrecked on the Middle Sand, in the North Sea off the coast of Essex. Her crew were rescued. She was on a voyage from Arkhangelsk, Russia to London. The wreck was taken in to Wivenhoe, Essex on 12 October.

== 8 October ==
List of shipwrecks: 8 October 1856
Ship	State	Description
Annie	United Kingdom	The ship ran aground "in Garnroyle". She was on a voyage from Buctouche, New Brunswick, British North America to Belfast, County Antrim.
Captain Cook	United Kingdom	The ship was in collision with another vessel and ran aground in the Hooghly River.
Palmyra	United Kingdom	The ship was in collision with a brig and foundered in the North Sea. Her crew were rescued by Bell (United Kingdom). She was on a voyage from Newcastle upon Tyne, Northumberland to Torquay, Devon.
Sophia	United Kingdom	The ship ran aground on the Maplin Sand, in the North Sea off the coast of Essex. She was on a voyage from Saint Petersburg, Russia to Chatham, Kent. She was refloated and taken in to Sheerness, Kent in a leaky condition.
Ulysses	United Kingdom	The ship was driven ashore at Wells-next-the-Sea, Norfolk. She was on a voyage from Sunderland, County Durham to London.

== 9 October ==
List of shipwrecks: 9 October 1856
Ship	State	Description
Peter	United Kingdom	The ship was driven ashore at Swinemünde, Prussia. She was on a voyage from Liverpool, Lancashire to Stettin. She was refloated.
Thomas James	United Kingdom	The ship ran aground on the Hare Island Shoal. She was on a voyage from Quebec City, Province of Canada, British North America to Sharpness, Gloucestershire.

== 10 October ==
List of shipwrecks: 10 October 1856
Ship	State	Description
Despatch	United Kingdom	The ship was wrecked at Trieste.

== 11 October ==
List of shipwrecks: 11 October 1856
Ship	State	Description
Annegrieva	Denmark	The ship ran aground off the entrance to the Agger Canal and was beached. She was on a voyage from Hartlepool, County Durham, United Kingdom to Lemvig.
Fortuna	United Kingdom	The ship was wrecked near Ventava, Courland Governorate.
Fortuna	United Kingdom	The ship was wrecked near Windsor, Nova Scotia, British North America.
Grace Darling	United Kingdom	The schooner was run into by the brig Peru ( (United Kingdom of Great Britain and Ireland) British North America) and sank in the River Usk. She was on a voyage from Piel Island, Lancashire to Newport, Monmouthshire.
James and Thomas	United Kingdom	The ship ran aground on the Hare Island Shoals. She was on a voyage from Quebec City, Canada, British North America to Sharpness, Gloucestershire.
Nora	United Kingdom	The brigantine was run into by the full-rigged ship Trenton ( Kingdom of Sardinia) in the Haisborough Gatway, off the coast of Norfolk and sank with the loss of all hands. She was on a voyage from Sunderland, County Durham to Rye, Sussex.
Tryphena	United Kingdom	The ship departed from New York, United States for Southampton, Hampshire. No further trace, presumed foundered with the loss of all hands.

== 13 October ==
List of shipwrecks: 13 October 1856
Ship	State	Description
Catherine	United Kingdom	The ship foundered in the North Sea (56°00′N 3°40′E). Her crew were rescued by Windsor (United Kingdom). Catherine was on a voyage from Liverpool, Lancashire to Riga, Russia.
Cleveland	United Kingdom	The barque departed from Cardiff, Glamorgan for London. Subsequently foundered off the coast of Cornwall at the entrance to the English Channel with the loss of all 24 crew.
Demosthenes	United Kingdom	The ship departed from Cardiff for Malta. No further trace, presumed foundered with the loss of all hands.
Royal Family	United Kingdom	The ship was destroyed by fire in the Indian Ocean. Her crew were rescued by Rose (France). Royal Family was on a voyage from Calcutta to Bombay, India.

== 14 October ==
List of shipwrecks: 14 October 1856
Ship	State	Description
Friends	United Kingdom	The brig ran aground on the Onrust Bank, in the North Sea off the Dutch coast. She was on a voyage from Newcastle upon Tyne, Northumberland to Middelburg, Zeeland, Netherlands.
Irrawaddy	United Kingdom	The full-rigged ship ran aground and was wrecked on the Blackwater Bank, in the Irish Sea off the coast of Lancashire with the loss of three of her 21 crew. She was on a voyage from Glasgow, Renfrewshire to Rangoon, Burma. Irrawaddy floated off the next day and came ashore at Ballygarrett, County Wexford. She broke in two on 19 October.
Monmouth	United States	The steamship collided with the brig Windward (United States and sank in Chesapeake Bay with the loss of nine of the 24 people on board. She was on a voyage from Baltimore, Maryland to New Orleans, Louisiana.
Vernon	United Kingdom	The Mersey Ferry was run into by a schooner, broke from her mooring and came ashore at Tranmere, Cheshire. She was refloated the next day and returned to service.
William	United Kingdom	The sloop was driven ashore at Hartlepool, County Durham. She was on a voyage from Staithes, Yorkshire to Hartlepool. She was refloated the next day and towed in to Hartlepool.

== 15 October ==
List of shipwrecks: 15 October 1856
Ship	State	Description
Aberdeen, John and Elizabeth, Lavinia, Naples Packet, and Northumberland	United Kingdom	John and Elizabeth, Lavinia, Naples Packet, and Northumberland all broke from their moorings at Wapping, Middlesex and drove upstream in the River Thames. They drove into the steamship Aberdeen which was driven ashore. Several boats, barges, lighters etc were sunk and one person was killed.
Amerika (Америка, 'America')	Imperial Russian Navy	The transport ship ran aground and was wrecked about 1.1 nautical miles (2 km) west of Gogland's southern lighthouse with the loss of 38 of the 115 people on board. She was on a voyage from Kronstadt to Reval.
Eva	United Kingdom	The barque was driven ashore at Seacombe, Cheshire. She was on a voyage from Liverpool, Lancashire to Pärnu, Russia.
Gurli	Sweden	The ship ran aground at Douglas, Isle of Man and was severely damaged. She was on a voyage from Gothenburg to Douglas. She was refloated and found to be leaky.
Hannibal	United Kingdom	The barque ran aground on the Scroby Sands, Norfolk. She was on a voyage from South Shields, County Durham to Alexandria, Egypt. She was refloated and taken in to Great Yarmouth, Norfolk.
John Weir	United Kingdom	The brigantine was driven ashore at Berehaven, County Cork. She was on a voyage from Limerick to London. She was refloated and taken in to Berehaven.

== 16 October ==
List of shipwrecks: 16 October 1856
Ship	State	Description
Walter Cummings	United Kingdom	The schooner was wrecked at Long Beach, New York. Her crew were rescued. She was on a voyage from Smyrna, Delaware to New York City.

== 17 October ==
List of shipwrecks: 17 October 1856
Ship	State	Description
Brothers	United Kingdom	The schooner was driven ashore at Huna, Caithness. She was on a voyage from Wexford to Newcastle upon Tyne, Northumberland. She floated off and consequently sank. Her crew were rescued.
City of Savannah	United States	The steamship sprang a leak and foundered in the Atlantic Ocean off Cape Hatteras, North Carolina. Her crew were rescued by the barque Sylph (United States). City of Savanna was on a voyage from Savannah, Georgia to Baltimore, Maryland.
Southern Belle	United States	The ship was destroyed by fire in the Atlantic Ocean. Her crew were rescued by the barque N. Boynton (United States). Southern Belle was on a voyage from Liverpool, Lancashire, United Kingdom to Boston, Massachusetts.
Union	Duchy of Holstein	The ship was driven ashore on the east coast of Gotland, Sweden. She was on a voyage from Saint Petersburg, Russia to an English port. She was refloated on 19 October and taken in to Visby in a leaky condition.
Wolverton	United Kingdom	The barque was wrecked off Calabar Point, Africa. Her crew were rescued.

== 18 October ==
List of shipwrecks: 17 October 1856
Ship	State	Description
Janet	United Kingdom	The ship was driven ashore at the Tolbukhin Lighthouse. She was on a voyage from Saint Petersburg, Russia to London. She broke up on 26 October.
Royal George	United Kingdom	The ship was driven ashore in the Rio de la Hacha. She was on a voyage from La Guaira to Maracaibo, Venezuela.
Sarah Milledge	United Kingdom	The ship struck the Blonde Rock, off Cape Sable Island, Nova Scotia, British North America. She was abandoned the next day 17 nautical miles (31 km) west south west of Yarmouth, Nova Scotia and was presumed to have foundered.

== 19 October ==
List of shipwrecks: 19 October 1856
Ship	State	Description
Catherina	United Kingdom	The ship ran aground and was wrecked north of Skagen, Denmark. Her crew were rescued. She was on a voyage from Liverpool, Lancashire to Narva, Russia.
Hope	United Kingdom	The ship was driven ashore at Baseleghe, Kingdom of Lombardy–Venetia. She was on a voyage from Havana, Cuba to Trieste. She was refloated on 23 October and taken in to Trieste.
Iris	United Kingdom	The brig was abandoned in the Atlantic Ocean. Her crew were rescued by Charles Thompson (United Kingdom). Iris was on a voyage from Saint John, New Brunswick, British North America to Southampton, Hampshire.

== 20 October ==
List of shipwrecks: 20 October 1856
Ship	State	Description
Anne Vernon	United Kingdom	The steamship ran aground at Neath, Glamorgan. She was on a voyage from Barrow in Furness, Lancashire to Neath.
Auguste	United Kingdom	The ship was driven ashore at King's Lynn, Norfolk. She was on a voyage from Newcastle upon Tyne, Northumberland to King's Lynn. She was refloated and taken in to port.
Canute	United Kingdom	The barque was destroyed by fire at Mauritius.
Endeavour	United Kingdom	The barque was driven ashore at Berwick upon Tweed, Northumberland. She was on a voyage from Callao, Peru to Newcastle upon Tyne. She was refloated on 22 October and taken in to Berwick upon Tweed.
Rising Sun	United Kingdom	The ship was driven ashore at Teignmouth, Devon. She was on a voyage from Newcastle upon Tyne to Teignmouth. She was refloated on 26 October but found to be severely leaky.

== 21 October ==
List of shipwrecks: 21 October 1856
Ship	State	Description
Æronian	United Kingdom	The ship struck the Horse Bank, in Ramsay Sound. She was towed in to "Porthmylgan", where she sank.
Ann	United Kingdom	The ship was wrecked at Cromer, Norfolk.

== 22 October ==
List of shipwrecks: 22 October 1856
Ship	State	Description
Toledo	United States	Carrying 80 passengers and crew on a voyage from Port Washington to Milwaukee, Wisconsin, the steam screw cargo liner was only 110 yards (100 m) from the pier at Port Washington when a sudden storm struck. She attempted to return to the pier but instead ran aground on the coast of Lake Michigan just north of the entrance to the harbor at Port Washington. She sank with the loss of 30 to 40 lives and subsequently broke up. Her wreck lies in 20 feet (6.1 m) of water at 43°23.331′N 087°51.333′W in the Wisconsin Shipwreck Coast National Marine Sanctuary.

== 23 October ==
List of shipwrecks: 23 October 1856
Ship	State	Description
Ann	United Kingdom	The ship ran aground on the Fahludd Reef, off the coast of Sweden. She was on a voyage from Kronstadt, Russia to London. She was refloated and taken in to "Stockruk" in a leaky condition.
Ganymed	Danzig	The ship was driven ashore on Skagen, Denmark. She was on a voyage from Alloa, Clackmannanshire, United Kingdom to Danzig.
Helen	United Kingdom	The ship sprang a leak in the North Sea. She was on a voyage from Glasgow, Renfrewshire to Harburg. She was assisted in to Berwick upon Tweed, Northumberland the next day in a sinking condition.
Lady Franklin	United States	The ship struck a submerged object and sank in the Upper Mississippi River with the loss of six of the 300 people on board.

== 24 October ==
List of shipwrecks: 24 October 1856
Ship	State	Description
Arbutes	United Kingdom	The ship was driven ashore at Chéticamp, Nova Scotia, British North America.
Batavia	(United Kingdom of Great Britain and Ireland) British North America	The schooner was abandoned in the Atlantic Ocean 12 nautical miles (22 km) south east of "Shatchee Isle". Her crew were rescued by the schooner Tradesman (United States). Batavia was towed in to Princetown, New York, United States in a derelict condition on 27 October.
Constitution	United States	The ship was driven ashore at "Hole-in-the-Wall", North Carolina and was abandoned.
Emily	United Kingdom	The schooner sank at Boulogne, Pas-de-Calais, France.
Hull	Danzig	The ship was driven ashore 2 German miles (8.13 nautical miles (15.06 km)) west of Leba, Prussia. Her crew were rescued. She was on a voyage from Danzig to Hartlepool, County Durham, United Kingdom.
Itaska	United Kingdom	The ship was driven ashore at Chéticamp.
Lotus	United Kingdom	The schooner was driven ashore and wrecked at Torcross, Devon. She was on a voyage from London to Santander, Spain.
Macauley	United States	The ship was driven ashore near Smiths Point, New York. She was on a voyage from Baltimore, Maryland to Liverpool, Lancashire, United Kingdom.
Majestic	United Kingdom	The full-rigged ship was driven ashore and wrecked near Pictou, Nova Scotia. She was on a voyage from Liverpool to Prince Edward Island, British North America. She was refloated in November and taken in to Charlottetown, Prince Edward Island.
Prince of Joinville	France	The ship departed from Genoa, Kingdom of Sardinia for Marseille, Bouches-du-Rhône. No further trace, presumed foundered in the Mediterranean Sea with the loss of all hands.
Samuel Jones	United Kingdom	The ship was driven ashore at Chéticamp.
Sphynx	Netherlands	The barque struck the Blackwater Bank, in the Irish Sea off the coast of County Wexford, United Kingdom. She was on a voyage from Liverpool, Lancashire, United Kingdom to Trieste. She was consequently towed in to Kingstown, County Dublin, United Kingdom in a leaky condition by the tug Conqueror (United Kingdom).
Wolfe	(United Kingdom of Great Britain and Ireland) British North America	The ship was driven ashore near Pictou. She was on a voyage from Halifax, Nova Scotia to Restigouche, New Brunswick.

== 25 October ==
List of shipwrecks: 25 October 1856
Ship	State	Description
Dauntless	United Kingdom	The barque was driven ashore and wrecked on Green Island, off Algeciras, Spain. Her crew were rescued.
Gaumrea	Danzig	The ship was driven ashore on Skagen, Denmark. Her crew were rescued. She was on a voyage from Leith, Lothian, United Kingdom to Danzig.
Grouville	(United Kingdom of Great Britain and Ireland) Jersey	The ship was wrecked at "Île au Bois", Labrador, British North America. Her crew were rescued. She was on a voyage from Île au Bois to Cádiz, Spain.
McDonnell	United Kingdom	The ship was driven ashore "near the Pillars". She was on a voyage from Quebec City, Province of Canada, British North America to London. She had been refloated by 3 November and resumed her voyage.

== 26 October ==
List of shipwrecks: 26 October 1856
Ship	State	Description
Avance	Netherlands	The ship was driven ashore on Saaremaa, Russia and abandoned by her crew. She was on a voyage from Pärnu, Russia to a Dutch port.
Endeavour	United Kingdom	The brig caught fire at Drogheda, County Louth and was scuttled.
Espérénce	United Kingdom	The ship was driven ashore near Trélévern, Côtes-du-Nord. She was on a voyage from Sunderland, County Durham, United Kingdom to Hennebont, Morbihan.
Lantao	United States	The clipper departed from Caldera, Chile for Boston, Massachusetts. No further trace, presumed foundered with the loss of all hands.
Lota	United Kingdom	The ship was driven ashore and wrecked at Torcross, Devon.
Thomas and William	United Kingdom	The ship ran aground on the West Rocks, in the North Sea off the coast of Essex. She was refloated and taken in to Harwich in a leaky condition.
Victoria	United Kingdom	The steamship ran aground on Scroby Sands, Norfolk. She was on a voyage from Grimsby, Lincolnshire to Rouen, Seine-Inférieure, France.
West Hoe	United Kingdom	The ship struck the Grysens Rock and was damaged. She was taken in to Penzance, Cornwall in a leaky condition.

== 27 October ==
List of shipwrecks: 27 October 1856
Ship	State	Description
Alleghany	United Kingdom	The steamship sank at Milwaukee, Wisconsin.
Bohemia	United States	The schooner foundered in Lake Michigan off Port Washington, Wisconsin.
Ellerslie	United Kingdom	The ship was driven ashore at Kronstadt, Russia. She was refloated on 24 December.
Frederick Retzloff	Prussia	The barque exploded and sank at Cardiff, Glamorgan, United Kingdom with the loss of three lives, including that of the mate of Pandora (United Kingdom. Several of her crew were severely injured. Frederick Retzloff was loading coal for the return leg of her maiden voyage. She was later refloated; and was towed to Bristol, Gloucestershire, United Kingdom for repairs. She arrived on 2 February 1857.
General Thompson	United States	The schooner was wrecked 4 nautical miles (7.4 km) north of Chicago, Illinois.
Hoffnung	Russia	The sloop was driven ashore and wrecked near Narva with the loss of a crew member.
J. W. Brooks	United States	The steamship foundered in Lake Ontario with the loss of all hands.
J. W. Johnston	United Kingdom	The ship was driven ashore near Narva.
Toledo	United States	The steamship foundered in Lake Michigan off Port Washington with the loss of 40 or the 43 people on board.
Victoria	United Kingdom	The steamship ran aground on the Scroby Sands, Norfolk. She was on a voyage from Grimsby, Lincolnshire to Rouen, Seine-Inférieure, France.
Yonker	United States	The schooner was wrecked on the shores of Lake Michigan. Her crew were rescued.
Zadock Pratt	United States	The barque was driven ashore 12 nautical miles (22 km) from Milwaukee.

== 28 October ==
List of shipwrecks: 28 October 1856
Ship	State	Description
Atkin	United Kingdom	The ship was severely damaged off Aspö, Grand Duchy of Finland. She was taken in to Fredrikshamn in a waterlogged condition and placed under repair.
Despatch	United Kingdom	The ship ran aground at Littleferry, Sutherland. She was on a voyage from Inverness to London.
Helen	United Kingdom	The ship sprang a leak in the North Sea. She was on a voyage from Glasgow, Renfrewshire to Harburg. She was assisted in to Berwick upon Tweed, Northumberland in a sinking condition.
Jackal	United Kingdom	The steamship was wrecked on Hogland, Russia.
Kitty	United Kingdom	The ship was wrecked in the Hemland Straits with the loss of five of her crew. She was on a voyage from Foo Chow Foo to Ningpo, China.
Lord Palmerston	United Kingdom	The full-rigged ship was driven ashore at Kingsdown, Kent. She was on a voyage from Sunderland, County Durham to Mauritius. She was refloated with assistance from a tug and resumed her voyage.
Silas Wright	United States	The ship ran aground at Liverpool, Lancashire, United Kingdom. She was on a voyage from New York City to Liverpool. She was refloated.
Tjalfe	Denmark	The ship was driven ashore 50 wersts (28.80 nautical miles (53.34 km)) east of Reval, Russia. She was on a voyage from Saint Petersburg, Russia to London, United Kingdom. Tjalfe was refloated on 7 November and taken in to Reval.

== 29 October ==
List of shipwrecks: 29 October 1856
Ship	State	Description
Eliza	United Kingdom	The ship ran aground on the Kish Bank, in the Irish Sea. She was on a voyage from Liverpool, Lancashire to Genoa, Kingdom of Sardinia. She was refloated and taken in to Kingstown, County Dublin in a severely leaky condition.
Hungarian	United Kingdom	The ship departed from Liverpool for Philadelphia, Pennsylvania. No further trace, presumed foundered with the loss of all hands.
Superior	United States	The steamship foundered in Lake Superior with the loss of 35 of the 51 people on board. She was on a voyage from Sault Ste. Marie, Province of Canada, British North America to Chicago, Illinois.

== 30 October ==
List of shipwrecks: 30 October 1856
Ship	State	Description
Henry Metcalf	United Kingdom	The ship was driven ashore and wrecked at Syros, Greece. She was on a voyage from Cardiff, Glamorgan to Syros.
Semaphore	United Kingdom	The steamship ran aground near Waterloo, Lancashsire. She was on a voyage from Liverpool, Lancashire to Belfast. She was refloated and resumed her voyage.
Sir William Curtis	United Kingdom	The schooner ran aground and sank at Hayle, Cornwall.

== 31 October ==
List of shipwrecks: 31 October 1856
Ship	State	Description
E. D.	United Kingdom	The ship was wrecked on the Rocas Atoll. She was on a voyage from Pernambuco, Brazil to Liverpool, Lancashire.
Lady Fitzherbert	United Kingdom	The barque was wrecked on "Stenskare", Russia. She was on a voyage from Kronstadt, Russia to Bristol, Gloucestershire.
Lady Franklin	United States	The full-rigged ship was abandoned in the Atlantic Ocean. Her crew were rescued by the schooner Maria Jewett (United States). Lady Franklin was on a voyage from New York to Naples, Kingdom of the Two Sicilies.
Myrtle	United Kingdom	The ship ran aground on Red Island, Province of Canada, British North America. She was on a voyage from Quebec City, Province of Canada to Cork. She was refloated the next day and resumed her voyage.
Queen	United Kingdom	The ship was lost with all hands. She was on a voyage from Calcutta, India to Saugor and then Mauritius.
Sinlair	United Kingdom	The ship was driven ashore on Öland, Sweden. She was on a voyage from Vyborg, Grand Duchy of Finland to Wisbech, Cambridgeshire.

== Unknown date ==
List of shipwrecks: Unknown date in October 1856
Ship	State	Description
Artibus	United States	The schooner was lost in the Bay of St. Lawrence. Crew saved.
Blarney	United Kingdom	The steamship ran aground before 17 October whilst on a voyage from Smyrna to Constantinople, Ottoman Empire. She was refloated.
Bonanza	United Kingdom	The ship was wrecked on a reef east of Saint Domingo. Her crew were rescued. She was on a voyage from Puerto Cabello, Venezuela to Saint Domingo.
Brothers	United Kingdom	The brig was driven ashore south of Cape Spartel, Morocco before 9 October. She was refloated with assistance from HMS Vesuvius (Royal Navy).
Calvert	United States	The ship was abandoned before 20 October.
Chance	United Kingdom	The ship was driven ashore in the Hooghly River.
City of Manchester	United Kingdom	The ship ran aground near the Cape Henelopen Lighthouse, Delaware, United States. Her passengers were taken off. City of Manchester was on a voyage from Liverpool, Lancashire to Philadelphia, Pennsylvania. She was refloated and taken in to Philadelphia, where she arrived on 11 October.
Colonel Cutts	United States	The full-rigged ship was abandoned in the Atlantic Ocean before 20 October. Her crew were rescued by the barque Clymene (United Kingdom). Colonel Cutts was on a voyage from Cardiff, Glamorgan, United Kingdom to New Orleans, Louisiana.
Corinthian	United Kingdom	The ship was abandoned. She was on a voyage from Quebec City, Province of Canada, British North America to Hull, Yorkshire.
Gleaner	United Kingdom	The ship ran aground on the Domesnes Reef, in the Baltic Sea. She was refloated on 1 November and taken in to Bolderāja, Russia.
Havering	United Kingdom	The ship ran aground on the Sumatra Rock, in the Hooghly River before 6 October and was severely damaged.
Horrocks	United Kingdom	The ship was driven ashore. She was on a voyage from Maldon, Essex to Weymouth, Dorset. She was refloated and completed her voyage, arriving on 8 October.
Itaska	United States	The schooner was lost in the Bay of St. Lawrence. Crew saved.
Janet	United Kingdom	The ship was driven ashore at "Tollbukine". She was on a voyage from Kronstadt, Russia to London.
Lawrence Brown	United States	The ship was driven onto the Sumatra Bank, in the Hooghly River.
Levantine	France	The ship was wrecked at "Carabourna", Ottoman Empire.
Maas Nymph	Netherlands	The brig ran aground on the Domesnes Reef. She was refloated on 1 November and taken in to Bolderāja.
Margaret	United Kingdom	The schooner was discovered derelict 10 nautical miles (19 km) west north west of "Egeroen", Norway before 4 October.
Mary W.	United States	The schooner was wrecked at Cape Corrientes, Cuba before 6 October. She was on a voyage from Rio de Janeiro, Brazil to New York.
Mohawk	United Kingdom	The ship was driven ashore on Caribou Island, Province of Canada, British North America before 6 October. Her crew were rescued. She broke up on 15 April 1857.
Prinz von Preussen	Stralsund	The ship departed from Cardiff for Alexandria, Egypt in mid-October. Subsequently foundered in the Atlantic Ocean with the loss of all hands. A chest containing the ships' papers washed up at Morlaix, Finistère, France in March 1857.
Queen	United Kingdom	The ship was driven ashore on Anticosti Island, Nova Scotia, British North America before 10 October. She was on a voyage from Quebec City to Grimsby, Lincolnshire. She was refloated on 13 October and resumed her voyage.
Roderick Dhu	Denmark	The ship was driven ashore on Selsey Bill, Sussex, United Kingdom. She was on a voyage from Santa Cruz to Copenhagen. She was refloated on 17 October and taken in to Portsmouth, Hampshire, United Kingdom.
Wanderer	(United Kingdom of Great Britain and Ireland) Cape Colony	The schooner was wrecked in Plettenberg Bay between 8 and 15 October.
Western Miller	(United Kingdom of Great Britain and Ireland) British North America	The steamship caught fire at Toronto, Province of Canada.
Yeoman	United Kingdom	The ship foundered in the Irish Sea before 21 October. She was on a voyage from Liverpool, Lancashire to Castine, Maine, United States.
Zoe	France	The ship was wrecked on the Domesnes Reef. She was on a voyage from Dunkirk, Nord to Riga, Russia.
Name unknown	Spain	The brig capsized and sank in the North Sea before 9 October. Her crew survived. She was on a voyage from Hamburg to Trondheim, Norway.
