= Ulban Bay =

Bay in the Sea of Okhotsk

- Mercury Bay
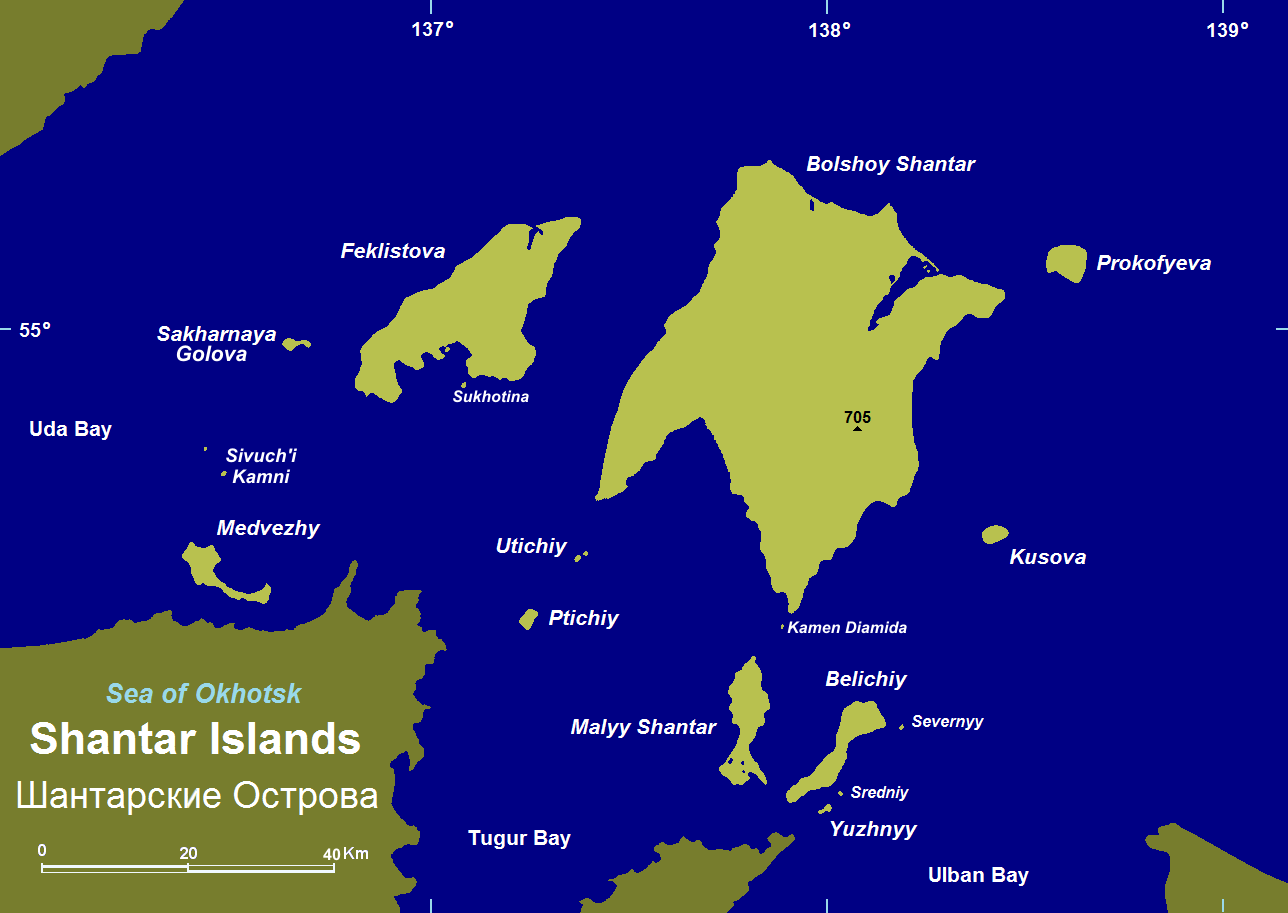
- Location of Ulban Bay south of the Shantar Islands

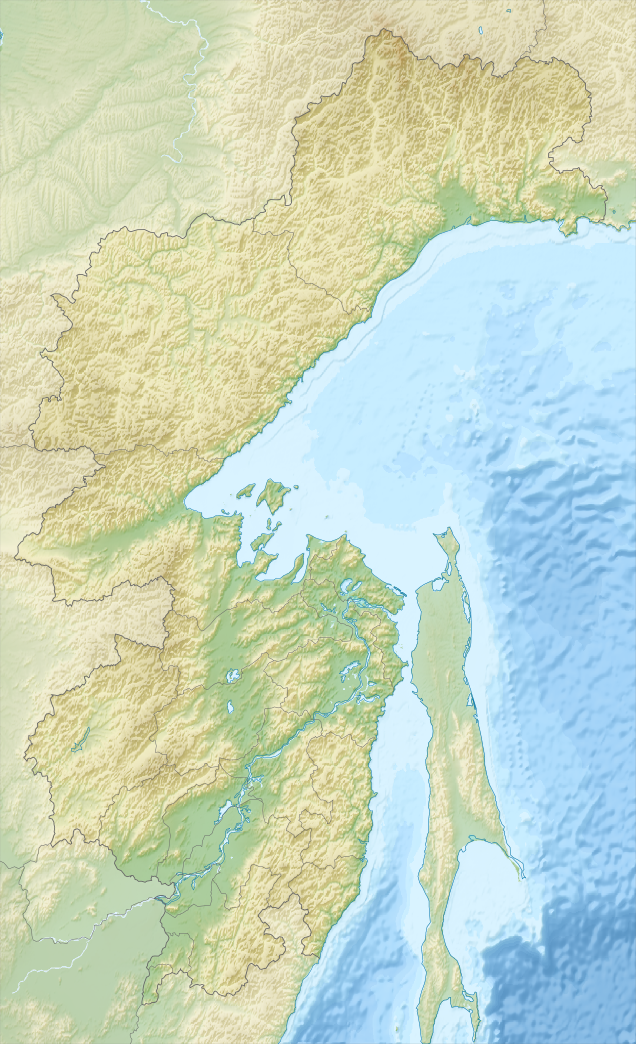
- Location in Khabarovsk Krai
- Location: Russian Far East
- Coordinates: 53°45′N 137°54′E
- River sources: Ulban River, Syran River
- Ocean/sea sources: Sea of Okhotsk
- Basin countries: Russia
- Max. length: 64 km (40 mi)
- Max. width: 43.4 km (27.0 mi)

Ulban Bay (Russian: Ul'bansky Zaliv) is a bay in the northwestern Sea of Okhotsk, just south of the Shantar Islands. It is a southern branch of Academy Bay to the north. The Syran and Ulban rivers flow into its head.

== Geography ==
Ulban Bay is entered between Cape Ukurunru to the west and Cape Tukurgu to the east, which are separated by 43.4 km (about 27 mi). The bay itself is nearly 64 km (40 mi) deep in a southwesterly direction. Ice usually leaves Ulban Bay by mid- or late June, but in some years may remain until August. The bay has no safe anchorage and is exposed to northeast winds. Tides are semidiurnal. Springs rise 4.9 m (16 ft) in the northern part of the bay and 5.4 m (18 ft) in the southern part, while neaps rise about 3 m (9.8 ft). Tidal currents vary from one to two knots. The flood current generally sets to the southwest, while the ebb flows in the opposite direction.

== History ==
Between 1854 and 1885, American whaleships frequented the bay hunting bowhead whales. They called it Mercury or Dimon's Bay, after the ship Mercury (340 tons), of New Bedford, which visited the area during her voyage of 1852–1855, and Francis L. Dimon, her master at the time. They also anchored at the head of the bay to obtain wood and water. On 9 July 1855, the ship Washington (340 tons), of Sag Harbor, was damaged by ice and run ashore, being sold at auction for $400 — the wreck was still visible in October.

Russian schooners and boat crews from Mamga also cruised for bowheads in the bay from 1865 to 1871.

== Wildlife ==
In the summer beluga whales aggregate in the mouths of the Syran and Ulban rivers at the head of Ulban Bay, while bowhead whales are also common in the bay during that time of year. In July 2011, an endangered North Pacific right whale was photographed in the bay – which is considered a vagrant to the region. Waders use the southern part of the bay as a stopover during their summer migration. The most abundant species are Terek sandpiper, Great knot, and wood sandpiper.
