= Cape Ukurunru =

Cape in the western Sea of Okhotsk

Coordinates: 53°58′N 137°51′E

Cape Ukurunru (Russian: Mys Ukurunru) is a cape in the western Sea of Okhotsk. It has sheer cliffs that are grayish-brown in color. It forms the western point to the entrance of Ulban Bay.

== History ==
American whaleships cruised for bowhead whales off the cape between 1855 and 1885. They called it Mercury or Washington Head, the former name after the ship Mercury (340 tons), of New Bedford, which visited the area during her voyage of 1852–1855, and the latter name after the ship Washington (340 tons), of Sag Harbor, which was stove by ice and run ashore near the cape in 1855.
