= Charles Henry Lauchheimer =

- Born: September 22, 1859; Baltimore, Maryland, US
- Died: January 14, 1920 (aged 60); Washington, D.C., US
- Burial place: Arlington National Cemetery
- Education: U.S. Naval Academy 1881; Columbian University Law School 1894
- Military career
- Branch: United States Marine Corps
- Service years: 1883–1920
- Rank: Brigadier General

Charles Henry Lauchheimer was the first Jewish American general officer in the United States Marine Corps and the inspiration for the Lauchheimer Trophy.

== Early life ==
Charles Henry Lauchheimer was born on 22 September 1859, in Baltimore, Maryland, the sixth of Meyer Henry Lauchheimer (a clothing manufacturer) and Babeth Eichberg's 12 children. His parents were from Bavaria, Germany and immigrated to Baltimore, Maryland. He grew up attending Oheb Shalom Synagogue. He graduated Baltimore City College in 1877. He then won a competitive exam given by Congressman Thomas Swann for his appointment to the Naval Academy.

== Military career ==
Lauchheimer graduated in the top fourth of his class from the Naval Academy in 1881. He was commissioned in the Marine Corps in 1883 after a two-year cadet cruise on the USS Richmond. Second Lieutenant Lauchheimer was sent to the Brooklyn Navy Yard's Marine Barracks. He was then the commander of the Marine detachment of the USS Ossippee, home ported in Philadelphia.

Returning from sea duty, he attended Navy Torpedo school and the Naval War College in 1887. In 1890 he was promoted to First Lieutenant and commanded the Marine detachment on the USS Enterprise.

In 1892, Lauchheimer was assigned to the Judge Advocate General of the Navy and he was sent to Columbian University law school (known today as George Washington University Law School). In February 1899, he was promoted to captain and in March President William McKinley nominated him as the assistant adjutant and inspector of the Marine Corps and he was promoted to major.

Lauchheimer was the first Marine officer to be in charge of marksmanship and he was determined to see it improved. He constructed or improved live fire ranges, encouraged competitive marksmanship programs and joined the National Rifle Association’s board of directors in 1900.

In 1903, he would be promoted to Lt. Colonel and sent to Manila to create the office of Adjutant and Inspector of the Marine Corps in the Far East.

In 1904, he returned to the United States and was promoted to colonel and made the Adjutant and Inspector of the Marine Corps.

In 1910, Lauchheimer and a number of other top Marine officers had a personal disagreement with the Commandant George F. Elliot, ending in a censure of all the officers including Elliot. Lauchheimer was sent to the Philippines afterwards and Elliot was allowed to retire.

On 8 September 1918, President Woodrow Wilson made Lauchheimer the first Jewish general officer in United States Marine Corps history.

Lauchheimer Trophy Award in Gold

The Lauchheimer Trophy is displayed during the 2015 U.S. Marine Corps Matches on Stone Bay Rifle Range, Camp Lejeune, N.C., April 16, 2015.

As World War I began, Brigadier General Lauchheimer was in charge of recruitment. The Marine Corps refused draftees and had 239,274 applicants for the 60,189 needed recruits.

== Death ==
Wilson awarded Lauchheimer with the Navy Distinguished Service Medal. Lauchheimer would never receive it as he suffered a stroke in July 1919 on an inspection tour and fell into a coma and died on 14 January 1920 ath the Naval Hospital in Washington, D.C. He is buried in Arlington National Cemetery.

Lauchheimer Trophy Award in Silver

== Marksmanship award ==
After his death, his siblings worked to establish a shooting medal in his honor and the Commandant George Barnett endorsed the idea and the Lauchheimer Trophy for Annual Competition in Small Arms Firing was established in 1921.

== Author ==
- Naval Courts and Naval Law (1896)
- Forms of Procedure for Naval Courts and Boards (1902)
