= USS Dixie (1893) =

Tender of the United States Navy

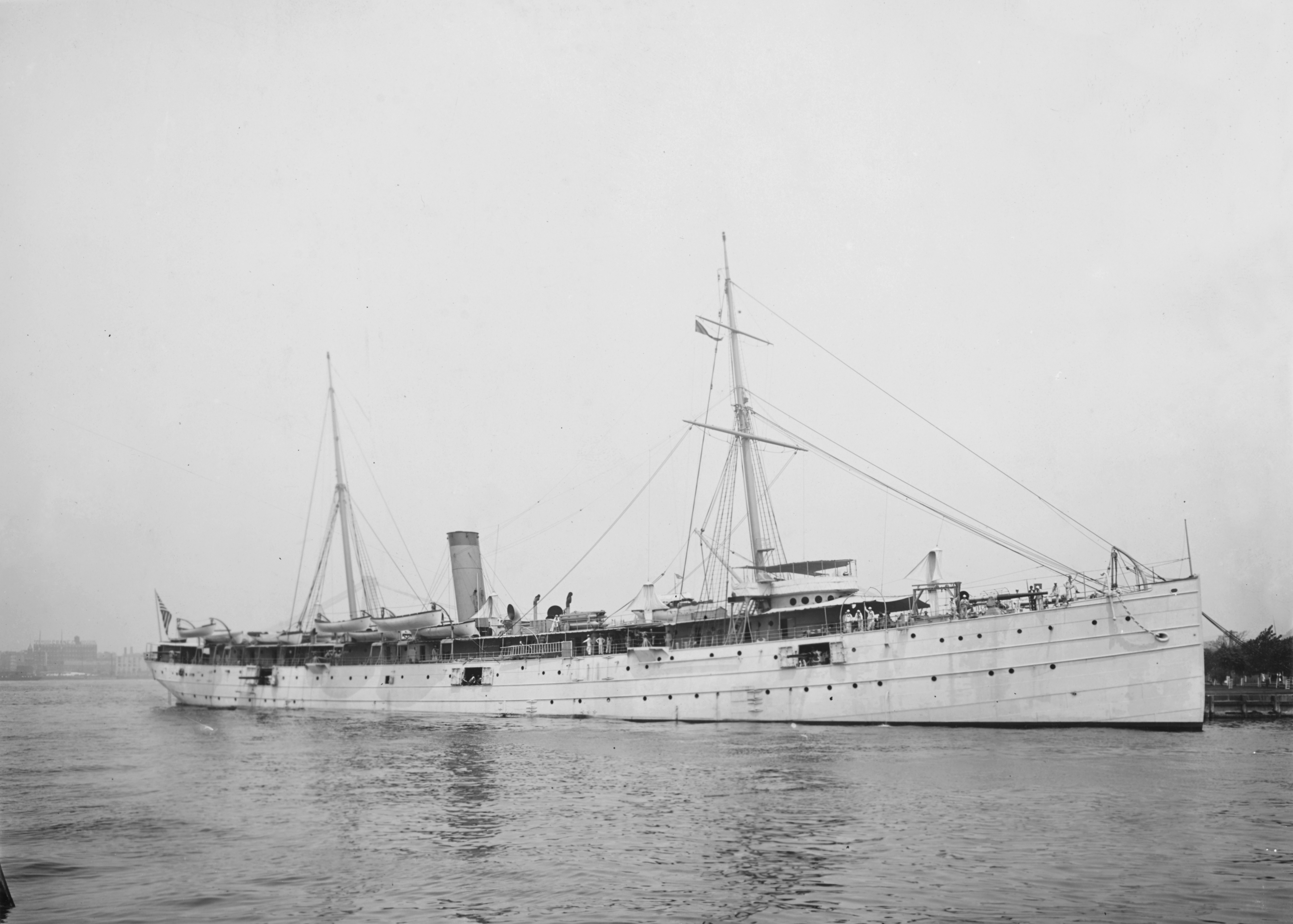
- USS Dixie

History

United States
- Name: USS Dixie
- Builder: Newport News Shipbuilding and Dry Dock Co., Newport News, Virginia
- Laid down: 1893, as El Rio
- Acquired: by purchase, 15 April 1898
- Commissioned: 19 April 1898
- Decommissioned: 7 March 1899
- Recommissioned: 15 November 1899
- Decommissioned: 21 July 1902
- Recommissioned: 1 October 1903
- Decommissioned: 23 October 1905
- Recommissioned: 2 June 1906
- Decommissioned: 1 November 1907
- Recommissioned: 2 February 1909
- Decommissioned: 30 June 1922
- Reclassified: AD-1, 17 July 1920
- Motto: Fight With Our Lives So People Can Live
- Fate: Sold for scrapping, 25 September 1922

General characteristics
- Type: Auxiliary cruiser / Destroyer tender
- Displacement: 6,114 long tons (6,212 t)
- Length: 405 ft 9 in (123.67 m)
- Beam: 48 ft 3 in (14.71 m)
- Draft: 20 ft (6.1 m)
- Speed: 14 knots (26 km/h; 16 mph)
- Complement: 224 officers and enlisted
- Armament: 10 × 3 in (76 mm) guns

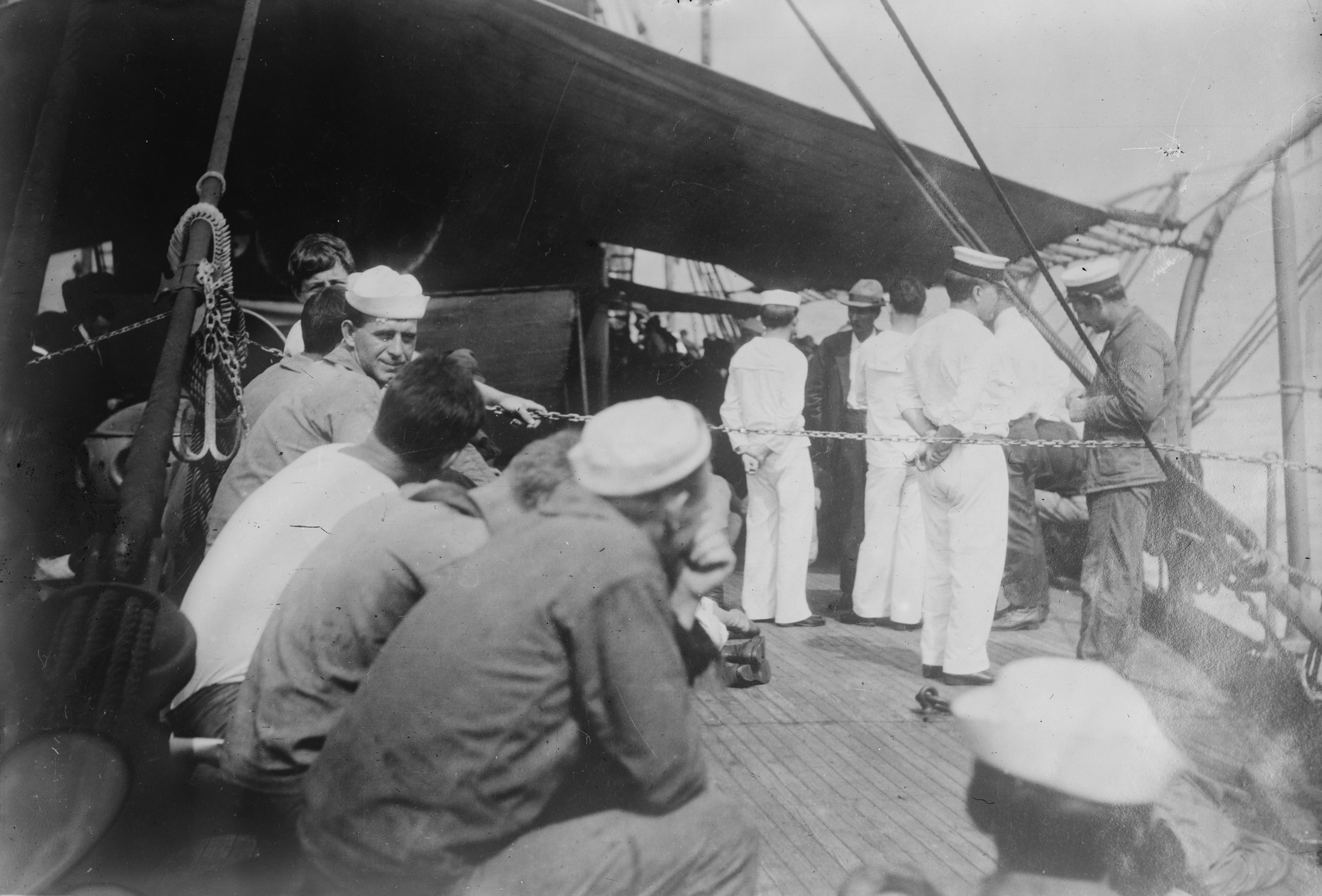
Picking up refugees from the Mexican Revolution circa 1915

The first USS Dixie (later AD-1) was a United States Navy auxiliary cruiser and later a destroyer tender. The Dixie was the first ship of the United States Navy to have this name.

She was built as the steam brig El Rio in 1893 by Newport News Shipbuilding and Dry Dock Co., Newport News, Virginia for the Southern Pacific Railroad's Morgan Line. El Rio was purchased by the Navy 15 April 1898, converted to an auxiliary cruiser by her builder, and commissioned 19 April 1898, Commander Charles Henry Davis, Jr. in command.

== Service history ==
=== Spanish–American War, 1898–99 ===
Dixie stood out of Hampton Roads, 11 June 1898, and arrived at Santiago de Cuba on 19 June. Attached to Eastern Squadron, North Atlantic Fleet, she cruised in the West Indies during the Spanish–American War on blockade duty and convoying Army transports. During 27 and 28 July, she participated in the capture of Ponce, Puerto Rico, landing an armed force which received the surrender of the towns of Ponce and La Playa. She sailed from Guantánamo Bay, Cuba, 24 August and arrived at Philadelphia 22 September, where she was placed out of commission 7 March 1899. Between 15 March and 15 July she was on loan to the War Department for use as a transport.

=== Training ship, 1899–1902 ===
Recommissioned 15 November 1899, Dixie began service as a training ship for recruits. From 17 December 1899 to 8 August 1900, she sailed to the West Indies, the Mediterranean, through the Suez Canal to the Philippines, where she transferred men to the base at Cavite, returning to the United States by the same route. Another training cruise was made from 29 September 1900 to 28 February 1901, during which she visited the Azores, Madeira, Gibraltar, and Mediterranean ports returning by way of the West Indies and La Guaira, Venezuela, to Norfolk. She transferred men and stores to the South Atlantic Station between 7 May and 3 July 1901, then made another training cruise to northern European waters and the Mediterranean between 24 July 1901 and 7 May 1902. From 14 May to 6 June 1902 she was on special duty, transporting provisions and supplies for the relief of victims of the volcanic eruptions of La Soufrière, St. Vincent and Mount Pelée, Martinique in the West Indies. She went out of commission at New York Navy Yard on 21 July 1902.

=== Caribbean Squadron, 1903–1907 ===
Dixie was recommissioned 1 October 1903 and joined the Caribbean Squadron, North Atlantic Fleet. She served principally as a transport on the east coast, in the Caribbean, and the Panama Canal Zone, carrying Marines, recruits for training, and drafts of men for other vessels as well as engaging in target practice for her crew and Reserves. Assigned to the Special Service Squadron she steamed from Philadelphia 26 June 1905 to carry a party of scientists to the Mediterranean to observe the solar eclipse of 30 August. She arrived at Bône, Algeria, 21 July, and established Eclipse Station No. 2 for these observations. Returning to Philadelphia 13 October, she was returned to a noncommissioned status 10 days later. In commission again from 2 June 1906 to 1 November 1907, she transported Marines and stores to the Caribbean and cruised in that area to protect American interests.

=== Destroyer Tender, 1909–1922 ===
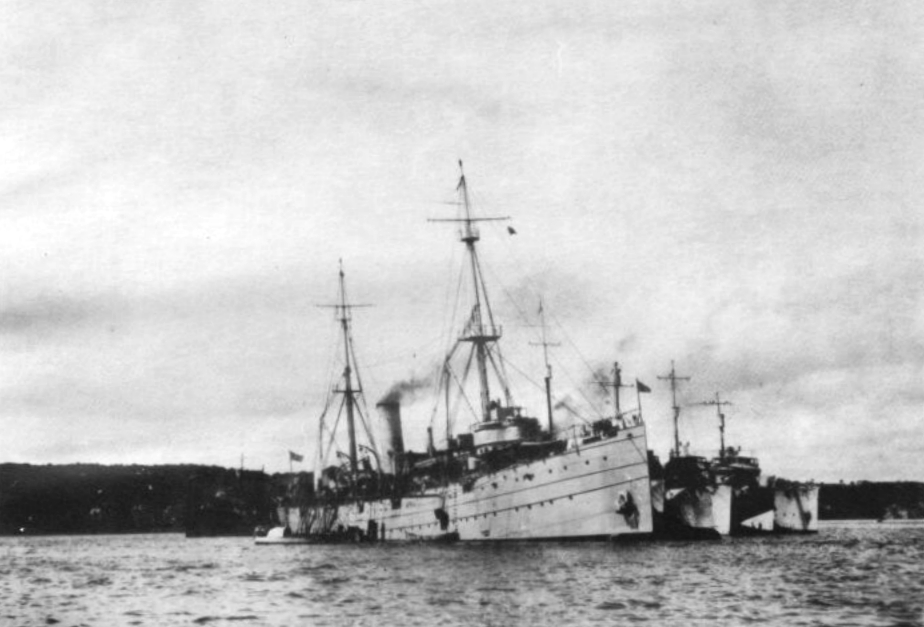
Dixie at anchor with destroyers.

She remained out of commission until 2 February 1909 when she was assigned as tender to Atlantic Torpedo Flotilla and Destroyer Squadron, Atlantic Fleet. She cruised on the east coast, in the Caribbean, and in the Gulf of Mexico in this service. In addition to her tender duty, she towed submarines; transported Marines and crews for other ships; carried the Nicaraguan expeditionary force to Colón, C.Z., and took part in the operations off Mexico during April and May 1914, transporting supplies and refugees from 1914 to 1915. She returned to Philadelphia 16 December 1915.

From 18 June 1916 to 6 May 1917, Dixie served as tender for Destroyer Force, Atlantic Fleet; engaged in gunnery exercises with destroyers and maneuvers with the fleet; delivered stores and mail; transported refugees from Mexico to Galveston, Texas, and served as tender to Squadron 4, Patrol Force, at Key West.

With American entry into World War I, Dixie departed Philadelphia 31 May 1917 to join U.S. naval forces operating in European waters. Arriving at Queenstown, Ireland, 12 June, she served as tender for American destroyers based at that port until 15 December 1918, except for a period of similar duty at Berehaven (21 June – 27 August 1917). Returning to Philadelphia 22 February 1919, Dixie served as tender to destroyer flotillas operating on the east coast, and in the Caribbean. On 24 February 1919, Dixie ran aground shortly after putting out of Kingston, Jamaica. She was pulled free by USS Bridgeport, and was able to continue on with the destroyer force to Guantánamo Bay.

Classified AD-1 on 17 July 1920 she arrived at Philadelphia 16 July to tend the destroyers in reserve at Philadelphia Navy Yard. From 6 April 1921 to 17 May 1922 she was again tender to Destroyer Squadrons Atlantic Fleet, cruising along the east coast from New York to Charleston, South Carolina. Dixie was decommissioned 30 June 1922 and sold 25 September of the same year.
