= Konstantina Bay =

Bay in the Sea of Okhotsk

Coordinates: 54°04′52″N 137°22′44″E

Konstantina Bay (Russian: Zaliv Konstantina) is a small bay in the northwestern Sea of Okhotsk, just south of the Shantar Islands. It is a western branch of the larger Academy Bay to the east. The bay is about 9.6 km (6 mi) in diameter and its entrance is about 4.8 km (3 mi) wide. Spring tides rise 3.8 m (12.5 ft), while neaps rise 2.7 m (9 ft).

== Flora and fauna ==
The bay's shores are covered with fir, larch, pine, birch, and various other species of trees. Waders use the southern part of Konstantina Bay as a stopover during their summer migration. The most abundant species is Terek sandpiper.

== History ==
It was frequented by American and Russian whaleships targeting bowhead whales between 1854 and 1885. The former called it Taylor's Bay, after J. Taylor, captain of the ship Maria Theresa (330 tons), of New Bedford, who frequented the area in the early 1850s.
