= Steam brig =

A steam brig is a two-masted sailing ship with auxiliary steam power. The key advantage was that the ship could sail up-wind and it could use the steam power to move relative to the wind for an advantageous sailing angle.

In practice, the disadvantages combined rather than the advantages. The type had great wind-resistance, leading to an increased use of fuel up-wind compared to a pure steam ship. At the same time, the requirement to store coal reduced the cargo space over that of a sailing ship. It thus combined the slow speed, high maintenance and poor righting (ability to resist capsize and wind) of a sailing ship with the small cargo space and fuel expense of a steam ship.

The ship was typically abbrievated as StBrig - steam brig.

== Examples ==
A prominent early example was the steam brig New York, built at Newcastle Street, Norfolk, Va., in 1821.

A British example was the Sunniside, an 1830s cargo vessel.

== See also ==
- sail-plan
- rigging
- sailing ship
- steam ship
