= Mamga Bay =

Bay in Khabarovsk Krai, Russia

- Бухта Мамга (Russian)
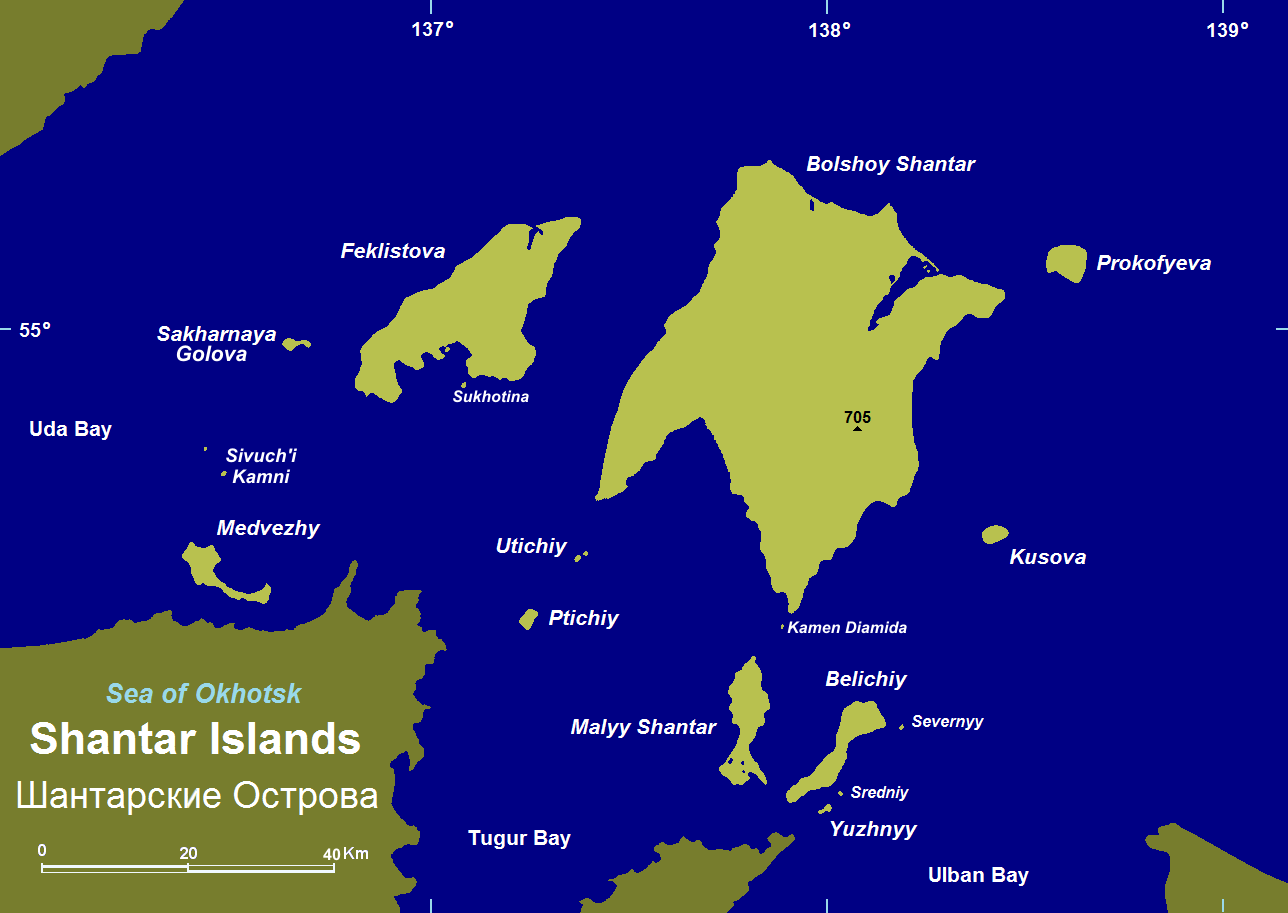
- Mamga Bay is located in the northwestern part of Tugur Bay, south of the Shantar Islands

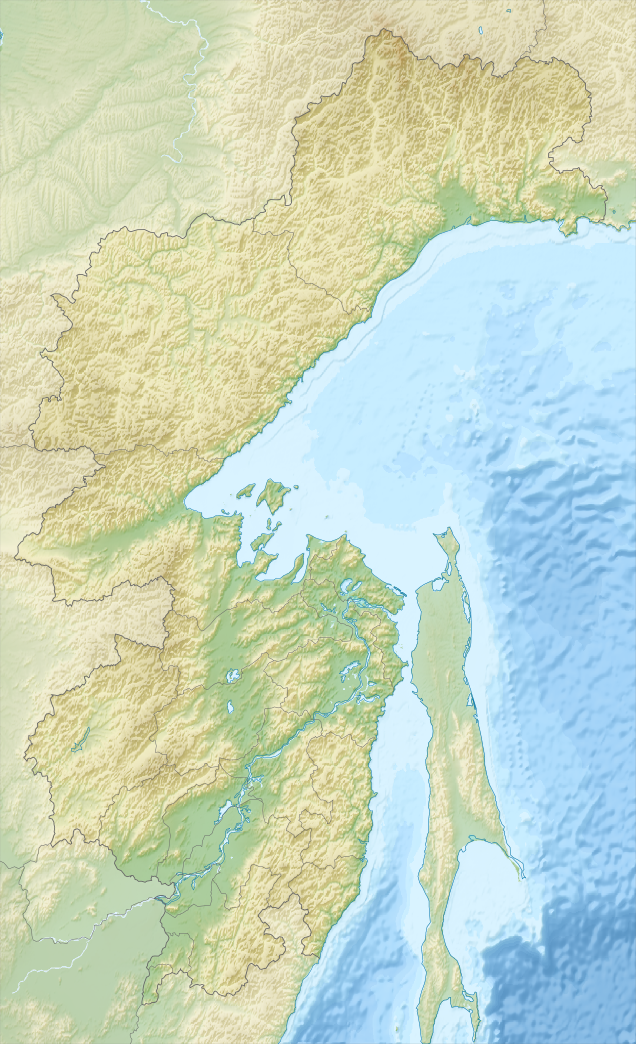
- Location in Khabarovsk Krai
- Location: Russian Far East
- Coordinates: 54°24′N 136°46′E
- River sources: Mamga River
- Ocean/sea sources: Sea of Okhotsk
- Basin countries: Russia
- Max. length: 3 km (1.9 mi)
- Max. width: 8 km (5.0 mi)

Mamga Bay (Russian: Бухта Мамга, Bukhta Mamga) is a bay in the Tuguro-Chumikansky District of Khabarovsk Krai, Russian Federation.

Beluga whales are frequently seen in the bay.

== Geography ==
Mamga Bay is a small bay located on the northwestern side of Tugur Bay. It lies in the northwestern Sea of Okhotsk. The bay is open to the south and a small river, the Mamga, flows into it from the west.

== History ==
New London and Hawaiian whaling schooners wintered in Mamga Bay from 1856 to 1862. They called it Caroline Harbor, after the schooner Caroline (106 tons), which was the first to winter there in 1856–1857. The four crew left with her all died of scurvy. These schooners acted as tenders to barques, which sent boat crews ahead in the early summer with provisions to cruise for bowhead whales with the schooners before the ships were able to work their way through the ice to Tugur Bay.

In the summer of 1862 the Russian-American Company (RAC) established a whaling station on the tip of the peninsula that forms the eastern side of the bay. Under the command of a Captain Elfsberg of the Imperial Navy, the two schooners Ayan and Caroline obtained 2,700 bbls of whale oil and 31,000 lbs of whalebone between 1863 and 1865. In 1865 the station and one of the schooners, the Caroline, were sold to Otto Wilhelm Lindholm, who operated another station at the head of Tugur Bay. With the Caroline and another schooner, the Hannah Rice (160 tons), purchased the following year, Lindholm cruised for bowhead whales in Tugur Bay and in adjacent bays and gulfs.

Whales were towed to the station, where they were flensed on the beach and their blubber rendered into oil at a tryworks on the point. A chartered vessel from Nikolayevsk took aboard the oil and bone at the end of the season to either Honolulu or San Francisco. Lindholm and his men wintered in the houses abandoned by the RAC, while the schooners were hauled up onto the riverbank at the mouth of the Mamga River to protect them from being damaged by the ice. In 1870 and 1871 he took down two of the houses on the point and loaded them onto one of his schooners and sailed to Nakhodka for the winter, leaving subordinates in command of the station. Lindholm last mentioned using the station for whaling in 1876, when he sent his steam-brig Sibir to pick up the catch there, but it was visited by the Sibir again in 1879 and 1883.

American whaleships visited Mamga to sell goods and receive repairs from ice damage.
