= List of shipwrecks in October 1858 =

The list of shipwrecks in October 1858 includes ships sunk, foundered, wrecked, grounded, or otherwise lost during October 1858.

== 1 October ==
List of shipwrecks: 1 October 1858
| Ship | State | Description |
|---|---|---|
| Perle | Kingdom of Hanover | The galiot collided with the schooner Laura Ann (United Kingdom) and sank in the North Sea between the Dudgeon Sandbank and Flamborough Head, Yorkshire, United Kingdom. Her crew were rescued by the schooner Wave (United Kingdom). Perle was on a voyage from King's Lynn, Norfolk to Middlesbrough, Yorkshire. |
| Reuste | Stettin | The ship ran aground on the Droogden, in the Baltic Sea and was damaged. She was on a voyage from Stettin to Hull, Yorkshire. She was refloated and put in to Copenhagen, Denmark in a leaky condition. |
| Rose | United Kingdom | The ship driven ashore on Lamb Holm, Orkney Islands. She was refloated on 3 October and taken in to Stromness, Orkney Islands. |

== 2 October ==
List of shipwrecks: 2 October 1858
| Ship | State | Description |
|---|---|---|
| Devon | United Kingdom | The brig foundered in the North Sea 6 nautical miles (11 km) east of the Dudgeon Lightship ( Trinity House) with the loss of one of her six crew. Survivors were rescued by Charles (United Kingdom). |
| Emily | United Kingdom | The ship was driven ashore and wrecked at Port Eynon. Glamorgan. |
| Immanuel | Russia | The brig foundered in the Kattegat. Her crew were rescued. She was on a voyage from Cardiff, Glamorgan to Kronstadt. |
| Louisa Margaretha | United Kingdom | The brig ran aground and was wrecked north east of Læsø, Denmark. She was on a voyage from Hartlepool, County Durham to Danzig. |
| Welhelmine | Flag unknown | The schooner was driven ashore on "Starholm". She was on a voyage from Hull, Yorkshire, United Kingdom to a Finnish port. |

== 3 October ==
List of shipwrecks: 3 October 1858
| Ship | State | Description |
|---|---|---|
| Anne | United Kingdom | The ship was driven ashore at Agger, Denmark. She was on a voyage from Cardiff, Glamorgan to Kronstadt, Russia. She broke up on 8 October. |
| Queen | United Kingdom | The ship departed from Puerto Plata, Dominican Republic for Liverpool, Lancashire. No further trace, presumed foundered with the loss of all hands. |
| Stella | Sweden | The barque was wrecked on Skagen, Denmark. She was on a voyage from Cimbritshamn to Grimsby, Lincolnshire, United Kingdom. |
| Union | United Kingdom | The ship ran aground on the Aberlady Sands, off the coast of Perthshire. She was on a voyage from Leith, Lothian to North Sunderland, County Durham. |
| Wolf | (United Kingdom of Great Britain and Ireland) British North America | The barque was wrecked at Port Hood, Nova Scotia with the loss of all but her captain. |

== 4 October ==
List of shipwrecks: 4 October 1858
| Ship | State | Description |
|---|---|---|
| North Star | United Kingdom | The full-rigged ship was wrecked on the Pratas Shoal, in the South China Sea . |
| Superior | United Kingdom | The brig foundered in the North Sea. Her crew were rescued by the barque Margaret Anderson (Norway). Superior was on a voyage from Sunderland, County Durham to Amsterdam, North Holland, Netherlands. |

== 5 October ==
List of shipwrecks: 5 October 1858
| Ship | State | Description |
|---|---|---|
| A. Z. | United States | The full-rigged ship was abandoned in the Atlantic Ocean. All 94 people on board were rescued by Morning Star (United Kingdom). A.Z. was on a voyage from New York, United States to Glasgow, Renfrewshire. |
| Warrior | United Kingdom | The ship departed from Lerwick, Shetland Islands for Sunderland, County Durham. No further trace, presumed foundered with the loss of all hands. |

== 6 October ==
List of shipwrecks: 6 October 1858
| Ship | State | Description |
|---|---|---|
| Ann | United Kingdom | The Humber Keel sank at Whitby, Yorkshire. Her crew were rescued. She was on a voyage from Runswick Bay to Whitby. |
| John and Edward | United Kingdom | The schooner was driven onto the breakwater at Holyhead, Anglesey. She was on a voyage from Bangor, Caernarfonshire to Maldon, Essex. She had broken up by 11 October. |
| Mary Ann | United Kingdom | The ship sank off Whitby. |
| Minerva | United Kingdom | The schooner was wrecked on the Conister Rock, in Douglas Bay. She was on a voyage from Dublin to Whitehaven, Cumberland. |
| William Clowes | United Kingdom | The sloop was wrecked at "Rossdale". She was on a voyage from "Rossdale" to South Shields, County Durham. |

== 7 October ==
List of shipwrecks: 7 October 1858
| Ship | State | Description |
|---|---|---|
| Albion | United Kingdom | The sloop foundered at Lerwick, Shetland Islands. |
| Barbara | United Kingdom | The sloop was driven ashore and wrecked at Lerwick. |
| Castilian Maid | United Kingdom | The schooner foundered off Lindesnes, Norway. Her crew were rescued by Charles (United Kingdom). Castilian Maid was on a voyage from Wick, Caithness to Stettin. |
| Catherine | United Kingdom | The sloop was driven ashore and wrecked at Lerwick. |
| Cygnet | United Kingdom | The sloop was driven ashore at Lerwick. Her crew were rescued. |
| Elizabeth Barclay | United Kingdom | The ship run ashore 5 nautical miles (9.3 km) east of Findhorn, Moray. She was on a voyage from Thurso, Caithness to Dingwall, Ross-shire. |
| Favourite | United Kingdom | The sloop was driven ashore and wrecked at Lerwick. |
| Fly | United Kingdom | The sloop was driven ashore at Scalloway, Shetland Islands. |
| Fox | United Kingdom | The sloop was driven ashore and wrecked between Cairnbulg and Fraserburgh, Aberdeenshire. Her crew were rescued. She was on a voyage from Thurso, Caithness to Stonehaven, Aberdeenshire. |
| George Robinson | United Kingdom | The brig was wrecked on the Gunfleet Sand, in the North Sea off the coast of Essex. Her crew were rescued. |
| Henry Porcher | United Kingdom | The ship was wrecked on rocks at "Pennyland", Caithness. She was on a voyage from Quebec City, Province of Canada, British North America to Grangemouth, Stirlingshire. |
| Hopewell | United Kingdom | The ship was abandoned in Penzance Bay. She was on a voyage from Porthleven, Cornwall to Hull, Yorkshire. She was taken in to Porthleven the next day. |
| James Trail | United Kingdom | The schooner was driven ashore and wrecked at Fraserburgh. All five people on board had been taken off shortly before. She was on a voyage from Thurso, Caithness to Port Dundas, Renfrewshire. |
| Jane Anna | (United Kingdom of Great Britain and Ireland) Isle of Man | The smack was driven ashore and capsized at Maryport, Cumberland with the loss of one of her three crew. She was on a voyage from Ramsey, Isle of Man to Maryport. |
| Jemima | United Kingdom | The barque was wrecked on the Newcombe Sand, in the North Sea off the coast of Suffolk. Her eight crew were rescued by the Pakefield Lifeboat. |
| John Wilson | United Kingdom | The ship was driven ashore at "Pewtermint", Dumfriesshire. She was on a voyage from Quebec City, Province of Canada, British North America to Dumfries. She floated off and was driven onto the Blackshaw Bank, in the Solway Firth. She was refloated the next day and beached at Glencastle, Dumfriesshire. |
| Millennium | United Kingdom | The sloop was driven ashore and wrecked at Peterhead, Aberdeenshire. Her crew were rescued. She was on a voyage from Sunderland, County Durham to Buckie, Aberdeenshire. |
| Mirzapore | United Kingdom | The barque was wrecked on the Sugar Key, in the Bahama Channel. She was on a voyage from Liverpool, Lancashire to Havana, Cuba. |
| Morriston | United Kingdom | The ship driven ashore and wrecked at Plymouth, Devon. |
| Orient | United Kingdom | The paddle tug sprang a leak and foundered in the Mediterranean Sea. Her crew survived. She was on a voyage from Gibraltar to Malta and Constantinople, Ottoman Empire. |
| Patria | United Kingdom | The barque ran aground and was wrecked at Lyngør, Denmark. She was on a voyage from Copenhagen, Denmark to Dundee, Forfarshire. |
| Roe | United Kingdom | The ship was driven ashore 3 nautical miles (5.6 km) north of Helsingør, Denmark. She was on a voyage from Danzig to Lossiemouth, Morayshire. |
| Sarah Ann Ruskell | United Kingdom | The schooner sank at Salt Island, Anglesey. She was on a voyage from Arklow, County Wicklow to Liverpool, Lancashire. |
| Thornaby | United Kingdom | The schooner was driven ashore at Lindisfarne, Northumberland. She was on a voyage from Montrose, Forfarshire to Sunderland, County Durham. She was refloated. |
| Vivacious | United Kingdom | The sloop was driven ashore at Lerwick. She was refloated. |
| Vrouw Wicherdina | Netherlands | The galiot was driven ashore and wrecked on Skagen, Denmark. Her crew were rescued. She was on a voyage from Hartlepool, County Durham to Königsberg, Prussia. |
| Waterloo | United Kingdom | The ship ran aground on the Sillicar Rocks, on the coast of Northumberland. All on board were rescued. She was on a voyage from Hartlepool, County Durham to Grangemouth, Stirlingshire. She floated off, but consequently sank 2 nautical miles (3.7 km) east of Berwick upon Tweed, Northumberland. |
| Zemira | Grand Duchy of Tuscany | The barque was wrecked on the Newcombe Sand with the loss of six lives. Eight survivors were rescued by the Pakefield Lifeboat. She was on a voyage from Newcastle upon Tyne, Northumberland to Livorno. |

== 8 October ==
List of shipwrecks: 8 October 1858
| Ship | State | Description |
|---|---|---|
| Agnes | United Kingdom | The ship ran aground on a sandbank off Brielle, South Holland, Netherlands. She was on a voyage from Great Yarmouth, Norfolk to Rotterdam, South Holland. |
| Catherina | Russia | The ship was driven ashore at Ventspils. She was refloated on 11 October and taken in to Ventspils for repairs. |
| Delight | United Kingdom | The sloop ran aground off Chapel Island, Lancashire and was wrecked with the loss of two of her six crew. She was on a voyage from Ulverston, Lancashire to Birkenhead, Cheshire. |
| Fortuna | Greifswald | The brig was wrecked at Fraserburgh, Aberdeenshire, United Kingdom. Her crew were rescued by the Coast Guard using rocket apparartus and breeches buoy. She was on a voyage from Danzig to Holyhead, Anglesey, United Kingdom. |
| Jules | France | The ship abandoned in Penzance Bay with the loss of her five crew. She was subsequently towed in to Penzance, Cornwall. |
| Osprey | United States | The schooner was driven ashore and wrecked at Oswego, New York with the loss of four lives. She was on a voyage from Racine, Wisconsin to Buffalo, New York. |

== 9 October ==
List of shipwrecks: 9 October 1858
| Ship | State | Description |
|---|---|---|
| Beroza | United Kingdom | The ship was driven ashore 2 nautical miles (3.7 km) east of Almería, Spain. She was on a voyage from Sunderland, County Durham to Alicante, Spain. She was refloated and resumed her voyage. |
| Harbinger | United Kingdom | The brig sprang a leak and sank in the North Sea. Her crew were rescued by Aant Johannes (Netherlands). Harbinger was on a voyage from Grangemouth, Stirlingshire to Stettin. |
| Hercules | United States | The steamship exploded at Ogdensburg, New York with the loss of eleven lives. |
| Mary | United Kingdom | The schooner was wrecked at Balbriggan, County Dublin. Her crew were rescued by the Skerries Lifeboat. |
| Mary | United Kingdom | The schooner was drivern ashore at Sandhaven, Aberdeenshire. She was on a voyage from Sandhaven to Newcastle upon Tyne, Northumberland. |
| Norman | United Kingdom | The brig was abandoned in the North Sea 60 nautical miles (110 km) off Lowestoft, Suffolk. Her crew were rescued by the brig Eleanor (United Kingdom). Norman was on a voyage from South Shields, County Durham to the Nieuw Diep. Norman was taken in to Lowestoft on 2 November with the assistance of the smacks Caroline, Jane, Martha and Viper, and the tug Robert Owen (all (United Kingdom). |
| Sophie | France | The chasse-marée ran aground on the Longsand, in the North Sea off the coast of Essex, United Kingdom. She was refloated with the assistance of several smacks and taken in to Harwich, Essex. |
| Triumph | (United Kingdom of Great Britain and Ireland) British North America | The schooner was driven ashore and wrecked at Belle Isle, Newfoundland. Her crew survived. |

== 10 October ==
List of shipwrecks: 10 October 1858
| Ship | State | Description |
|---|---|---|
| Alice | United Kingdom | The ship was driven ashore at Trefusis, Cornwall. She was on a voyage from Falmouth, Cornwall to Liverpool, Lancashire. She was refloated and put back to Falmouth. |
| Ardwell | United Kingdom | The ship was driven ashore on the Lowlight Sands, on the coast of County Durham. She was refloated and taken in to South Shields. |
| Clio | United Kingdom | The ship ran aground on the Roar Sand. She was on a voyage from South Shields to Shoreham-by-Sea, Sussex. She was refloated and put in to Ramsgate, Kent in a leaky condition. |
| Dandy | United Kingdom | The tug sank at Falmouth, Cornwall. |
| Friends | United Kingdom | The brig was in collision with the steamship Helena and sank in the River Thames at Gravesend, Kent. She was on a voyage from South Shields to London. |
| Johannes | Bremen | The ship ran aground off "Norre Lynvig", Denmark and was wrecked. Her crew were rescued. She was on a voyage from Geestemünde to Middlesbrough, North Riding of Yorkshire, United Kingdom. |
| Margaret | United Kingdom | The schooner was damaged by fire at Belfast, County Antrim. |
| Margaret | United Kingdom | The schooner was driven ashore and wrecked at Ness Point, Suffolk. Her crew were rescued. She was on a voyage from Sunderland, County Durham to Southampton, Hampshire. She was refloated on 15 October and towed in to Lowestoft. |
| Mary Anne | United Kingdom | The sloop was driven on to the North Rock, in the Belfast Lough. She was on a voyage from Dundalk, County Louth to Glasgow, Renfrewshire. |
| Ryhope | United Kingdom | The brig ran aground at "Sandhale", Lincolnshire. She was on a voyage from Hartlepool, County Durham to London. She was refloated and taken in to Grimsby, Lincolnshire in a leaky condition. |
| Sunshine | United Kingdom | The schooner wrecked on the Newcombe Sand, in the North Sea off the coast of Suffolk. All on board survived. She was on a voyage from Totnes, Devon to Sunderland. The wreck drove ashore at Pakefield, Suffolk the next day. |
| X. L. | United Kingdom | The smack foundered in the Irish Sea. Her crew were rescued by the fishing smack Syren (United Kingdom). X. L. was on a voyage from Ardrossan, Ayrshire to Runcorn, Cheshire. |

== 11 October ==
List of shipwrecks: 11 October 1858
| Ship | State | Description |
|---|---|---|
| Alert | India | The ship was wrecked on the coast of Formosa. She was on a voyage from Shanghai, China to Hong Kong. |
| Cambria | United Kingdom | The steamship collided with the steamship Skane (Sweden) and sank off the coast of Denmark. All on board were rescued. |
| Louise | France | The brig was driven ashore on Hiiumaa, Russia. Her crew survived. She was on a voyage from "Wyborg" to Rouen, Seine-Inférieure. |
| Ocean Wave | United States | The barque was wrecked on one of the Pinnacle Rocks in the western Sea of Okhotsk during a gale. All hands were lost. |

== 12 October ==
List of shipwrecks: 12 October 1858
| Ship | State | Description |
|---|---|---|
| Neptune | United Kingdom | The brig ran aground on the Gunfleet Sand, in the North Sea off the coast of Essex. Her crew were rescued. She was refloated on 14 October and taken in to Harwich, Essex in a leaky condition. |
| Phoenix | United States | The barque was wrecked on Medvezhiy Island in the western Sea of Okhotsk during a gale. The crew were rescued by the ship Java (United States) and other vessels the following year. |
| Red Rover | United Kingdom | The schooner was wrecked on the East Hoyle, in Liverpool Bay with the loss of two lives. Survivors were rescued by the Hoylake Lifeboat. |
| Restless | United Kingdom | The ship was damaged by fire at Peterhead, Aberdeenshire. |
| Ville de Metz | France | The ship was driven ashore on Lantao Island, Hong Kong. She was refloated. |

== 13 October ==
List of shipwrecks: 13 October 1858
| Ship | State | Description |
|---|---|---|
| Ajax | United Kingdom | The schooner was wrecked on the Kenfig Sands, Glamorgan. Her six crew were rescued. |
| Alma | United Kingdom | The ship caught fire at Malta and was scuttled. She was refloated. |
| Cambria | Denmark | The steamship was in collision with the steamship Skane (Sweden) and sank off Helsingør. All on board were rescued. |
| Courier | United Kingdom | The ship was wrecked on the Newcombe Sand, in the North Sea off the coast of Suffolk. Her crew were rescued by a yawl. She was on a voyage from Hull, Yorkshire to Naples, Kingdom of the Two Sicilies. |
| George Green | United States | The ship ran aground on the Sommers, in the Baltic Sea. She was on a voyage from Kronstadt, Russia to New York. She was refloated and towed back to Kronstadt in a leaky condition. |
| Hendrika | Netherlands | The koff was driven ashore on the Maasdroogen. Her crew were rescued. |
| Rifleman | United Kingdom | The ship ran aground in the English Channel off Tancarville, Seine-Inférieure, France. She was being towed from Rouen to Havre de Grâce, Seine-Inférieure, France. |

== 14 October ==
List of shipwrecks: 14 October 1858
| Ship | State | Description |
|---|---|---|
| Admiral Miaoulis | United Kingdom | The steamship ran aground and sank 8 nautical miles (15 km) off Saaremaa, Russia. Her crew survived. She was on her maiden voyage, from Cardiff, Glamorgan to Havre de Grâce, Seine-Inférieure, France and Kronstadt, Russia. |
| Commerce | United Kingdom | The full-rigged ship was driven ashore at Bolderāja, Russia. |
| Goddess | United Kingdom | The ship was lost off the coast of Essex. Her crew survived. |
| Jeune Leonie | France | The brig ran aground on the Elche Banks, off the south west coast of Spain. She was on a voyage from Sunderland, County Durham, United Kingdom to Alicante, Spain. |
| Margaretha Hendrika | Netherlands | The galiot was driven ashore at Brielle, South Holland. She was on a voyage from Newcastle upon Tyne, Northumberland, United Kingdom to Delfzijl, Groningen. She was refloated and taken in to Brielle. |
| Philosopher Ross | United Kingdom | The ship ran aground in the Hooghly River. She was on a voyage from Calcutta, India to London. She was refloated and resumed her voyage. |
| Sarah | United Kingdom | The barque was wrecked on the north coast of Anticosti Island, Nova Scotia, British North America. She was on a voyage from Matane, Province of Canada, British North America to London. |

== 15 October ==
List of shipwrecks: 15 October 1858
| Ship | State | Description |
|---|---|---|
| Ebenezer | (United Kingdom of Great Britain and Ireland) Jersey | The ship was driven ashore in the Magdalen Islands, Nova Scotia, British North America. She was consequently condemned. |
| Salsette | United Kingdom | The ship was sighted off Sandy Hook, New Jersey, United States whilst on a voyage from New York to Liverpool, Lancashire. No further trace, presumed foundered with the loss of all hands. |

== 16 October ==
List of shipwrecks: 16 October 1858
| Ship | State | Description |
|---|---|---|
| Sarah Heseltine | United Kingdom | The ship was wrecked on Anticosti Island, Nova Scotia, British North America. She was on a voyage from "Maturo" to London. |

== 17 October ==
List of shipwrecks: 17 October 1858
| Ship | State | Description |
|---|---|---|
| Home | United States | Sonar image of the wreck of Home, June 12, 2022. During a voyage from Manitowoc, Wisconsin, to Chicago, Illinois, with a cargo of merchandise, wood, and cedar posts, the 84-foot-8-inch (25.8 m) two-masted schooner sank in Lake Michigan southeast of Manitowoc after a collision in dense fog and early-morning darkness with the schooner William Fiske (United States) which stove in Home′s hull and toppled her masts. The undamaged William Fiske rescued her crew. Her wreck was discovered in April 1981 in 170 feet (52 m) of water at 43°56.932′N 087°33.211′W. It was included in the Wisconsin Shipwreck Coast National Marine Sanctuary in 2021. |
| Improvement | United Kingdom | The schooner was driven ashore and wrecked at Gorleston, Suffolk. She was on a voyage from Sunderland, County Durham to London. |
| Otto | Kingdom of Hanover | The koff was driven ashore and wrecked on Anholt, Denmark. She was on a voyage from Stolpemünde to Grimsby, Lincolnshire, United Kingdom. |
| Empress of Brazil | France | The ship ran aground on the Rocas Atoll, Brazil. She floated off and sank with the loss of eight of her crew. Survivors were rescued by Planter (United States). Empress of Brazil was on a voyage from Rio de Janeiro, Brazil to Havre de Grâce, Seine-Inférieure. |

== 18 October ==
List of shipwrecks: 18 October 1858
| Ship | State | Description |
|---|---|---|
| Jessie and Margaret | United Kingdom | The ship was driven ashore at Greenore Point, County Wexford. She was refloated. |
| Rajah | United States | The New Bedford bark was wrecked on the north side of Bolshoy Shantar Island, Sea of Okhotsk during a gale. Thirteen men, including the captain, perished while thirteen were saved by the ship Condor (United States). |

== 19 October ==
List of shipwrecks: 19 October 1858
| Ship | State | Description |
|---|---|---|
| Anna Maria | Kingdom of Hanover | The sloop was driven ashore at Skipsea, Yorkshire, United Kingdom. She was on a voyage from Kampen to Newcastle upon Tyne, Northumberland, United Kingdom. She was refloated on 5 November, but drove ashore again and was wrecked with the loss of a crew member. |
| Ariel | United Kingdom | The ship was in collision with another vessel and was abandoned. She was on a voyage from Liverpool, Lancashire to Antwerp, Belgium. She was towed in to Falmouth, Cornwall on 29 October. |
| Atkin | United Kingdom | The brig was driven ashore at Aldbrough, Yorkshire. She was on a voyage from Sheerness, Kent to South Shields, County Durham. She was refloated on 24 October and taken in to Bridlington, Yorkshire. g |
| Baltic | Prussia | The barque ran aground on the Lemon and Ore Sand, in the North Sea. Her crew were rescued by the schooner Triumph (United Kingdom). Baltic was on a voyage from Memel to London, United Kingdom. She was subsequently assisted off in a waterlogged condition. |
| Glen Phœbe | (United Kingdom of Great Britain and Ireland) Isle of Man | The smack struck the Cross Rock, in the Irish Sea off Skerries, County Dublin and sank. Her four crew were rescued. She was on a voyage from Whitehaven, Cumberland to Peel. |
| Hannah | United Kingdom | The schooner was driven ashore west of Blakeney, Norfolk. She was on a voyage from Colchester, Essex to South Shields, County Durham. |
| Hector | Rostock | The ship ran aground on the Swinebottoms, in the Baltic Sea. She was on a voyage from Newcastle upon Tyne to Rostock. She was refloated and resumed her voyage. |
| Jane May | United Kingdom | The schooner was driven ashore and wrecked at Dungeness, Kent. Her crew were rescued by the Dungeness Lifeboat. She was on a voyage from Antwerp, Belgium to Venice, Kingdom of Lombardy–Venetia. |
| Jeune St. Pierre | France | The chasse-marée was lost near Ouessant, Finistère. Her crew were rescued. She was on a voyage from Cardiff, Glamorgan, United Kingdom to Bordeaux, Gironde. |
| Kingston | United Kingdom | The sloop was driven ashore and wrecked at Horsey, Norfolk with the loss of all four people on board. |
| May Queen | United Kingdom | The schooner was wrecked on Terschelling, Friesland, Netherlands. Her crew were rescued. She was on a voyage from Peterhead, Aberdeenshire to Hamburg. |
| Neptune | United Kingdom | The pilot boat was driven ashore and severely damaged at The Mumbles, Glamorgan. |
| Oaks | United Kingdom | The schooner was driven ashore and sank at Blakeney, Norfolk. Her crew were rescued. She was on a voyage from Goole, Yorkshire to Wisbech, Cambridgeshire. |
| Petrel | United Kingdom | The ship capsized in the Atlantic Ocean. Her crew were rescued six days later. She was on a voyage from Quebec City, Province of Canada, British North America to Ardrossan, Ayrshire. |
| Phoebe | United Kingdom | The smack struck the North Spit, in Liverpool Bay and sank. Her crew were rescued. She was on a voyage from Liverpool, Lancashire to Cardigan. |
| Queen | United Kingdom | The sloop was driven ashore and wrecked at Great Yarmouth, Norfolk with the loss of three of the five people on board. She was on a voyage from London to Boothferry, Yorkshire. |
| Sarah | United Kingdom | The pilot vessel was driven ashore at The Mumbles and was scuttled by her crew. |
| Sir Donald Campbell | United Kingdom | The ship was driven ashore and was damaged at Greenore Point, County Wexford. She was on a voyage from Cardiff to Liverpool, Lancashire. |
| Sisters | United Kingdom | The schooner was driven ashore and wrecked at Greenore Point. She was on a voyage from Runcorn, Cheshire to Youghal, County Cork. |
| Spec | United Kingdom | The brig ran aground on the Middle Sand, in the North Sea and sank with the loss of two of her crew. She was on a voyage from West Hartlepool, County Durham to London. She was refloated and taken in to the River Thames. |
| Sylph | United Kingdom | The schooner was driven ashore in South Bay, County Wexford. Her crew survived. |
| Vigilant | United Kingdom | The schooner foundered off Pwllheli, Caernarfonshire. She was on a voyage from Liverpool, Lancashire to Pwllheli. |

== 20 October ==
List of shipwrecks: 20 October 1858
| Ship | State | Description |
|---|---|---|
| Argo | Sweden | The ship was wrecked at Sandhammaren. She was on a voyage from Cimbritshamn to Lübeck. |
| Arion | Rostock | The schooner ran aground on the Barnard Sand, in the North Sea off the coast of Suffolk, United Kingdom. She was on a voyage from Libava, Courland Governorate to Bridport, Dorset, United Kingdom. She was refloated and taken in to Lowestoft, Suffolk in a waterlogged condition. |
| Barbara | United Kingdom | The brig foundered 30 nautical miles (56 km) south of Mizen Head, County Cork. Her ten crew were rescued by the schooner Rose (United Kingdom). She was on a voyage from Brăila, Ottoman Empire to Cork. |
| Carl | Sweden | The ship wrecked at Sandhammaren. She was on a voyage from Figeholm to Kiel, Prussia. |
| Captain | United Kingdom | The ship was damaged by fire at Purmerend, North Holland, Netherlands. |
| Elisa | United Kingdom | The ship wrecked at Sandhammaren. She was on a voyage from Riga, Russia to a Scottish port. |
| Emilie | Lübeck | The ship was wrecked at Sandhammaren. She was on a voyage from Mönsterås, Sweden to Lübeck. |
| Hannah | United Kingdom | The brigantine was driven ashore near Wells-next-the-Sea, Norfolk. She was on a voyage from London to Seaham, County Durham. She was refloated on 23 October and towed in to Blakeney, Norfolk. |
| Jane | United Kingdom | The brig was abandoned 60 nautical miles (110 km) west south west of The Smalls. Her crew were rescued by Providence (United Kingdom). Jane was on a voyage from Caernarfon to London. |
| Marie and Elizabeth | United Kingdom | The schooner was abandoned in the Atlantic Ocean. Her crew were rescued by Heinrich (Flag unknown). Marie and Elizabeth was on a voyage from the Clyde to Cherbourg, Manche, France. She was towed in to Crookhaven, County Cork on 4 November. |

== 21 October ==
List of shipwrecks: 21 October 1858
| Ship | State | Description |
|---|---|---|
| Aleppo | (United Kingdom of Great Britain and Ireland) British North America | The ship was driven ashore and wrecked on Grand Turk, Turks Islands. |
| Ann | United Kingdom | The schooner foundered in the Atlantic Ocean. Her crew were rescued by Emigrant (United Kingdom). Ann was on a voyage from Swansea, Glamorgan to Brest, Finistère, France. |
| Arethusa | United Kingdom | The ship was driven ashore and wrecked in the Maas. Her crew were rescued. She was on a voyage from Sunderland, County Durham to Amsterdam, North Holland, Netherlands. |
| Edward | Hamburg | The brig was driven ashore and wrecked at Grande Saline, Haiti. |
| Herbert Huntington | (United Kingdom of Great Britain and Ireland) British North America | The ship was driven ashore and wrecked on Grand Turk. |
| Longport | United Kingdom | The smack foundered in the Atlantic Ocean 60 nautical miles (110 km) south west of the Isles of Scilly. Her crew were rescued by Narbottle (United Kingdom). Longport was on a voyage from Gloucester to Teignmouth, Devon. |
| Mungo Park | United States | The ship was driven ashore and wrecked on Grand Turk. |
| Pactoles | United Kingdom | The ship departed from Demerara, British Guiana for London. No further trace, presumed foundered with the loss of all hands. |
| Paul Emile | France | The barque was driven ashore and wrecked at Grande Saline. She was on a voyage from Port-au-Prince, Haiti to Havre de Grâce, Seine-Inférieure. |
| Peerless | United Kingdom | The full-rigged ship ran aground on Flint Island, Nova Scotia, British North America and was damaged with the loss of four lives. She was on a voyage from Quebec City, Province of Canada, British North America to Greenock, Renfrewshire. She was refloated and taken in to Mise Bay. |
| River Belle | (United Kingdom of Great Britain and Ireland) British North America | The ship was driven ashore and wrecked on Grand Turk. |
| Theresa | (United Kingdom of Great Britain and Ireland) Turks Islands | The ship was driven ashore and wrecked on Grand Turk. |
| Transit | (United Kingdom of Great Britain and Ireland) British North America | The ship was driven ashore and wrecked on Grand Turk. |

== 22 October ==
List of shipwrecks: 22 October 1858
| Ship | State | Description |
|---|---|---|
| Albion | United Kingdom | The ship ran aground on the Swinebottoms, in the Baltic Sea. She was on a voyage from Wick, Caithness to Stettin. She was refloated and taken in to Helsingør, Denmark for examination and subsequently resumed her voyage. |
| Dolphin | United Kingdom | The steamship was driven ashore between Borssele and Ellewoutsdijk, Zeeland, Netherlands. Her passengers were taken off by the steamship Alster (United Kingdom). Dolphin was on a voyage from London to Antwerp, Belgium. |
| Gharra | United Kingdom | The ship caught fire at Shanghai, China and was scuttled. |
| Jane | United Kingdom | The schooner was discovered derelict in the Irish Sea by the steamship Collier (United Kingdom). She was towed in to Queenstown, County Cork. |
| Leith Packet | United Kingdom | The sloop was driven ashore on Skomer, Pembrokeshire. |
| Reaper | United Kingdom | The ship was damaged at Hartlepool, County Durham by an explosion in her cargo of coal. |
| Ville de Cadiz | France | The steamship collided with another vessel and foundered off Lagos, Portugal. All on board were rescued. She was on a voyage from Nantes, Loire-Inférieure to Lisbon, Portugal and Cádiz, Spain. |
| Vision | United Kingdom | The frigate foundered off Cape Horn, Chile. Her crew were rescued by Stenwarder (Hamburg). Vision was on a voyage from Glasgow, Renfrewshire to Arica, Chile. |
| Xarifa | United Kingdom | The ship departed from Demerara, British Guiana for London. No further trace, presumed foundered with the loss of all hands. |

== 23 October ==
List of shipwrecks: 23 October 1858
| Ship | State | Description |
|---|---|---|
| Castle | United Kingdom | The barque ran aground on a reef off Cape St. Rocque, Brazil. She was on a voyage from London to Mauritius. |
| City of Quebec | United Kingdom | The ship ran aground at Montreal, Province of Canada, British North America. She was on a voyage from Quebec City, Province of Canada to London. She was refloated and subsequently resumed her voyage. |
| Garth | United Kingdom | The ship was driven ashore at Cape St. Rocque, Brazil and was abandoned. She was on a voyage from London to Mauritius. |
| Odin | Sweden | The schooner was driven ashore and wrecked at "Fove", Gotland. She was on a voyage from Kristianstad to Lübeck. |
| Regulator | United Kingdom | The smack was abandoned in the Atlantic Ocean 140 nautical miles (260 km) west of the Isles of Scilly. Her crew were rescued. She was on a voyage from Plymouth, Devon to Newport, Monmouthshire. |
| Thomas and William | United Kingdom | The ship driven ashore 20 nautical miles (37 km) east of Falsterbo. Sweden. She was on a voyage from Kronstadt, Russia to Wisbech, Cambridgeshire. She was refloated and taken into Helsingør, Denmark in a leaky condition. |
| Weasel | United Kingdom | The tender suffered a boiler explosion and sank at Tralee, County Kerry with the loss of a crew member. |

== 24 October ==
List of shipwrecks: 24 October 1858
| Ship | State | Description |
|---|---|---|
| Active | United Kingdom | The schooner struck a rock in the Sound of Keyleshen and was damaged. She was on a voyage from Liverpool, Lancashire to Aberdeen. She was refloated and found to be severely leaky. |
| Colombia | United Kingdom | The ship was abandoned in the Grand Banks of Newfoundland. Her crew were rescued by a schooner. She was on a voyage from Quebec City, Province of Canada, British North America to Queenstown, County Cork. |
| HMS Curacoa | Royal Navy | The Tribune-class frigate ran aground on the Pelican Shoal, off Smyrna, Ottoman Empire. All on board were rescued. She was refloated on 26 October with assistance from USS Macedonian (United States Navy). |
| Reliance | United Kingdom | The ship ran aground in the Saint Lawrence River. She was on a voyage from Quebec City to Liverpool. |

== 26 October ==
List of shipwrecks: 26 October 1858
| Ship | State | Description |
|---|---|---|
| Anna | Spain | The brig was abandoned in the Atlantic Ocean. Her crew were rescued. She was on a voyage from Saint John's, Newfoundland, British North America to Málaga. |
| Preston | United Kingdom | The steamship ran aground at the Cloch Lighthouse, Renfrewshire and was damaged. She was on a voyage from Nantes, Loire-Inférieure, France to Greenock, Renfrewshire. |

== 27 October ==
List of shipwrecks: 27 October 1858
| Ship | State | Description |
|---|---|---|
| Anna Digna | Sweden | The ship ran aground on the Goodwin Sands, Kent, United Kingdom. She was on a voyage from Gothenburg to Melbourne, Victoria. She was refloated and resumed her voyage, but consequently put in to Plymouth, Devon, United Kingdom in a leaky condition. |
| Falcon | United Kingdom | The brig foundered in the North Sea. Her crew were rescued by Seraphine (Flag unknown). She was on a voyage from Sunderland, County Durham to Amsterdam, North Holland, Netherlands. |
| Folo de Porto | Portugal | The schooner was abandoned in the Atlantic Ocean. Her crew were rescued by James L Bogart (United States). Folo de Porto was on a voyage from St. Ubes to New York, United States. |
| Horizon | United Kingdom | The ship was wrecked at "Harbovese", Norway. She was on a voyage from Cardiff, Glamorgan to Riga, Russia. |
| Kare | Sweden | The ship was wrecked at Grand Port, Mauritius. She was on a voyage from Macao, China to New York. |
| Sir James Ross | United Kingdom | The barque ran aground on the French Reef, off the coast of Florida, United States. She was on a voyage from Havana, Cuba to Falmouth, Cornwall. She was refloated on 29 October and taken in to Key West, Florida in a severely leaky condition. |
| Sir William Wallace | United Kingdom | The schooner was driven ashore on the "Lucca di Cortellazzo" with the loss of all hands. She was on a voyage from Antwerp, Belgium to Venice, Kingdom of Lombardy–Venetia. |

== 28 October ==
List of shipwrecks: 28 October 1858
| Ship | State | Description |
|---|---|---|
| Bardon | Flag unknown | The ship was driven ashore at "Harbovese", Norway. She was on a voyage from Hartlepool, County Durham, United Kingdom to Copenhagen, Denmark. |
| Bernhard | Denmark | The brig foundered off Cape Horn, Chile. Her crew were rescued. She was on a voyage from Newcastle upon Tyne, Northumberland, United Kingdom to Valparaíso, Chile. |
| Clara | United Kingdom | The barque was abandoned in the Atlantic Ocean. Her crew were rescued by Essex (United States) and Mary Stewart (United Kingdom). Clara was on a voyage from South Shields, County Durham to New York, United States. |
| Kaloolah | (United Kingdom of Great Britain and Ireland) British North America | The ship was abandoned in the Atlantic Ocean. Her crew were rescued by Doctor Barth (United States). Kaloolah was on a voyage from Cuba to Saint John's, Newfoundland. |
| Louisa | Norway | The barque foundered in the Atlantic Ocean 200 nautical miles (370 km) west of Lisbon, Portugal. Her crew survived. |
| Seeblume | Prussia | The schooner foundered. Her crew were rescued by Familiens Haab (Norway). Seeblume was on a voyage from Fraserburgh, Aberdeenshire, United Kingdom to Stettin. |

== 29 October ==
List of shipwrecks: 29 October 1858
| Ship | State | Description |
|---|---|---|
| Ada Letitia | United Kingdom | The ship was in collision with a foreign brig and was abandoned in the English Channel 12 nautical miles (22 km) off the Owers Sandbank, off the coast of Sussex and foundered. Her crew were rescued by the pilot boat Cupid (United Kingdom). Ada Letitia was on a voyage from Cardiff, Glamorgan to Leith, Lothian. |
| Australia | United Kingdom | The brig was wrecked on the Banjaard Sand, in the North Sea off the Dutch coast with the loss of a crew member. |
| Bradford | United Kingdom | The brig ran aground in the Weser. She was on a voyage from Newcastle upon Tyne, Northumberland to Hamburg. She was refloated and beached at "Heppens", where she sank. Her crew were rescued the next day by a pilot boat. She was refloated on 20 November and taken in to Bremen. |
| Caledonia | United Kingdom | The brig ran aground in the Jahde, and was wrecked with the loss of six of her eight crew. She was on a voyage from Middlesbrough, Yorkshire to Hamburg. |
| Claude | United Kingdom | The barque capsized in the Atlantic Ocean and was abandoned with the loss of eight of the fourteen people on board. Survivors were rescued by the schooner Isaac Bell (United States). |
| Dalston | United Kingdom | The brig foundered in the North Sea 12 nautical miles (22 km) east north east of Lowestoft, Suffolk. Her eleven crew survived. She was on a voyage from South Shields, County Durham to London. |
| Duchess of Northumberland | United Kingdom | The ship was abandoned in the Atlantic Ocean. Her nine crew were rescued by Marion (United Kingdom). Duchess of Northumberland was on a voyage from Quebec City, Province of Canada, British North America to Portsmouth, Hampshire. |
| Eaglet | United Kingdom | The brig ran aground on the Fahludd Reef, in the Baltic Sea. Her crew were rescued. She was on a voyage from "Wyburg" to Grimsby, Lincolnshire. She was subsequently discovered in a derelict condition 110 nautical miles (200 km) north west of Memel, Prussia by Gannet (United Kingdom). Eaglet was taken in to Memel by Gannet's mate. |
| Isabella | United Kingdom | The ship was driven ashore on Saaremaa, Russia. Her crew were rescued. She was on a voyage from Vyborg, Grand Duchy of Finland to Hull, Yorkshire. |
| Lady Campbell | United Kingdom | The ship was abandoned in the Atlantic Ocean. Her crew were rescued by Onward (United Kingdom). Lady Campbell was on a voyage from Quebec City, Province of Canada, British North America to Queenstown, County Cork. |

== 30 October ==
List of shipwrecks: 30 October 1858
| Ship | State | Description |
|---|---|---|
| Ada Letitia | United Kingdom | The brig collided with the brig Jellacich Ban ( Austrian Empire) and sank in the English Channel off Beachy Head, Sussex. Her crew were rescued by Jellacich Ban. Ada Letitia was on a voyage from a Welsh port to Leith, Lothian. |
| Edouard | Rostock | The ship was driven ashore at Rostock. She was on a voyage from Newcastle upon Tyne, Northumberland, United Kingdom to Rostock. She was refloated on 31 October. |

== 31 October ==
List of shipwrecks: 31 October 1858
| Ship | State | Description |
|---|---|---|
| Australia | United Kingdom | The brig was wrecked at Riga, Russia with the loss of a crew member. |
| Barbara | United Kingdom | The full-rigged ship was abandoned in the Grand Banks of Newfoundland with the loss of a crew member. Survivors were rescued by the brig Mary Morton (United Kingdom). Barbara was on a voyage from Quebec City, Province of Canada, British North America to London. |
| Patriot | United Kingdom | The ship was driven ashore and wrecked at Bolderāja, Russia. |
| Jeannie Johnstone | United Kingdom | The barque was abandoned in the Atlantic Ocean (50°34′N 39°12′W). All twelve people on board were rescued by the brig Sophie Elizabeth (Netherlands). Jeannie Johnstone was on a voyage from Quebec City, Province of Canada, British North America to Hull, Yorkshire. |
| Suffolk | United Kingdom | The ship was abandoned in the Atlantic Ocean by all but five of her crew. Those abandoning ship were rescued by Crown ( (United Kingdom of Great Britain and Ireland) British North America). Crown was on a voyage from Miramichi, New Brunswick, British North America to the Bristol Channel. |
| Vanderbilt | United States | The steamship ran aground in the Weser. She was on a vohyage from Bremen to Southampton, Hampshire, United Kingdom and New York. She was refloated and taken in to Southampton in a severely leaky condition. She was repaired, and sailed on 4 November. |

== Unknown date ==
List of shipwrecks: Unknown date in October 1858
| Ship | State | Description |
|---|---|---|
| Ada Letitia | United Kingdom | The ship was abandoned at sea. Her crew were rescued. She was on a voyage from Cardiff, Glamorgan to Leith, Lothian. |
| Antelope | United Kingdom | The lugger was driven ashore at Wells-next-the-Sea, Norfolk. |
| Antina | Netherlands | The galiot was driven ashore near Troy, Ottoman Empire. She was on a voyage from London, United Kingdom to Galaţi, Ottoman Empire. She was refloated on 12 October and beached. Antina was consequently condemned. |
| Belgravia | United Kingdom | The ship ran aground on the Morpoor Sand. She was on a voyage from Moulmein, Burma to Calcutta, India. She was refloated four days later and resumed her voyage. |
| Ben Muick Dhu | United Kingdom | The ship was driven ashore at Pernambuco, Brazil before 15 October. She was on a voyage from London to Saint Helena. She was refloated and taken in to Pernambuco in a severely leaky condition. |
| Bien-et-Mer | France | The schooner was wrecked between Cape Negro and the Tétouan River, Beylik of Tunis. Her crew were rescued. |
| Captain Cook | United States | The schooner was wrecked at Gaspé, Province of Canada, British North America. |
| Challenge | (United Kingdom of Great Britain and Ireland) British North America | The brig was wrecked in the Atlantic Ocean between 14 and 23 October. Five people were taken off the wreck by John Duffus (United States) on 31 October. Challenge was on a voyage from Ardrossan, Ayrshire to Yarmouth, Nova Scotia. |
| Charlotte Harrison | United Kingdom | The ship was driven ashore on Red Island, Newfoundland, British North America. She was on a voyage from Swansea, Glamorgan to Quebec City, Province of Canada, British North America. She was refloated and taken in to Quebec City in at severely leaky condition. |
| Columbia | United Kingdom | The ship was driven ashore and wrecked between "Malpee" and New Surdon Head, Prince Edward Island, British North America between 1 and 3 October with the loss of all hands. |
| Cordova | United Kingdom | The ship was wrecked at "Grognodden", near Trondheim, Norway. Her crew were rescued. She was on a voyage from Arkhangelsk, Russia to Plymouth, Devon. |
| Diana | United Kingdom | The ship sank whilst bound for Falmouth, Cornwall. Her crew were rescued. |
| Elizabeth and Margaret | United Kingdom | The sloop was wrecked at Arbroath, Forfarshire. |
| Emma Mathilde | France | The full-rigged ship was wrecked south of Pernambuco. |
| Geranium | United States | The schooner lost in the Bay of St. Lawrence. Crew saved. |
| Gloria | (Ottoman Empire) Ottoman Syria | The brigantine driven ashore and wrecked between Cape Negro and the mouth of the Tétouan River. Her crew were rescued. |
| Hedvig | Sweden | The ship ran aground near "Rubbervig" before 16 October. She was on a voyage from Gävle to Sydney, New South Wales. She was refloated and towed in to Christiansand, Norway by a steamship.{ |
| Jane Thompson | United Kingdom | The brig was abandoned in the North Sea. Her crew were rescued by Concordia (United Kingdom). She was subsequently discovered by the brig Orbit (United Kingdom) and taken in to Cuxhaven. |
| HSwMS Najaden | Royal Swedish Navy | The corvette ran aground and was severely damaged on the Galloper Sand. She was on a voyage from Kristiansand, Norway to the West Indies. She was refloated and taken in to Chatham, Kent, United Kingdom for repairs. |
| Norma | United Kingdom | The ship foundered. Her crew were rescued. |
| Orient | United Kingdom | The steamship foundered in the Mediterranean Sea before 12 October. Her crew were rescued. She was on a voyage from Gibraltar to Constantinople, Ottoman Empire. |
| Ponurania | Sweden | The ship lost before 4 October. Her crew were rescued. |
| Premium | United States | The schooner lost in the Bay of St. Lawrence. Crew saved. |
| Rossendale | United Kingdom | The barque was abandoned in the Atlantic Ocean before 1 November. Her crew were rescued by Priscilla (United Kingdom). |
| Sommers | United States | The ship was abandoned in the Atlantic Ocean. Twelve crew were rescued by the schooner Crown ( (United Kingdom of Great Britain and Ireland) British North America). |
| St. Petersburgh | United States | The ship sank. All on board were rescued by the brig Antigua Packet (United Kingdom). |
| Sunbeam | United Kingdom | The steamship ran aground in the Niger River and was abandoned by the Kroomen on board. |
| Village Belle | United States | The schooner sailed from the Bay of St. Lawrence for Gloucester, Massachusetts and vanished. Lost with all 12 hands, plus the Captain's Wife and child, and a young lady passenger. |
| Wilkinson | United Kingdom | The ship was abandoned in the Atlantic Ocean between 25 and 30 October. |
| Wingrave | United Kingdom | The collier, a brig, was run down and sunk off Lowestoft, Suffolk by the steamship Kangaroo (United Kingdom) with the loss of all thirteen crew. She was on a voyage from Newcastle upon Tyne, Northumberland to London. |
| Young Dixon | United Kingdom | The ship was driven ashore at San Stefano, Ottoman Empire before 17 October. She was refloated with assistance from a steamship. |
