= Sivuch =

Sivuch is the Russian word for sea lion, and may refer to:

- Sivuch, a Russian Bora-class hovercraft later renamed Bora
- Russian gunboat Sivuch, two ships of the Imperial Russian Navy

== See also ==
- Sivuch'i Rocks, a group of islets and rocks
