= Tuguro-Chumikansky District =

Tuguro-Chumikansky District Тугуро-Чумиканский район (Russian)
- District
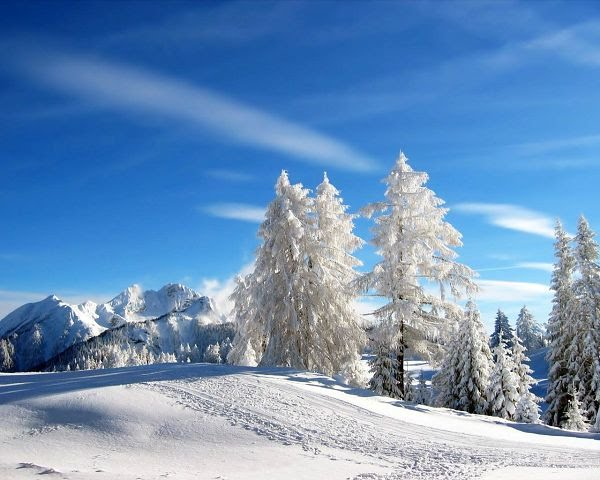
- Pribrezhny Range, Tuguro-Chumikansky District

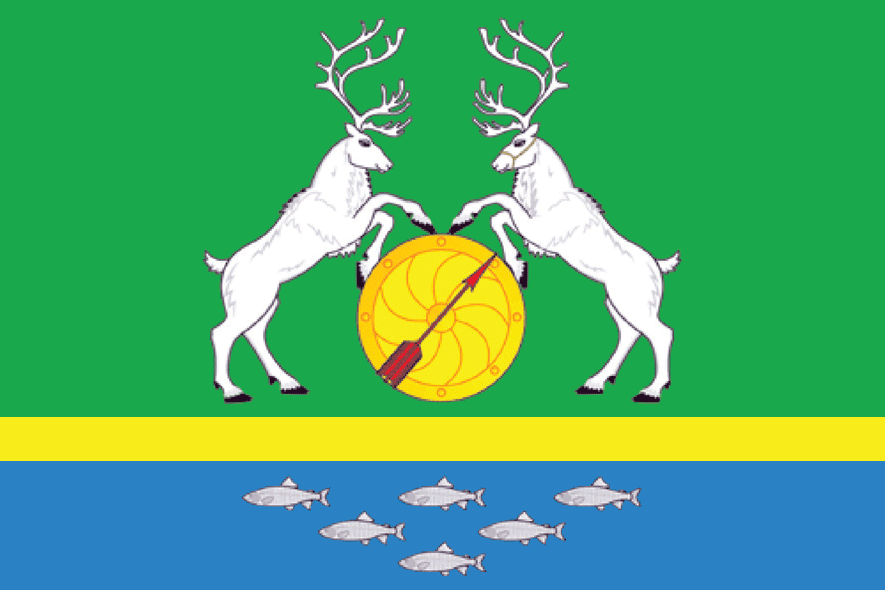
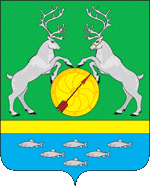
- Flag Coat of arms
- Location of Tuguro-Chumikansky District in Khabarovsk Krai
- Coordinates: 54°42′N 135°18′E
- Country: Russia
- Federal subject: Khabarovsk Krai
- Established: 1926
- Administrative center: Chumikan

Area
  - Total: 96,069 km^{2} (37,092 sq mi)

Population (2010 Census)
  - Total: 2,255
  - Density: 0.02347/km^{2} (0.06079/sq mi)
  - Urban: 0%
  - Rural: 100%

Administrative structure
  - Inhabited localities: 9 rural localities

Municipal structure
  - Municipally incorporated as: Tuguro-Chumikansky Municipal District
  - Municipal divisions: 0 urban settlements, 5 rural settlements
- Time zone: UTC+10 (MSK+7)
- OKTMO ID: 08646000
- Website: https://www.khabkrai.ru/khabarovsk-krai/OMSU/768

Tuguro-Chumikansky District (Russian: Тугу́ро-Чумика́нский райо́н) is an administrative and municipal district (raion), one of the seventeen in Khabarovsk Krai, Russia. It is located in the center of the krai. The area of the district is 96,069 square kilometers (37,092 sq mi). Its administrative center is the rural locality (a selo) of Chumikan. Population: 2,255 (2010 census); 2,860 (2002 census); 3,610 (1989 Soviet census). The population of Chumikan accounts for 47.0% of the district's total population.

== Geography ==
The district is located in the basin of the Uda and Tugur rivers. In the northeast it has a stretch of coastline of the Sea of Okhotsk indented by numerous bays. The district includes the Shantar Islands. The relief is dominated by the mountains of the Pribrezhny Range and the Taikan Range, among others. Bokon is the largest freshwater lake in the district.

== Demographics ==
Ethnic composition (2021):

- Evenks – 64%
- Russians – 31.8%
- Others – 4.2%
