= Chumikan =

Chumikan Чумикан
- Village
- 2012 aerial photograph of Chumikan

- Location within Khabarovsk Krai Location within Russia
- Coordinates: 54°42′N 135°17′E
- Country: Russia
- Region: Khabarovsk Krai
- District: Tuguro-Chumikansky District
- Time zone: UTC+10:00

Chumikan (Russian: Чумикан) is a rural locality (a selo) and the administrative center of Tuguro-Chumikansky District of Khabarovsk Krai, Russia, located at the mouth of the Uda River. Population: 1,344 (2002 census); 1,748 (1989 Soviet census).

== Geography and climate ==
Chumikan lies on the southern side of the Uda River delta, at the westernmost extremity of Uda Bay in the Sea of Okhotsk, which contains a number of small islands. The terrain surrounding the town is almost entirely mountainous except for the narrow river valley extending to the west. On the southern side rise the northern spurs of the Taikan Range, highest point 2,370 meters (7,780 ft).

The climate of Chumikan is subarctic (Köppen Dfc), with mild, wet summers and very cold dry winters which are only marginally moderated by the sea due to prevailing offshore flow from Siberia, although there is sufficient moderation that permafrost is discontinuous rather than continuous as in most of Siberia. Owing to the village's location near the sea, summers are markedly cooler and wetter than those of the inland territories, with the result that a different type of forest from the inland larch forest, dominated by Picea obovata, occurs. Chumikan is located at a similar latitude as Kaliningrad Oblast on the other side of the country, although being 11.2 °C or 20.2 °F colder over the year as a whole due to the combined influence of the Siberian High in winter and of the cold Sea of Okhotsk in summer.

Climate data for Chumikan
Month	Jan	Feb	Mar	Apr	May	Jun	Jul	Aug	Sep	Oct	Nov	Dec	Year
Record high °C (°F)	−1.3 (29.7)	0.0 (32.0)	14.7 (58.5)	21.0 (69.8)	32.0 (89.6)	37.0 (98.6)	35.1 (95.2)	32.2 (90.0)	27.4 (81.3)	19.3 (66.7)	8.0 (46.4)	0.0 (32.0)	37.0 (98.6)
Mean daily maximum °C (°F)	−19.7 (−3.5)	−13.7 (7.3)	−4.5 (23.9)	2.3 (36.1)	7.0 (44.6)	13.0 (55.4)	17.0 (62.6)	18.4 (65.1)	14.2 (57.6)	4.4 (39.9)	−9.2 (15.4)	−17.8 (0.0)	0.9 (33.6)
Daily mean °C (°F)	−22.4 (−8.3)	−18.2 (−0.8)	−10.3 (13.5)	−2.3 (27.9)	2.7 (36.9)	8.2 (46.8)	12.6 (54.7)	13.8 (56.8)	9.6 (49.3)	0.3 (32.5)	−12.2 (10.0)	−20.4 (−4.7)	−3.3 (26.1)
Mean daily minimum °C (°F)	−25.1 (−13.2)	−22.8 (−9.0)	−16.8 (1.8)	−7.6 (18.3)	−1.1 (30.0)	3.8 (38.8)	9.0 (48.2)	9.8 (49.6)	5.1 (41.2)	−3.9 (25.0)	−15.6 (3.9)	−23.3 (−9.9)	−7.5 (18.5)
Record low °C (°F)	−39 (−38)	−39 (−38)	−32.5 (−26.5)	−24.4 (−11.9)	−12 (10)	−4 (25)	−1.1 (30.0)	0.0 (32.0)	−8 (18)	−19 (−2)	−30 (−22)	−38.6 (−37.5)	−39 (−38)
Average precipitation mm (inches)	28.9 (1.14)	21.4 (0.84)	24.5 (0.96)	60.4 (2.38)	88.6 (3.49)	84.6 (3.33)	137.4 (5.41)	144.4 (5.69)	110.4 (4.35)	80.8 (3.18)	28.6 (1.13)	30.8 (1.21)	840.8 (33.11)
Average precipitation days (≥ 1.0 mm)	5.0	4.7	5.7	8.8	10.4	10.0	11.6	11.3	9.7	7.4	5.4	4.9	94.9
Source: Сводные данные (in Russian)

== History ==
It was founded in 1885 as a fishing port on the Sea of Okhotsk, and up to these days has never been made accessible by road, even though the area had been a winter port for the Yakut and Evenki people for many years before Russians discovered it. Chumikan soon became a trading center for gold, which was discovered inland within a decade after founding. In the 1920s, after the gold was depleted, Chumikan became, along with other localities along the coast, a center of resistance to the October Revolution.

In the decades that followed, Chumikan's chief role was as a center for the extremely rich fisheries of the Sea of Okhotsk, but during the latter part of the Soviet era, there were efforts to develop major phosphorite reserves known to occur inland. The dissolution of the Soviet Union meant that these efforts have largely disintegrated.
