= Maya (Uda) =

River of Khabarovsk Krai

Maya Мая
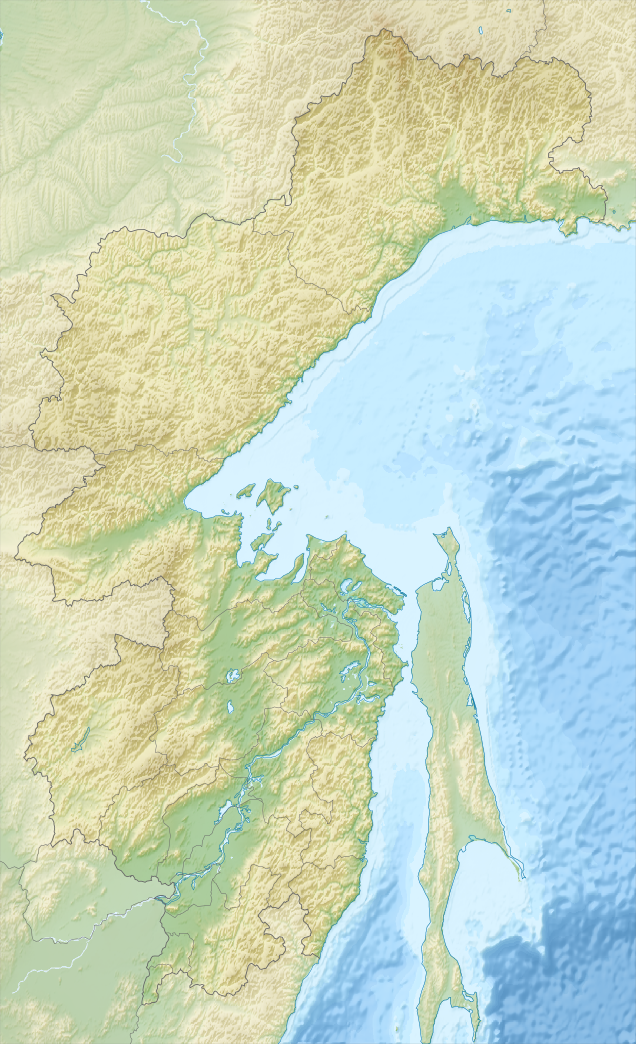
- Mouth location in Khabarovsk Krai, Russia

Location
- Country: Russia

Physical characteristics
- Source
  - location: Confluence of Ayumkan and Kun-Manyo; Toko-Stanovik, Stanovoy Range
  - coordinates: 55°28′25″N 131°52′19″E
  - elevation: 726 m (2,382 ft)
- Mouth: Uda
  - coordinates: 54°29′36″N 134°38′9″E
  - elevation: 45 m (148 ft)
- Length: 363 km (226 mi)
- Basin size: 15,300 km^{2} (5,900 sq mi)
- Discharge
  - average: 215 m^{3}/s (7,600 cu ft/s)

Basin features
- Progression: Uda → Sea of Okhotsk

The Maya (Russian: Мая) is a river in Amur Oblast and Khabarovsk Krai, Russia. It is the longest tributary of the Uda, with a length of 363 kilometres (226 mi) and a drainage basin area of 15,300 square kilometres (5,900 mi^{2}). The name originated in an Evenki word for a basket of birch bark.

The river flows across an uninhabited area. The Maya is a destination for watersports, such as rafting.

== Course ==
The Maya is a left tributary of the Uda. It has its origin in the southern slopes of the Stanovoy Range, at the confluence of rivers Ayumkan and Kun-Manyo. In its upper course the river flows fast roughly in an ESE direction across taiga-covered mountains within a clearly defined valley. After crossing a ridge, the Maya flows along the intermontane basin that limits the northeastern flank of the Maya Range (Майский хребет). Its channel divides into branches, forming islands. At the eastern end of the range the river turns southeastwards and enters a floodplain, slowing down and flowing among marshes for a relatively short distance. Finally it meets the Uda near Udskoye village, 61 kilometres (38 mi) from its mouth.

The main tributaries of the Maya are the Yalun, Ayumkan and Edegu-Chaidakh (Эдэгу-Чайдах) from the right, and the Ataga, Salga, Limnu, Cheborkan and Kononny from the left.

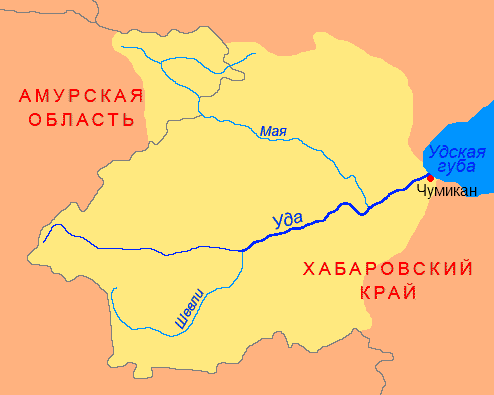
Basin of the Uda

== Fauna ==
Lenok, taimen, whitefish, burbot and grayling are among the common fish species in the waters of the Maya river.

== See also ==
- List of rivers of Russia
