= Cape Tyl'sky =

Headland in Khabarovsk Krai, Russian Federation

Cape Tyl'sky Мыс Тыльский South Head
- Cape
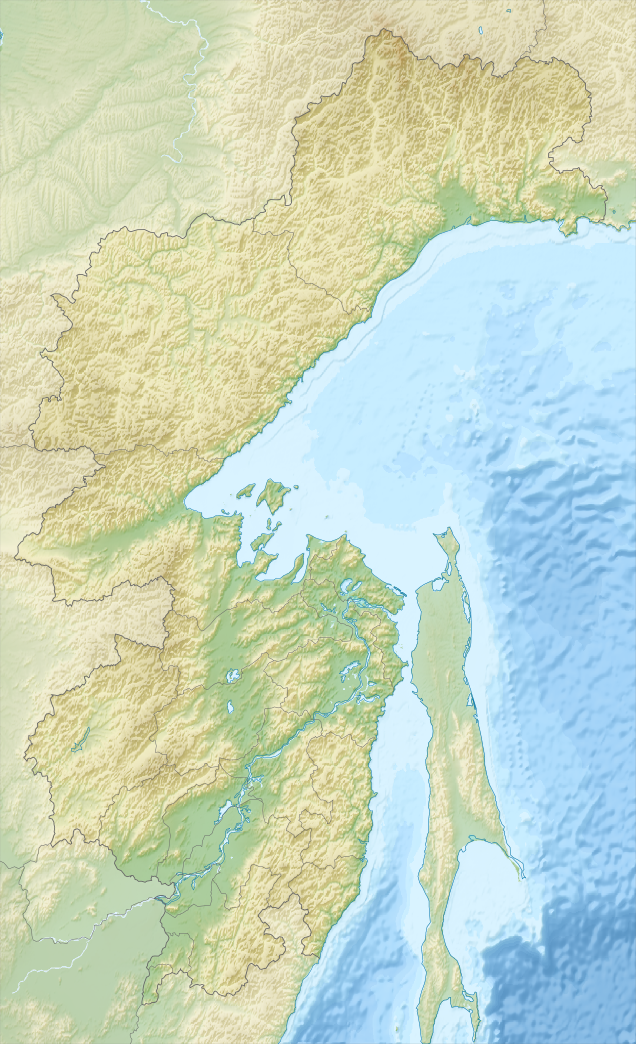
- Coordinates: 54°40′N 135°38′E
- Location: Khabarovsk Krai, Russia
- Offshore water bodies: Sea of Okhotsk

Area
  - Total: Russian Far East

Cape Tyl'sky (Russian: Мыс Тыльский, Mys Tyl'sky) is a prominent headland in Khabarovsk Krai, Russian Federation.

== Geography ==
Cape Tyl'sky is located on the south side of Uda Bay, near the mouth of the Tyl river, in the western Sea of Okhotsk. It rises to a height of 217 m (712 ft). There is a light atop a 22 m (72 ft) tower on the cape which operates from late July to late October.

== History ==
American whaleships cruised for bowhead whales off the cape from 1858 to 1874. They called it South Head. They also anchored off the cape and sent boat crews on extended cruises to Tugur Bay.
