= Taikan Range =

Mountain range in Khabarovsk, Russia

- Тайканский хребет
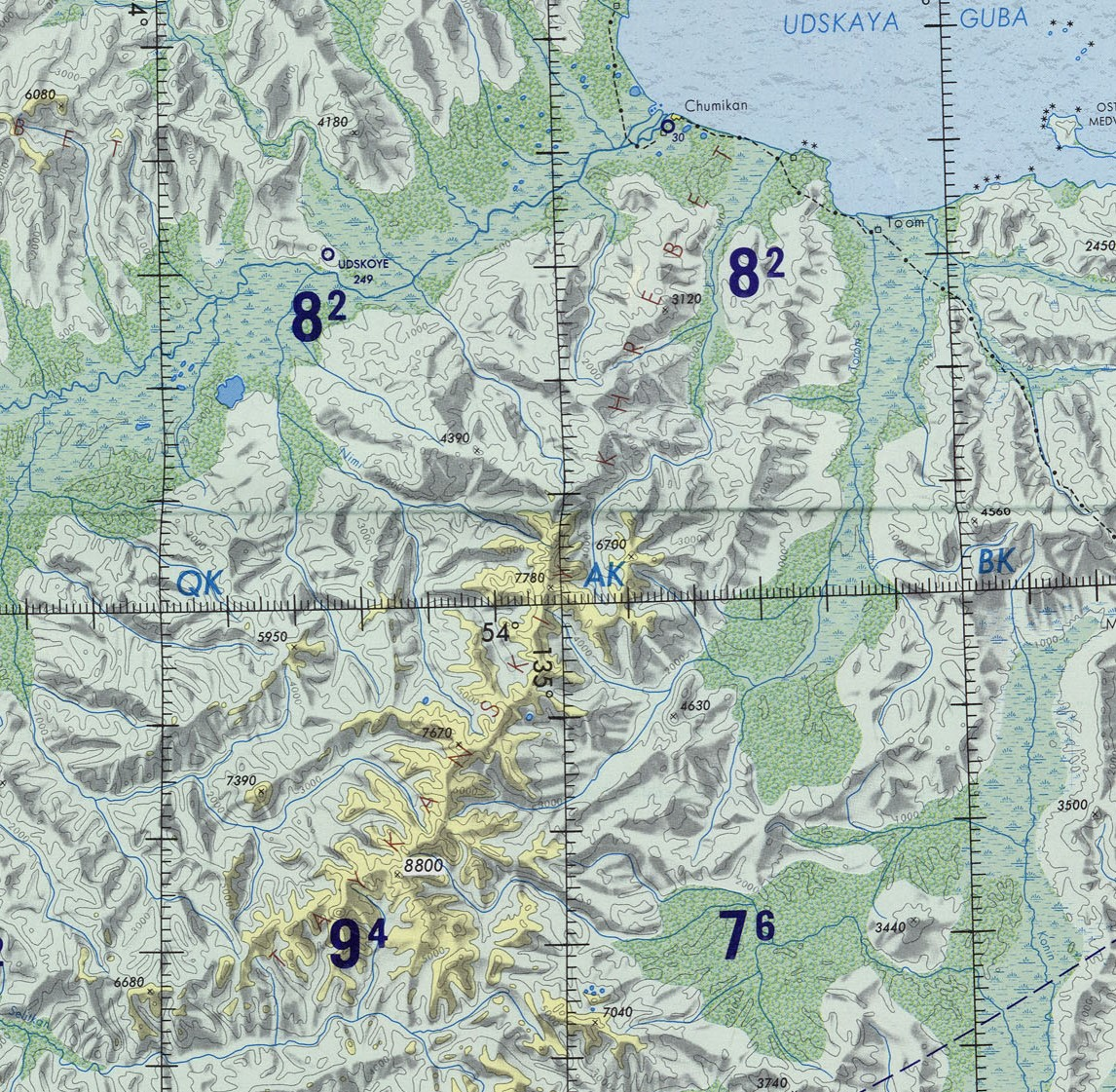
- Taikan Range map section

Highest point
- Peak: Unnamed
- Elevation: 2,370 m (7,780 ft)
- Coordinates: 53°36′25.2″N 134°34′30″E

Dimensions
- Length: 200 km (120 mi) SW/NE
- Width: 50 km (31 mi) NW/SE

Geography
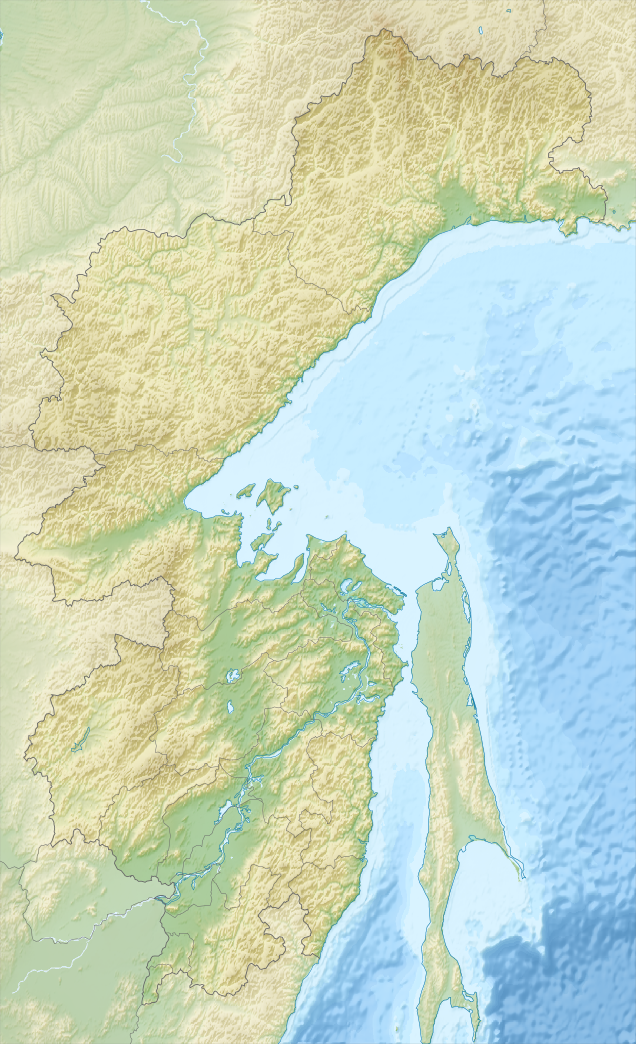
- Location within Khabarovsk Krai
- Country: Russia
- Federal subject: Khabarovsk Krai
- Range coordinates: 54°N 135°E

Climbing
- Easiest route: From Chumikan

The Taikan Range (Russian: Тайканский хребет; Chinese: 札格第嶺) is a mountain range in Khabarovsk Krai, Russian Far East. The closest inhabited place is Chumikan, Tuguro-Chumikansky District. The nearest airport is Chumikan Airport.

There are deposits of Irnimite (blue jasper) in the northwestern spurs of the Taikan Range, in the river basins of the Nimi and its tributary the Ir. The mineral Taikanite is named after this mountain range.

== History ==
The range is mentioned in "The Classic of the Eastern Mountains", an ancient Chinese text, as Mount Pei-hao, located near the North Sea (Sea of Okhotsk). The present Chinese name is Cha-ko-ti Mountain Range.

In the 17th century, at the time of the Treaty of Nerchinsk, the eastern section of the border between the Kivun and Taikan ranges was left undefined. The range was unexplored until the 1849-1852 Trans-Baikal expedition of Ludwig Schwarz.

== Geography ==
The Taikan mountains stretch in a roughly SW/NE direction for about 180 kilometres (110 mi) from the northern end of the Yam-Alin, reaching the shore of Uda Bay in the north. The range is bound to the northwest by the valley of the Uda river. The Selemdzha Range rises to the west of the SW flank. The highest point is a 2,370 metres (7,776 ft) high peak located at the southern end, often confused with the highest point of the neighboring Yam-Alin to the south. In the E-9 sheet of the Defense Mapping Agency Navigation charts the map shows the peak as an 8,800-foot-high (2,682 m) summit.

Rivers Torom and Tyl have their sources in the eastern side of the range. The Tyl Range (Тыльский хребет), a northeastern prolongation of the Taikan Range, stretches from south to north between both rivers. Lake Bokon is located below the slopes of the northwestern side of the range.

== See also ==
- List of mountains and hills of Russia
- Nerchinsk Treaty
