= Perry Winslow =

- Born: February 25, 1815
- Died: October 17, 1890 (aged 75); Nantucket
- Occupation: Whaler
- Known for: discoverer of Winslow Reef in the Phoenix Islands
- Relatives: Charles F. Winslow

Perry Winslow (1815–1890) was a whaling ship master out of Nantucket, Massachusetts. Born February 25, 1815, in Nantucket to Joseph Winslow and Betty (Comstock) Winslow, he was the brother of another whaling captain, Joseph Winslow, and the first cousin of Charles F. Winslow, 1811–1877. Among his many commands was Phoenix. While in command of Edward Cary in 1854, he was accompanied by his wife, Mary Ann (Morrow) Winslow, and his son and daughter, John and Sarah Bunker Winslow, in a whaling voyage in the Pacific Ocean.

He died in Nantucket, October 17, 1890.
