= Bokon =

Lake of Khabarovsk Krai

- Бокон
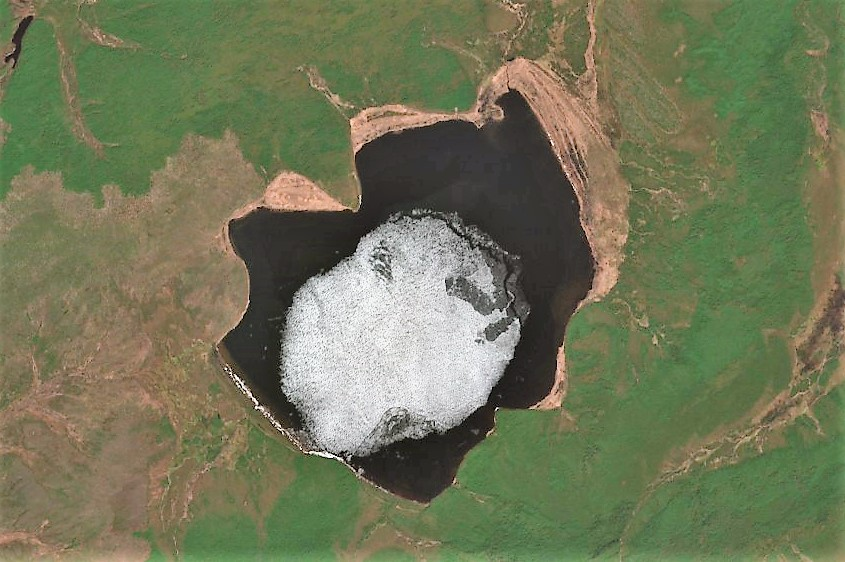
- Lake Bokon Sentinel-2 image

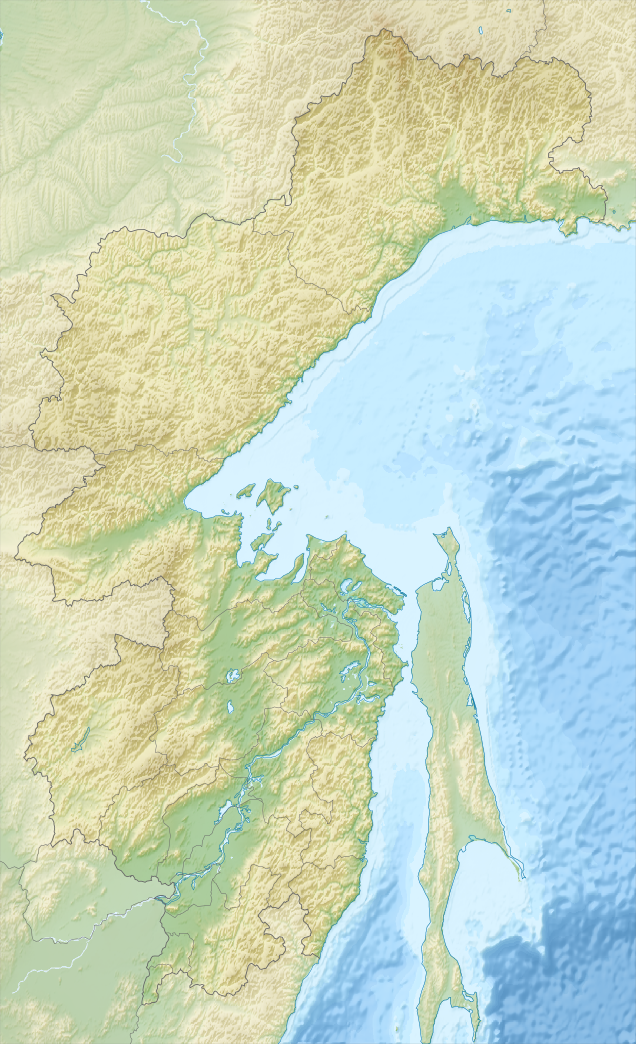
- Location in Khabarovsk Krai, Russian Far East
- Location: Khabarovsk Krai
- Coordinates: 54°19′44″N 134°10′12″E
- Type: Freshwater lake
- Primary outflows: Bokonchan
- Catchment area: 39.8 km^{2} (15.4 sq mi)
- Basin countries: Russia
- Max. length: 6 km (3.7 mi)
- Max. width: 4 km (2.5 mi)
- Surface area: 14.8 km^{2} (5.7 sq mi)
- Surface elevation: 126 m (413 ft)
- Islands: None

Lake Bokon (Russian: озеро Бокон) is a large freshwater lake in Khabarovsk Krai, Russia. It has an area of 14.8 km^{2} (5.7 sq mi) and a maximum depth of 6 m (20 ft). There are no permanent settlements on the shores of the lake.

According to local folklore, the lake is haunted by a beautiful and virtuous Evenk girl who was magically swallowed by the icy lake. She dwells in the bottom and legend tells that occasionally she may appear above the surface.

== Geography ==
The lake is part of the basin of the Uda river, Tuguro-Chumikansky District. Bokon is the largest lake in the district. It is located below the slopes of the northwestern side of the Taikan Range. River Bokonchan, a right tributary of the Uda, is the outflow of the lake.

The area is covered in snow in late October, thawing takes place in May.

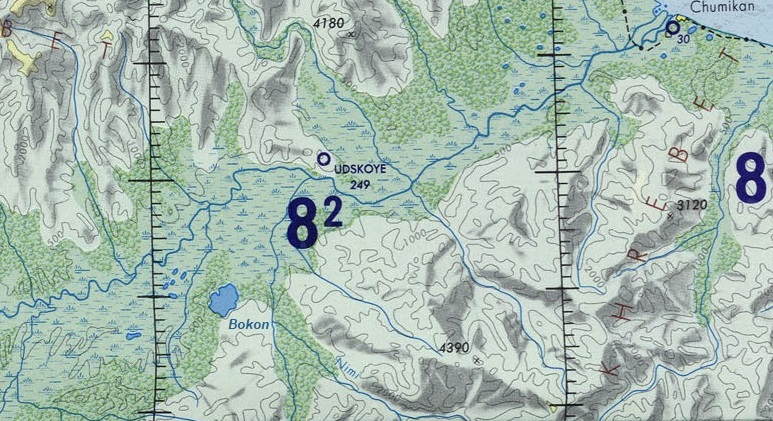
Location in the Uda basin

== Flora ==
The banks of the lake are low and swampy, overgrown with marsh vegetation, such as horsetail and sedges, as well as scattered shrubs near the shores.

== See also ==
- List of lakes of Russia
