= Severo-Vostochnaya Gavan' =

Cove in the Sea of Okhotsk

Coordinates: 55°11′N 135°49′E

Severo-Vostochnaya Gavan' (English: Northeast Harbor) is a small cove on the north side of Uda Bay, in the western Sea of Okhotsk. It lies 2.4 km (1.5 mi) west of Cape Nosorog. It offers shelter from northeast gales.

== History ==
Severo-Vostochnaya Gavan' was frequented by American whaleships cruising for bowhead whales in the 1850s and 1860s. They obtained wood and water here and also sent out whaleboats on extended trips to the head of Uda Gulf or to Tugur Bay. On 18 September 1864, the barque Mary (287 tons), of New Bedford, was wrecked in the bay during a gale. Her captain, Edwin P. Thompson, traveled to the Russian whaling station Mamga in Tugur Bay, where she was sold at auction for between $970 and $1,100 to Otto Wilhelm Lindholm. The second mate and four men guarded the wreck during the winter, and the following spring Lindholm salvaged what valuables he could before setting her afire to obtain the nails in her hull.
