= Uda Bay =

Bay in Khabarovsk Krai, Russia

- Southwest Bay
- Удская губа (Russian)
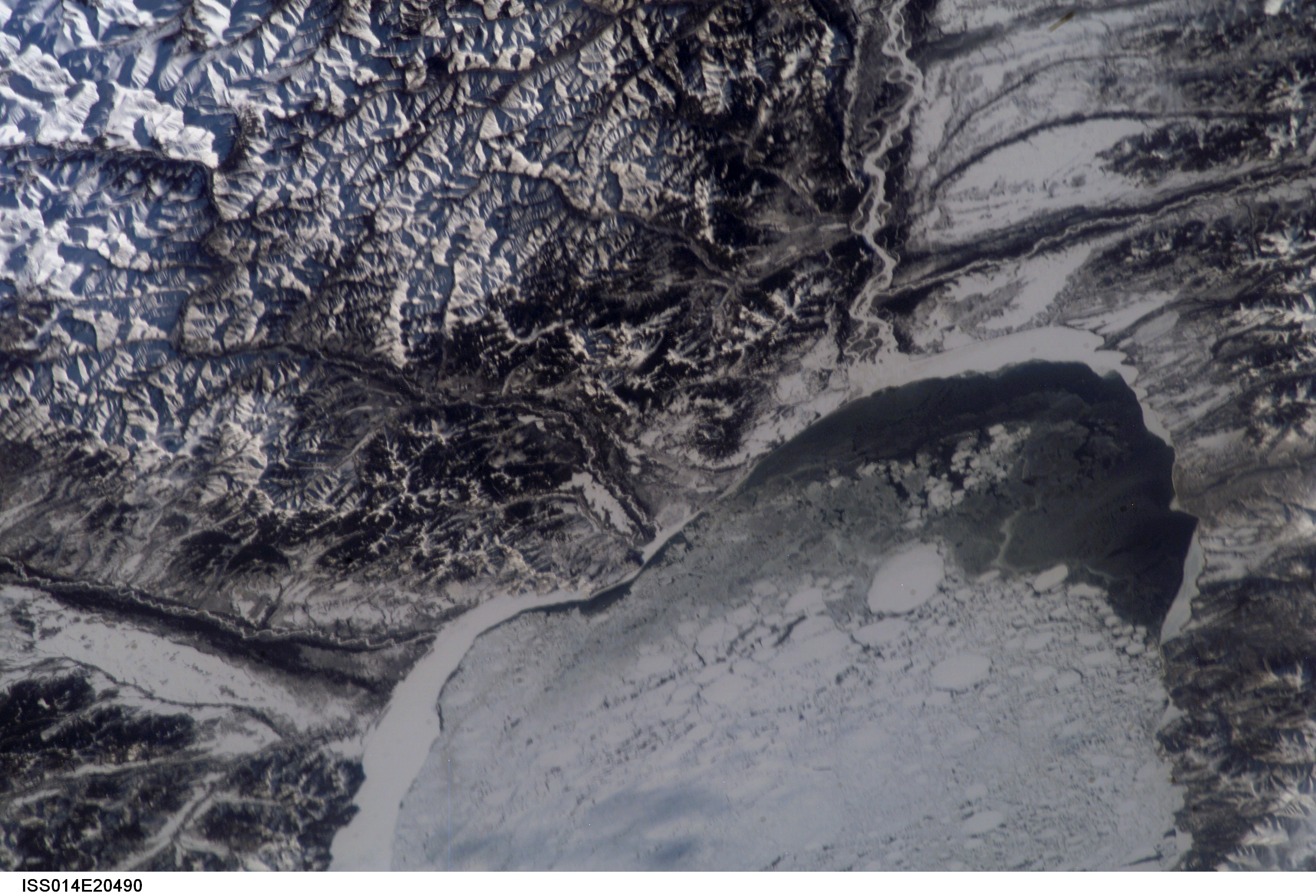
- Satellite picture

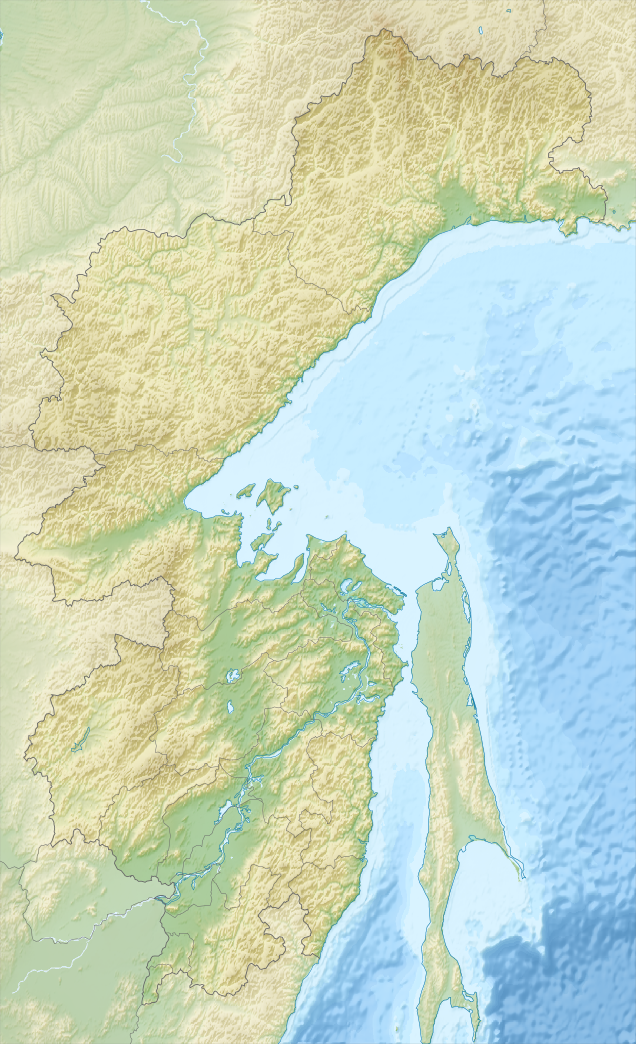
- Location in Khabarovsk Krai
- Location: Russian Far East
- Coordinates: 54°51′N 135°39′E
- River sources: Uda River
- Ocean/sea sources: Sea of Okhotsk
- Basin countries: Russia
- Max. length: 100 km (62 mi)
- Max. width: 64.4 km (40.0 mi)
- Average depth: 36 m (118 ft)

Uda Bay (Russian: Удская губа; Udskaya Guba) is a bay in Khabarovsk Krai, Russian Federation.

== Geography ==
Uda Bay is located in the northwestern Sea of Okhotsk. It lies just west of the Shantar Islands. The Uda River flows into it. It is entered between Cape Madzhalinda (55°17' N, 136°07' E) and Cape Malaya Dugandzha (54°41' N, 136°39' E). It is about 64.4 km (40.0 mi) wide. Trees line its shores, principally fir. Calms and light winds prevail from March or April to June, while southwesterly winds are common in July and August. Northwesterly gales and northeast storms are frequent in October and November. During the winter northwesterly winds are prevalent. The bay is normally enshrouded in fog during the spring and early summer. Ice typically occurs in the bay between November and mid-July. During favorable years the ice may leave by June, but after severe winters it may remain throughout the year. Tides are semidiurnal. Springs rise 6.1 to 7.3 m (20 to 24 ft), while neaps rise 4.2 m (14 ft). Tidal currents can reach four or five knots and create a large whirlpool between Cape Tyl'sky and Medvezhy Island.

The northern spurs of the Taikan Range rise inland from the southern shore of the bay.

== History ==
Between 1852 and 1905, American and Russian whaleships cruised for bowhead whales in the bay. They called it Southwest Bay. Some traded tobacco for salmon with the natives. The barque Louisa, of New Bedford, reported as many as fifty ships in sight in the bay at one time, ten of which were boiling oil.

Three ships were wrecked in the bay. The bark Ocean Wave (380 tons), of New Bedford, under Captain Hiram Baker, and the bark Phoenix (323 tons), of Nantucket, under Captain Bethuel Gifford Handy, were both wrecked during a gale on the night of 11 October 1858. The former was lost with all hands on one of the Pinnacle Rocks, while the latter was run ashore on Medvezhy Island. After spending a winter ashore, Captain Handy and his crew were rescued the following spring. On 18 September 1864, the barque Mary (287 tons), of New Bedford, was wrecked in Northeast Harbor, on the north side of the bay, during a gale. Her captain, Edwin P. Thompson, traveled to the Russian whaling station Mamga in Tugur Bay, where she was sold at auction for between $970 and $1,100 to Otto Wilhelm Lindholm. The second mate and four men guarded the wreck during the winter, and the following spring Lindholm salvaged what valuables he could before setting her afire.

Russian schooners and boat crews from Tugur and Mamga also cruised for bowheads in the bay from 1863 to 1874.

== Wildlife ==
In the spring and summer beluga whales aggregate at the head of Uda Bay to feed on spawning fish in the Uda and Torom river estuaries, while in the summer and fall bowhead whales also come here to feed.
