= Charles F. Winslow =

American physician

- Born: 30 June 1811; Nantucket, Massachusetts, U.S.
- Died: 7 July 1877 (aged 66); Salt Lake City, Utah, U.S.
- Resting place: Nantucket (heart); Cambridge, Massachusetts (ashes)
- Education: Harvard Medical School, Harvard University
- Occupations: Physician, diplomat, author, scientist
- Known for: Second person to be cremated in the U.S.
- Title: Dr.
- Spouse: Lydia Jones
- Children: 5
- Relatives: Perry Winslow

Dr. Charles Frederick Winslow (30 June 1811 – 7 July 1877) was a medical doctor, diplomat, writer, and scientist born in Nantucket, Massachusetts. He received his medical degree from Harvard Medical School in 1834. He is the author of "Force and Nature", an early work on atomic theory. He served as a physician in Lahaina, Maui, Hawaii from 1844 to 1847, and also in Nantucket, Massachusetts. He was appointed U.S. Consul at Payta, Peru, a noted whaling port, in 1862. He died July 7, 1877. After his death, he was cremated in Salt Lake City, Utah, on July 31, 1877. This was the second recorded cremation in U.S.history. His heart is buried in Nantucket, in the Newtown Burial Ground. His ashes are buried with his wife's remains in Cambridge, Massachusetts.

== Books ==
Cosmography, or the Philosophical View of the Universe (1853)

Preparation of the Earth for Intellectual Races (a transcription of a lecture to the California Assembly) (1854)

The Cooling Globe (1865)

Forces of Nature: Attraction and Repulsion (1869)
