= Taikanite =

Type of Silicate Mineral found in Russia

General
- Category: Silicate mineral
- Formula: Sr_{3}BaMn^{2+}_{2}(Si_{4}O_{12})O_{2}
- IMA symbol: Tka
- Strunz classification: 9.DH.25
- Crystal system: Monoclinic

Identification
- Color: Emerald green, blackish-green
- Fracture: Brittle - Conchoidal
- Mohs scale hardness: 6 to 7
- Luster: Vitreous
- Density: 4.72
- Other characteristics: IMA Status Approved (1984)

Taikanite is a silicate mineral. It was named after the Taikan Range, Russia, its type locality.

== Properties ==
Taikanite is a mineral with a color that ranges from emerald green to blackish-green. It crystallizes in the monoclinic system. It has a high relative density of 4.72. The mineral has a hardness of 6 to 7.

== Occurrence ==
The type locality is the Taikan Range, in the Khabarovsk Krai, Russian Far East, where the mineral was discovered in a manganese deposit. It has also been found in Hotazel, Northern Cape province, South Africa.

== See also ==
- List of minerals recognized by the International Mineralogical Association (T)
