= Sivuch'i Rocks =

Island group in Sea of Okhotsk, Russia

Sivuch'i Rocks Острова Сивучьи Камни
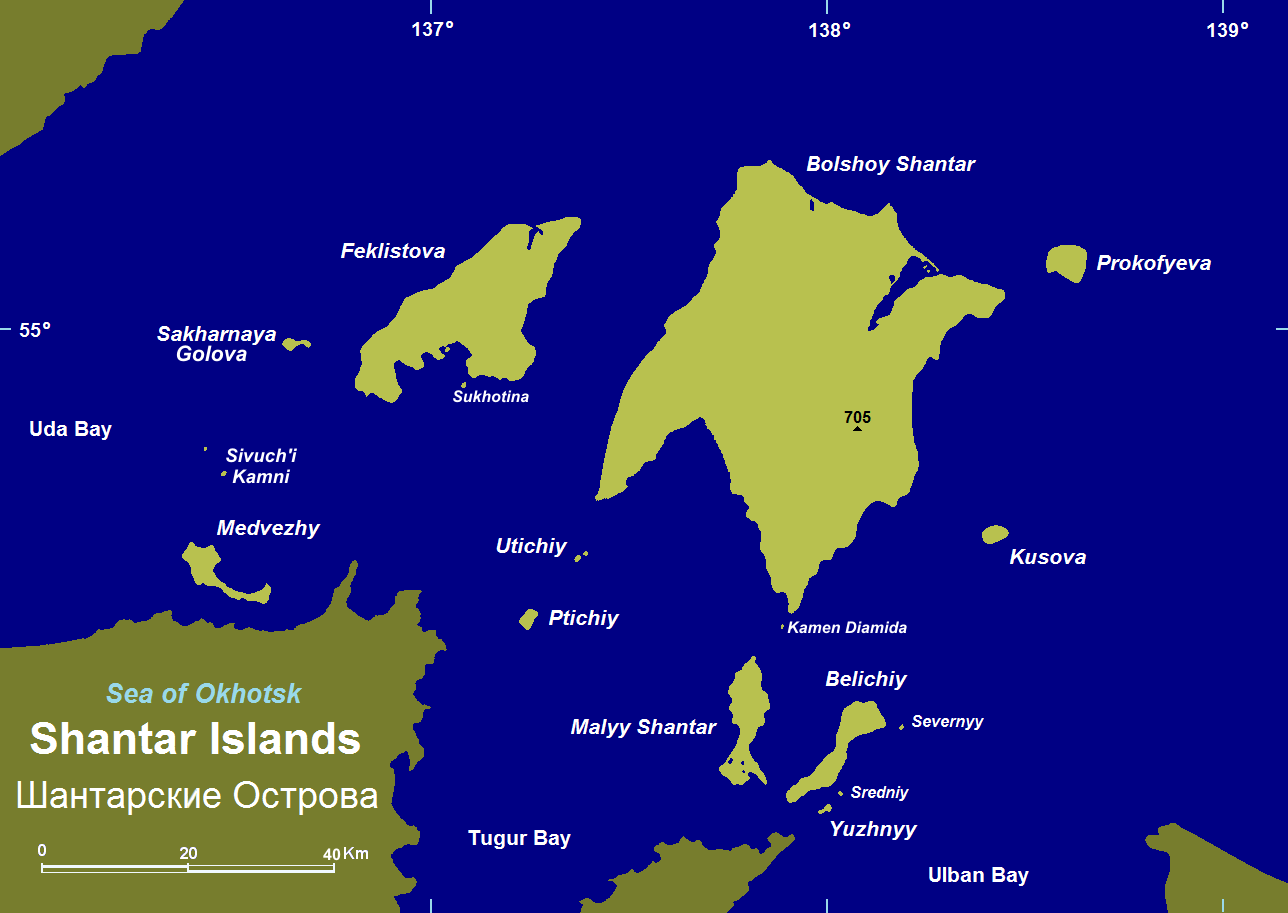
- The Shantar Islands in the Sea of Okhotsk

- Location within Khabarovsk Krai

Geography
- Location: Sea of Okhotsk
- Coordinates: 54°49′N 136°17′E
- Archipelago: Shantar Islands

Administration
- Russia
- Federal Subject: Khabarovsk Krai

Demographics
- Population: 0

The Sivuch'i Rocks (Russian: Острова Сивучьи Камни, Ostrova Sivuch'i Kamni) are a group of barren islets and rocks on the eastern side of Uda Bay, in the western Sea of Okhotsk.

== Geography ==
They lie just north of Medvezhy Island. The largest are two islets, lying 4 km (2.5 mi) northwest and southeast from each other, the former 232 m (761 ft) high and the latter 171 m (561 ft) high. A 79 m (259 ft) high pillar rock lies just to the southwest of the latter of the two islets. Reefs fringe the group.

== History ==
American whaleships and boat crews cruised for bowhead whales around the rocks between 1855 and 1874. They called them the Sugar Loaf or Pinnacle Rocks. On the night of 11 October 1858, the bark Ocean Wave (380 tons), under Captain Hiram Baker, of New Bedford, was wrecked on one of the rocks during a gale. All hands were lost.
