= Medvezhy Island =

Medvezhy Island Медвежий остров
- Island
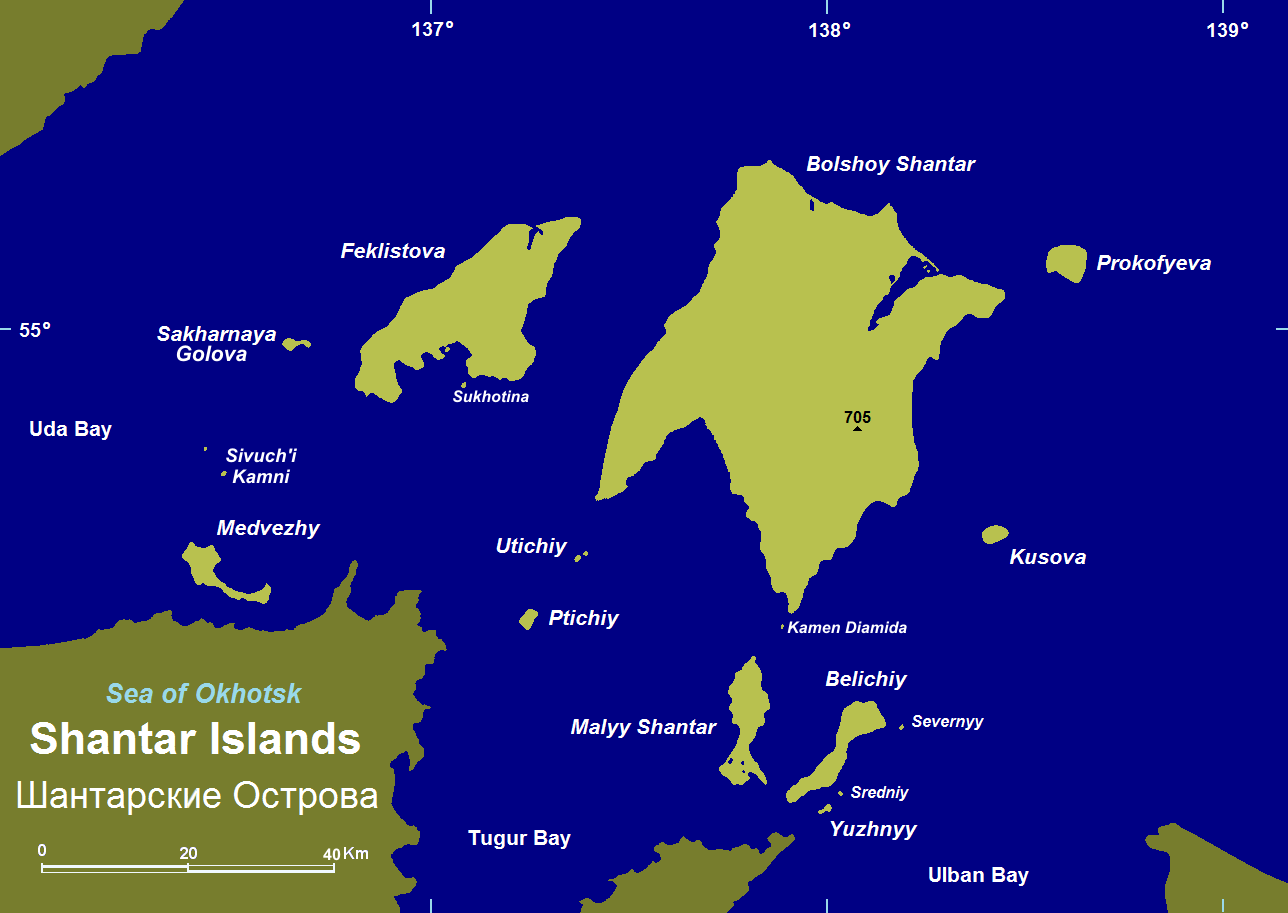
- Map of the Shantar Islands. Medvezhy is the long, narrow island in the far left corner.

- Location within Khabarovsk Krai
- Coordinates: 54°38′N 136°20′E
- Country: Russian Federation
- Federal subject: Far Eastern Federal District
- Krai: Khabarovsk Krai
- Elevation: 174 m (571 ft)

Medvezhy Island (Russian: Медвежий остров, Medvezhy Ostrov) is a long, narrow island in the northwestern Sea of Okhotsk, the westernmost of the Shantar Islands. It lies on the eastern side of Uda Bay. It is 12.9 km (8 mi) long. It is separated from the mainland by Shevchenko Strait.

== History ==
Between 1855 and 1874, American whaleships anchored under Medvezhy to obtain shelter from storms and retrieve wood. They also used it as a staging point to send out smaller whaleboats to capture bowhead whales in Uda and Tugur Bays. They called it Elbow Island. "Medvezhy" translates as "Bear" in Russian.

On the night of 11 October 1858, the bark Phoenix (323 tons), of Nantucket, under Captain Bethuel Handy, of Cotuit, was wrecked on the west side of the island during a gale. Captain Handy and about a dozen men crossed the frozen Shevchenko Strait. On 12 December 1858 and traveled along the coast to Chumikan at the mouth of the Uda River where native hunters took them inland to the Russian military settlement of Udskoye, where they spent the winter; while the first mate Charles Chester and the rest of the crew spent the winter in a hut of wood and sails they had built on Medvezhy. In June 1859, the men at Udskoye traveled to the mouth of the Uda River, where they were rescued by the ship Java; the rest of the crew on Medvezhy were saved by other ships.
