= Russian gunboat Sivuch =

Russian gunboat Sivuch may refer to:

- Russian gunboat Sivuch (1884), an Imperial Russian Navy gunboat launched in 1884 and scuttled in 1904
- Russian gunboat Sivuch (1907), an Imperial Russian Navy gunboat launched in 1907 and sunk in 1915
