= Uda (Khabarovsk Krai) =

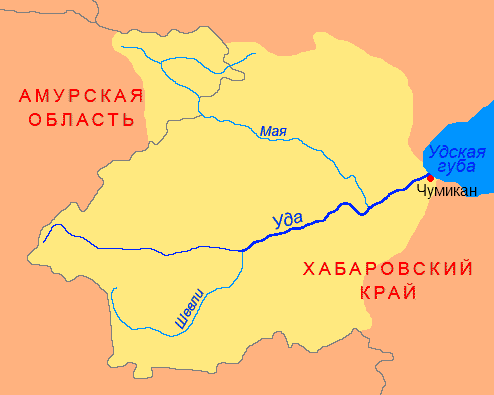
- Map of the Uda

Location
- Country: Russia

Physical characteristics
- Mouth: Sea of Okhotsk
  - location: Uda Bay
  - coordinates: 54.7406°N 135.3014°E
- Length: 457 km (284 mi)
- Basin size: 61,300 km^{2} (23,700 sq mi)

The Uda (Russian: У́да, Chinese: 乌第河) is a river in Khabarovsk Krai, in the Russian Far East. It is 457 kilometres (284 mi) long, and has a drainage basin of 61,300 square kilometres (23,700 sq mi).

== Geography ==
The Uda flows into the Sea of Okhotsk near the small town Chumikan. It rises south of the eastern Stanovoy Mountains and flows roughly eastwards. It borders the northern side of the Dzhagdy Range. In its lower course it flows close to the northwestern side of the Taikan Range into the Uda Bay of the Sea of Okhotsk near the Shantar Islands. Lake Bokon is located in the lower basin of the river.

=== Tributaries ===
Its main tributaries are the 229 kilometres (142 mi) long Shevly, the 142 kilometres (88 mi) long Gerbikan and the 134 kilometres (83 mi) long Galam from the right, and the 160 kilometres (99 mi) long Chogar, the 186 kilometres (116 mi) long Dzhana, the 363 kilometres (226 mi) long Maya and the 148 kilometres (92 mi) long Udykhyn from the left.

== History ==
From the Treaty of Nerchinsk (1689) to the Treaty of Aigun (1858) its lower course was officially part of the border between Russia and China, although the border was not clearly marked and the area rarely visited. Some of Ivan Moskvitin's men reached the Uda in 1640. The local Lamuts told them of the rivers Zeya and the Amur but would not guide them inland. In 1684 some Cossacks fled from the Manchus on the Zeya, reached Udsk, and went up the Maya to Yakutsk.

Udsk Ostrog (fort) was founded in 1679, or 1659 on the left bank of the river 76 to 97 kilometres (47 to 60 mi) upstream. There were suggestions to move Okhotsk south to Udsk but this was rejected because of the poor harbor and the proximity of the Chinese border. There were generally about 10 peasant families around the fort trying to produce grain and a few thin cattle, but results were poor. Sometimes seed corn had to be imported. A pood of rye flour that cost half a ruble at Irkutsk cost 8 to 10 rubles at Udsk. The population was 30 in 1690, 200 in 1800 and 164 in 1865.

Yakutsk-Udsk Track: This was an ill-defined route used to supply Udsk from Yakutsk. It was open from April to October but there was some winter travel. Its length was estimated at 1,123 to 1,502 kilometres (698 to 933 mi). It crossed the Amga River at Amginsk, the Aldan River at Kompaneisk and the Uchur River at Uchur Crossing. Pack horses were usually left at Udsk as food for sled dogs or people while the Yakut drivers returned to Yakutsk on foot or skis. In 1750 all the pack horses perished in deep snow resulting in starvation. In 1788 more than 100 horses drowned during the spring snowmelt.

== See also ==
- List of rivers of Russia
