= Phoenix (1821 whaler) =

History

United States
- Name: Phoenix
- Owner: T&P Macy (1844); Gardner & McCeave (1853)
- Builder: Rochester, MA
- Launched: 1821
- Fate: Wrecked 12 October 1858

General characteristics
- Tons burthen: 323 (bm)

Phoenix, or Phenix, was an American wooden whaler, launched in 1821. She plied the Pacific Ocean from her homeport of Nantucket, Massachusetts. She made ten complete voyages between 1821 and her loss, on her 11th voyage, in 1858.

Phoenix and her captain, Perry Winslow, discovered Winslow Reef, northwest of Canton, in 1851. The entire group of Phoenix Islands in the South Pacific are named after a ship, which was active in the area in the 1820s, which may be this ship.

Phoenix was in the Galapagos in 1835 and 1836. On 10 January 1836 the crew was ashore and left graffiti carved into rocks there. While in the Galapagos islands the crew also gathered tortoises to eat, perhaps as many as 140.

== Whaling voyages ==
Between 1821 and 1858, Phoenix made 11 whaling voyages:

Departure	Return	Master	Sperm oil (barrels)	Whale oil (barrels)	Notes
1821, Sep	1824, Apr	Harris, David	1935		
1824	1826				Temporarily withdrawn from whaling
1826, Dec	1829, Jun	Fitzgerald, William	2234	0	
1829, Oct	1831, Aug	Gardner, John J.	2340	0	
1831, Oct	1834, Jan	Wilber, Sanford	2205	0	
1834, Jul	1837, Feb	Hussey, Isaac B.	2345	0	
1827, Nov	1840, Feb	Hussey, Isaac B.	2419	0	
1840, Jun	1843, Feb	Hamlin, Josiah	2241	24	
1844, Sep	1848, Jun	Winslow, Perry	1648	24	
1848, Nov	1853, Feb	Winslow, Perry	1648	10	
1853, Jul	1856, May	Morey, Israel	162	1975	10,800 lb (4,900 kg) of bone
1856, Oct	1858 lost	Handy, Bethel (Bethuel) Gifford; Hinkley, J	150	1075	

== Fate ==
Phoenix was lost on Elbow Island in the Sea of Okhotsk on 12 October 1858, about 100 miles from Ayan.
