= Okhotsk region =

The Okhotsk region may refer to:

- Okhotsky District in Russia;
- Okhotsk Subprefecture in Japan.
