= Berill Mountain =

Mountain in the Suntar-Khayata Range

Berill
- Location within Far Eastern Federal District

Highest point
- Elevation: 2,933 m (9,623 ft)
- Coordinates: 62°23′45″N 141°19′36″E

Geography
- Location: Khabarovsk Krai, Russia
- Parent range: Suntar-Khayata Range

Berill (Russian: Берилл) is a peak in the Suntar-Khayata Range.

The elevation above sea level of the mountain is 2,933 m. It is the highest point of Khabarovsk Krai.

== See also ==
- List of highest points of Russian federal subjects
- List of mountains and hills of Russia
