= Urak =

River in Khabarovsk Krai, Russia

Urak Урак
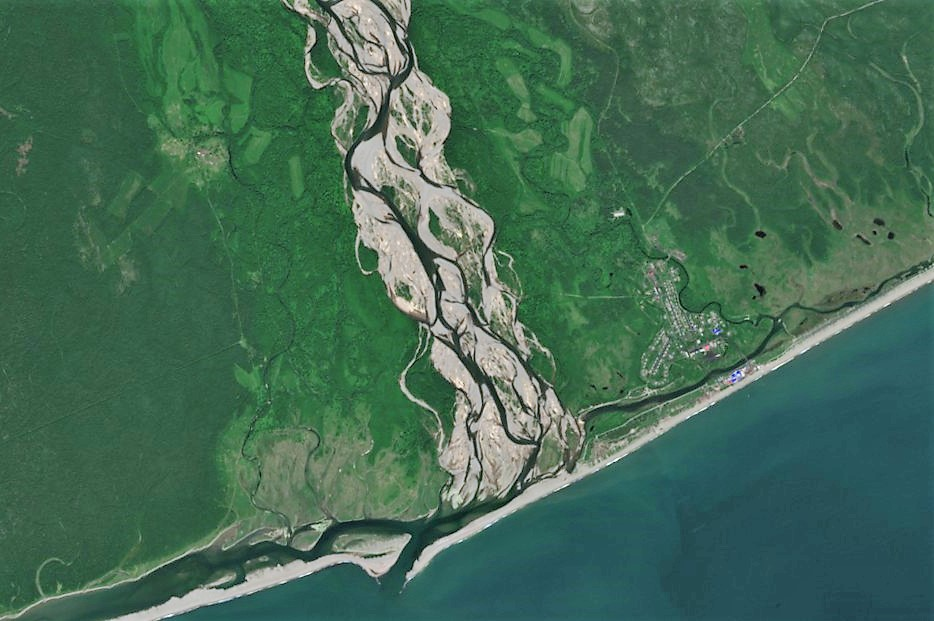
- Last stretch of the Urak Sentinel-2 image

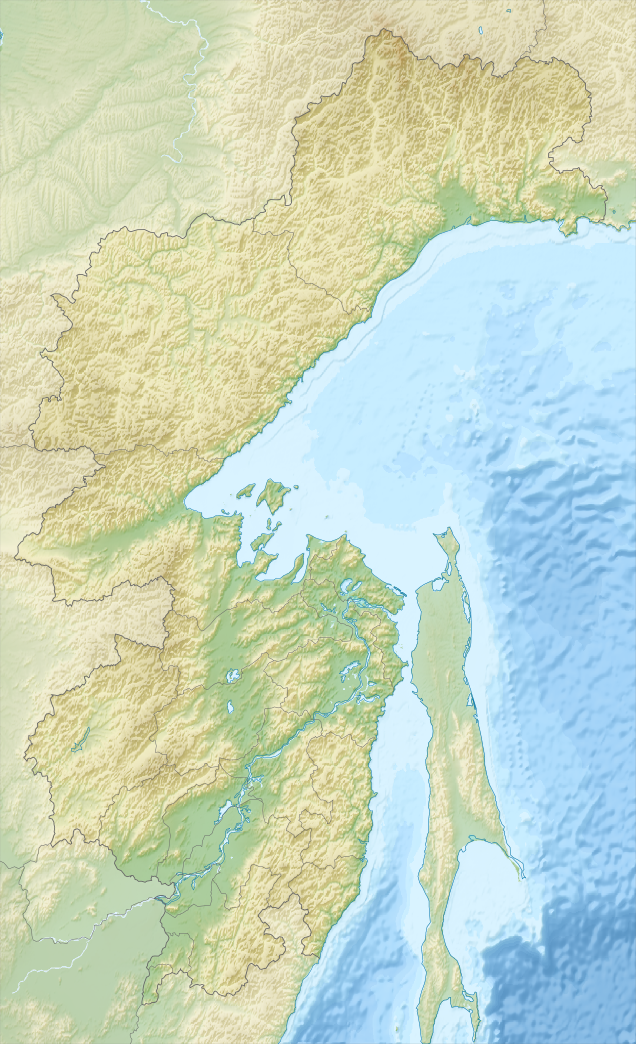
- Mouth location in Khabarovsk Krai, Russia

Location
- Country: Khabarovsk Krai, Russia

Physical characteristics
- Source
  - location: Urak Plateau
  - coordinates: 60°00′55″N 140°13′08″E
  - elevation: ca 900 m (3,000 ft)
- Mouth: Sea of Okhotsk
  - location: West of Vostretsovo
  - coordinates: 59°17′30″N 142°50′16″E
  - elevation: 0 m (0 ft)
- Length: 229 km (142 mi)
- Basin size: 10,700 km^{2} (4,100 sq mi)
- Discharge
  - average: 108 cubic metres per second (3,800 cu ft/s)

The Urak (Russian: Урак) is a river in Okhotsky District, Khabarovsk Krai, Russian Far East. It has a length of 229 km (142 mi) and a drainage basin of 10,700 square kilometres (4,100 mi^{2}).

The river flows across uninhabited territory. In former times the Yudoma Portage led southeast from the Yudoma river to the Urak and a longer horse track led to the Urak Landing.

== Course ==
The Urak river has its source at an elevation of nearly 900 m (3,000 ft) in the western slopes of the Urak Plateau. It flows roughly eastwards through the mountainous area. In its last stretch it bends southwards and flows roughly parallel to river Okhota to the east for about 50 km (31 mi). Finally it flows into the Sea of Okhotsk west of Vostretsovo village.

The main tributary of the Urak is the 246 kilometres (153 mi) long Ketanda that joins it from the left. The river is fed by snow and rain. It freezes around late October and stays frozen until mid May.

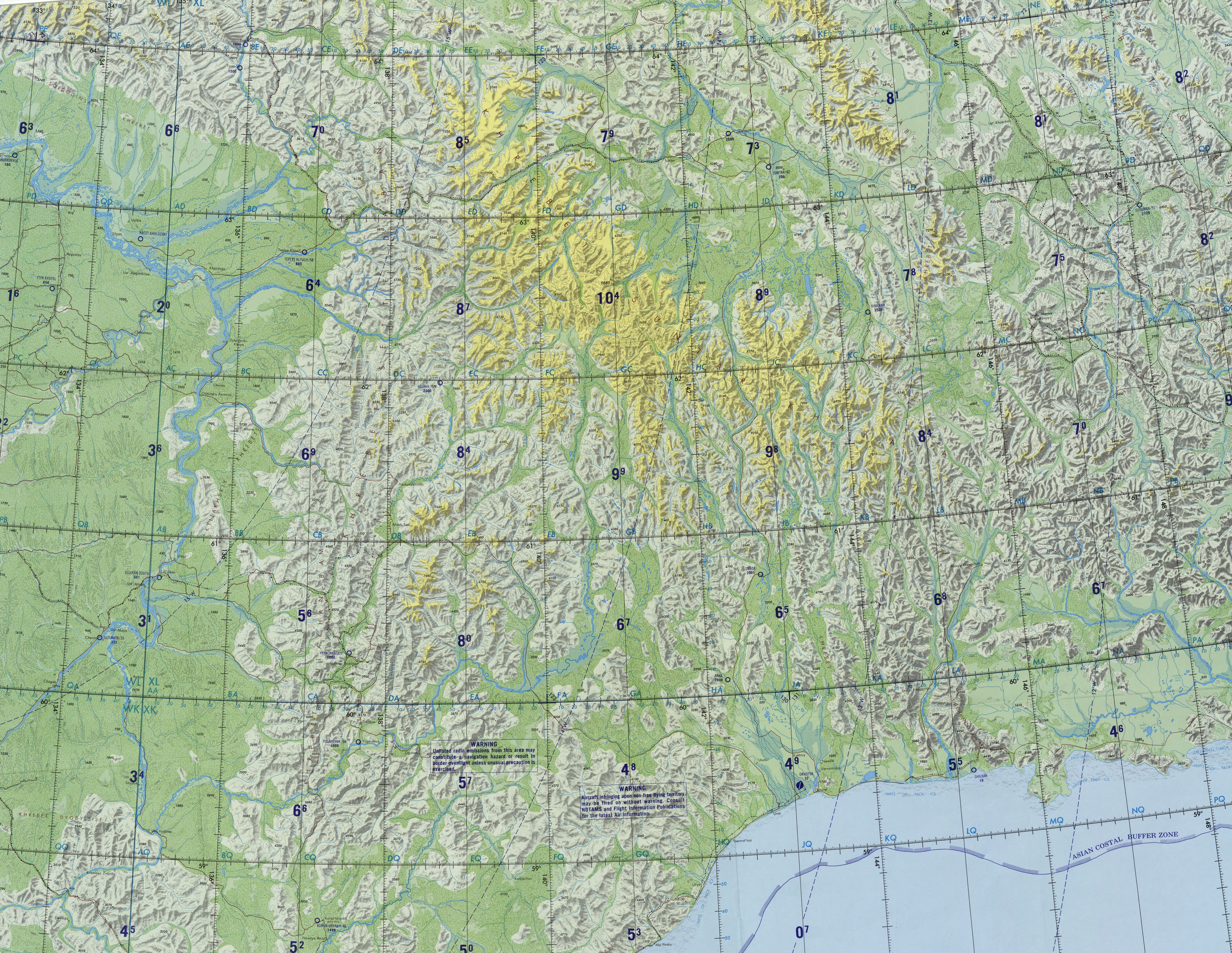
ONC map showing the northern shore of the Sea of Okhotsk.

== Fauna ==
The Urak is a spawning ground for salmon species, including coho salmon, chum salmon, pink salmon and sockeye salmon. Other fish species common in the river include Dolly Varden trout, whitespotted char and Arctic grayling.

== See also ==
- List of rivers of Russia
