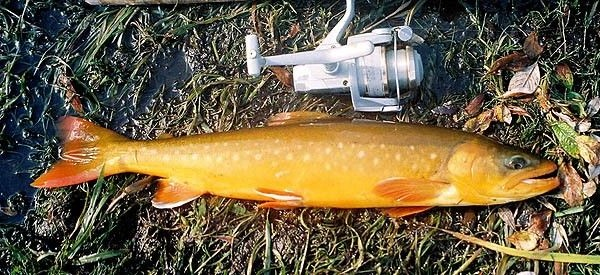
- Neiva caught by an angler

Scientific classification
- Domain: Eukaryota
- Kingdom: Animalia
- Phylum: Chordata
- Class: Actinopterygii
- Order: Salmoniformes
- Family: Salmonidae
- Genus: Salvelinus
- Species: S. neiva

Binomial name
- Salvelinus neiva Taranetz, 1933

= Salvelinus neiva =

Species of fish

Salvelinus neiva, also known as neiva, is a freshwater species of fish in the salmon family. It is endemic to the Okhota river basin of the Russian far east and mountain lakes nearby.

== Description ==
Neiva can reach a recorded maximum length of 55.0 cm (21.7 inches). The fish have a banded body and a large conical head. Usually they have silvery body, with bright yellow spots during the spawning season.
