= Inya (Sea of Okhotsk) =

Inya Иня
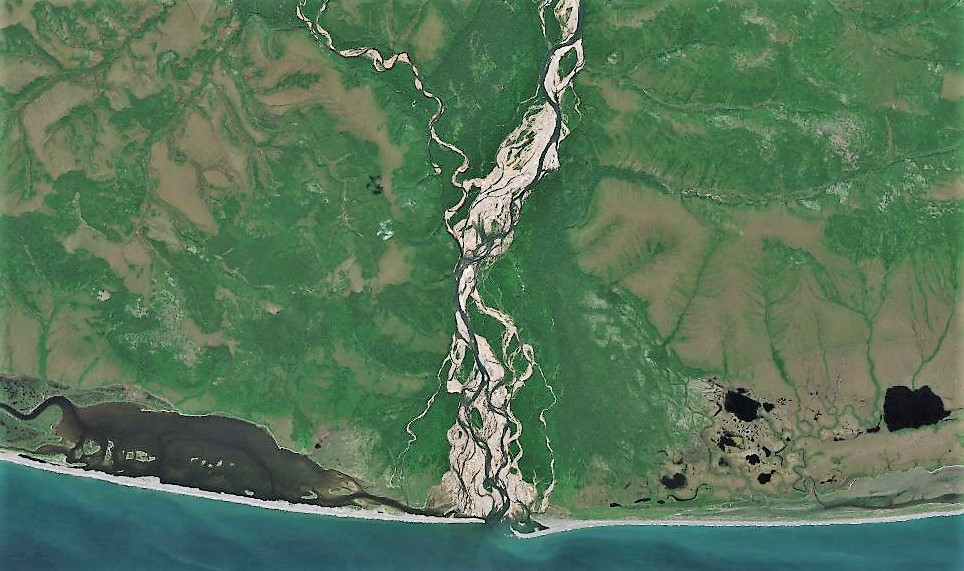
- Last stretch of the Inya Sentinel-2 image

- Mouth location in the Far Eastern Federal District, Russia

Location
- Country: Khabarovsk Krai, Russia

Physical characteristics
- Source
  - location: Khel-Degi lake
  - coordinates: 61°38′34″N 145°49′21″E
  - elevation: 953 m (3,127 ft)
- Mouth: Sea of Okhotsk
  - location: By Novaya Inya
  - coordinates: 59°22′11″N 144°54′42″E
  - elevation: 0 m (0 ft)
- Length: 330 km (210 mi)
- Basin size: 19,700 km^{2} (7,600 sq mi)
- Discharge
  - average: 236 m^{3}/s (8,300 cu ft/s)

The Inya (Russian: Иня) is a river in Okhotsky District, Khabarovsk Krai, Russian Far East. It has a drainage basin of 19,700 square kilometres (7,600 mi^{2}) and a length of 330 km (210 mi). The river is a tourist destination for rafting and kayaking.

The basin of the Inya is a spawning ground for salmon. Other fish species are also abundant in its waters, as well as crab fisheries near the mouth.

== Course ==
The Inya river has its source at an elevation of 953 m (3,127 ft) in the Khel-Degi (Хэл-Дэги) lake, part of a lake system of the eastern end of the Suntar-Khayata range.

The Inya flows roughly southwards across mountainous terrain with waterfalls and rapids in an area of mountain tundra. The Kheidzhan Range on the left side of its valley separates it from the Taui (Kava) basin in the east. In its last stretch the river expands and fans out in many arms through a widening floodplain parallel to the Ulbeya to the west. Finally it flows into the Sea of Okhotsk by the Novaya Inya settlement. There are no other inhabited places near the river.

The main tributary of the Inya is the 210 kilometres (130 mi) long Nilgysy that joins it in its middle course from the right. The river freezes before mid October and stays frozen until mid May.

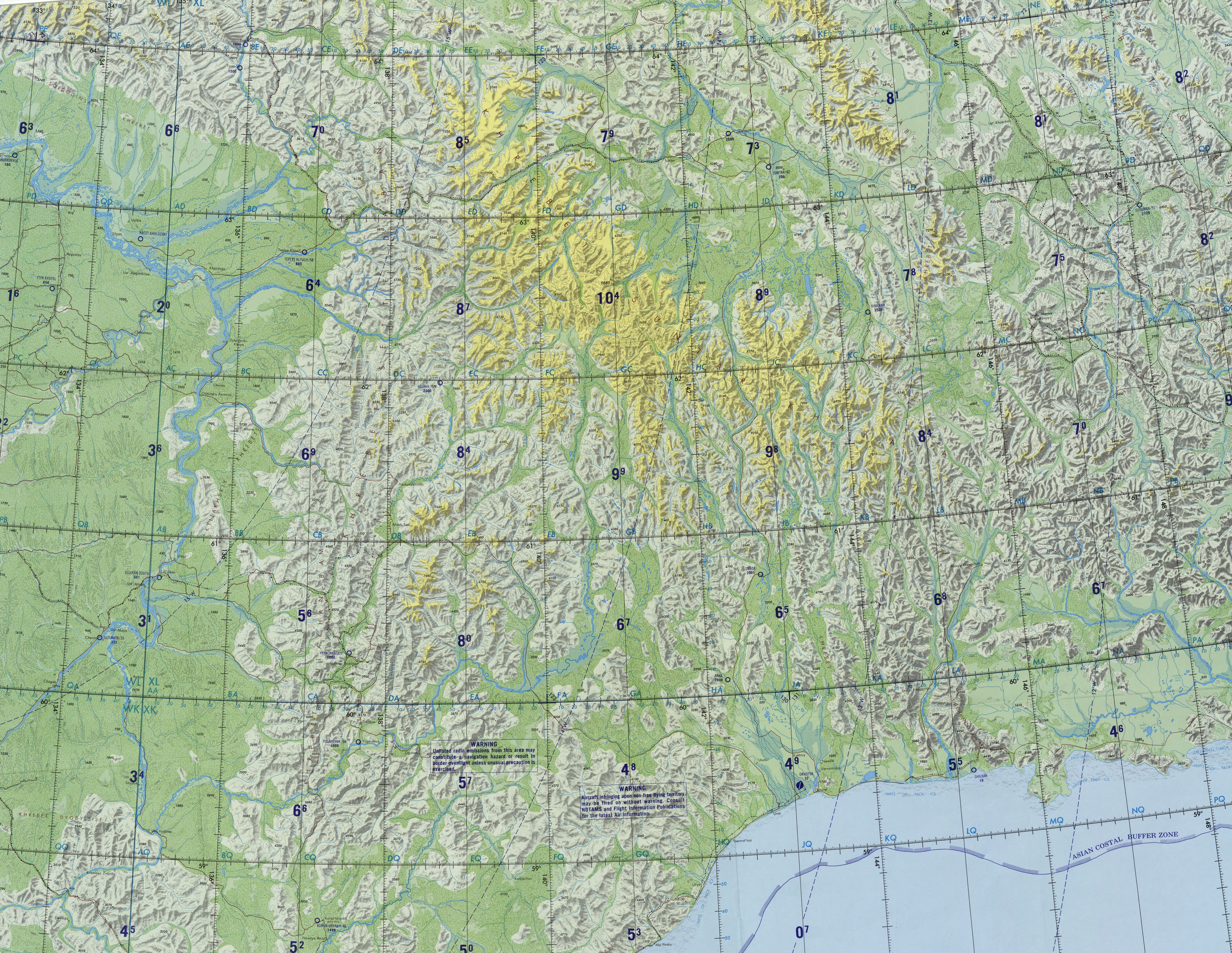
ONC map showing the northern shore of the Sea of Okhotsk.

== See also ==
- List of rivers of Russia
