= Ulbeya =

River in Khabarovsk Krai, Russia

Ulbeya Ульбея
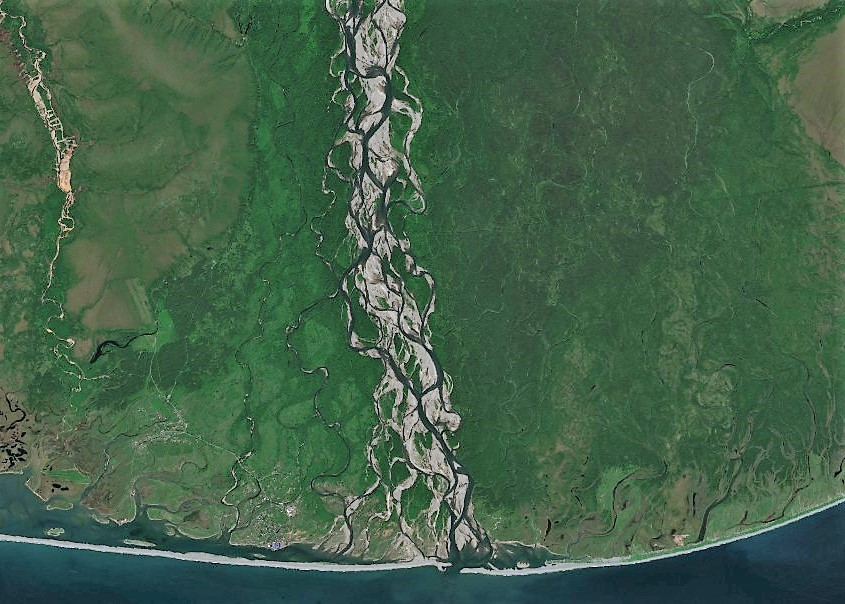
- Last stretch of the Ulbeya Sentinel-2 image

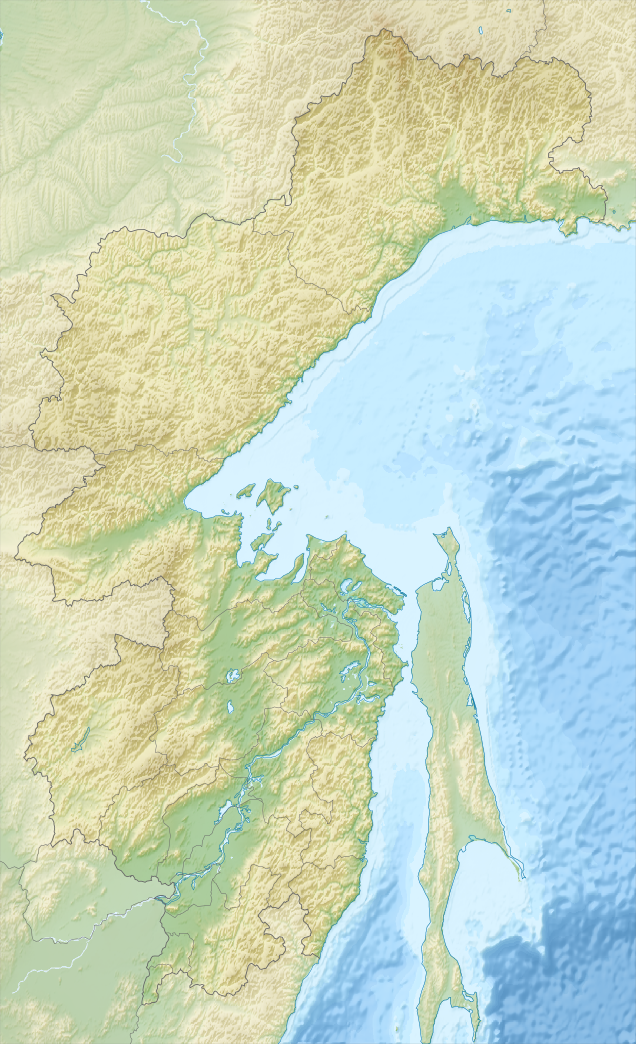
- Mouth location in Khabarovsk Krai, Russia

Location
- Country: Khabarovsk Krai, Russia

Physical characteristics
- Source
  - location: Suntar Khayata
  - coordinates: 61°57′28″N 143°00′45″E
  - elevation: ca 2,200 m (7,200 ft)
- Mouth: Sea of Okhotsk
  - coordinates: 59°22′19″N 144°24′41″E
  - elevation: 0 m (0 ft)
- Length: 399 km (248 mi) (including the Granitny)
- Basin size: 13,500 km^{2} (5,200 sq mi)

The Ulbeya (Russian: Ульбея) is a river in Okhotsky District, Khabarovsk Krai, Russian Far East. It has a length of 399 km (248 mi) and a drainage basin of 13,500 square kilometres (5,200 mi^{2}).

The Ulbeya flows across uninhabited territory. Nyadbaki village is located in the upper reaches of the river.

== Course ==
The Urak river originates at the confluence of the Goria and Granitny mountain rivers. The latter has its source at an elevation of nearly 2,200 m (7,200 ft) in the Suntar Khayata Range. It heads roughly southwards below the slopes of the Kukhtuy Range rising to the west. In its last stretch it flows roughly parallel to rivers Inya to the east and Kukhtuy to the west. Finally it flows into the Sea of Okhotsk near the abandoned Ulbeya village that lies east of its mouth.

The main tributaries of the Ulbeya are the 122 kilometres (76 mi) long Assibergan from the left and the 111 kilometres (69 mi) long Ulberikan from the right. The river is fed by snow and rain. It freezes around late October and stays frozen until mid May.

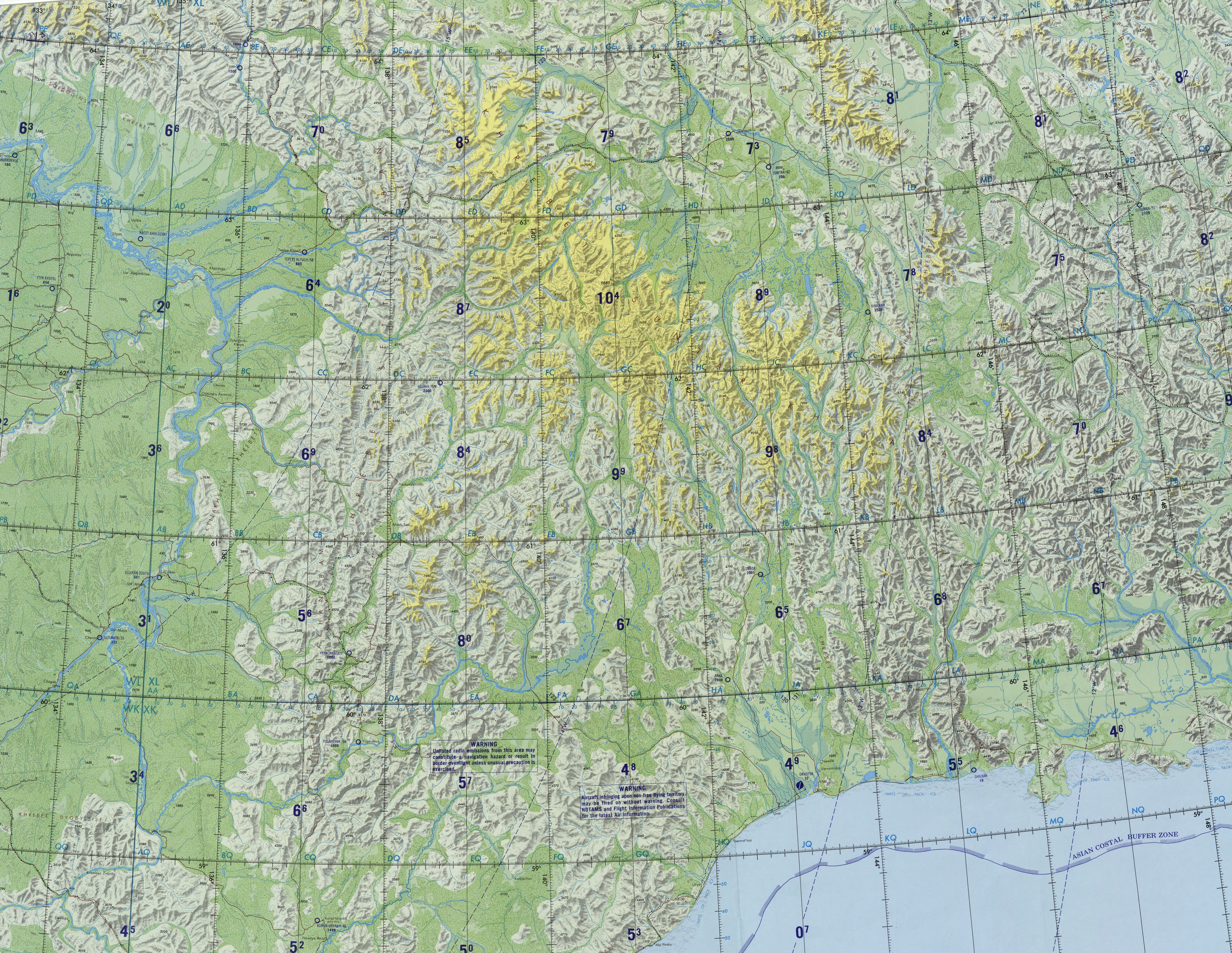
ONC map showing the northern shore of the Sea of Okhotsk.

== Fauna ==
The Ulbeya is a spawning ground for salmon species.

== See also ==
- List of rivers of Russia
