= Okhota =

Okhota Охота
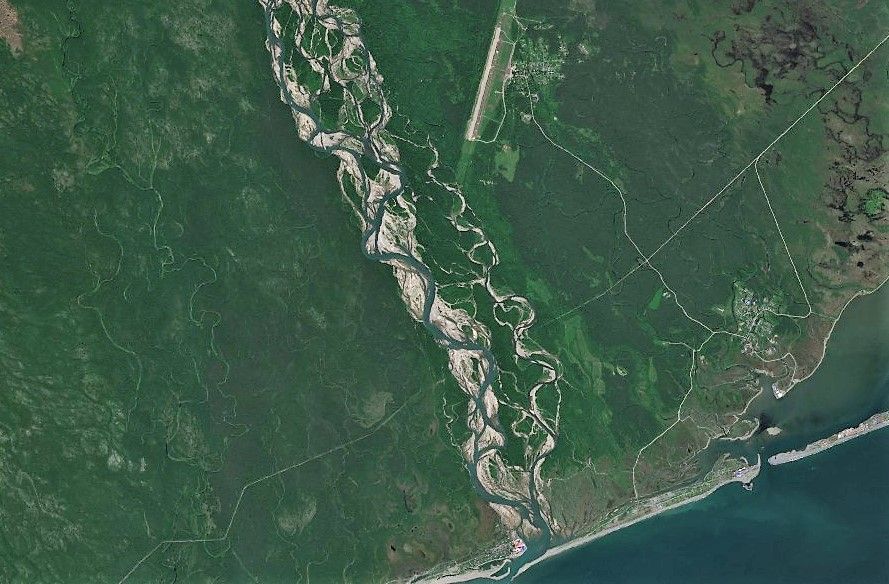
- Last stretch of the Okhota Sentinel-2 image

Location
- Country: Russia

Physical characteristics
- Source
  - location: Suntar-Khayata Range
- Mouth: Sea of Okhotsk
  - coordinates: 59°19′42″N 143°04′21″E
- Length: 393 km (244 mi)
- Basin size: 11,900 km^{2} (4,600 sq mi)
- Discharge
  - average: 200 cubic metres per second (7,100 cu ft/s)

The Okhota (Russian: Охота) is a river in Okhotsky District, Khabarovsk Krai, which flows south to the Sea of Okhotsk. It is 393 kilometres (244 mi) long, and its drainage basin covers 19,100 square kilometres (7,400 sq mi).

== Etymology ==
While the name of the river literally means "hunt" in Russian, it is a corruption of the Even word окат (okat) meaning "river".

== Course ==
The Okhota begins in the Suntar-Khayata Range at about 1,200 metres (3,900 ft) above sea level at the junction of the Left Okhota and Right Okhota rivers. These are about 10 kilometres (6 mi) long and start from an elevation of 1,800 to 2,000 metres (5,900 to 6,600 ft). First it flows as a mountain stream. Further downstream it flows to the west of the Kukhtuy and east of the Urak river. It heads southwards in a wide valley between the Yudoma and Kukhtuy Ranges until its mouth in the Sea of Okhotsk near Novoye Ustye, west of the port town of Okhotsk. The lower reaches of the river are navigable for small craft. The Okhota is frozen from early November to May. Snow cover in the valley can last until late June.

== Flora and fauna ==
The banks of the river are mostly forested. There is an important salmon run. Salvelinus neiva is a char species found in the river basin.

== History ==
In the fur hunting trade, since there are no easy portages to the Okhota, the Russians usually approached Okhotsk from the Urak or the Ulya to the west. The only main route that used the Okhota ran from the "corner" of the Yudoma over the 100-kilometre (62 mi) Okhotsk Portage to the Okhota about 100 kilometres north of its mouth. There was some pasture along the river but not enough to keep many Yakutsk pack-horses over winter. Larch was cut and floated down the river for shipbuilding. Around 1750 there were 37 peasant families and from 1735 a few Yakut cattlemen.

== See also ==
- List of rivers of Russia
