= Kukhtuy =

River in Far East Russia

Kukhtuy Кухтуй
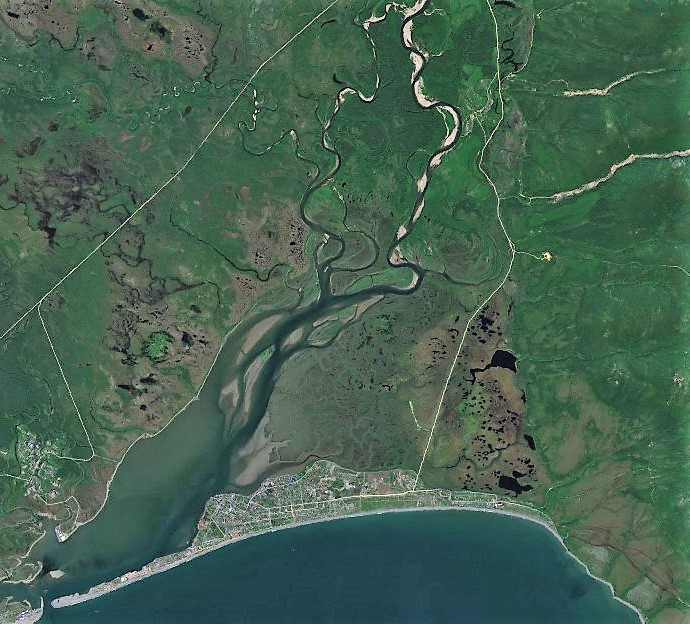
- Last stretch of the Kukhtuy Sentinel-2 image

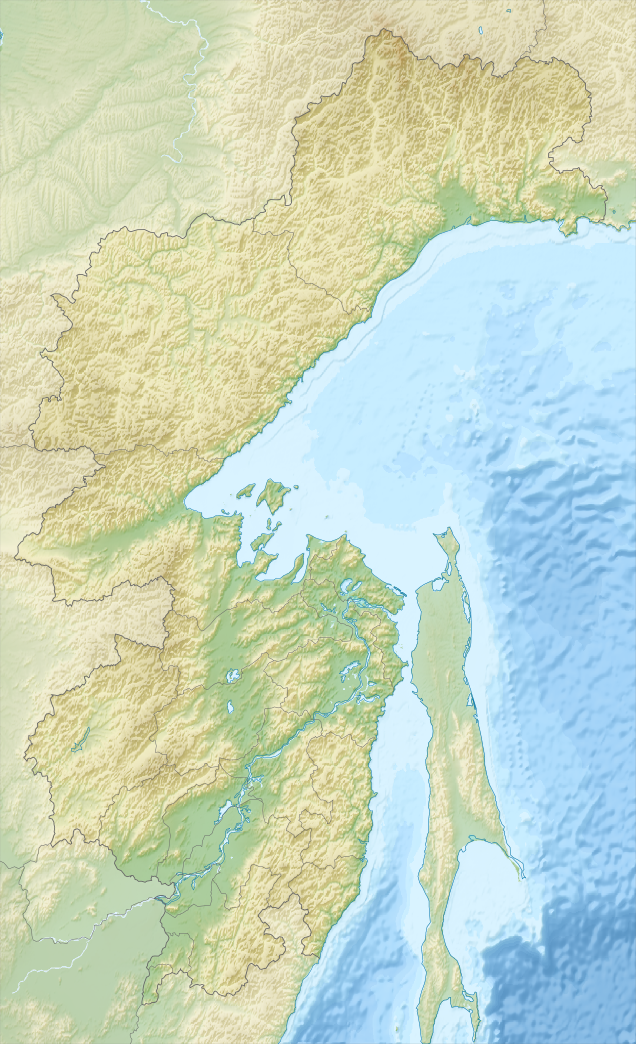
- Mouth location in Khabarovsk Krai, Russia

Location
- Country: Khabarovsk Krai, Russia

Physical characteristics
- Source
  - location: Suntar-Khayata
  - coordinates: 61°54′01″N 143°01′57″E
  - elevation: 1,617 m (5,305 ft)
- Mouth: Sea of Okhotsk
  - location: Okhotsk estuary
  - coordinates: 59°23′50″N 143°14′43″E
  - elevation: 0 m (0 ft)
- Length: 348 km (216 mi)
- Basin size: 8,610 km^{2} (3,320 sq mi)
- Discharge
  - average: 90 m^{3}/s (3,200 cu ft/s)

The Kukhtuy (Russian: Кухтуй) is a river in Okhotsky District, Khabarovsk Krai, Russian Far East. It has a drainage basin of 8,610 square kilometres (3,320 mi^{2}) and a length of 348 km (216 mi).

The river is navigable in its lower reaches.

== Course ==
The Kukhtuy river has its source at an elevation of 1,617 m (5,305 ft) in the Suntar-Khayata range. It flows relatively straight southwards through a mountainous area. The Yudoma Range rises on the right side and the Kukhtuy Range on the left side of its valley and its course is roughly parallel to rivers Okhota to the west and Ulbeya to the east.

South of the 61st parallel the river valley widens and the Kukhtuy meanders across a widening floodplain with many bogs and small lakes. Finally it flows into the Sea of Okhotsk on the northeastern side of the estuary of Okhotsk town.

The main tributary of the Kukhtuy is the 178 kilometres (111 mi) long Gusinka (Гусинка) that joins it from the left. The river freezes around late October and stays frozen until mid May.

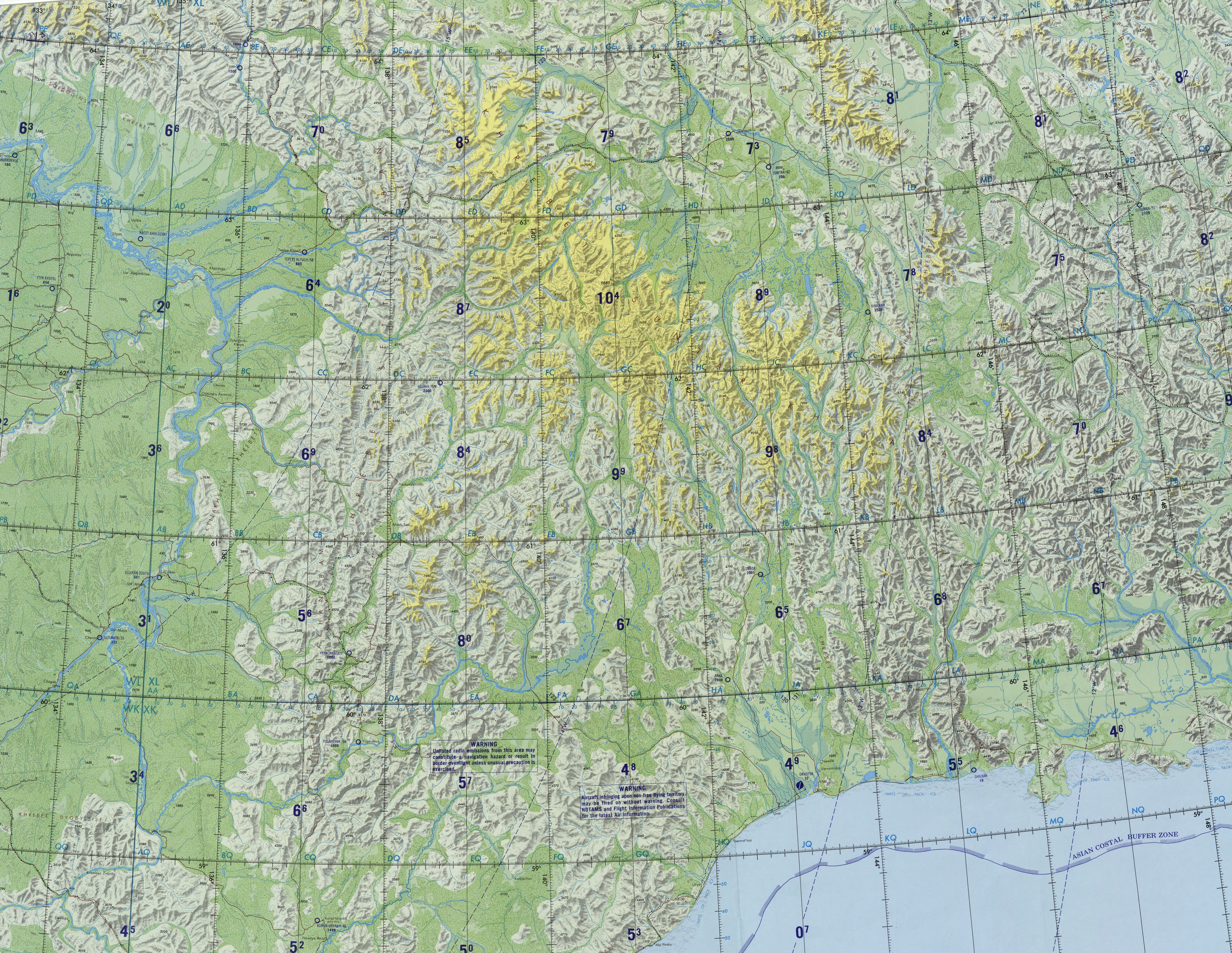
ONC map showing the northern shore of the Sea of Okhotsk.

== Fauna ==
The basin of the Kukhtuy is a spawning ground for the coho salmon. Other fish species are also abundant in its waters, such as the Amur whitefish, East Siberian grayling, whitespotted char and round whitefish.

== See also ==
- List of rivers of Russia
