= Suntar-Khayata Range =

Mountain range in Russia

- Сунтар-Хаята
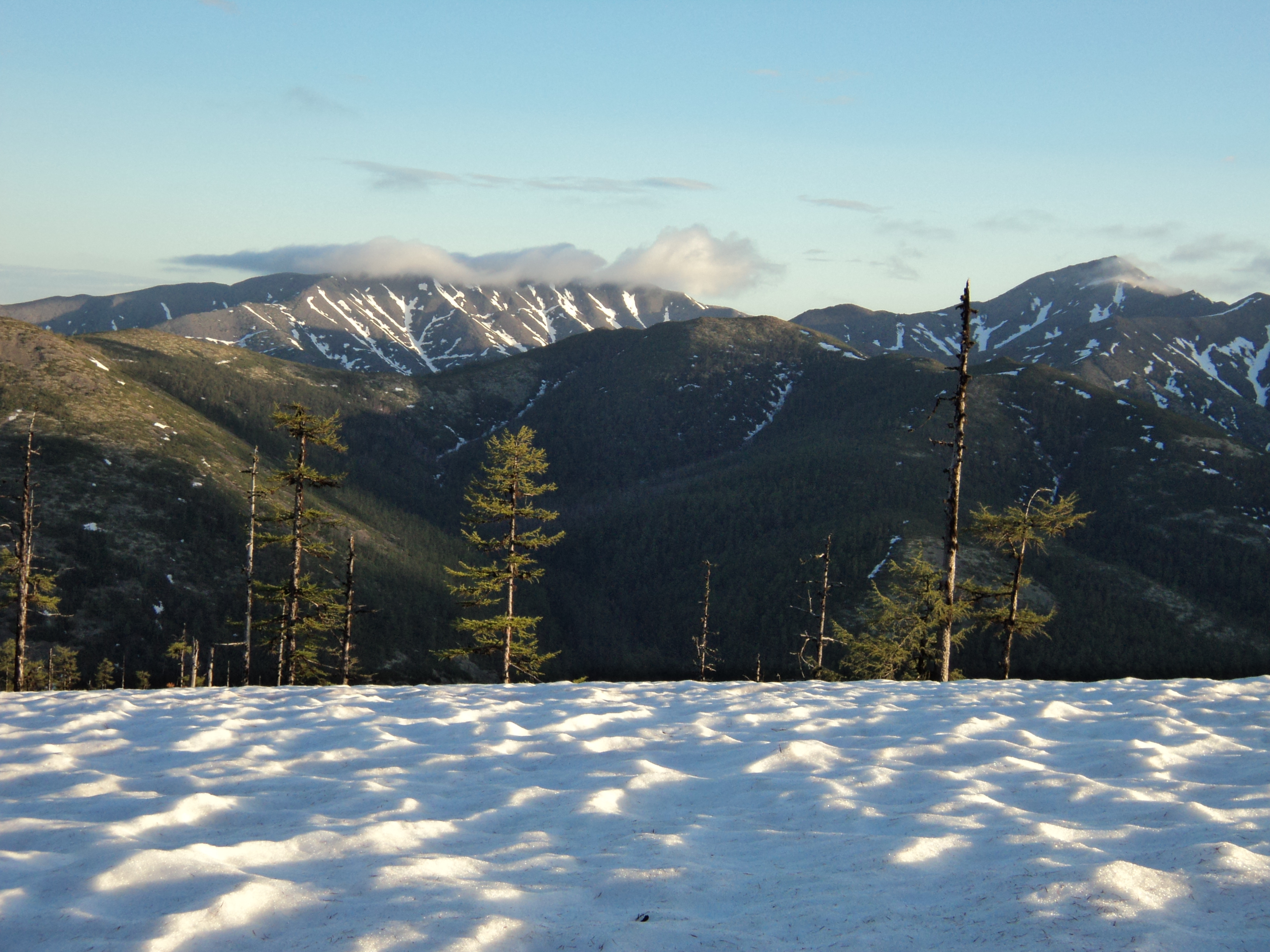
- View of the range in June

Highest point
- Peak: Mus-Khaya
- Elevation: 2,959 m (9,708 ft)

Geography
- Location within Far Eastern Federal District
- Country: Russia
- Region: Sakha/Khabarovsk Krai
- Range coordinates: 62°36′00″N 140°53′00″E
- Parent range: East Siberian System

Geology
- Orogeny: Alpine orogeny
- Rock age: Late Jurassic
- Rock type(s): Volcanic rocks, granite

Suntar-Khayata Range (Russian: Сунтар-Хаята, Yakut: Сунтаар Хайата) is a granite mountain range rising along the border of the Sakha Republic in the north with Amur Oblast and Khabarovsk Krai in the south.

The R504 Kolyma Highway passes through the northern part of the range by Kyubeme.

== Geography ==
The Suntar-Khayata is approximately 450–550 km long and 60 km wide. 2,959 metres (9,708 ft) high Mus-Khaya Mountain, located in the Sakha Republic, is the highest point of the range. Berill Mountain, at 2,933 metres (9,623 ft) is the highest summit in Khabarovsk Krai. Mount Khakandya (Гора Хакандя) is an ultra-prominent peak that is 2,615 metres (8,579 ft) high.

The Suntar-Khayata Range is geographically a southeastern prolongation of the Verkhoyansk Range. Until mid 20th century it was treated as a separate range, together with the Skalisty Range, highest point 2,017 metres (6,617 ft), and the Sette Daban, highest point 2,017 metres (6,617 ft), to the southwest. The Yudoma-Maya Highlands are located to the south of the range and the Upper Kolyma Highlands to the northeast.

=== Subranges ===
The Suntar-Khayata system comprises a number of subranges, including the Khalkan Range, Net-Taga Range, Yudoma Range and Kukhtuy Range.

=== Hydrography ===
The Suntar-Khayata is a watershed divide between the Aldan River, of the Lena basin, and the Indigirka —both of the Arctic Ocean, and the Sea of Okhotsk.

Some of the major watercourses having their source in the range are the Tyry, Eastern Khandyga, Tompo, Allakh-Yun and Yudoma belonging to the Lena basin, the Khastakh, Kuydusun and Taryn-Yuryakh to the Indigirka basin, the Kulu of the Kolyma River basin, while the Okhota, Ulbeya, Inya, Kukhtuy and Yana flow into the Sea of Okhotsk.

The range includes the southernmost glaciers in the Russian Far East outside of Kamchatka. Their status is not known.

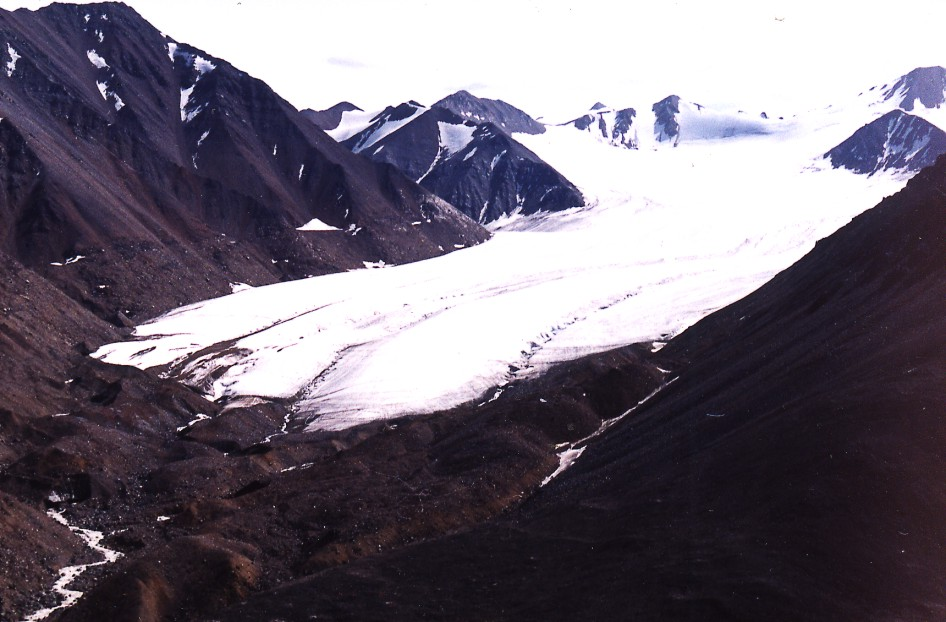
Glacier in the Suntar-Khayata.

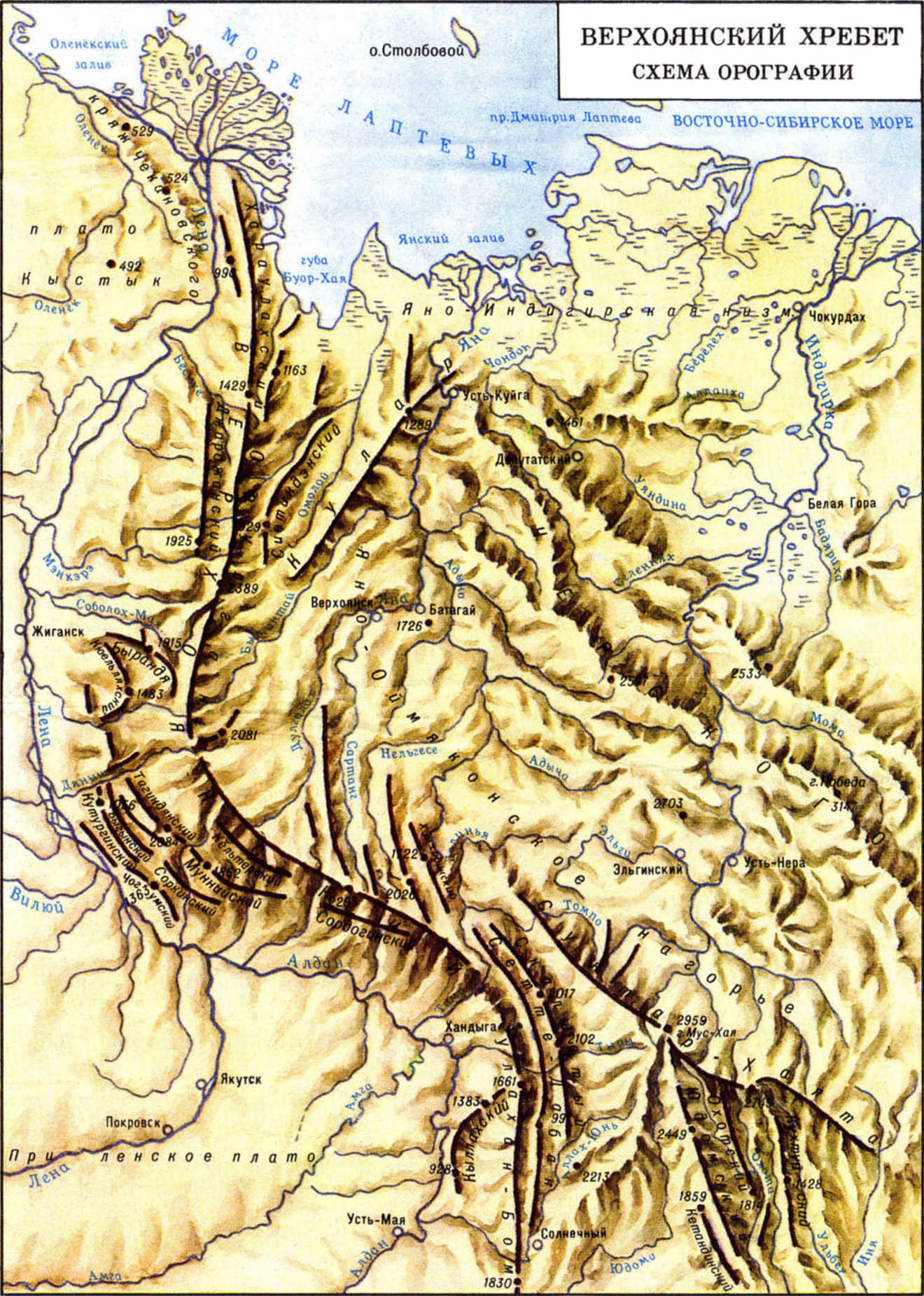
Map of the Verkhoyansk Range] with the Suntar-Khayata in the lower right.

== Geology ==
The strata of this geological formation date back to the Late Jurassic. Dinosaur remains are among the fossils that have been recovered from the formation.

== Flora and fauna ==
The higher slopes of the range are sparsely wooded, with mainly larch forests and tundra.

A small population of Brown Dippers (Cinclus pallasi) winters at a hot spring in the Suntar-Khayata Range. The birds feed underwater when air temperatures drop below −55 °C (−67 °F).

=== Vertebrate paleofauna ===
Indeterminate Carnosauria remains, possible indeterminate Coelurosaur remains, indeterminate Sauropoda remains that had been previously referred to Camarasauridae indet, and indeterminate Theropoda remains have all been recovered from Suntar outcrops in Sakha Republic, Russia.

Dinosaurs of the Suntar Series
Genus	Species	Presence	Notes	Images
cf. Stegosaurus	cf. Stegosaurus sp.	Sakha Republic, Russia.		A specimen of Stegosaurus.

== See also ==
- Lists of dinosaur-bearing stratigraphic units
- List of ultras of Northeast Asia
- Oymyakon Highlands
