= Okhotsk =

Okhotsk Охотск
- Work settlement
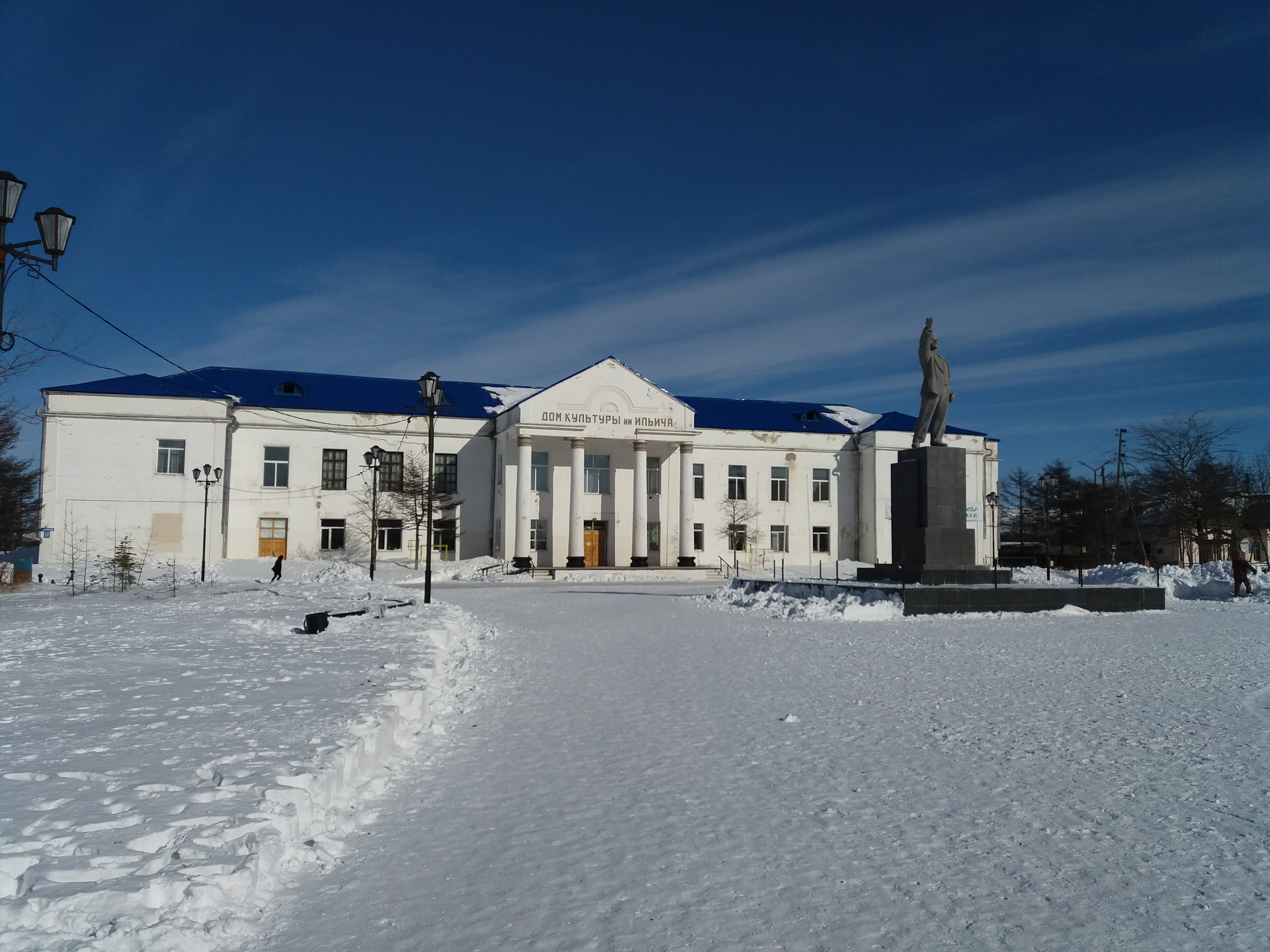
- Monument to Lenin in front of the House of Culture

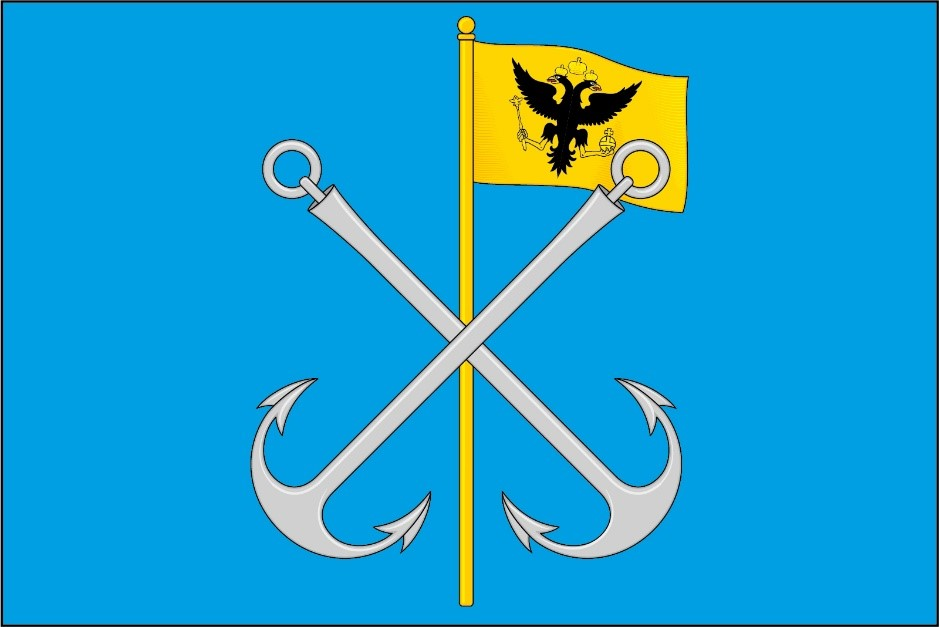
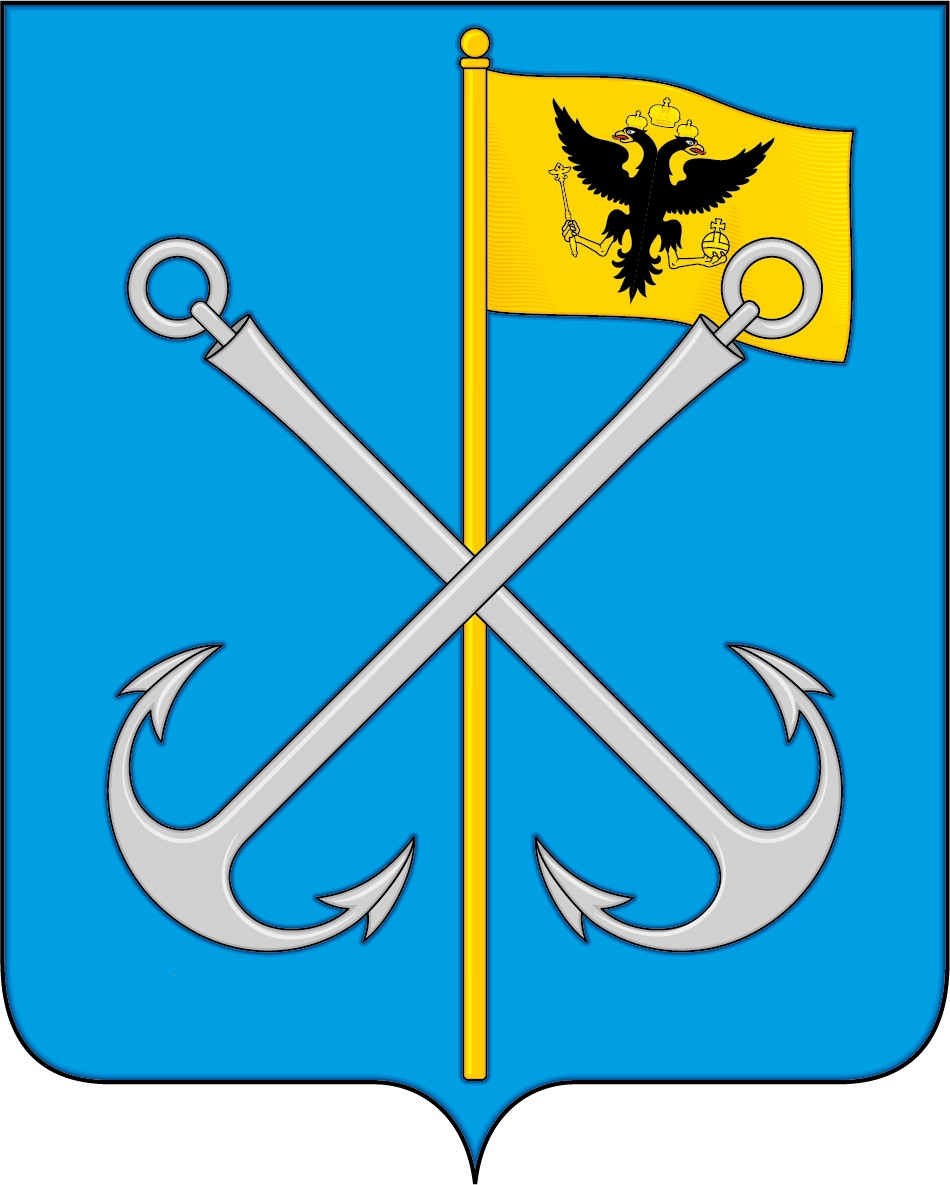
- Flag Coat of arms
- Interactive map of Okhotsk
- Location of Okhotsk Okhotsk (Khabarovsk Krai)
- Coordinates: 59°22′03″N 143°15′34″E
- Country: Russia
- Federal subject: Khabarovsk Krai
- Administrative district: Okhotsky District
- Founded: 1647
- Urban-type settlement status since: 1949
- Elevation: 6 m (20 ft)

Population (2010 Census)
  - Total: 4,215
  - Estimate (2025): 3,138 (−25.6%)

Administrative status
  - Capital of: Okhotsky District
- Time zone: UTC+10 (MSK+7)
- Postal code: 682480
- Dialing code: +7 42141
- OKTMO ID: 08634151051

Okhotsk (Russian: Охотск, IPA: [ɐˈxotsk]) is an urban locality (a work settlement) and the administrative center of Okhotsky District of Khabarovsk Krai, Russia, located at the mouth of the Okhota River on the Sea of Okhotsk. Population: 4,215 (2010 census); 5,738 (2002 census); 9,298 (1989 Soviet census).

== Etymology ==
It was named after the Okhota River, whose name is a corrupted Evenk word okat, 'river'.

== History ==
Okhotsk was the main Russian base on the Pacific coast from about 1650 to 1860, but lost its importance after the Amur Annexation in 1860. It is located at the east end of the Siberian River Routes on the Sea of Okhotsk where the Okhota and Kukhtuy rivers join to form a poor but usable harbor.

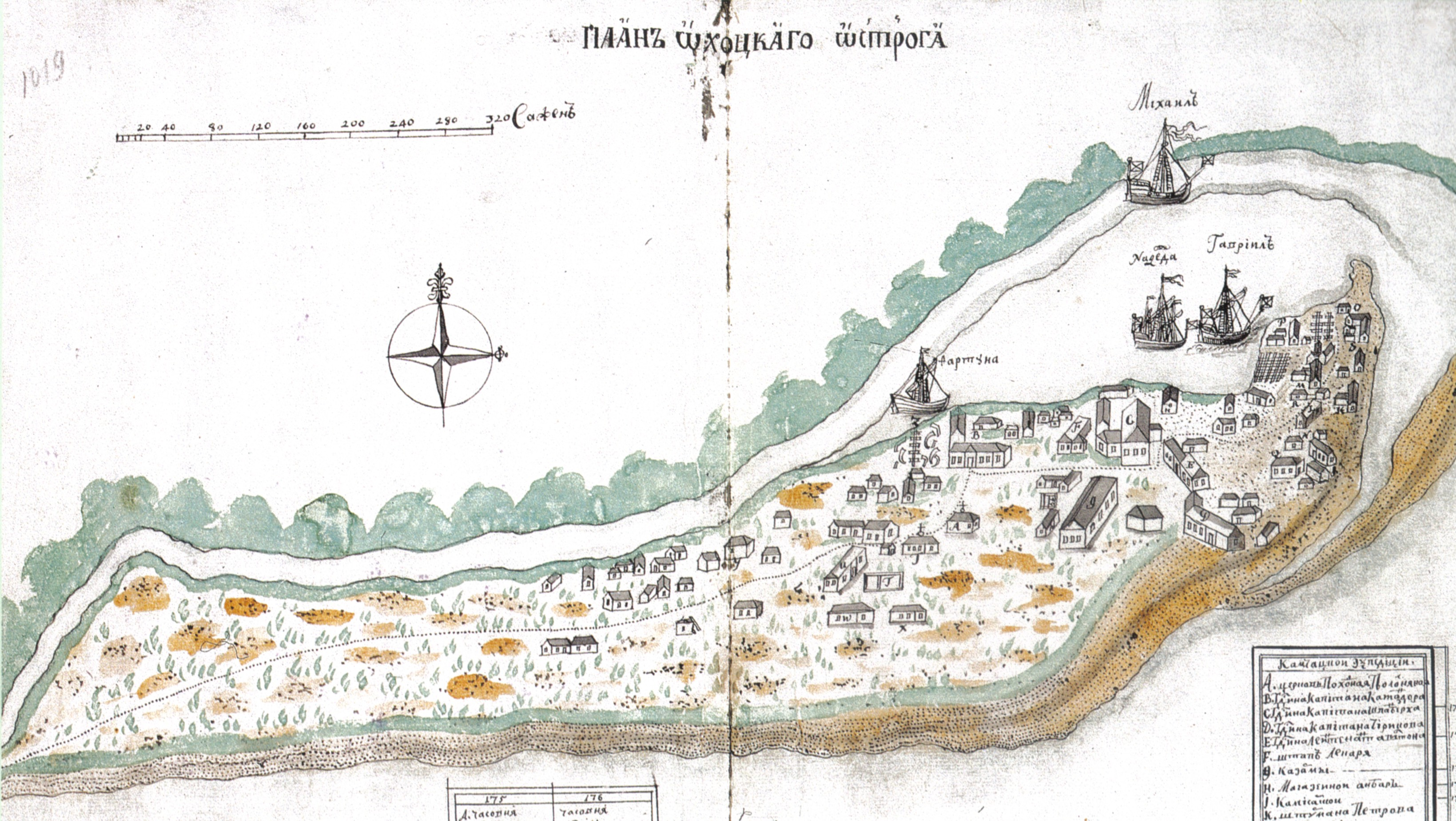
Map of Okhotskoy Ostrog, ink drawing, 1737

In 1639, Ivan Moskvitin led the first Russian expedition to reach the Pacific, which they did 105 kilometres (65 mi) southwest of Okhotsk at the mouth of the Ulya River. In 1647, Semyon Shelkovnikov built winter quarters at Okhotsk. In 1649, a fort was built (Kosoy Ostrozhok). In 1653, Okhotsk was burned by the local Lamuts. Although the Russian pioneers were skilled builders of river boats, they lacked the knowledge and equipment to build seagoing vessels, which meant that Okhotsk remained a coastal settlement and not a port. In 1682, Okhotsk had eight dwellings and five other buildings. When the Russians entered the Kamchatka Peninsula, they had to travel overland from the north.

In 1714, Peter the Great sent a party of shipbuilders to Okhotsk to provide faster access to the furs of Kamchatka. In 1715, they built the vessel Vostok, and in 1716–17, Kozma Sokolov sailed it to Kamchatka. For the next 145 years, Okhotsk was the main Russian seaport on the Pacific, supplying Kamchatka and other coastal settlements. In 1731, the Siberian Military Flotilla was established here. In 1736, Okhotsk was moved 3 km (2 mi) downstream to a spit of land at the mouth of the Okhota River, converting the ostrog into a proper port. Vitus Bering's two Pacific expeditions (the First Kamchatka expedition of 1725–1729 and the Great Northern Expedition of 1733–1742) brought in large numbers of people, including the first scholars and expert sailors, and led to a great deal of building. In 1742, there were fifty-seven already established buildings, forty-five newer buildings in Bering's "expedition settlement", and eight ships in the harbor. Anton de Vieira was the town's governor at that time; he was of Portuguese origin, son of a Jewish father and Christian mother. From 1737 to 1837, there was a salt works several kilometers west on the coast that produced 14–36 tons of salt annually; in 1827, it was worked by a hundred and fifty exiles and about a hundred guards and overseers.

Bering's men found valuable sea otters east of Kamchatka, and fur hunters began island-hopping along the Aleutian Islands. Furs were brought back to Okhotsk and carried inland, mostly to be sold to the Chinese at Kyakhta. The Russian-American Company was founded in 1799 with its base at Okhotsk, which brought in more money to the town. In 1822 the Scottish traveler Captain John Cochrane ranked Okhotsk just after Barnaul as the neatest, cleanest, and most pleasant town he had seen in Siberia.

From at least 1715, it was clear that Okhotsk was a poor site for a city. In addition to the difficult track inland, the harbor was poor, and the short growing season and lack of plowland meant that food had to be imported. Around 1750, there were only thirty-seven peasant families and a number of Yakut cattlemen living there. There was so little pasture in the area that pack horses sometimes had to be returned to Yakutsk unloaded. The harbor was ice-free from May to November, but the sailing season ran only from June through September. The town was built on a low, narrow spit blocking the mouths of the two rivers. The harbor inside the spit was large but shallow; three-quarters of it was a mud flat during low water. Large ships could cross the bar only on a high tide. Ice-choked water during the spring breakup frequently flooded the town (twenty times from 1723 to 1813), as did high surf on a number of occasions. In 1810, the Okhota River, its mouth jammed by ice, cut a new channel through the spit and isolated the townsite; the town was moved to the spit east of the harbor mouth five years later. Goods now had to be unloaded and barged across the harbor; because the harbor was shallow, Yakuts had to wade with loads from shore to barge. Fresh water had to be fetched from 4 km (2 1/2 mi) away. Goods could not be brought down along the Kukhtuy River because of swamps.

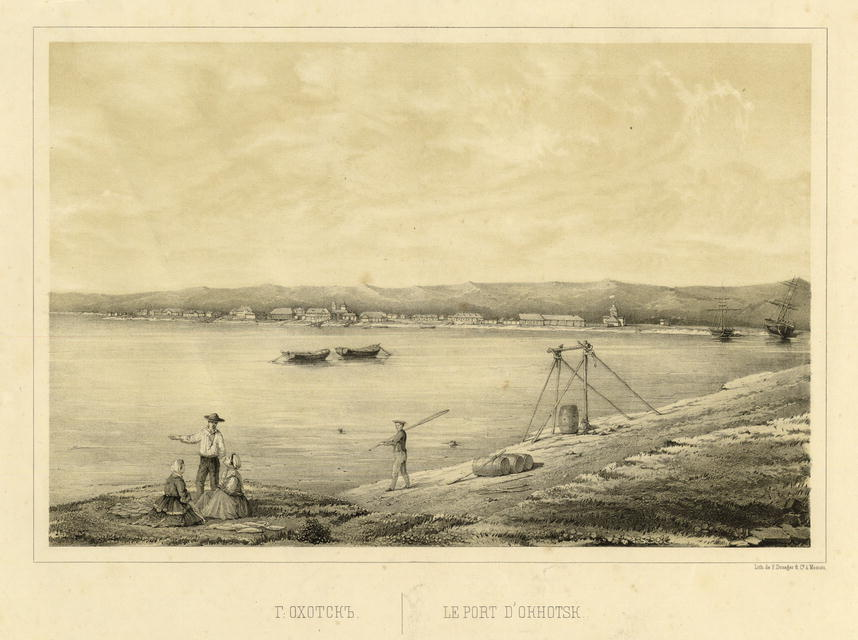
Okhotsk in 1857

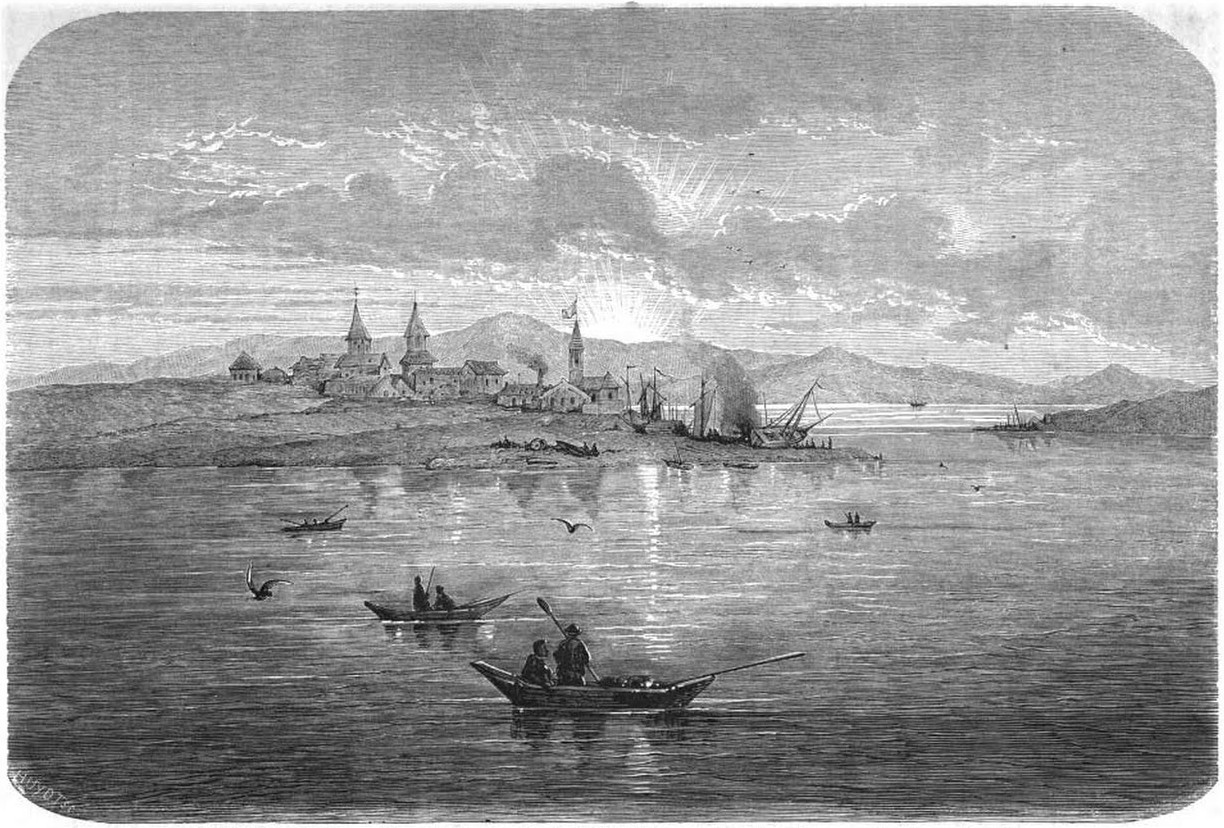
Okhotsk in 1860

In 1840, Vasily Zavoyko became head of the Russian-American Company post at Okhotsk and decided to move the post south to Ayan, a move that was completed in 1845. The Yakutsk-Ayan Track was built and then rebuilt in 1852 at a cost of 20,000 rubles, bypassing Okhotsk. In 1849, Siberian governor Nikolay Muravyov-Amursky followed the Russian-American Company's example and decided to move the Siberian Flotilla to Petropavlovsk-Kamchatsky and other government facilities to Ayan. The Amur Annexation in 1860 continued the shift of Russian focus to the south. From 1870, Okhotsk was supplied from Nikolayevsk-on-Amur. Further loss of importance came in 1867 when Russian America (Alaska) was sold to the United States. The total population decline of Okhotsk went from 1,660 in 1839 to one hundred in 1865.

Between 1849 and 1866, American whaleships cruised for bowhead whales in the waters off Okhotsk. Some caught whales within sight of the settlement while others visited the town itself. They also fished for salmon in the Okhota River.

Okhotsk was of some military importance during the Russian Civil War, when the White Army generals Vasily Rakitin and Anatoly Pepelyayev used it as their place of arms in the Far East.

Okhotsk was also a launch site of sounding rockets between 1981 and 2005. The rockets reached altitudes of up to 1,000 km (620 mi).

The importance and population of Okhotsk sharply declined following the demise of the Soviet Union.

== Transportation ==
Okhotsk is served by the Okhotsk Airport.

== Climate ==
Okhotsk has a subarctic climate (Köppen climate classification Dwc) with very cold, dry winters and mild, wet summers.

Climate data for Okhotsk (1991−2020, extremes 1891–present)
Month	Jan	Feb	Mar	Apr	May	Jun	Jul	Aug	Sep	Oct	Nov	Dec	Year
Record high °C (°F)	5.5 (41.9)	2.0 (35.6)	6.4 (43.5)	16.0 (60.8)	26.2 (79.2)	31.3 (88.3)	31.0 (87.8)	32.1 (89.8)	24.8 (76.6)	15.7 (60.3)	6.2 (43.2)	2.8 (37.0)	32.1 (89.8)
Mean daily maximum °C (°F)	−16.8 (1.8)	−14.2 (6.4)	−6.3 (20.7)	0.4 (32.7)	6.2 (43.2)	11.4 (52.5)	15.7 (60.3)	17.1 (62.8)	12.9 (55.2)	2.7 (36.9)	−9.7 (14.5)	−16.4 (2.5)	0.3 (32.5)
Daily mean °C (°F)	−19.9 (−3.8)	−18.5 (−1.3)	−12.1 (10.2)	−3.8 (25.2)	2.6 (36.7)	8.1 (46.6)	12.9 (55.2)	13.7 (56.7)	8.9 (48.0)	−1.2 (29.8)	−12.7 (9.1)	−19.0 (−2.2)	−3.4 (25.9)
Mean daily minimum °C (°F)	−22.7 (−8.9)	−22.2 (−8.0)	−17.8 (0.0)	−8.2 (17.2)	−0.2 (31.6)	5.7 (42.3)	10.6 (51.1)	10.6 (51.1)	4.9 (40.8)	−4.6 (23.7)	−15.3 (4.5)	−21.4 (−6.5)	−6.7 (19.9)
Record low °C (°F)	−41.3 (−42.3)	−45.7 (−50.3)	−36.9 (−34.4)	−29.2 (−20.6)	−16.0 (3.2)	−2.6 (27.3)	1.7 (35.1)	−0.1 (31.8)	−6.6 (20.1)	−27.5 (−17.5)	−37.4 (−35.3)	−37.7 (−35.9)	−45.7 (−50.3)
Average precipitation mm (inches)	15 (0.6)	7 (0.3)	16 (0.6)	24 (0.9)	40 (1.6)	55 (2.2)	85 (3.3)	94 (3.7)	92 (3.6)	66 (2.6)	32 (1.3)	14 (0.6)	540 (21.3)
Average rainy days	0.1	0.2	0.3	2	11	16	18	15	16	7	1	0.2	87
Average snowy days	9	9	11	13	10	0.4	0	0	0.3	9	11	8	81
Average relative humidity (%)	63	63	68	77	84	88	89	86	80	70	66	63	75
Mean monthly sunshine hours	113.4	158.7	229.6	227.1	204.1	180.8	170.9	175.6	173.2	166.0	110.1	87.2	1,996.7
Source 1: Pogoda.ru.net
Source 2: NOAA
