= Mus-Khaya Mountain =

Mountain in Yakutia, Russia

Mus-Khaya
- Location within Far Eastern Federal District

Highest point
- Elevation: 2,973 m (9,754 ft)
- Prominence: 1,936 m (6,352 ft)
- Listing: Ultra, Ribu
- Coordinates: 62°36′12″N 140°56′21″E

Geography
- Location: Sakha Republic, Russia
- Parent range: Suntar-Khayata Range; East Siberian Mountains

Mus-Khaya (Russian: Мус-Хая, Yakut: Муус Хайа) is a mountain in Sakha Republic, Russia and the highest point of the Suntar-Khayata Range with an elevation of 2,973 m (9,754 ft) or 2,959 m (9,708 ft).

The mountain is located 485 km (301 mi) south of the Arctic Circle and 135 km (84 mi) southwest of Oymyakon.

Mus-Khaya means Icy Mountain in Sakha.

== See also ==
- List of mountains of Russia
- List of ultras of Northeast Asia
