= Mount Khakandya =

Peak in the Suntar-Khayata Range, East Siberian System, Russia

- Гора Хакандя
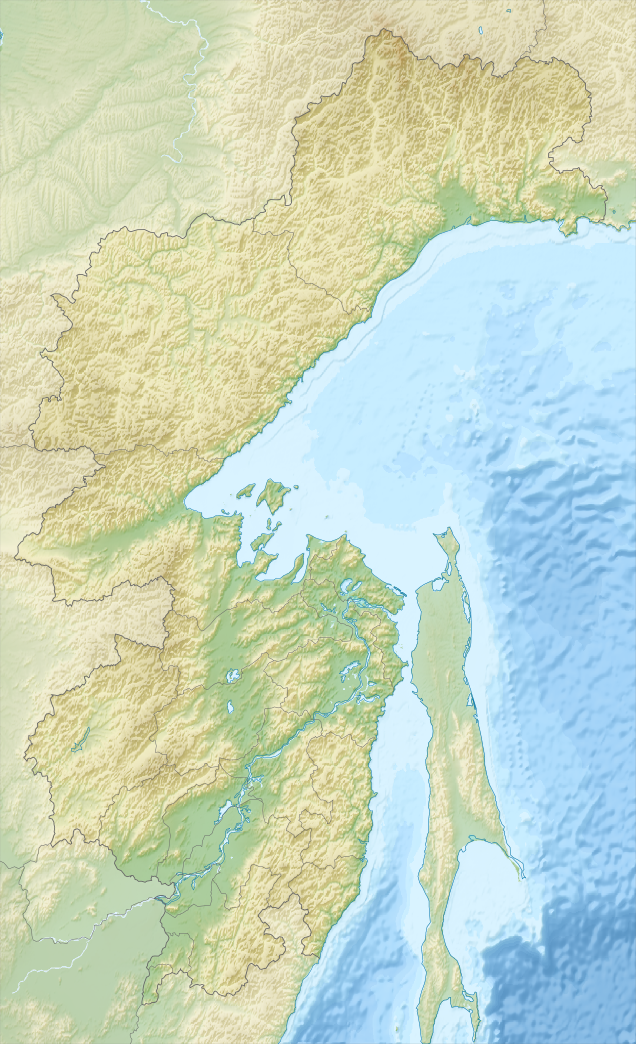
- Location within Khabarovsk Krai

Highest point
- Elevation: 2,615 m (8,579 ft)
- Prominence: 1,545 m (5,069 ft)
- Listing: List of ultras of Northeast Asia, Ribu
- Coordinates: 61°36′02″N 142°50′14″E

Geography
- Location: Khabarovsk Krai, Russia
- Parent range: Suntar-Khayata Range

Mount Khakandya (Russian: Гора Хакандя) is a peak in the Suntar-Khayata Range, East Siberian System, Russia.

Administratively it is located in the Khabarovsk Krai of the Russian Far East.

== See also ==
- List of mountains and hills of Russia
- List of ultras of Northeast Asia
