= Okhotsky District =

Okhotsky District Охотский район (Russian)
- District
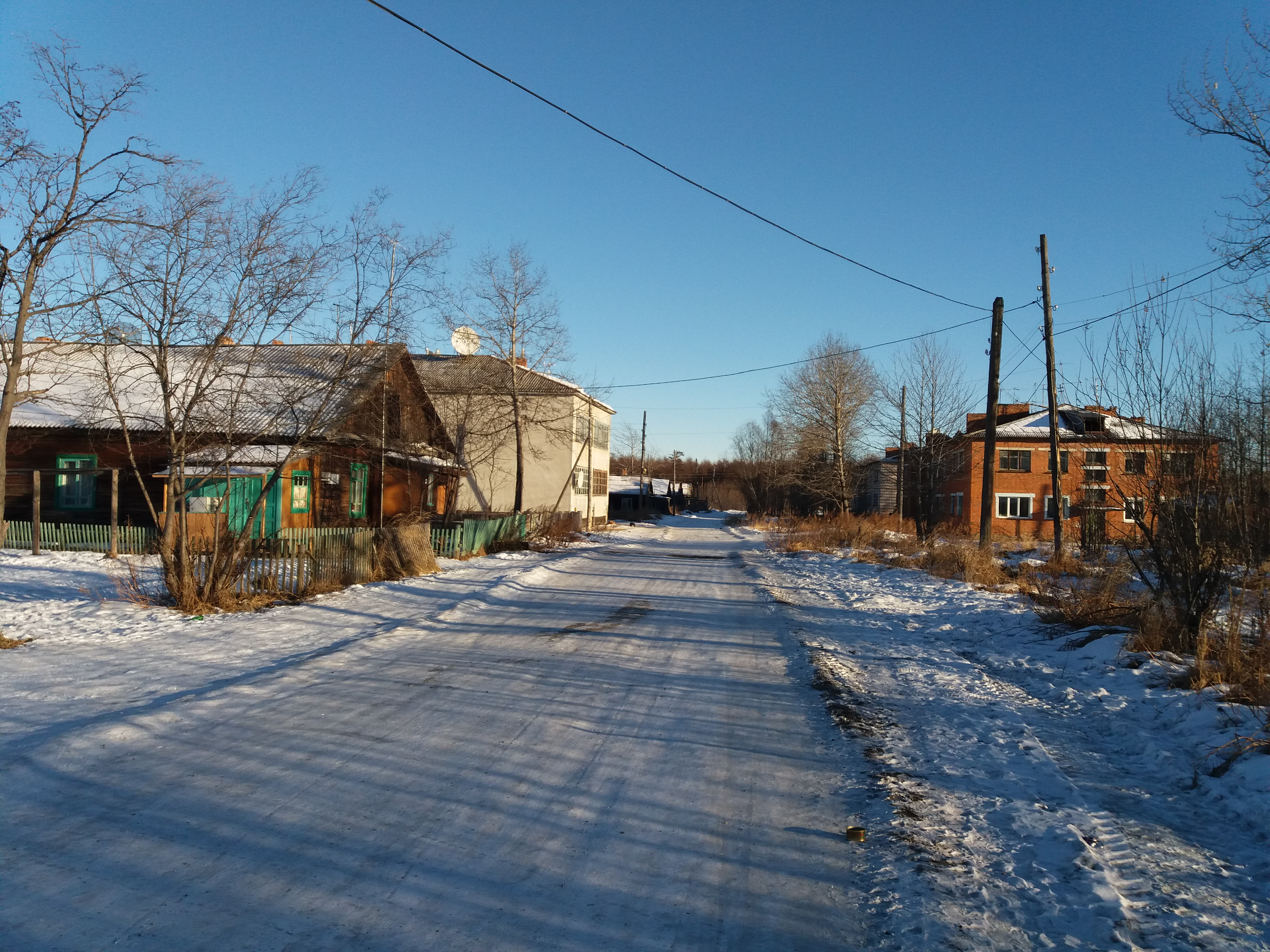
- Village Aeroport, Okhotsky District

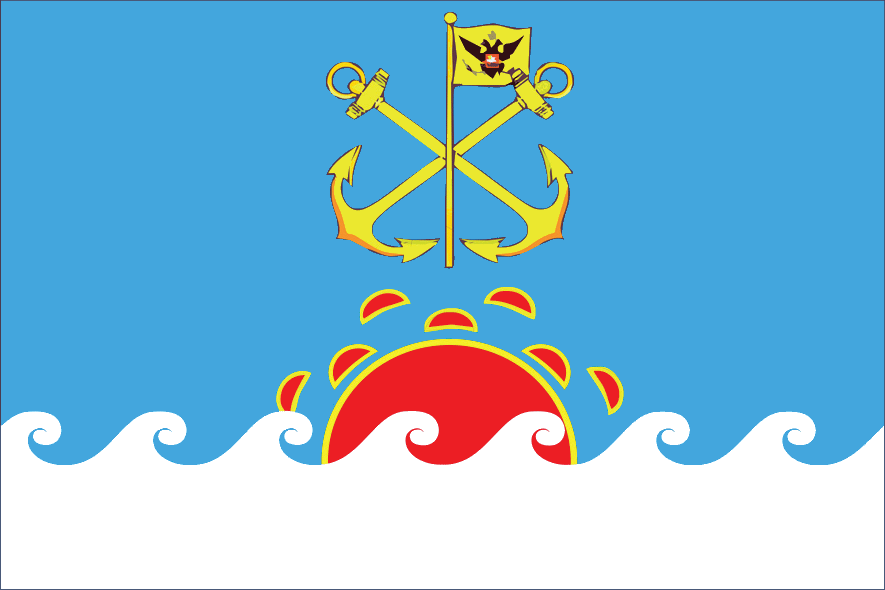
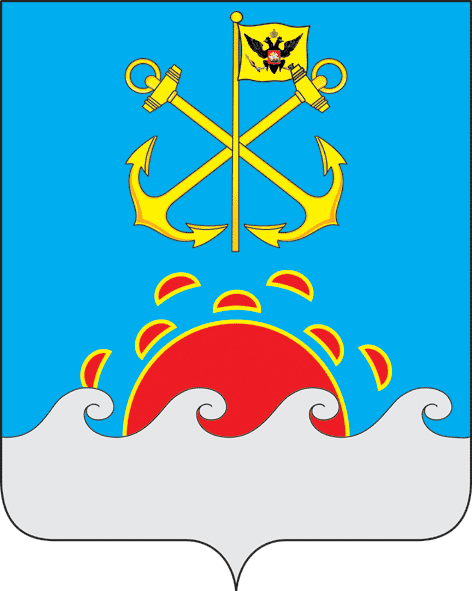
- Flag Coat of arms
- Location of Okhotsky District in Khabarovsk Krai
- Coordinates: 60°N 142°E
- Country: Russia
- Federal subject: Khabarovsk Krai
- Established: 4 January 1926
- Administrative center: Okhotsk

Area
  - Total: 158,517.8 km^{2} (61,204.1 sq mi)

Population (2010 Census)
  - Total: 8,197
  - Density: 0.05171/km^{2} (0.1339/sq mi)
  - Urban: 51.4%
  - Rural: 48.6%

Administrative structure
  - Inhabited localities: 1 urban-type settlements, 13 rural localities

Municipal structure
  - Municipally incorporated as: Okhotsky Municipal District
  - Municipal divisions: 1 urban settlements, 7 rural settlements
- Time zone: UTC+10 (MSK+7)
- OKTMO ID: 08634000
- Website: http://www.admohotsk.ru/

Okhotsky District (Russian: Охо́тский райо́н) is an administrative and municipal district (raion), one of the seventeen in Khabarovsk Krai, Russia. It is located in the north of the krai. The area of the district is 158,517.8 square kilometers (61,204.1 sq mi). Its administrative center is the urban locality (a work settlement) of Okhotsk. Population: 8,197 (2010 census); 12,017 (2002 census); 19,183 (1989 Soviet census). The population of Okhotsk accounts for 51.4% of the district's total population.

== Geography ==
Located along the northwestern coast of the Sea of Okhotsk, it is the northernmost district of Khabarovsk Krai. The main rivers are the Yudoma, Maya and Allakh-Yun of the Lena basin, the Inya, Ulbeya, Okhota, Kukhtuy, Urak and Ulya with their mouths in the Sea of Okhotsk, and the Kullu, a tributary of the Kolyma of the East Siberian Sea basin.

== Demographics ==
Ethnic composition (2021):

- Russians – 78.2%
- Evens – 11.5%
- Evenks – 4.5%
- Koreans – 1.1%
- Yakuts – 1.0%
- Others – 3.7%
