= Bosco Grande nature reserve =

Nature reserve in Pavia, Italy

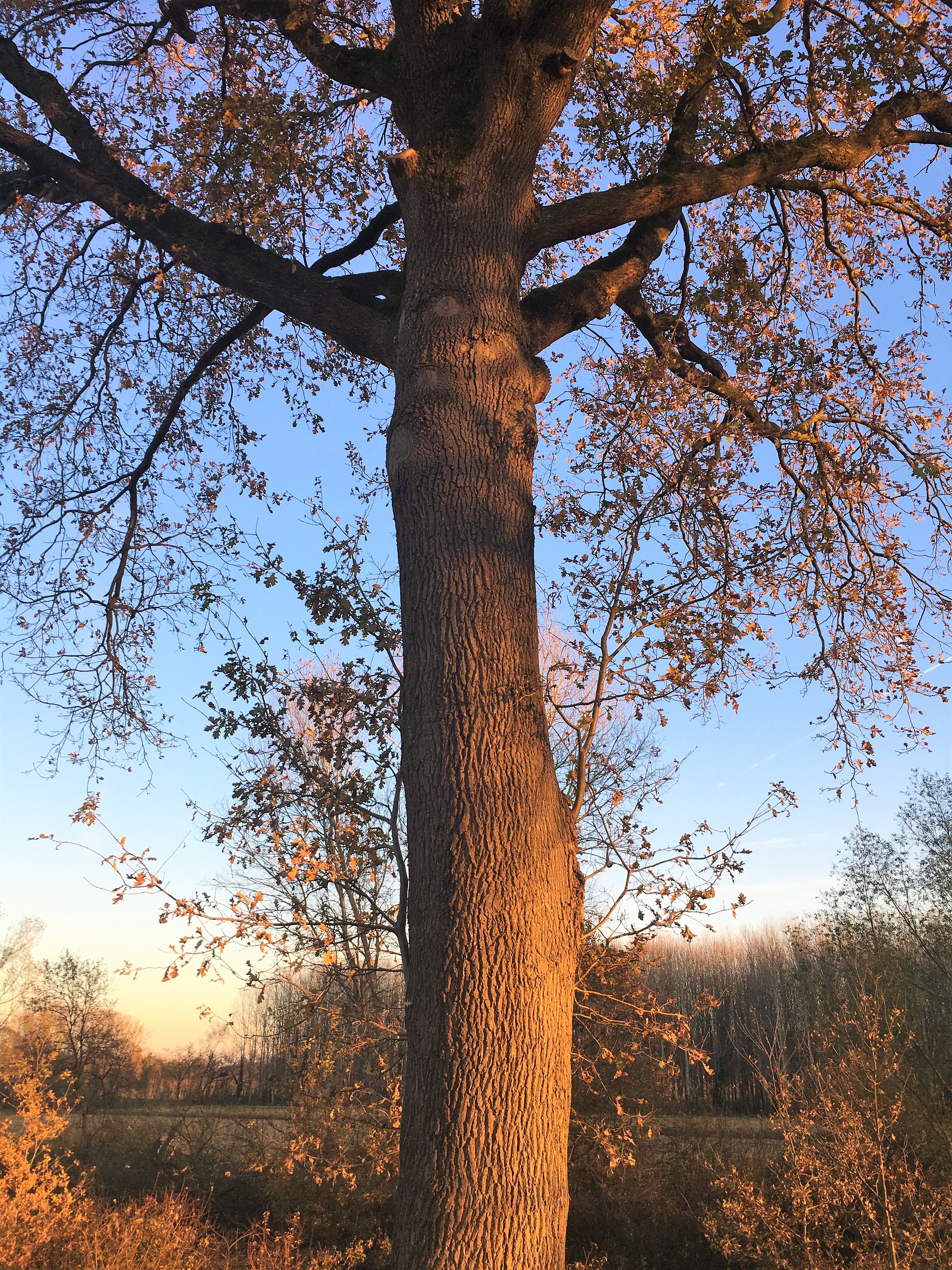
- Interactive map of Bosco Grande nature reserve
- Type: Nature reserve
- Location: Pavia
- Coordinates: 45.182°N 9.113°E
- Created: 1968
- Operator: Municipality of Pavia
- Website: http://www.amicideiboschi.it/chi.html

The Bosco Grande is a nature reserve owned by the municipality of Pavia, Italy and included in the Parco naturale lombardo della Valle del Ticino.

== History ==
The Bosco Grande covers an area of about 22 hectares (corresponding to approximately 54,34 acres) southwest of Pavia, it represents one of the last remnants of that lowland forest that in past times entirely covered the Po Valley and of which an important testimony remains in the Ticino Park. Like other natural reserves of the plain, its conservation derives from the fact that it was a hunting reserve: in 1968 Giuseppe Negri, a lamber dealer passionate about nature, left the park as an inheritance to the municipality (while in 1967 he left the nearby Strict nature reserve Bosco Siro Negri to the university of Pavia so that the private reserve could be known and enjoyed by all. The park also contains a 19th-century farmhouse, located about 500 meters from the course of the Ticino. Between 1977 and 1981 the municipality completely renovated the farmhouse where the library, offices, kitchen and educational laboratories are located, there are also didactic farms of chickens, sheep and goats and a vegetable garden. Tables, benches and a lawn area for children's games were then set up among the fruit trees. Since 1995 the Amici dei Boschi Association (active environmental education and teaching and naturalistic animation for children and teenagers) has collaborated with the municipality, thanks to a special agreement, in the management of the park, organizing with the collaboration of naturalists specialized in education environmental educational initiatives aimed at learning about the natural world, including through play. A didactic path has been created inside the wood, enriched with arrows and explanatory panels, but, in order not to spoil the natural balance of the place and the rich fauna, it can only be accessed during guided tours.

== Fauna ==
The animal component of the reserve is particularly rich and interesting. There are numerous species of birds that nest in the foliage of the trees and in the bushes of the reserve, among these are: tawny owls, eurasian blackcaps, little owls, eurasian sparrow hawks, woodpeckers, common kingfisher, Cetti's warblers, pheasants, mallards, common moorhens and many others. There are several species of mammals that populate the park, including: brown long-eared bats, edible dormice, squirrels, hares, badgers, foxes, weasels and wild boars.

== Flora ==
The reserve, together with the complex of the other lowland forests of the Ticino Valley, represents one of the very rare examples of forest vegetation of the Po Valley, of very low anthropic disturbance and represents an ancient naturalistic botanical heritage. The maximum height of the tallest trees is around 30/35 meters. The most common species are English oaks, elms, hornbeams and black poplars, while in the more humid areas there are silver poplars, common alders and white willows. A non-native essence is also fairly widespread: Robinia pseudoacacia. The shrub layer is also very rich, which offers nourishment and shelter to many animals. There are hazelnuts, common hawthorns and elderberries, while the grassy layer is characterized by the presence of anemones, dog's tooth violets, horsetails, lesser periwinkles and wood violets.
