= Parco naturale lombardo della Valle del Ticino =

Nature reserve in Lombardy, Italy

Parco Naturale Lombardo Della Valle Del Ticino
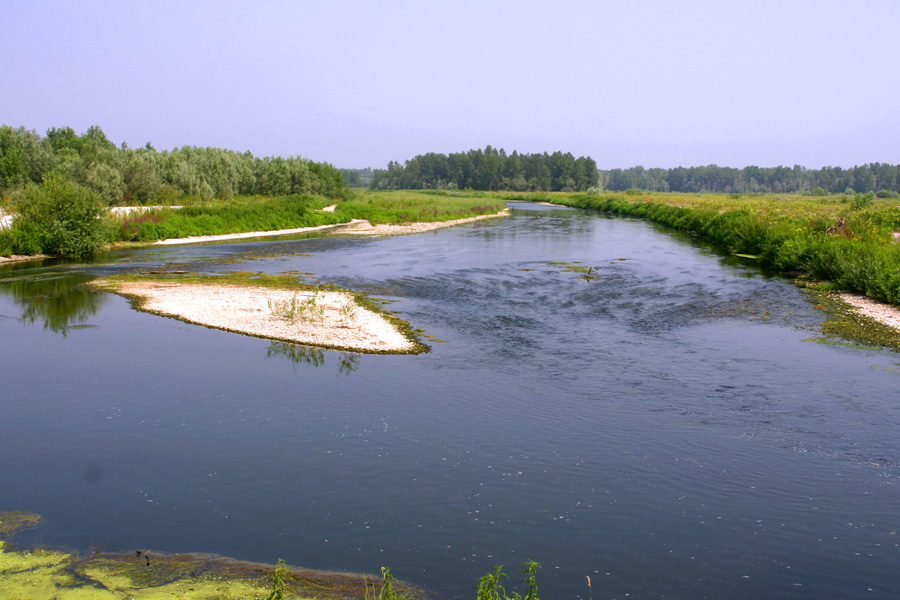
- Interactive map of Parco Naturale Lombardo Della Valle Del Ticino
- Location: Varese, Milano, Pavia, Italy
- Coordinates: 45°26′N 8°49′E
- Area: 918 km^{2} (354 sq mi)
- Established: 1974
- Administrator: Consortium between municipalities and the provinces of Milan, Pavia and Varese
- Website: ente.parcoticino.it

The Parco Naturale Lombardo Della Valle Del Ticino is a Nature reserve established on 9 January 1974. It was the first Italian regional park to be established and the first European river park. The park is located along the banks of the river Ticino, in Lombardy, in the provinces of Milan, Pavia and Varese, in an area of 91,410 hectares (2,2588 acres) between Lake Maggiore and the Po. The park borders the Parco naturale della Valle del Ticino, located on the other side of the river in Piedmont, created in 1978. In 2022 the two Parks were included by UNESCO in the World Network of Biosphere Reserves.

== Geomorphology ==
The river Ticino was born in Switzerland. Its main source is at the head of the Bedretto valley, at the Nufenen Pass, at about 2,480 meters (8,130 ft), while another source is near the Hospice of San Gottardo (Gotthard Pass) and connects to the first in Airolo; from here the river continues in Swiss territory flowing in a valley to the mouth of the Piana di Magadino, where it flows into Lake Maggiore. Once out of Lake Maggiore, near Sesto Calende, Ticino crosses the entire Lombard plain, digging it deeply and ending, a few kilometers south of Pavia, in the Po, in Ponte della Becca. The territory of Ticino downstream of Lake Maggiore can be geomorphologically and naturalistically divided into five different zones: the amphitheater of the moraines or hilly area; the dry plateau; the high plain area; the irrigated plain that includes the belt of the Karst springs and finally the valley of the river proper. Each of these bands has a different altitude. From Lake Maggiore to Somma Lombardo, Ticino flows forming meanders embedded in deep gorges, dug into moraine deposits. Then, from Somma Lombardo to Motta Visconti, he changed his physiognomy: the riverbed widened to cover a width of about three kilometers, forming numerous islands of gravel or sand. Finally, from Motta Visconti to Pavia and its mouth in the Po, the riverbed becomes more regular and the river becomes deeper and navigable.

== Ecosystem ==
The Ticino Valley contains a composite mosaic of natural environments, represented by the river and an articulated system of lateral wetlands, by arid meadows and heaths, by the largest and best preserved surfaces of the plain forest, as well as traditional agricultural landscapes that represent typical semi-natural ecosystems, among which stand out in particular the paddy fields, of great importance for water birds (nesting and migratory), and water-meadows.The extension and complexity of these ecosystems, unique in the context of general impoverishment that the Po Valley offers today, means that they are not only reservoirs of biodiversity, but also corridors and rest areas to facilitate the dispersion and migration of species, making Ticino the most important ecological corridor between the Alps and the Apennines, essential link of biological connection between continental Europe, the Mediterranean basin and Africa. Ticino Park is crossed by migratory routes that every year are flown by birds from Africa to Northern Europe and vice versa, but the protected area is also one of the most important Italian inland wetlands, fundamental for the wintering of many species of waterfowl and habitats of choice of many amphibians, including the Pelobates fuscus, endangered species, which has in the Park the most important population in the world. The forest environments present in the protected area include alder, willow, populus, chestnut and pine forests of Pinus sylvestris, but among the types of forest that most characterize the landscape of the Ticino Valley stand out above all the English oak woods, still well preserved and equipped with an original kit of herbaceous and shrubby species. These forests constitute the habitat for numerous animal species, now rare and localized in the Lombard Plain; some species have arrived in the Park only recently: the European pine marten, the Black woodpecker and the eurasian Goshawk; others are more known as the Roe deer (reintroduced in 1991) the Red Squirrel, the European Badger, the Lesser and Greater Spotted Woodpecker, the marsh tit, the Eurasian nuthatch and the short-toed treecreeper; among the Amphibians the Agile Frog, the Lataste Frog and the aforementioned Pelobates fuscus.

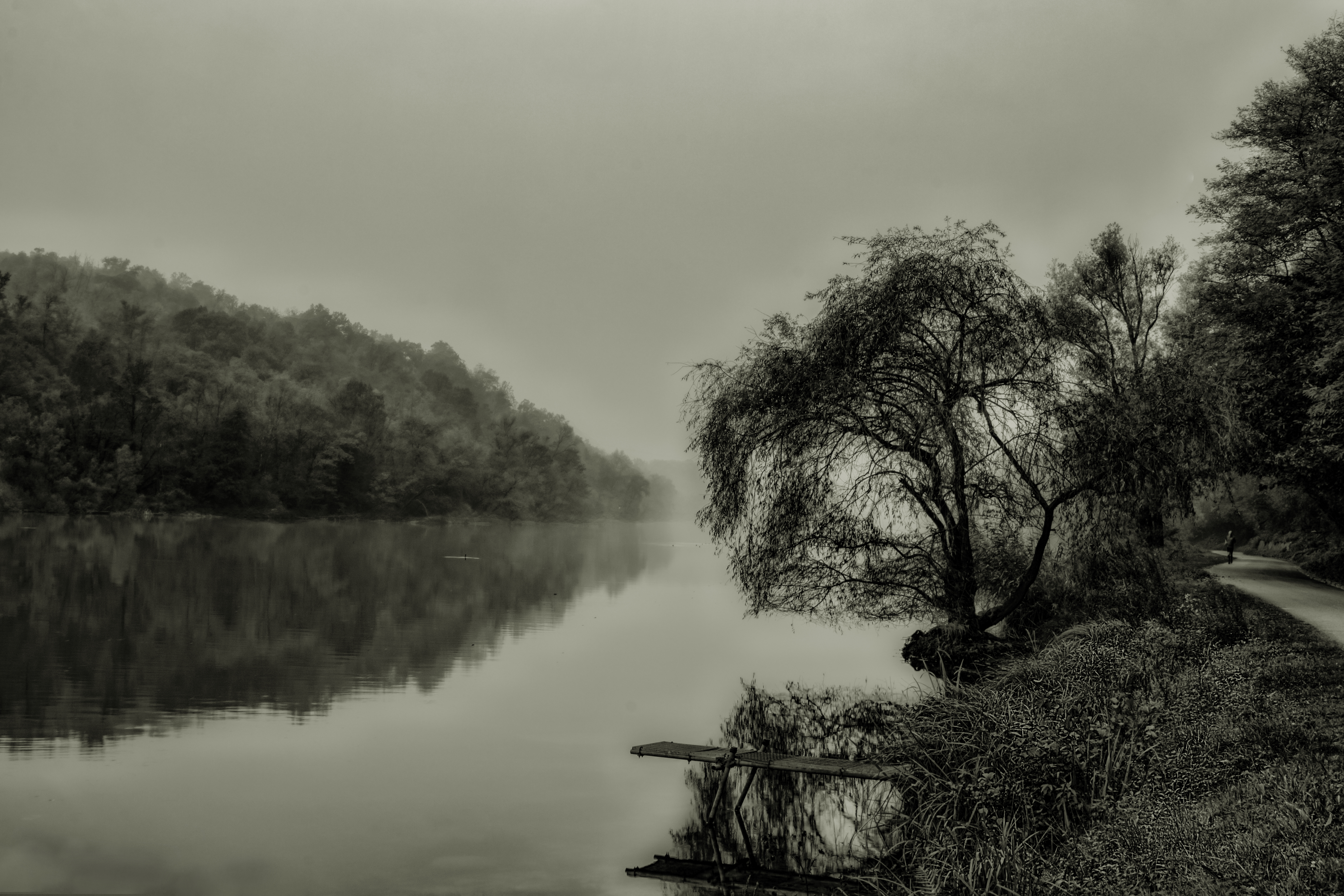
Ticino in Golasecca in the northern part of the Park.

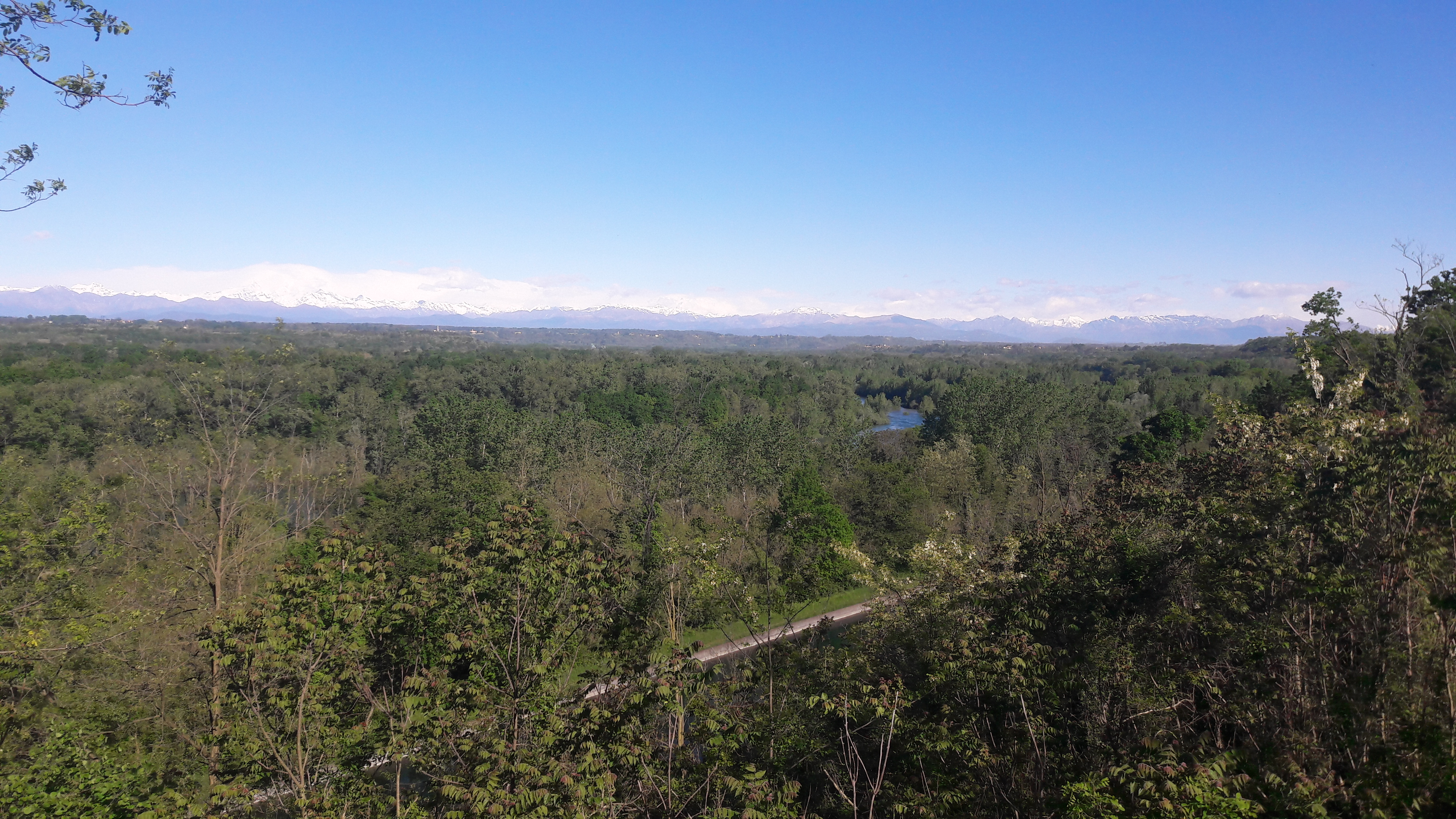
The Ticino valley with the Alps in the background

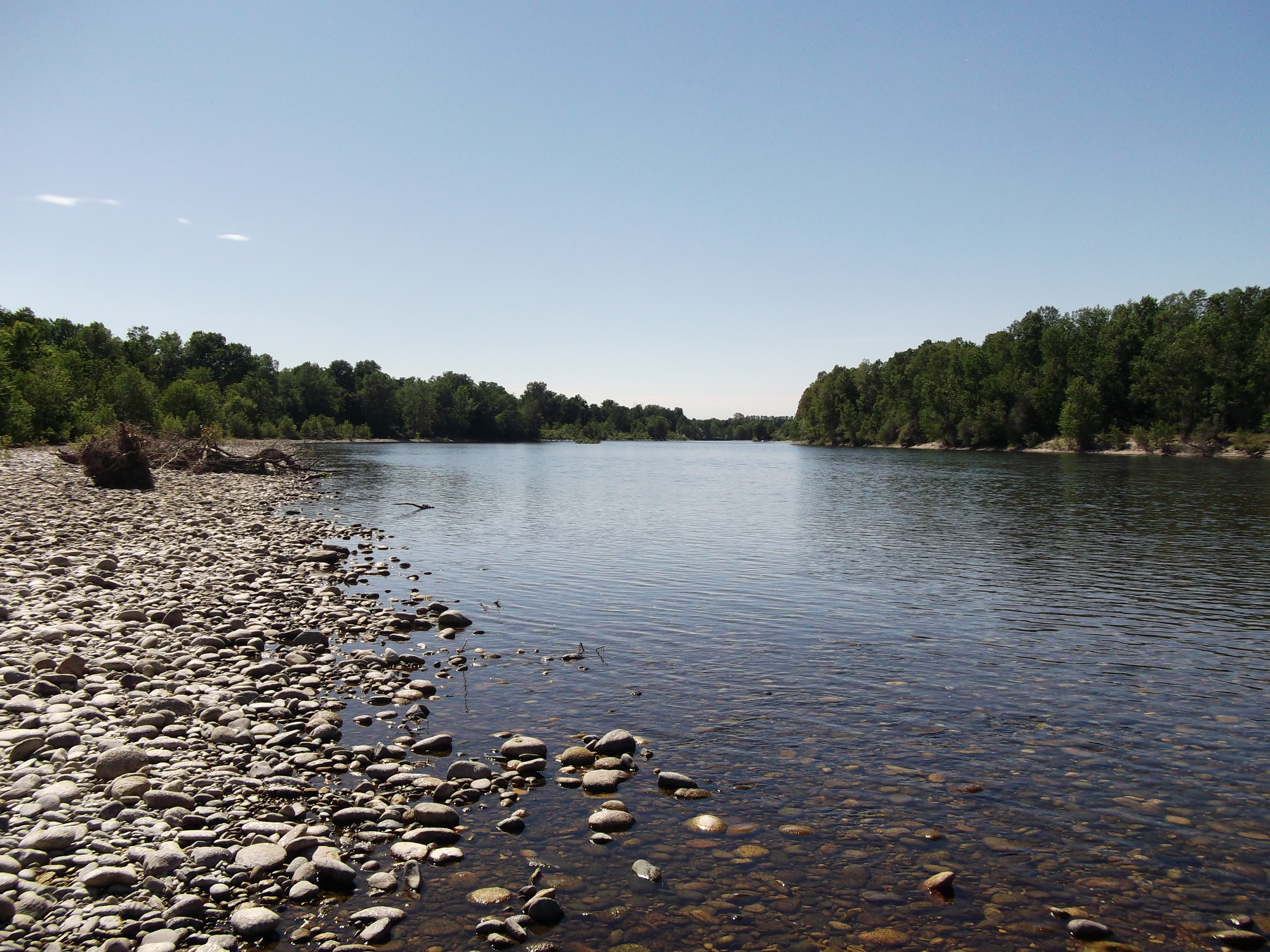
Ticino at Motta Visconti.

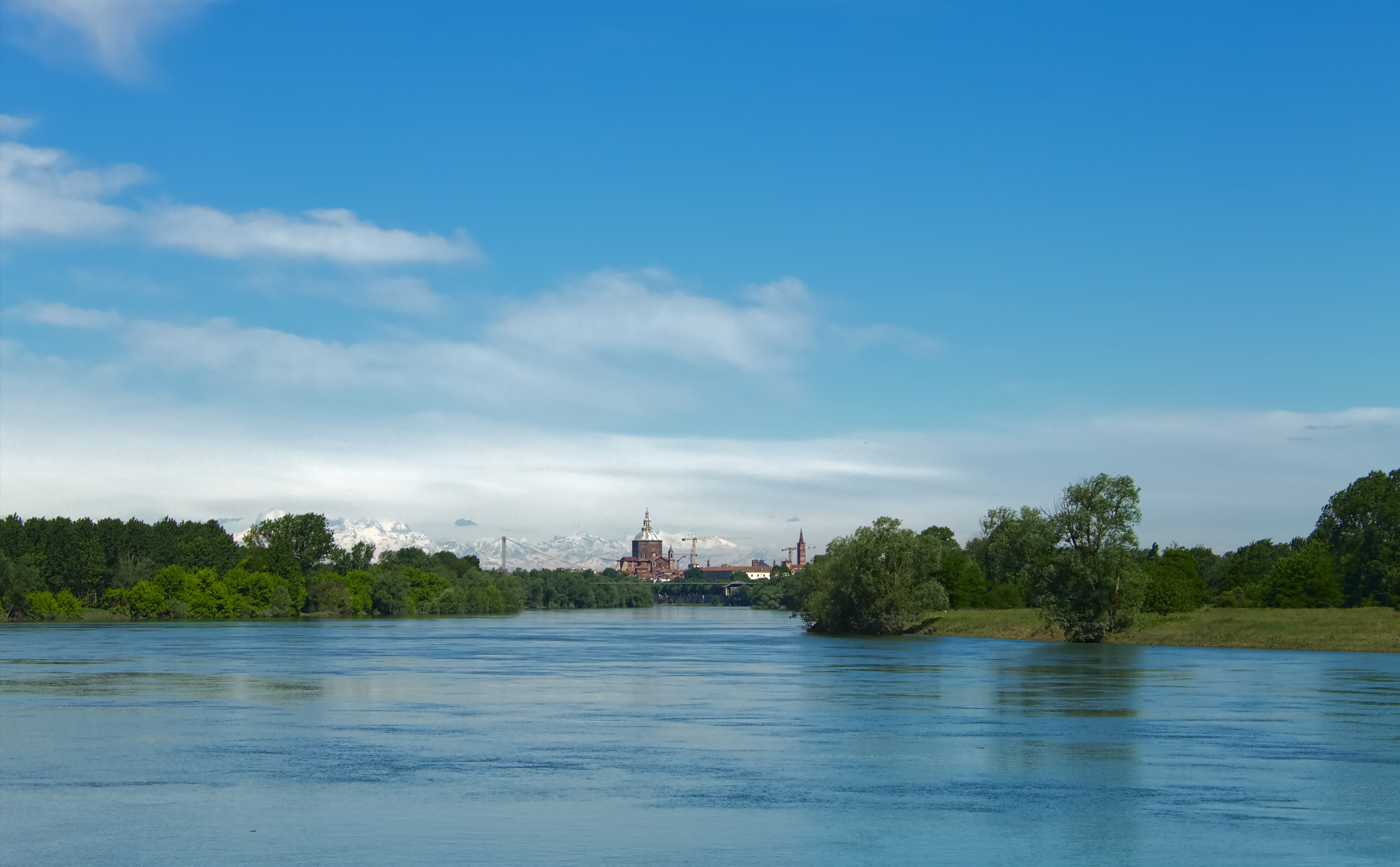
Ticino south of Pavia.

Particularly important is the vegetation that covers the banks of Ticino, continuously renewed by the river with its floods and composed of willows, poplar, alders and, further from the river, elm and oak woods; Ticino is probably the last river in southern Europe where these extraordinary natural phenomena occur, thanks to the possibility of freely wandering in its stream bed. These woods are the undisputed kingdom of the herons, identifiable by visitors for their unmistakable shapes, the largest species are the Grey heron and the Great egret, followed by the Purple Heron, the Black-crowned night heron and the Little egret. During the nidification period many Herons prefer to group in colonies, heronries on the highest branches of willows and poplars; in the Park there are about ten, some of international interest. The presence of herons is also linked to the rich fish fauna that lives in the river and in the waterways that cross the territory of the Park. Among the most valuable species are the Salmo marmoratus (once the king of this river), the Pigo and the Adriatic sturgeon, also the subject of numerous projects aimed at their conservation.

Although water abounds in many ecosystems of the Park, in other areas it is very scarce; this is what happens, paradoxically, on the river bed (characterized by very draining soils) and (in the northernmost part of the park) in the so-called dry meadows and heaths; these environments are home to sparse woods with Austrian oak, Italian oak, common juniper, as well as a flora of great interest that includes spontaneous orchids, the beautiful spring Pulsatilla, with violet petals, as well as carpets of Breckland thymes, Carthusian Pinks, which in the summer are yellow and purple-pink and are habitats of choice for many species of diurnal butterflies. The stony greti are utilized as nesting site by three species of birds whose presence is classified in decline and with an unfavorable state of conservation in all Europe, the Common tern, the Little tern and the Eurasian stone-Curlew, recently returned to reproduce on the Ticino after a long period of absence. The moors of the Park, in particular those surrounding the Milan Malpensa Airport, have some very peculiar characteristics and host a rich fauna, including 230 species of rare and protected birds, such as the European nightjar and the Red-backed Shrike, two rare birds of prey, the Short-toed snake eagle and the Common kestrel, as well as Coenonympha oedippus, the European butterfly at the greatest risk of extinction.

Agriculture is fundamental for the Ticino Park: over a total area of about 90,000 hectares, more than 50,000 are cultivated. This simple data is extremely significant because it helps to understand the enormous impact of agriculture on the landscape, the environment, as well as on the "social" values of the Park, such as culture, history and traditions.

== The woods of the park ==
The woods of the Park are the last and most important forest area of the Po Valley. The forests cover a total of about 20,000 hectares (about 49421 acres) and, for continuity and extension, represent a territorial excellence. This excellence, however, is sometimes opposed to other degraded woods and invaded by exotic weeds; this state of fact derives from the transformations on the territory caused by socio-ecological changeseconomic that from the second half of the 19th century concerned this portion of territory.

The forest types present vary in relation to the geomorphology of the territory of the Ticino Valley. In the northernmost area of the park, between the lake and the area of Somma Lombardo, characterized by small hills and moraines, dominate the chestnut woods on the slopes of the hills, alternating with woods of Pinus sylvestris (typically on top of the hills) English oak and Quercus petraea are also widespread. There are also forms of degradation due to the strong presence of trees coming from North America, such as the Robinia pseudoacacia and the black cherry. Further south, in the area of the High Plain the characteristic background aspect is linked to the Moorland, a term to be understood in a very broad sense, as there are small woods of Pinus sylvestris. Are also widespread degradation aspects linked to the presence of invasive and tenacious exotic trees, which colonize the best soils of the area, or represented by grassland, almost pure molinia. The Moorland of Tornavento (near Milan Malpensa Airport) remains the last edge of the Lombard moors that once covered an extensive portion of the high plain of Lombardy of high naturalistic and cultural value. Finally, there are English oak and Carpinus betulus, in which, however, specimens of an exotic species have infiltrated in recent decades: the northern red oak.

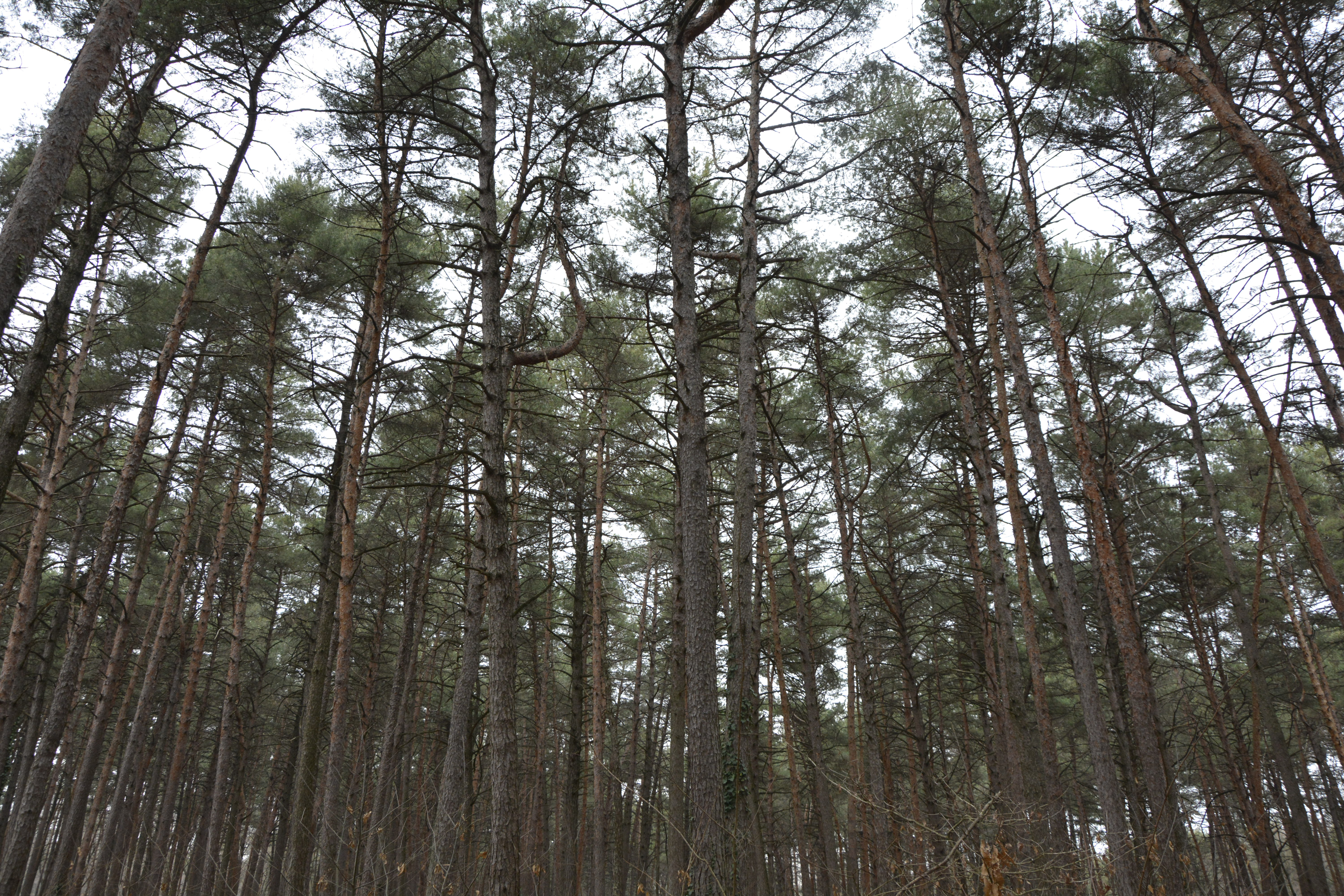
Pinus sylvestris forest in the northern part of the park.

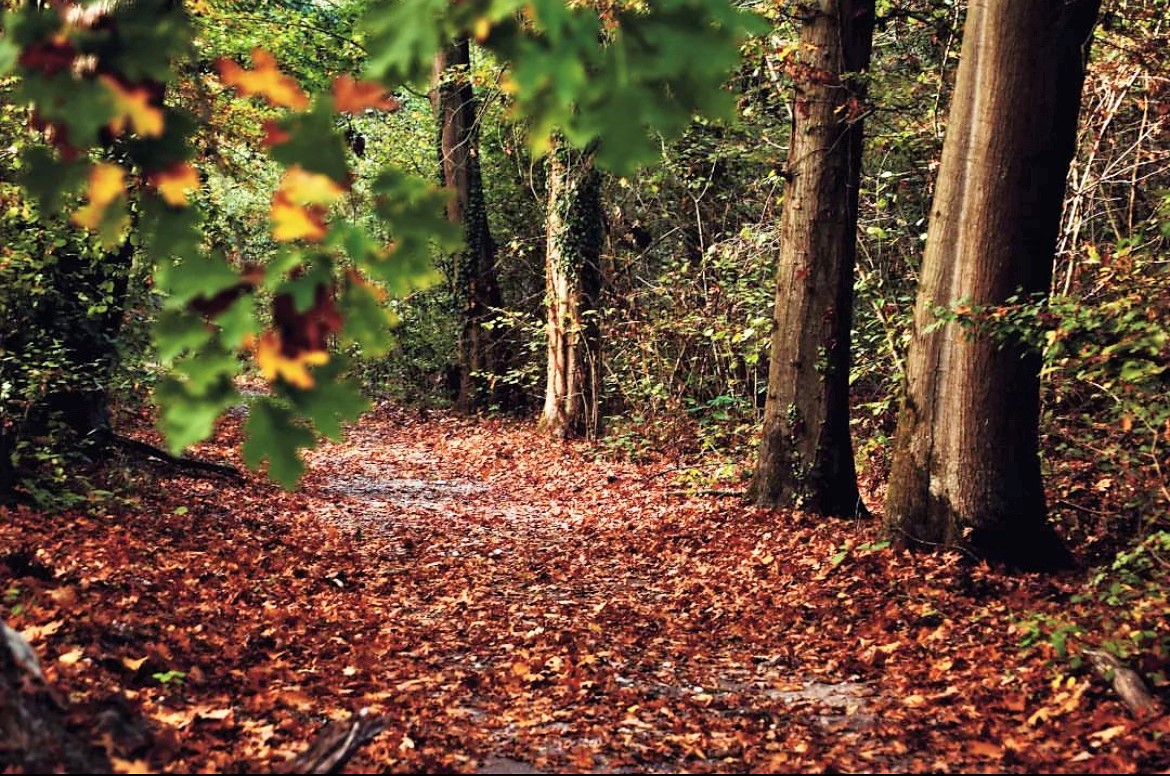
Oak forest in the southern part of the park.

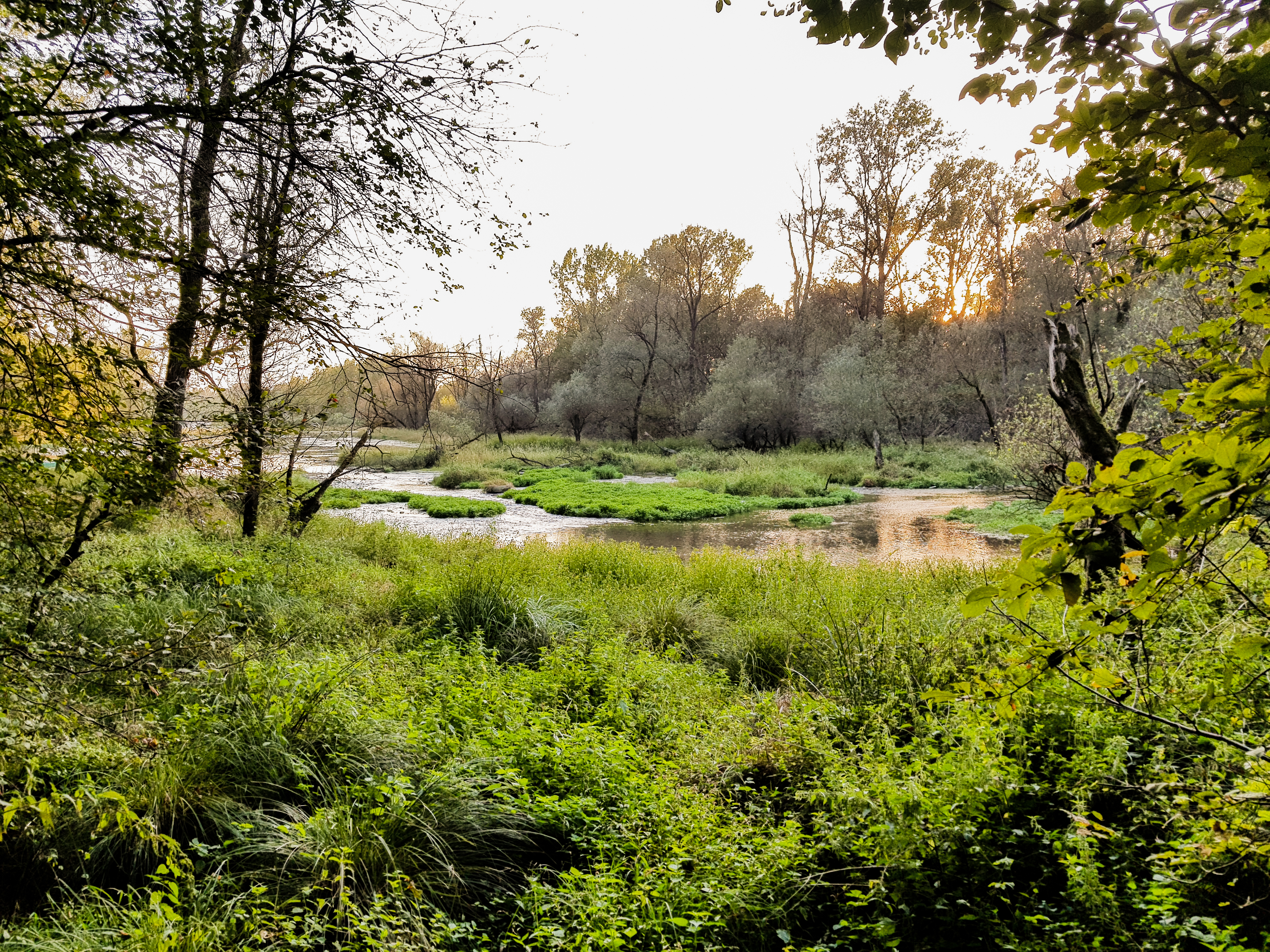
Backwater in Bernate Ticino.

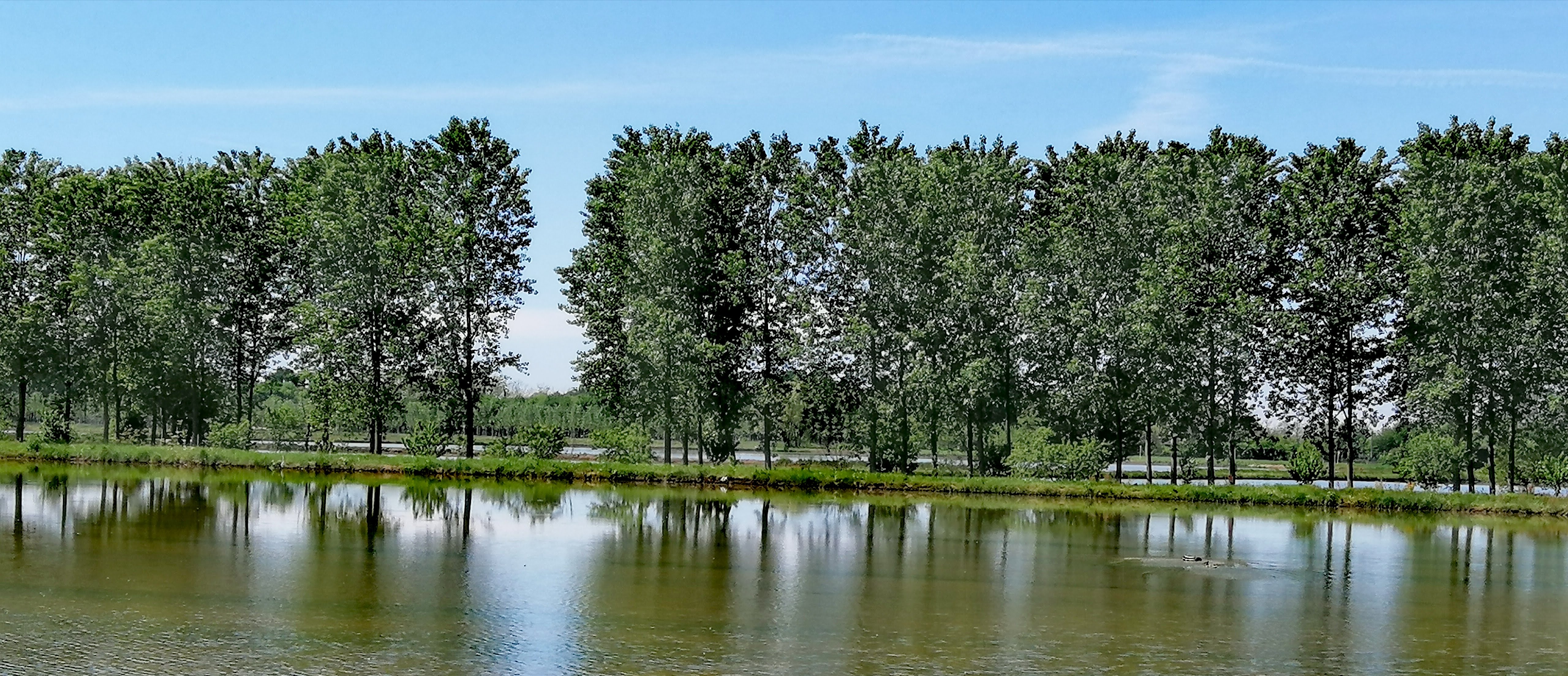
Paddy field in Besate.

Further downstream, from Turbigo to Pavia and the mouth of the Ticino in the Po, there are the largest and best preserved woods of English oak, Carpinus betulus, Populus and field elm, generally equipped with an original kit of herbaceous and shrubby species. In particular, the Strict nature reserve Bosco Siro Negri (owned by the University of Pavia) and Bosco Grande nature reserve still retain the original features of the ancient plain forest as it could have been before the advent of the Romans in the Po Valley. Quite different is the vegetation present along the banks of the river and in the islands that form in its stream bed, where predominates the willow, populus and common hawthorn.

== Fauna ==
The Park, thanks to the extreme diversity of environments, is one of the largest natural areas of the entire Po Valley. Due to the succession of numerous different habitats, the Ticino Valley is able to host a very high diversity of fauna of undisputed value and interest. The fact that many municipalities are part of the Park brings the park to face different needs: on one side nature and on the other man, with his activities. What arises from this challenge are projects, ideas, contrasts and support of fauna, actions that make the Park and its citizens grow. It should be remembered that the area in which the Park is inserted is one of the most urbanized, anthropized and cultivated in Europe, but despite this it hosts a very high fauna diversity, for example its community of Mammals is among the richest and most diverse at European level.

The animal component of the Park is particularly rich and interesting. There are numerous species of birds that nest in the foliage of the trees and in the bushes of the reserve, including tawny owls, eurasian blackcaps, little owls, Eurasian sparrow hawks, woodpeckers, common kingfisher, Cetti's warblers, pheasants, mallards, common moorhens and many others. There are several species of mammals that populate the park, including brown long-eared bats, edible dormouses, squirrels, hares, badgers, foxes, weasels and wild boars.

Since 1997, a project to reintroduce the otter has been implemented, using specimens from England. These were thought to be European otters (Lutra lutra), but the genetic analysis has revealed, in reality, crossings between European otters and Canadian otters. The repopulation project has been suspended, but otters continue to breed in the river’s oxbows.

Since 2017 groups of Italian wolves have been sighted several times in the territory of the park, a presence that, in recent years, has become increasingly present also because wolves, like other animal species, are using the park as an ecological corridium to reach, starting from the northern Apennines, the Alps.

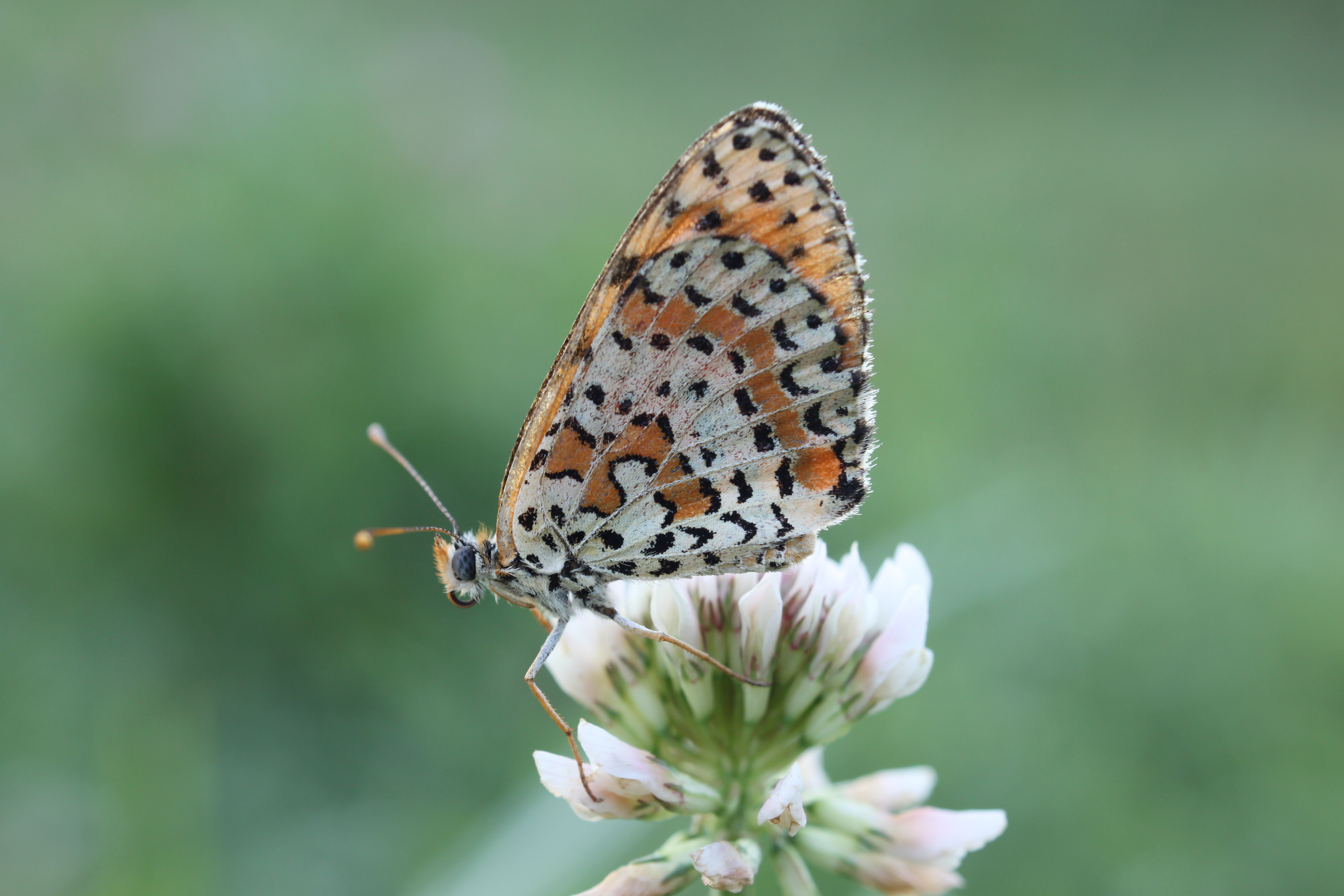
Butterfly photographed inside the Park.

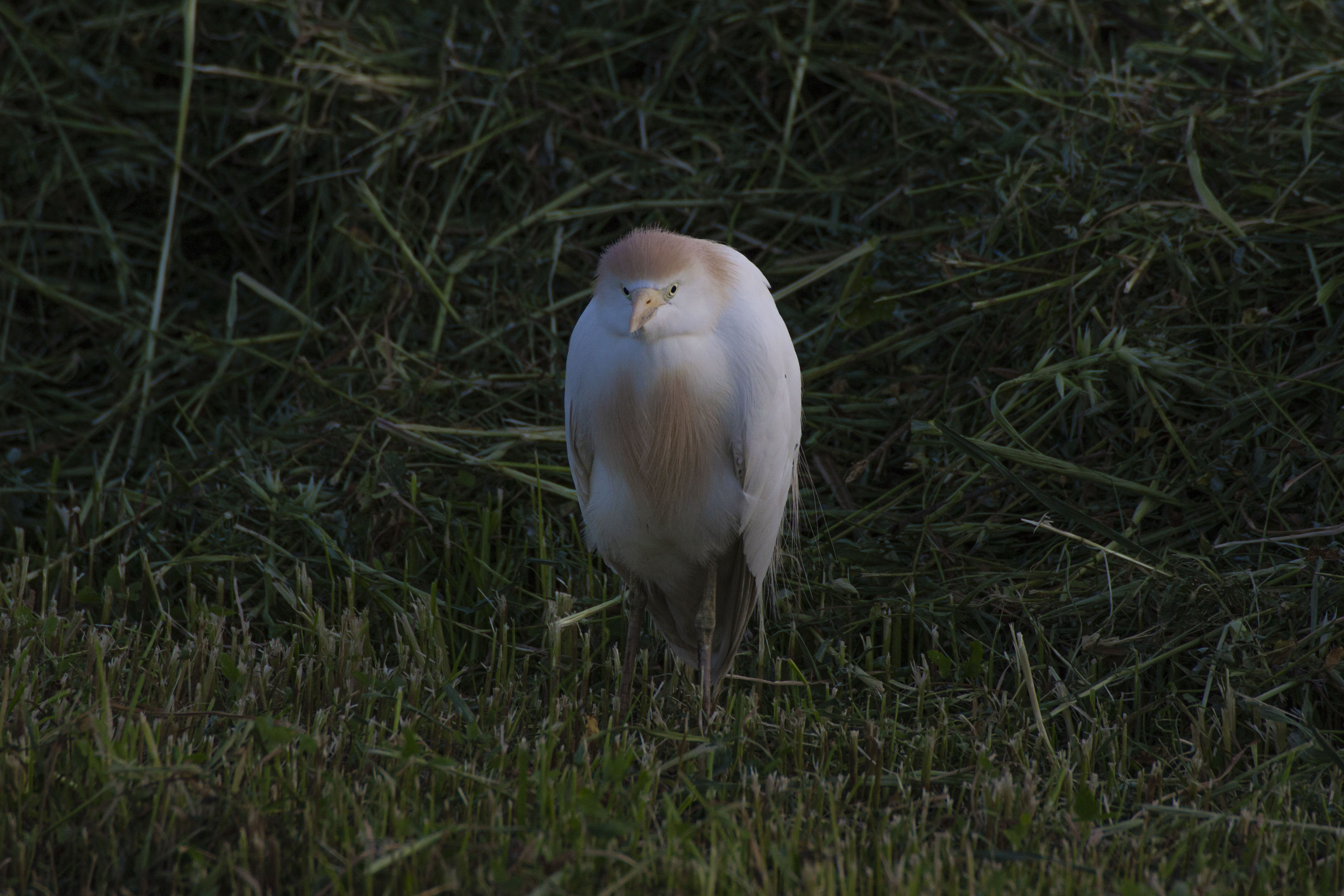
Heron photographed inside the Park.

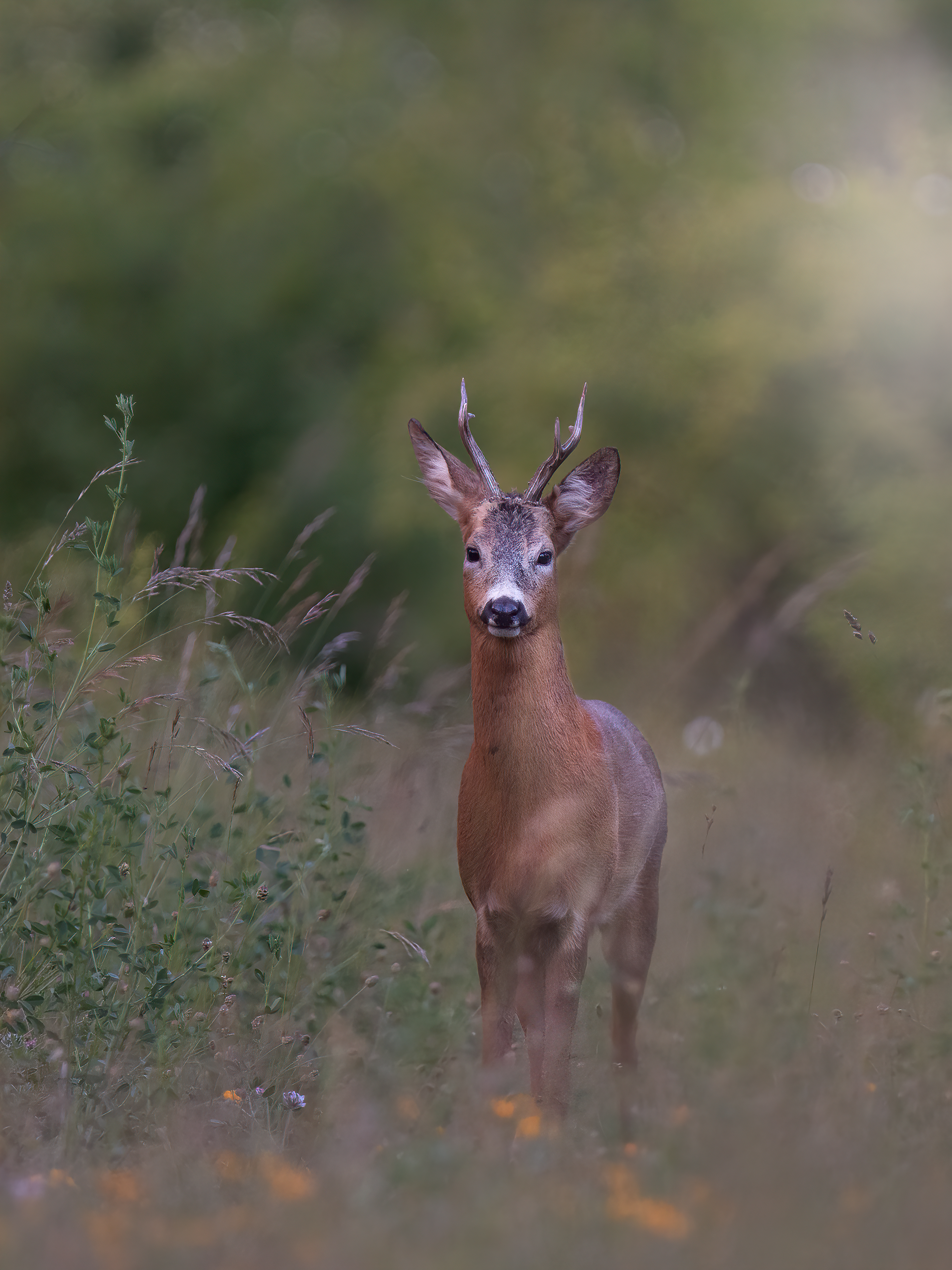
Roe deer.

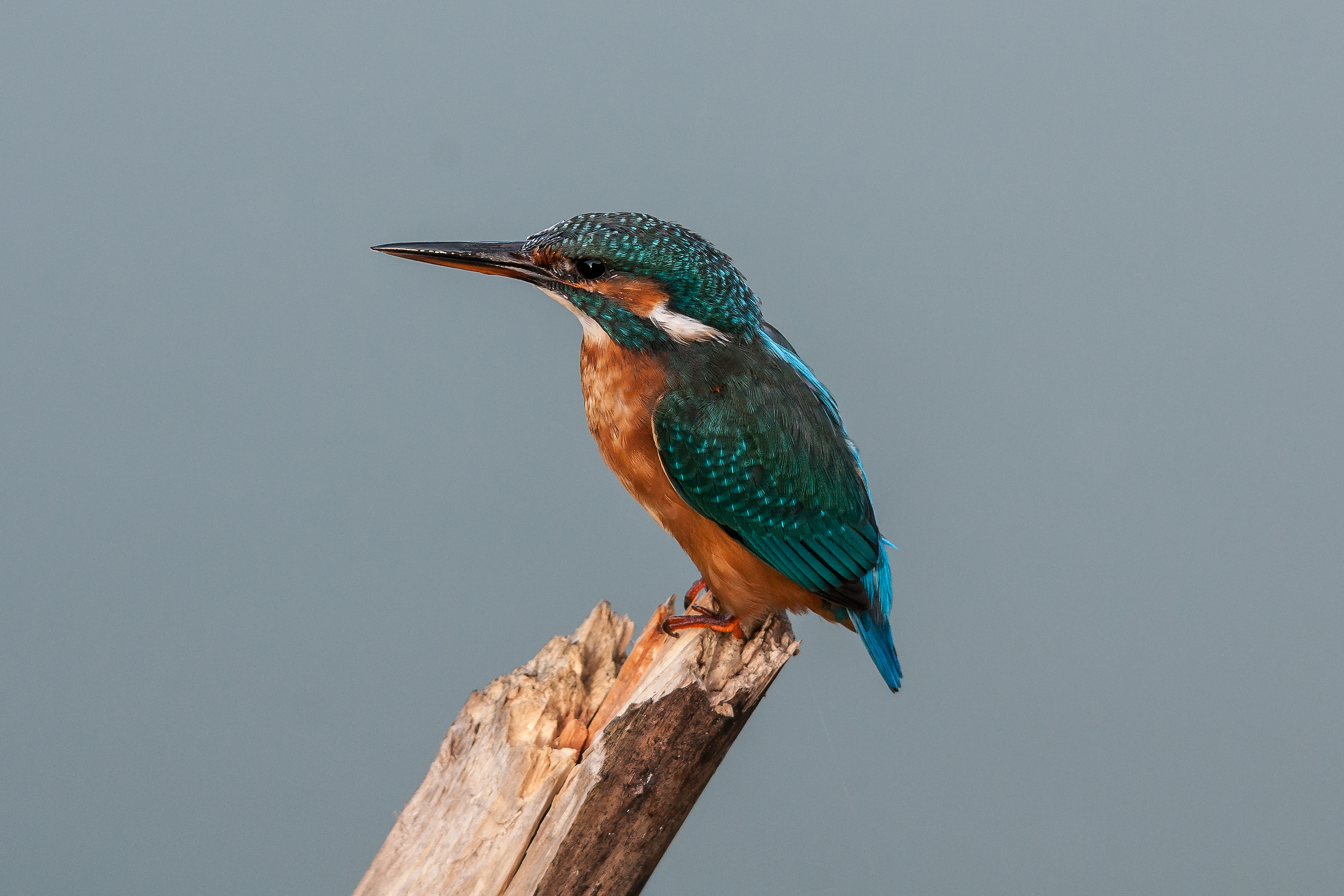
Common kingfisher, symbol of the Park.

Being a river park, the fish fauna can only have a relevance. In the waters of Ticino were counted 47 fish species, of which 17 exotic and 30 native. Among the latter there are Italian endemics that are in a state of decline and that the law requires to protect. Among the native species can be counted: European eels, brook barbels, Italian barbels, Eurasian carp, Lombardy lampreys, Padanian gobies, Italian chub, Italian nases, European graylings, tenchs, European bullheads, northern pikes, Adriatic sturgeons. Among the species coming from abroad are: Wels catfishes, Asps, Pumpkinseeds, Zanders, Rainbow trouts and largemouth basses.

== Main sights ==
At least since the time of the Golasecca culture (9th - 4th century BC), Ticino has also been an important trade route linking Lake Maggiore and the Alps to the rest of Italy. Also for this reason, within the park there are cities, castles, palaces, churches and monasteries of great historical and artistic importance.

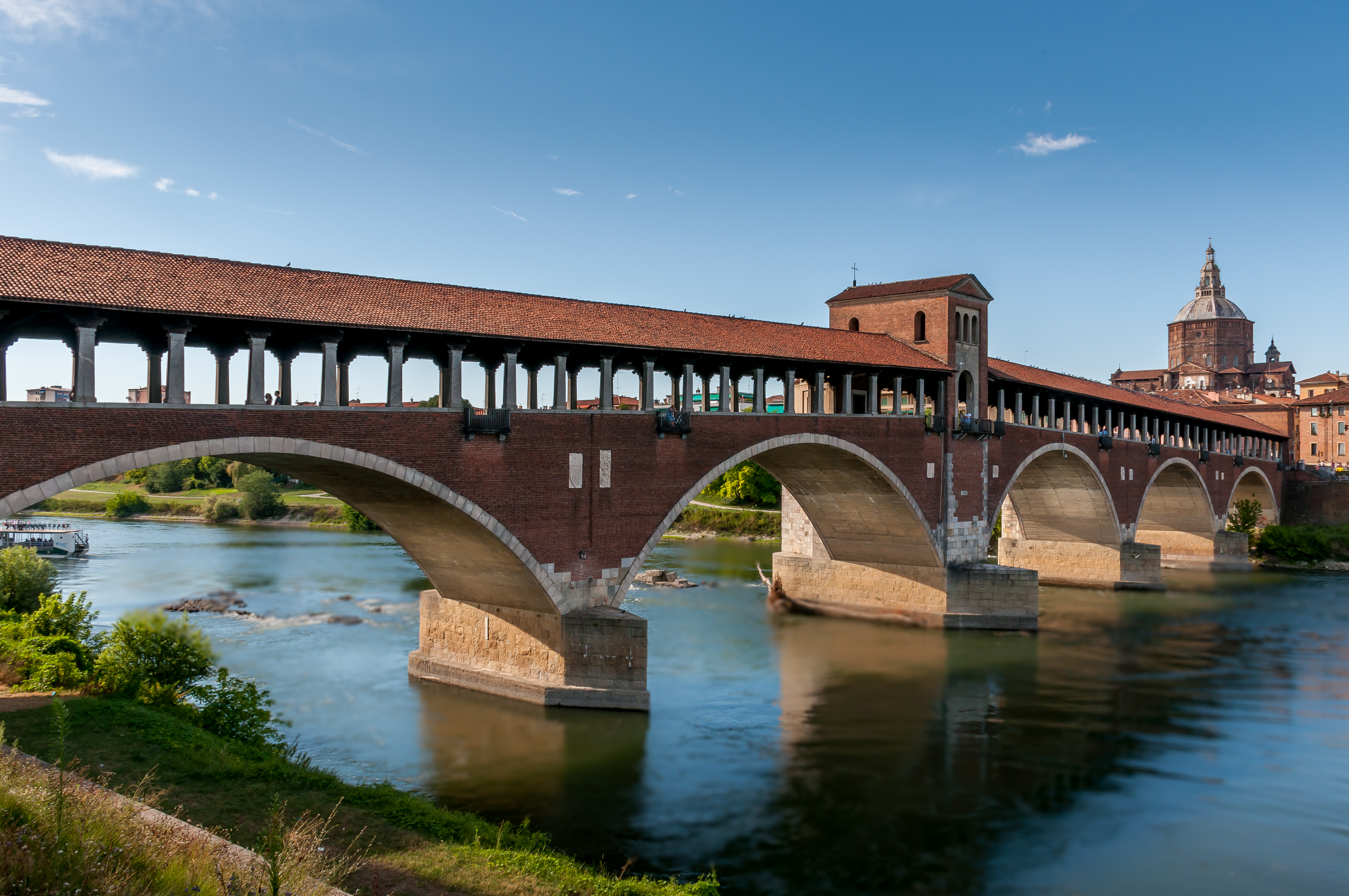
Ponte Coperto in Pavia.

Among the Castles, the main ones are the Visconti Castle of Somma Lombardo, the Visconti Castle of Abbiategrasso, the Visconti-Sforza Castle of Vigevano and the Visconti Castle of Pavia (seat of the court of the Visconti from 1360 to 1413).

Inside the park there is also the Morimondo Abbey, founded in 1134, and the city of Pavia, which was the capital of the Ostrogothic Kingdom from 540 to 553, of the Kingdom of the Lombards from 572 to 774, of the Kingdom of Italy from 774 to 1024 and seat of the Visconti court from 1365 to 1413. Among the many monuments of Pavia we mention only the Romanesque basilicas of San Michele Maggiore (where the kings of Italy were crowned), of San Pietro in Ciel d'Oro (where the relics of St Augustine are preserved) and the Ponte Coperto (Covered Bridge), built in 1354 on the remains of a Roman bridge, destroyed during the bombings of World War II and rebuilt in 1951, which was, until the 19th century, the only brick bridge over the Ticino from Lake Maggiore to its confluence with the Po.
