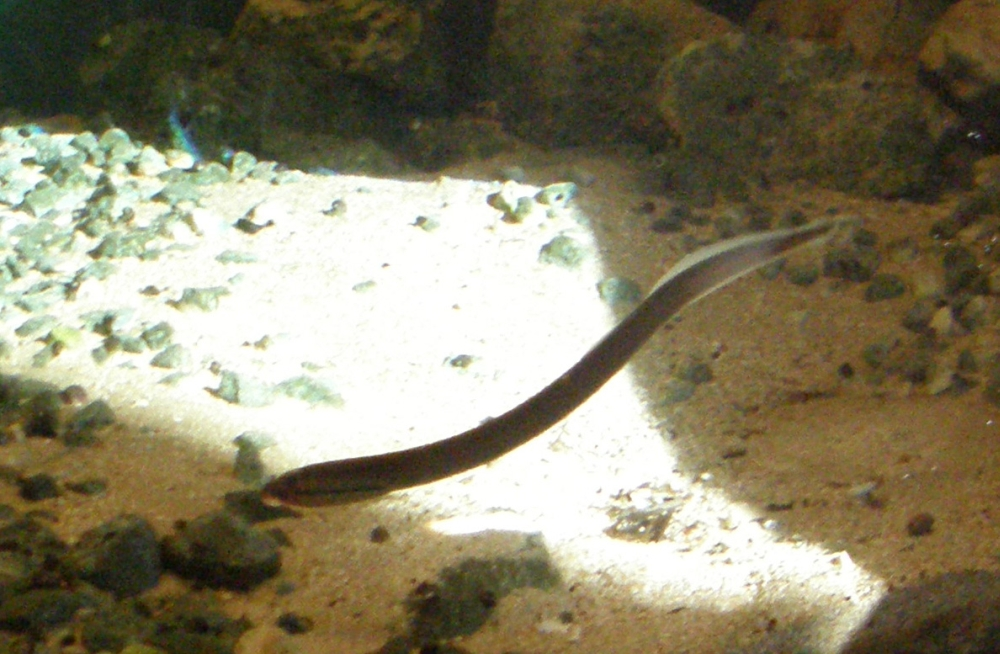

Conservation status
- Near Threatened (IUCN 3.1)

Scientific classification
- Kingdom: Animalia
- Phylum: Chordata
- Infraphylum: Agnatha
- Class: Petromyzontida
- Order: Petromyzontiformes
- Family: Petromyzontidae
- Genus: Lampetra
- Species: L. planeri

Binomial name
- Lampetra planeri (Bloch 1784)

Synonyms
- Petromyzon planeri Bloch 1784; Petromyzon septoeuil Lacepède 1802; Petromyzon niger Lacepède 1802; Petromyzon bicolor Shaw 1804; Petromyzon plumbeus Shaw 1804; ?Petromyzon caecus Couch 1832; Petromyzon anomalum De la Pylaie 1835; Petromyzon fluviatilis f. minor Smitt 1895; Petromyzon fluviatilis f. larvalis Smitt 1895; Ammocoetes lamproyon Römer-Büchner 1927

= Brook lamprey =

Species of jawless fish

The brook lamprey (Lampetra planeri), also known as the European brook lamprey and the western brook lamprey, is a small European lamprey species that exclusively inhabits freshwater environments. The species is related to, but distinct from, the North American western brook lamprey (Lampetra richardsoni).

== Description ==
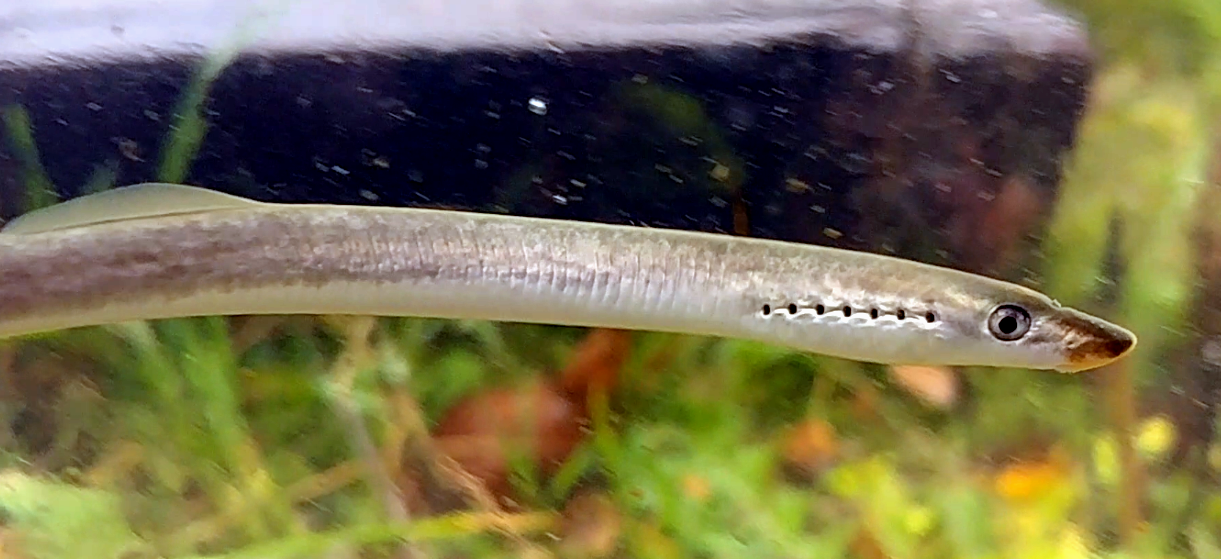
Close-up of a brook lamprey's anterior body.

The brook lamprey is a common, non-parasitic species that is endemic to Europe. Adult brook lampreys measure from 12 to 14 cm (4.7 to 5.5 in). The body is highly elongated and dark blue or greenish above, lightening to yellowish off-white on the sides and pure white on the ventral side. Like all lampreys, these fish lack paired fins and possess a circular sucking disc instead of jaws, which is filled with blunt teeth. They have a single nostril and seven small gill openings on either side behind the eye. The brook lamprey can be told from the closely related river lamprey (Lampetra fluviatilis) by the fact that its two dorsal fins are more closely linked together.

== Distribution ==
Brook lampreys can be found in small streams and larger rivers throughout northern Europe as well as Portugal, southern France, Italy, Sardinia, the Balkans and the upper reaches of the Volga.

== Biology ==
Unlike some species of lamprey, the adults do not migrate to the sea and do not have a parasitic phase. During the spawning time adult brook lampreys do not feed. Brook lampreys spawn in spring and summer in shallow areas of streams and sometimes lakes in gravel close to the soft sediment in which they were previously resident. Both males and females create pits by removing small rocks with their mouths and fanning smaller particles with their tails. The male and female deposit sperm and eggs, simultaneously while intertwined, into the nest. The female can release several thousand eggs, up to 100,000 for some species. Adult brook lamprey spawn in small groups and die soon after spawning.

The eggs hatch within a few days, after which the young larvae bury themselves in soft sediment with only the mouth protruding. The young lampreys are blind filter feeders, feeding on detritus and other organic matter for three to five years before maturing. After spending four years as ammocoetes (Larva), these lampreys metamorphose to adults in the fall and spawn the following spring. This process is complete after the maturation of the gonads. Eyes and suction disk also develop during this time, while the intestinal tract degenerates and loses its function. The full transformation can take up to a year. Thus, these fish develop their teeth precisely when they are no longer able to eat. However, lampreys have been observed gripping stones with their teeth in order to build nests, showing that the teeth do have a function.
