= Fulgenzio Vitman =

Italian clergyman and botanist

Fulgenzio Vitman (1728–1806) was an Italian clergyman and botanist. From 1763 to 1774, he taught botany at the University of Pavia, where in 1773 he founded the University Botanical Garden. In 1774, he developed the Brera Botanical Garden in Milan out of a former Jesuit garden, under the direction of Maria Theresa of Austria.

== Publications ==
- Summa Plantarum volume 1 (1789)
- Summa Plantarum volume 2 (1789)
- Summa Plantarum volume 3 (1789)
- Summa Plantarum volume 4 (1790)
- Summa Plantarum volume 5 (1791)
- Summa Plantarum volume 6 (1792)
