= Orto Botanico dell'Università di Pavia =

Botanic garden and museum in Italy

Orto botanico dell'Università di Pavia
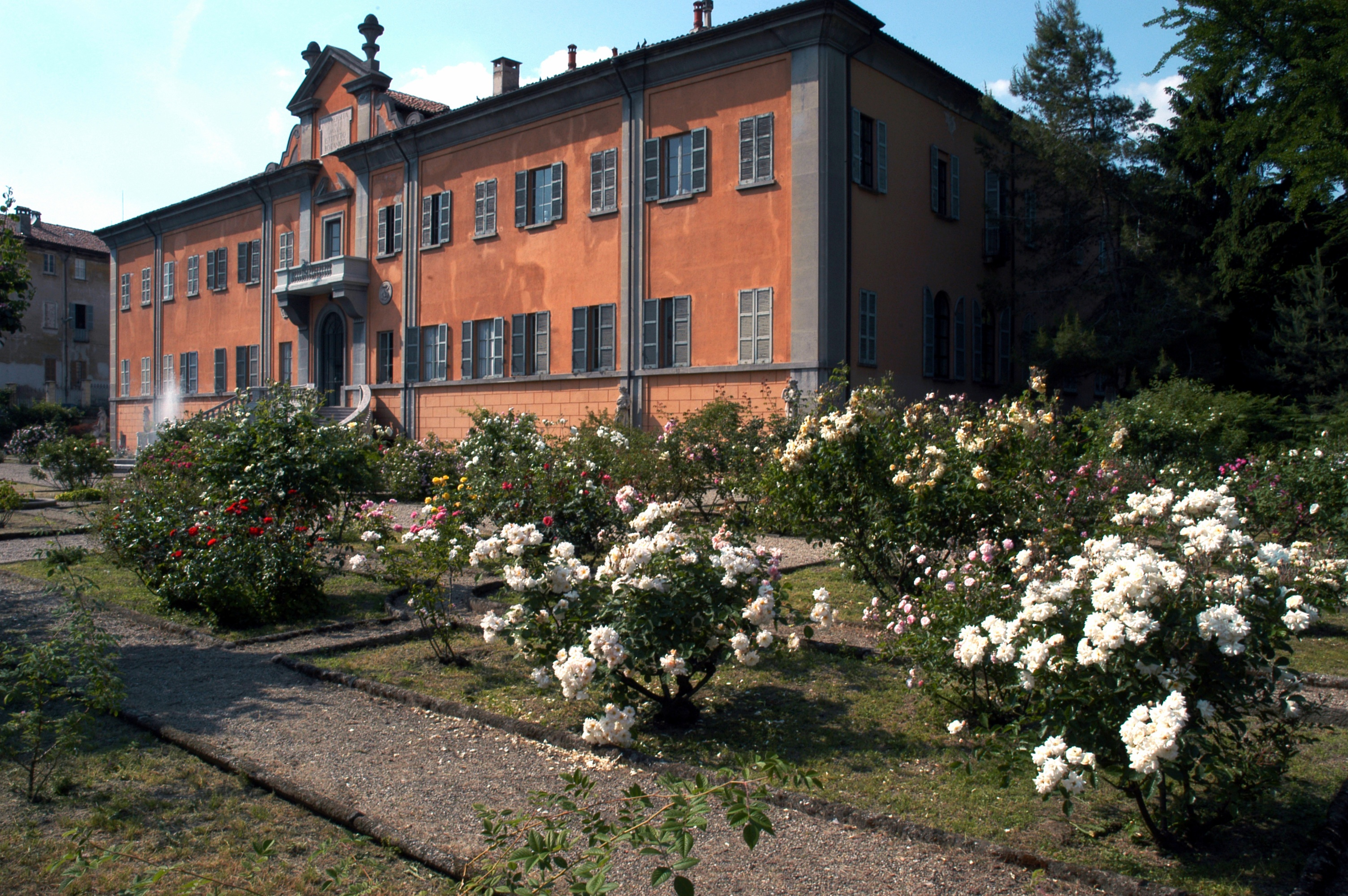
- View of the Orto botanico dell'Università di Pavia.

- Location within Italy
- Type: Botanical garden
- Location: via Sant'Epifanio 14, Pavia, Italy
- Coordinates: 45.18583°N 9.16313°E
- Opened: 1773
- Status: Open year round
- Website: Official website

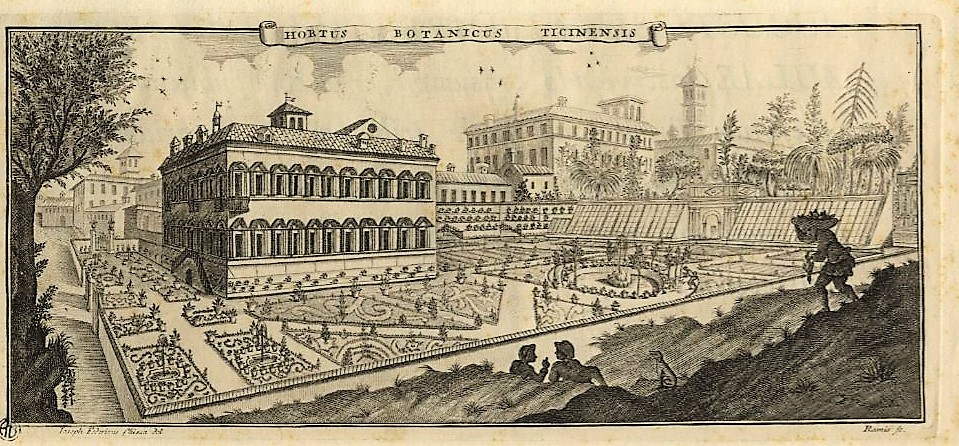
The Orto Botanico in 1780

The Orto Botanico dell'Università di Pavia also known as the Orto Botanico di Pavia (Botanical Garden of Pavia in English), is a botanical garden maintained by the University of Pavia. It is located at Via S. Epifanio, 14, Pavia, Italy, and is open to the public on weekends. The botanical garden covers an area of about two hectares and has approximately two thousand different species of plants, which are organised in sections. The current director is Francesco Sartori.The Botanical Garden stands in the place where the church of Saint Epiphanius was located, of which it preserves the cloister of the 15th century.

== History ==
The garden was started in 1773 as a successor to Pavia's earlier Orto dei Semplici (established 1558). Fulgenzio Vitman, a Vallombrosan monk, established the first chair of botany at the University of Pavia and started the design of the Pavia Botanical Garden. In 1772, Count Karl Joseph von Firmian, Plenipotentiary of the Habsburgs for Lombardy, recommended the use of the Padua Botanical Garden as an example. In 1773 the botanists Valentino Brusati and Giovanni Battista Borsieri undertook the works for the construction of the present seat. In 1774 the Chemistry Laboratory was established.

By 1775 the garden was in use, with its first wooden greenhouses constructed in 1776 designed by Giuseppe Piermarini, then modified by Luigi Canonica in 1815. In 1777, when the buildings of the Garden were already similar to the current one, he took over the direction of the naturalist Giovanni Antonio Scopoli (1723-1788) Thanks to which the Botanical Garden of Pavia reached a structure comparable to that of the most famous Italian botanical gardens.

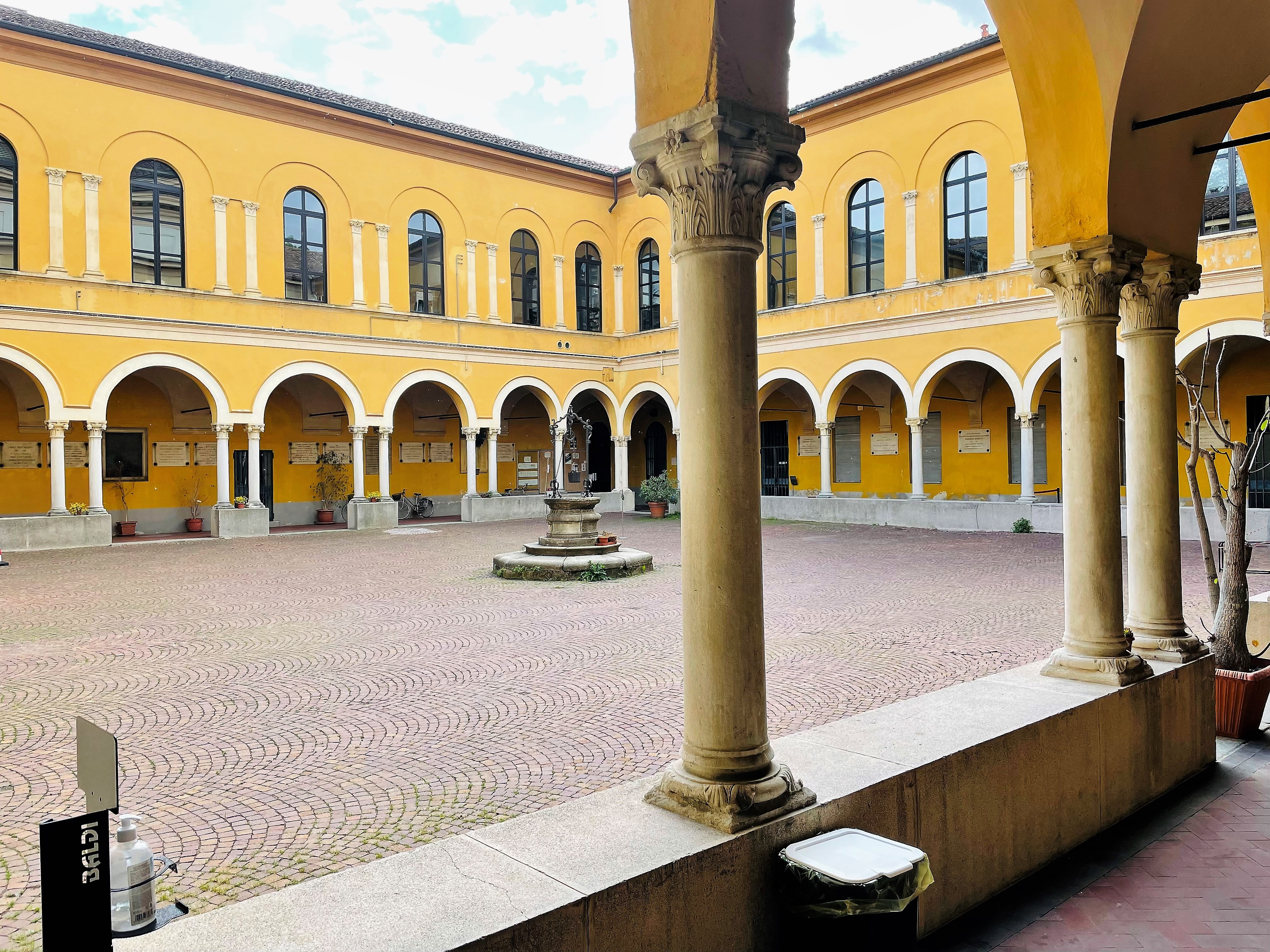
The cloister of the church of Sant'Epifanio (1460-1480), incorporated in the eighteenth-century palace of the Botanical Garden.

Nocca Domenico organized and expanded the garden 1797–1826, adding collections to exchange seeds and plants, and building a masonry greenhouse to replace the earlier wooden structures. The garden was extensively damaged in World War II, after which its greenhouses were relocated to the main building's south side.

From 1964 to 1982 Ruggero Tomaselli was the director, who undertook the cultivation and study of species from every continent and made the tropical greenhouse. Since 2017 the Botanical Garden of Pavia is part of the University of Pavia Museum System (SMA).

== Collections ==
Today the garden contains about 2000 taxa, with major collections of aquatic plants, conifers, hosta, hydrangea, magnolia, medical plants, peat bog plants, and a rose garden. Its four greenhouses are as follows:

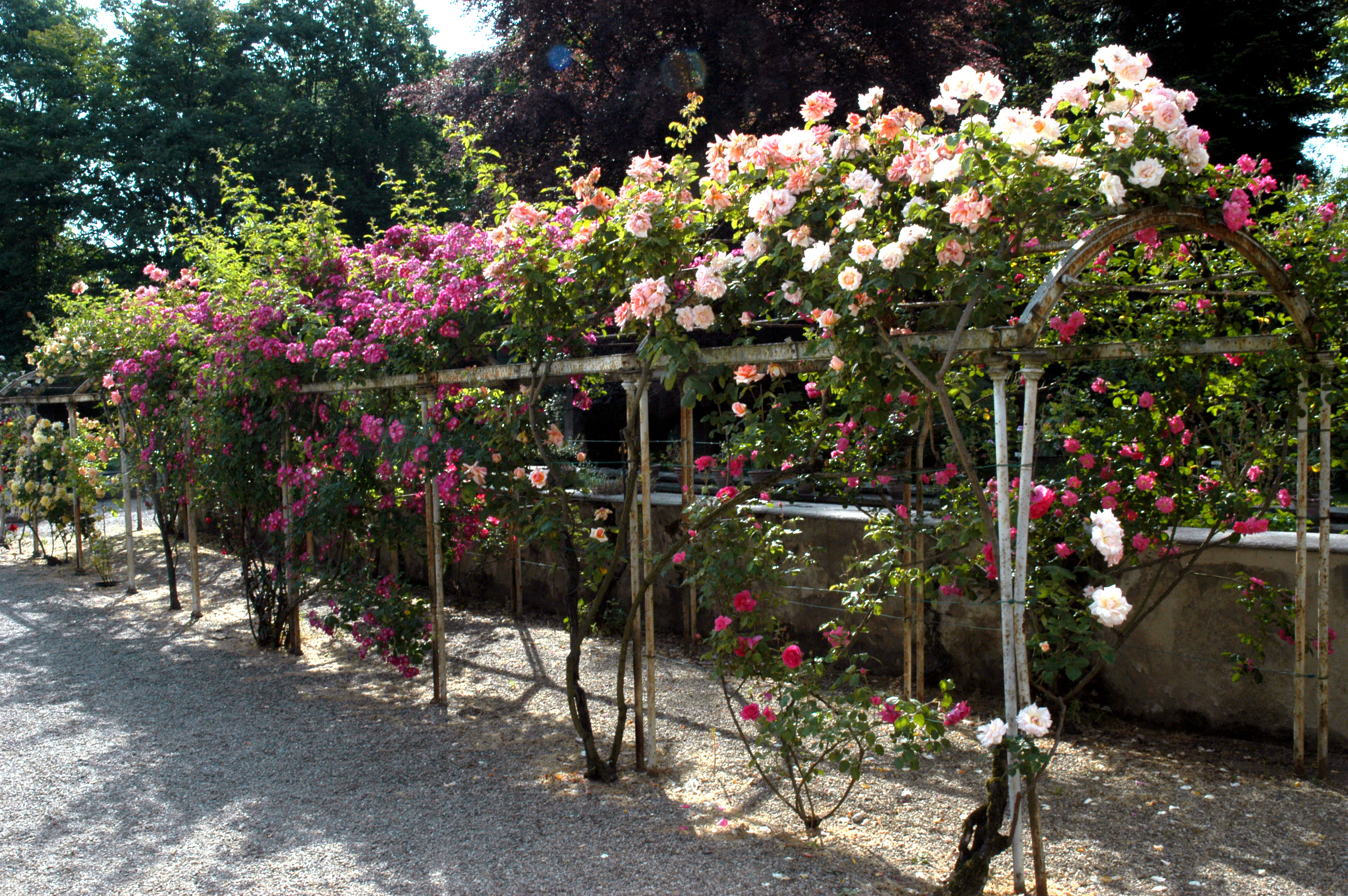
One of the pergolas of the rose garden.

- Arid greenhouse (Serre Scopoliane, originally dating to 1776, 171 feet (52 m) long by 23 feet (7.0 m) wide) — a good collection of succulents (more than 500 species) with notable specimens of Ariocarpus furfuraceus, Ariocarpus trigonus, Copiapoa cinerea, Lophophora williamsii var. Caespitosa, Obregonia denegrii, and Welwitschia mirabilis, and many species of Frailea, Lobivia, and Rebutia, as well as 30 species of Lithops.
- Orchidaceae greenhouse — orchids from Central America and North America, plus ferns, Araceae, Bromeliaceae, and Tillandsia.
- Temperate greenhouse — plants of economic importance, fruit, etc.
- Tropical greenhouse (built 1974) — Araceae, Arecaceae, Euphorbiaceae, Liliaceae, Marantaceae, and Pteridofitas.

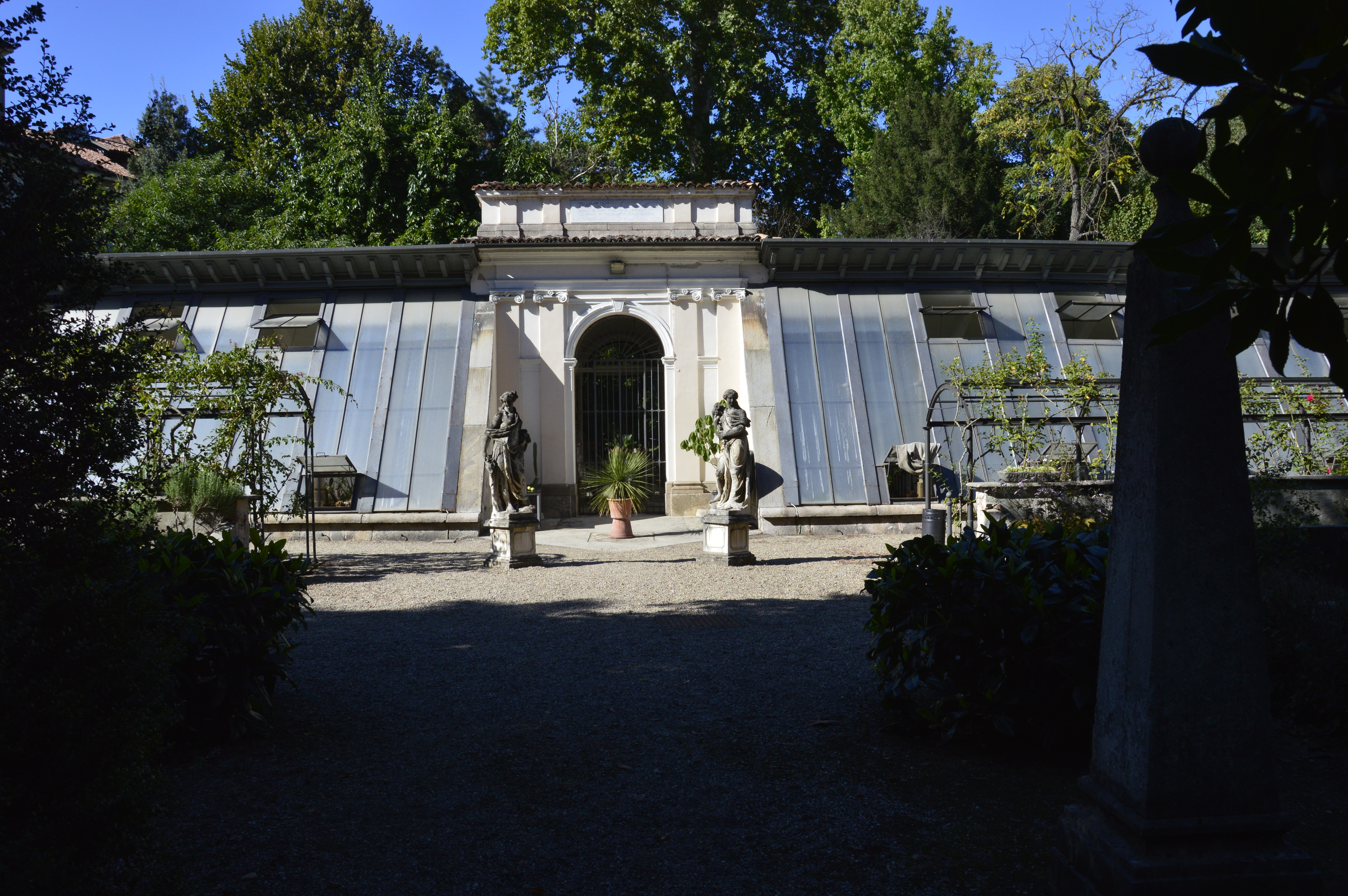
The greenhouses designed by Giuseppe Piermarini, 1776, and then modified by Luigi Canonica in 1815.

- The cultivation of Tea.The director Giovanni Briosi, around the end of the nineteenth century, experimented with the cultivation of tea, but only around 1920 Gino Pollacci, managed to acclimatize the plant to the cold of northern Italy without needing any cover during the winter, thus giving rise to a new variety: Camellia sinensis (L.) Kuntze 'Ticinensis' (= C. sinensis f. ticinensis (Pollacci & Gallotti) Ardenghi), of "Pavese tea". For this discovery, in 1939, he received an award from the Ministry of the Interior. The flowering of Pavese tea takes place in May and October.

== Herbaria ==
The premises of the Botanical Garden of Pavia host the Herbarium of the University of Pavia (acronym PAV), currently managed by the Department of Earth Sciences and Environment (DSTA). The oldest specimens date back to Fulgenzio Vitman (1763-1785); Vitman’s herbarium has now been digitized, some of these were made, according to a technique very original for the time, integrating the dried plant with watercolor drawings, depicting mainly organs difficult to dry (e.g. succulent leaves, fruits).

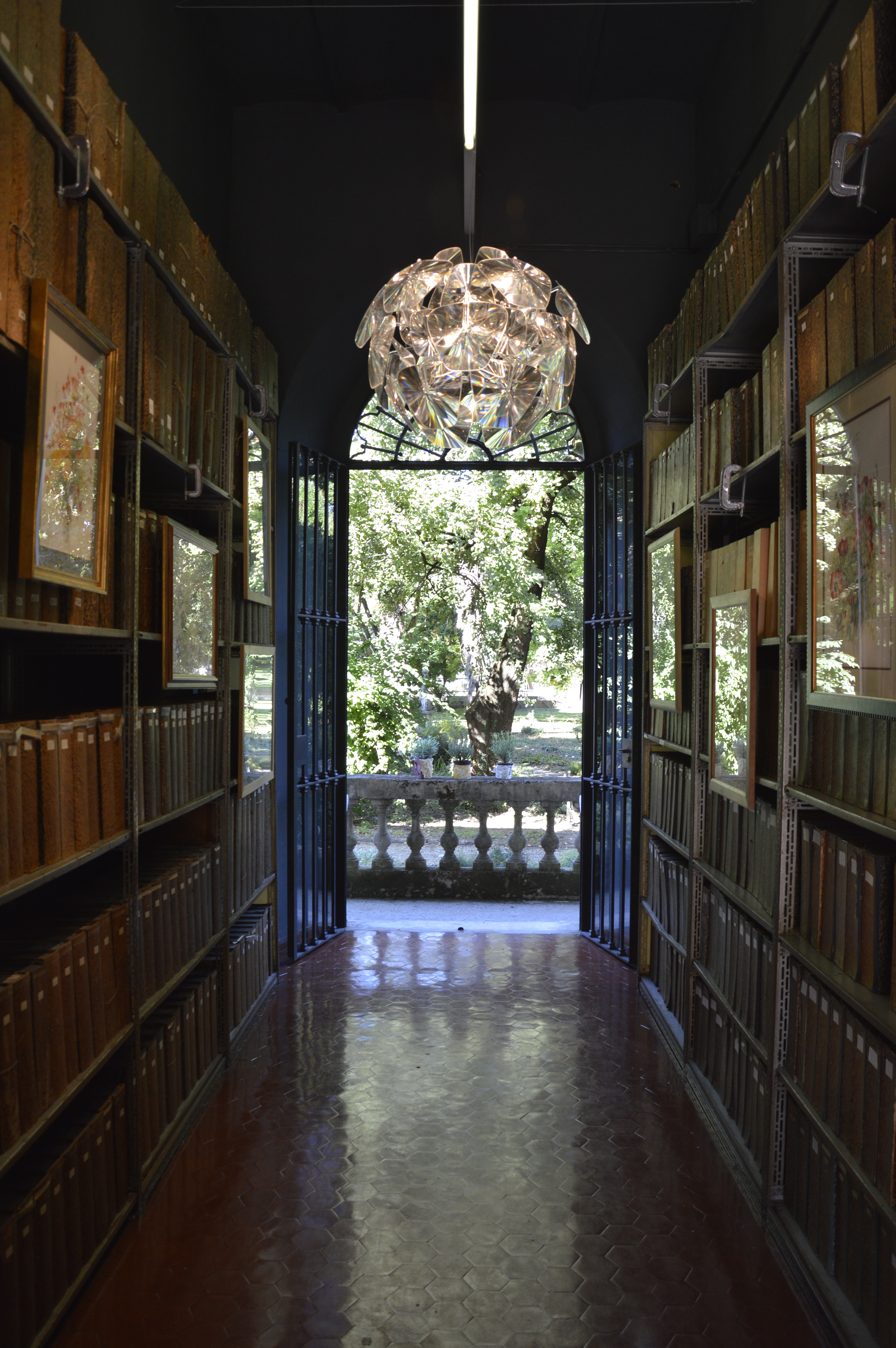
The library of the Botanical Garden where the herbariums are kept

Partly from a dried portion and partly from the collection of herbaria of dried plants continued until the direction of Giuseppe Moretti (1826-1853). From Santo Garovaglio (1853-1882) were found the herbariums of Giuseppe Comolli and Guglielmo Gasparrini; these herbariums were considered so important to be kept separately from the general collection. The establishment of a Lombard herbarium and a general herbarium dates back to the direction of Raffaele Ciferri (1942-1964), with the intention of bringing together all the material present. Some herbariums, for example that of Adriano Fiori, have partially retained their autonomous form. The main collections include mycological and lichen collections. Each sample shall bear a label bearing the place and date of collection of the material and the signature of those who have catalogued it.

== Strict nature reserve Bosco Siro Negri ==
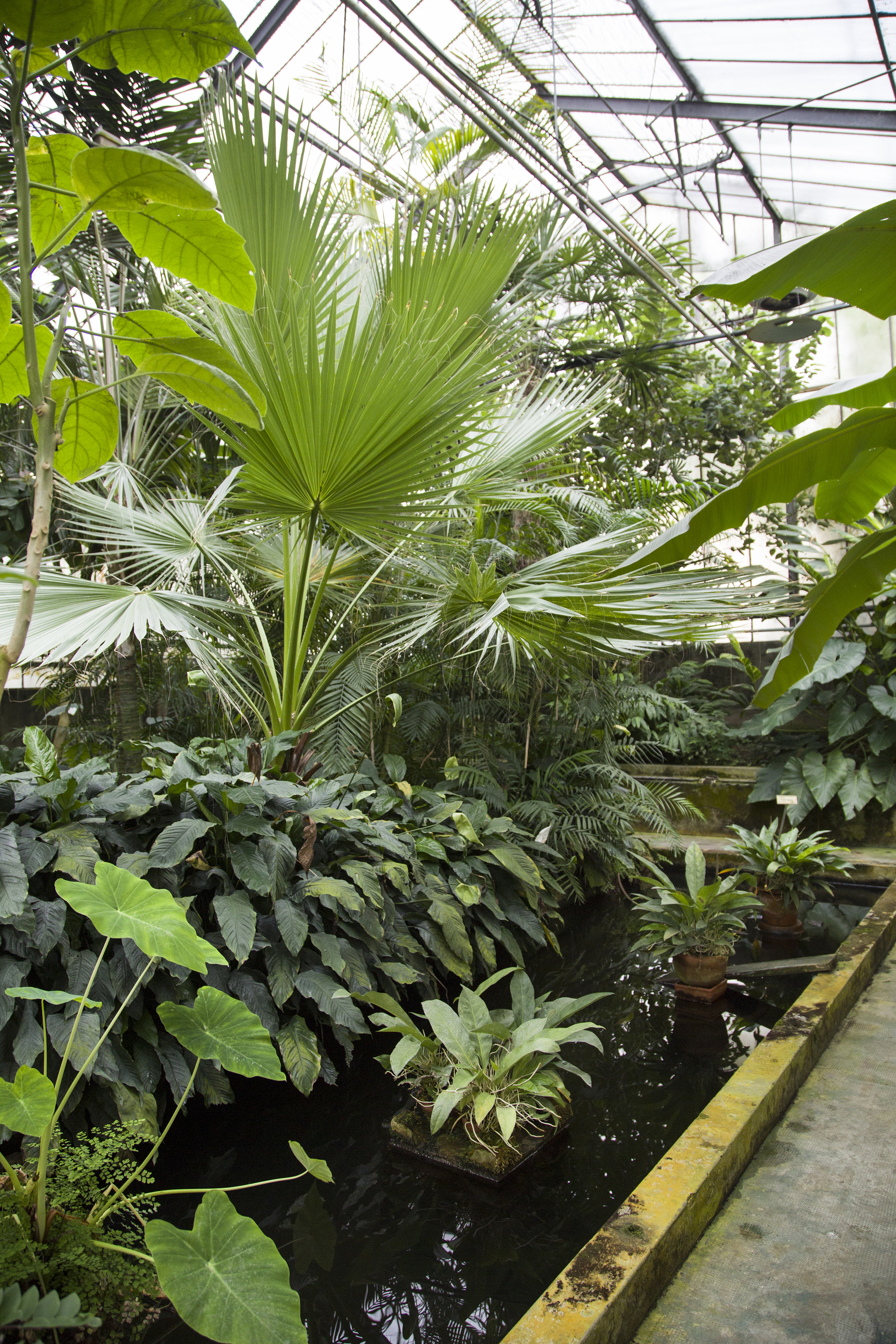
The interior of the tropical greenhouse

Since 1973, the Institute has managed the Strict nature reserve Bosco Siro Negri, a protected natural area owned by the University of Pavia. The reserve was donated to the University of Pavia in 1967 by Giuseppe Negri, a timber trader and great lover of nature. The reserve is located near Ticino, a few kilometers from the center of Pavia. The forest shows us the original state of nature before the arrival of the Romans, before the human settlement.The reserve covers an area of 34 hectares, corresponding to about 84 hectares and is one of the rare examples of forest vegetation of the Po Valley with characteristics of good naturalness, of very low anthropic disturbance and represents the faithful testimony of an ancient botanical natural heritage. The reserve is covered by a thick vegetation, mainly composed of oaks (Quercus robur).

== Chronology ==
- 1520- Probably the opening year of a collection of plants that it calls “Orto dei semplici” (“ Garden of remedies”) near the Leonardo Leggi’s residence, reader of “Ordinary Practice Medical”. This collection changed location many times over the years.
- 1773- Fulgenzio Witman, became reader in 1763, and was able to transfer the Garden to the place where it is now. The new site was set like a model from the earlier garden of Padova.
- 1776- During Valentino Brusati’s direction, greenhouses were built, by the architect Giuseppe Piermarini.
- 1777-1778- Giovanni Antonio Scopoli became director and gives to the Botanical Garden a structure similar to the current one. This fact can be checked by a publication that is in one of the most important Scolopi’s work, Deliciae Florae et Faunae Insubricae, in 1786. Besides, under the direction of Scolopi were established a lot of connections with European Botanicals.

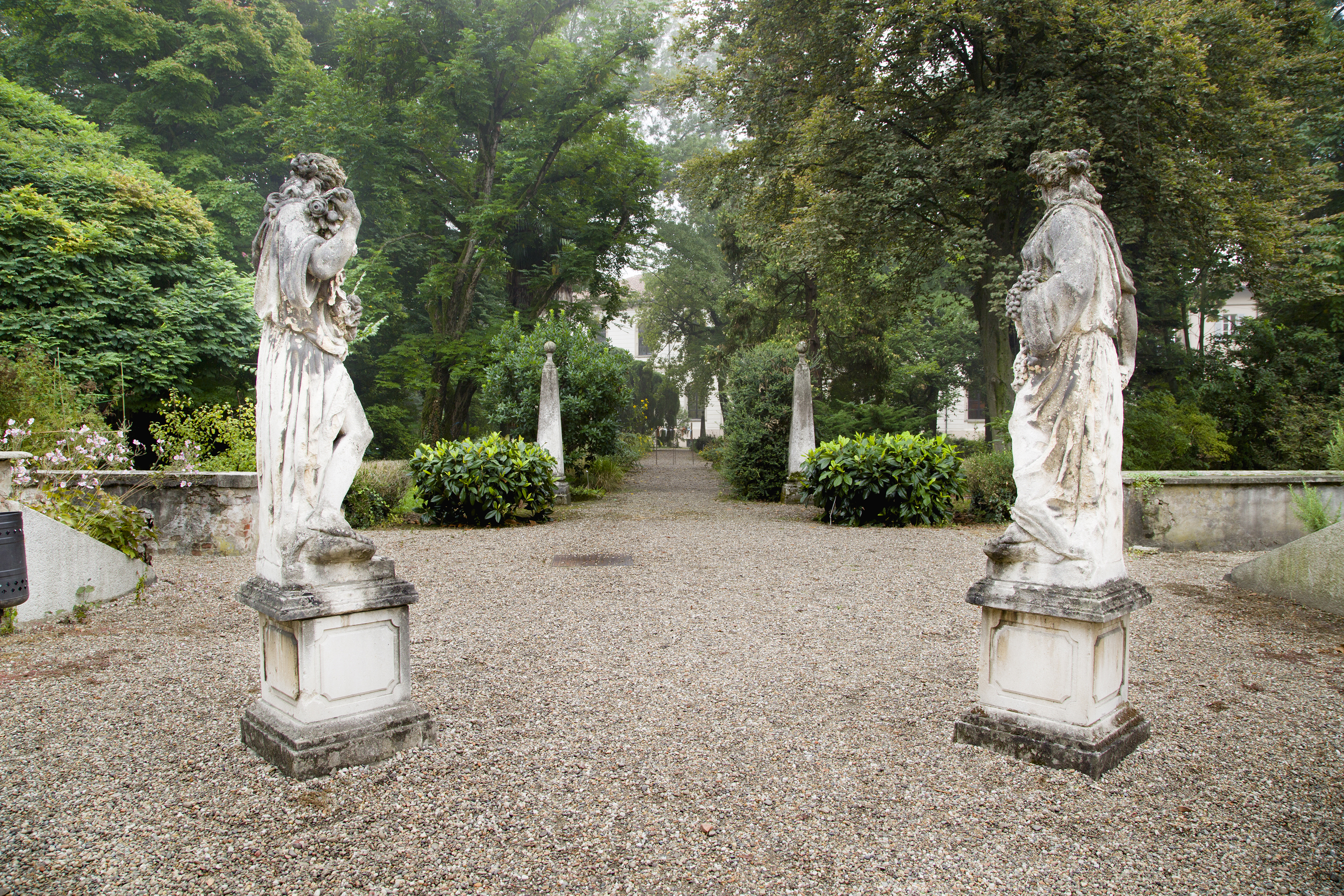
One of the garden paths

- 1797-1826- Domenico Nocca became director and started again a lot of works of organization for the Garden: he ordered to Luigi Canonica to restructure the Scolopi’s greenhouse and enriched the collection with exchange of seeds and plants.
- 1871- Under the direction of Santo Garovaglio a Laboratory Crittogamico was started, to study plant diseases caused by parasites.
- 1883-1919- The Garden was directed by Giovanni Briosi: he instituted the first hot greenhouses.
- 1943- The director Raffaele Ciferri, took away some part of the greenhouse because of war; but then he edified the side monumental of the institute and the rose’s garden that still today it is a great feature of the Garden.
- 1964-1982- Ruggiero Tomaselli was the director; he increased the collection by importations of original plants from their origin places, where he did some searches; was edified the first tropical greenhouse in 1974.
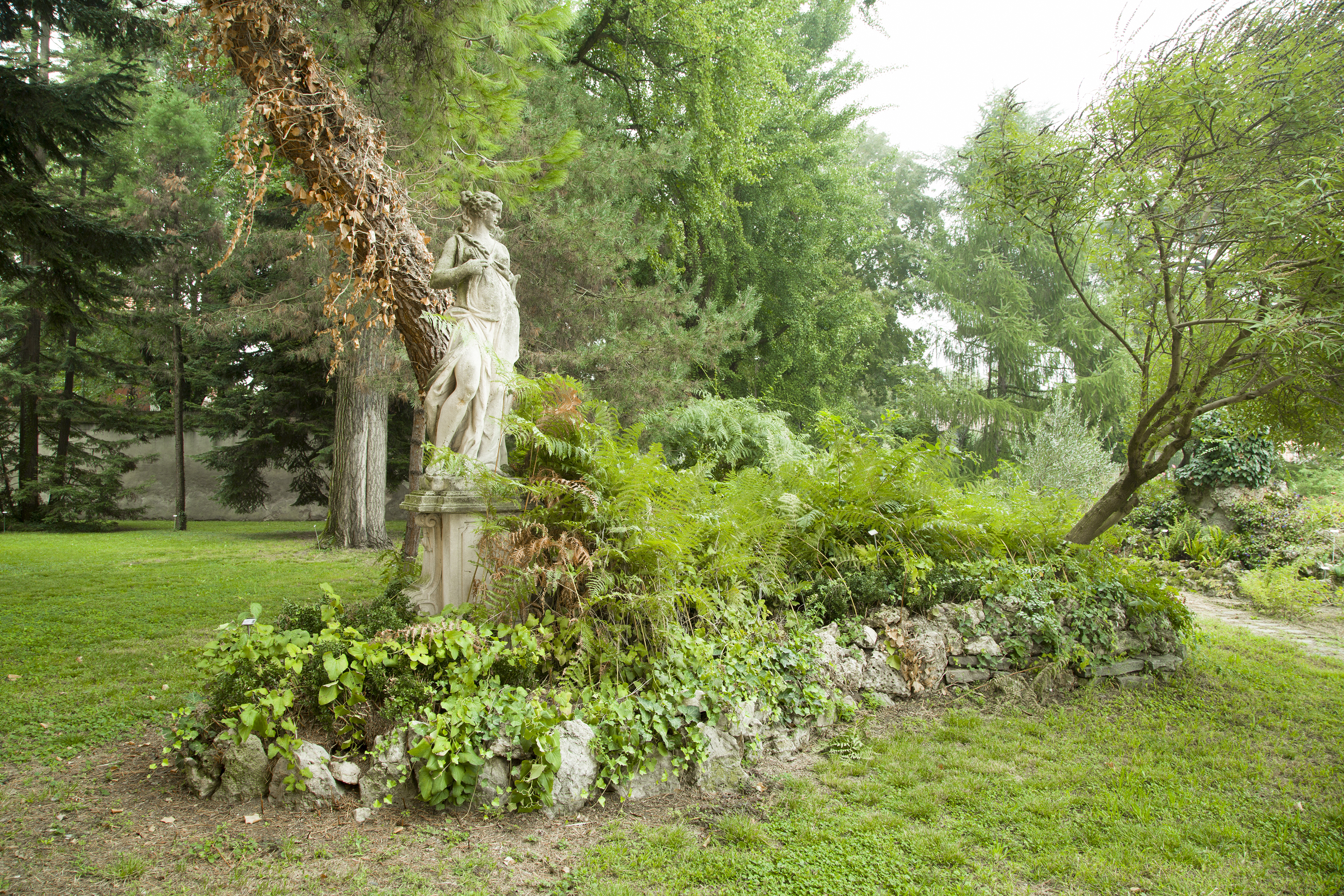
  The park.
- 1997- The Botanical Vegetable Pot was part of the Department of Ecology of Territory and Environment. In the same year Alberto Balduzzi became director and made a new collection of medicinal plants.
- 2005- The Seed Bank of the University of Pavia was set up to preserve seeds of native plants that are threatened from the Lombardy region.

== See also ==
- List of botanical gardens in Italy

== Bibliography ==
- Orto Botanico dell'Università di Pavia
- Horti entry (Italian)
- Ardenghi Nicola M. G., Bracco Francesco, Cauzzi Paolo, Gianoli Luca W., Orsenigo Simone, Ravasio Adriano e Rossi Graziano, Le collezioni botaniche, in Almum Studium Papiense. Storia dell’Università di Pavia. Volume 3. Il Ventesimo secolo. Tomo II, Milano, Cisalpino, 2020, ISBN 978-88-205-1126-5.
- Georg Kohlmaier, Barna von Sartory, Houses of Glass: A Nineteenth-Century Building Type, MIT Press, 1986, page 362. ISBN 0-262-61070-1.
- A. Pirola, "Orto Botanico di Pavia: dal sistema linneano alle collezioni tematiche", Convegno di studio Le reti locali degli Orti Botanici: il caso della Lombardia, Bergamo, 3 – October 2002.
- G. Pollaci, "L’Orto Botanico di Pavia dalla fondazione al 1942", Ticinum, 6: 20–23, 1959.
