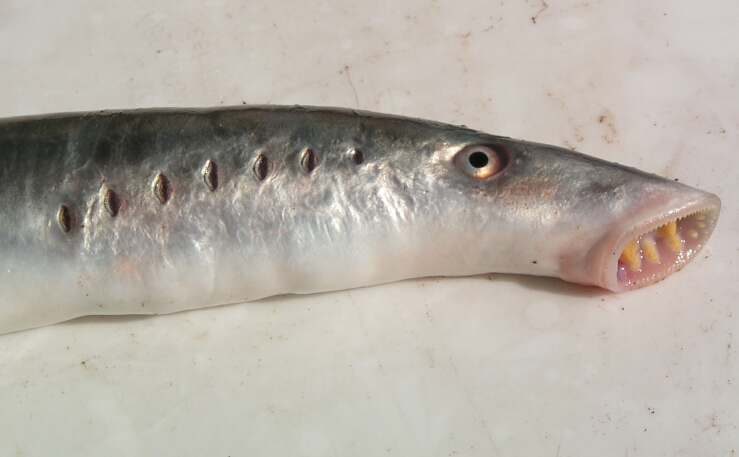
- A European River Lamprey (L. fluviatilis)

Scientific classification
- Kingdom: Animalia
- Phylum: Chordata
- Infraphylum: Agnatha
- Class: Petromyzontida
- Order: Petromyzontiformes
- Family: Petromyzontidae
- Genus: Lampetra; Bonnaterre 1788

Type species
- Petromyzon planeri Bloch 1784

Synonyms
- Lampetra (Okkelbergia) Creaser & Hubbs 1922; Okkelbergia (Creaser & Hubbs 1922)

= Lampetra =

Genus of jawless fishes

Lampetra is a genus of lampreys in the family Petromyzontidae.

Phylogenetic studies indicate that this genus as presently defined is polyphyletic, with species of this genus from western North America forming a clade that forms the sister group to Lethenteron, Eudontomyzon, and Lampetra sensu stricto (eastern North American and European species).

== Species ==
The currently recognized species in this genus are:

- Lampetra aepyptera (C. C. Abbott, 1860) (Least brook lamprey)
- Lampetra alavariensis Mateus, Alves, Quintella & P. R. Almeida, 2013 (Portuguese lamprey)
- Lampetra auremensis Mateus, Alves, Quintella & P. R. Almeida, 2013 (Qurem lamprey)
- Lampetra ayresii (Günther, 1870) (Western river lamprey)
- Lampetra fluviatilis (Linnaeus, 1758) (European river lamprey)
- Lampetra hubbsi (Vladykov & Kott 1976) (Kern brook lamprey)
- Lampetra lanceolata Kux & H. M. Steiner, 1972 (Turkish brook lamprey)
- Lampetra lusitanica Mateus, Alves, Quintella & P. R. Almeida, 2013
- Lampetra pacifica Vladykov 1973 (Pacific brook lamprey)
- Lampetra planeri (Bloch, 1784) (European brook lamprey)
- Lampetra richardsoni (Vladykov & Follett, 1965) (Western brook lamprey)
- Lampetra soljani Tutman, Freyhof, Dulčić, Glamuzina & Geiger, 2017
- Lampetra zanandreai Vladykov, 1955 (Po brook lamprey)
