= Lampetra lanceolata =

Conservation status
- Critically Endangered (IUCN 3.1)

Scientific classification
- Kingdom: Animalia
- Phylum: Chordata
- Infraphylum: Agnatha
- Class: Petromyzontida
- Order: Petromyzontiformes
- Family: Petromyzontidae
- Genus: Lampetra
- Species: L. lanceolata

Binomial name
- Lampetra lanceolata Kux & Steiner, 1972

Species of lamprey

Lampetra lanceolata, also known as the Turkish brook lamprey or Anatolian brook lamprey, is a critically endangered species of lamprey found in select wetlands of Northern Türkiye (Turkey).
