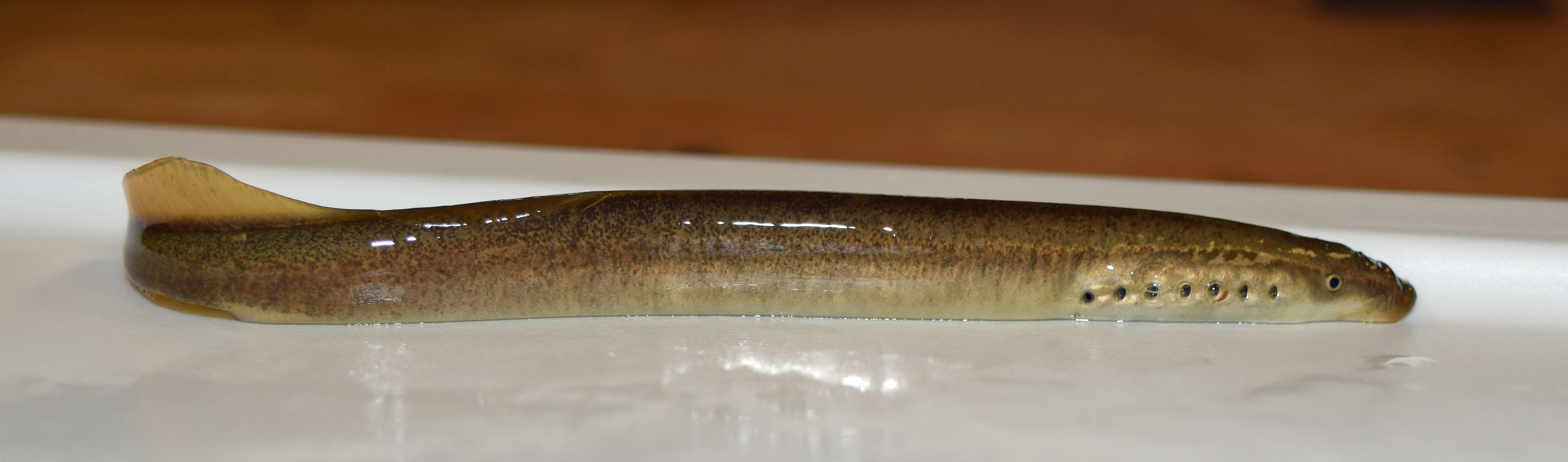

Conservation status
- Least Concern (IUCN 3.1)

Scientific classification
- Kingdom: Animalia
- Phylum: Chordata
- Infraphylum: Agnatha
- Superclass: Cyclostomi
- Class: Petromyzontida
- Order: Petromyzontiformes
- Family: Petromyzontidae
- Genus: Lampetra
- Species: L. aepyptera

Binomial name
- Lampetra aepyptera (C. C. Abbott, 1860)

Synonyms
- Ammocoetes aepyptera Abbott 1860; Lethenteron meridionale Vladykov, Kott & Pharand-Coad 1975; Okkelbergia aepyptera (Abbott 1860)

= Least brook lamprey =

Species of jawless fish

The least brook lamprey (Lampetra aepyptera) is a common, non-parasitic lamprey distributed in the Mississippi River watershed, and a limited range along the Atlantic coast.

== Description ==
As with all lamprey species, the least brook lamprey spends the majority of its life as a worm-like ammocoete. The ammocoete (5 mm–20 cm) is clear with a pigmented head when small (<5 cm), but becomes a dark/golden brown as it matures. Ammocoetes have pigmented eye spots located in the head that can detect light and dark. After metamorphosis from the ammocoete into the juvenile stage, the lamprey becomes a golden color with yellow-tinged fins. Teeth (often used to identify lamprey to species) develop on the oral disk, and the eyes develop from the eye spots at metamorphosis. Least brook lamprey do not have a juvenile period (see life cycle), and maturation continues directly into the adult stage, at which point the body swells as the gonads are developed. Populations are likely physically distinct depending on the locality where they are captured. Therefore, the physical description provided herein is only a general description. Instead, the tooth arrangements in adults, which do not vary as much between populations, should be used to identify this species positively. Ammocoetes should be tentatively identified based on prior collection history for the area in which they were found unless they are positively identified by an expert.

== Life cycle ==
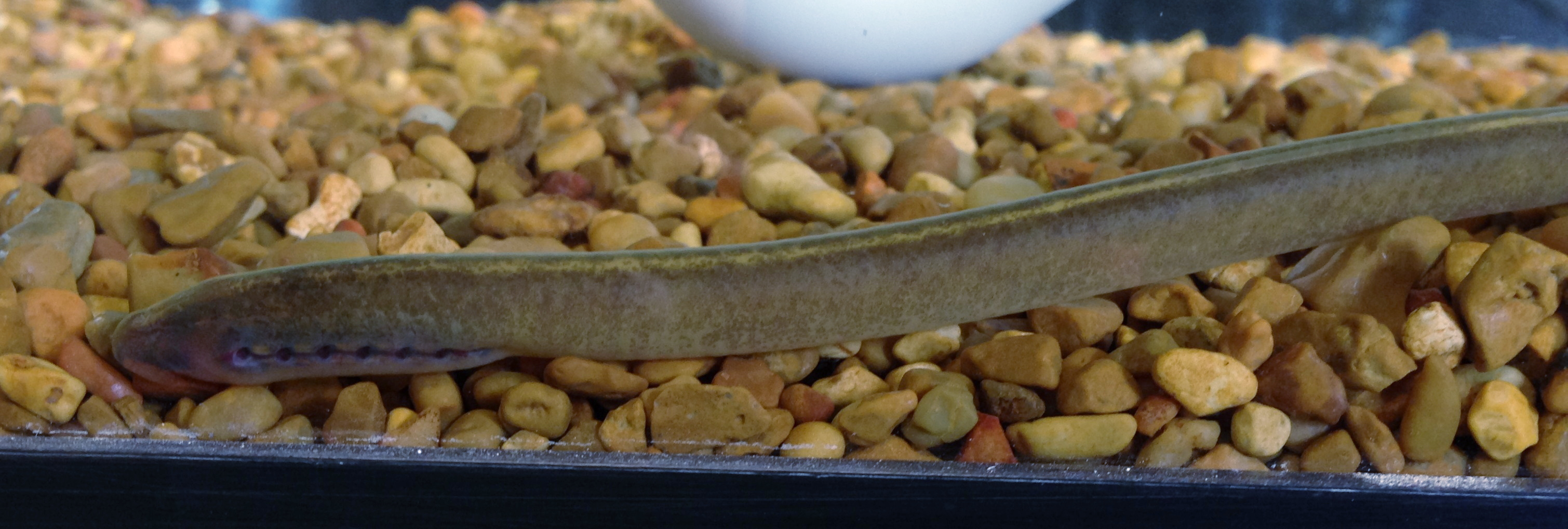
Ammocoetes lack eyes

Adults spawn in the spring in the headwaters of streams. The males (aided by females) construct small nests by picking up pebbles with their oral disks and moving them to form the rims of shallow depressions. The sticky eggs are deposited in the nest and adhere to the sand and gravel. Multiple adults may spawn in the same nest, and multiple males may spawn with the same female. As with all lamprey species, adults die after spawning.

When they first hatch, embryos remain in the nest for up to one month before they mature into ammocoetes. Ammocoetes leave the nest and seek out slow-flowing water in sandy areas, where they burrow and begin feeding. Ammocoetes live burrowed for 3–7 yr, feeding on microscopic plant and animal life and detritus (decaying matter). Mature ammocoetes will begin metamorphosis in the late summer through the fall in preparation for spawning the following year. Metamorphosing and adult brook lampreys cannot eat, since they have nonfunctional intestines, and only live for four to six months.
