= Strict nature reserve Bosco Siro Negri =

Nature reserve in Italy

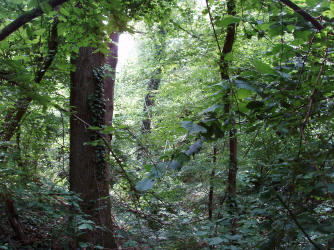
- Interactive map of Strict nature reserve Bosco Siro Negri
- Type: Strict nature reserve
- Location: Pavia
- Coordinates: 45°12′40″N 09°03′27″E
- Area: 34 ha (84 acres)
- Created: 1967
- Operator: University of Pavia
- Website: boscosironegri.unipv.it

The Strict nature reserve Bosco Siro Negri is a protected natural area owned by the University of Pavia in Italy and included in the Parco naturale lombardo della Valle del Ticino.

== History ==
The reserve is a small strip of the Po Valley that was donated to the University of Pavia in 1967 by Giuseppe Negri, a lumber dealer and a great lover of nature. The reserve is located near the Ticino, a few kilometers from the center of Pavia. The forest preserve the original state of the nature before the arrival of the Romans, before human settlement. The reserve covers an area of 34 hectares, corresponding to approximately 84 acres. In 1970, on the occasion of the European Year for the Conservation of Nature, announced by the Council of Europe, the university decided to bind the Wood as an integral nature reserve to which, at the wish of the founder, the name of his brother Siro was given.

The Siro Negri wood was established as a strict Nature Reserve by the Italian State with the Ministerial Decree of 11 December 1973 of the Ministry for Agriculture and Forests.

As a tribute to the donor's intentions, the university works to preserve the forest intact, thus not implementing any management intervention and allowing access only for the purposes of scientific research, education and surveillance. Thanks to these restrictions, the Bosco Siro Negri can be defined as integral, and has assumed a considerable naturalistic and scientific value.

The reserve is managed by the Department of Earth and Environmental Sciences of the University of Pavia (which is based in the Botanical Garden) which, thanks to the funding provided by the Ministry of the Environment and the Protection of the Territory and Mare has been able to promote scientific research and educational activities and dissemination of its natural heritage.

== Fauna ==
The animal component of the reserve is particularly rich and interesting. There are numerous species of birds that nest in the foliage of the trees and in the bushes of the reserve, including tawny owls, eurasian blackcaps, little owls, eurasian sparrow hawks, woodpeckers, common kingfisher, Cetti's warblers, pheasants, mallards, common moorhens and many others. There are several species of mammals that populate the park, including brown long-eared bats, edible dormouses, squirrels, hares, badgers, foxes, weasels and wild boars.

== Flora ==
The reserve, together with the complex of the other lowland forests of the Ticino Valley, represents one of the very rare examples of forest vegetation of the Po Valley with characteristics of good naturalness, of very low anthropic disturbance and represents the faithful testimony of an ancient naturalistic botanical heritage. The maximum height of the tallest trees is around 30/35 meters. The most common species are English oaks, elms, hornbeams and black poplars, while in the more humid areas there are silver poplars, common alders and white willows. A non-native essence is also fairly widespread: Robinia pseudoacacia. The shrub layer is also very rich, which offers nourishment and shelter to many animals, in fact there are hazelnuts, common hawthorns and elderberries, while the grassy layer is characterized by the presence, among other essences, of anemones, dog's tooth violets, horsetails, lesser periwinkles and wood violets.
