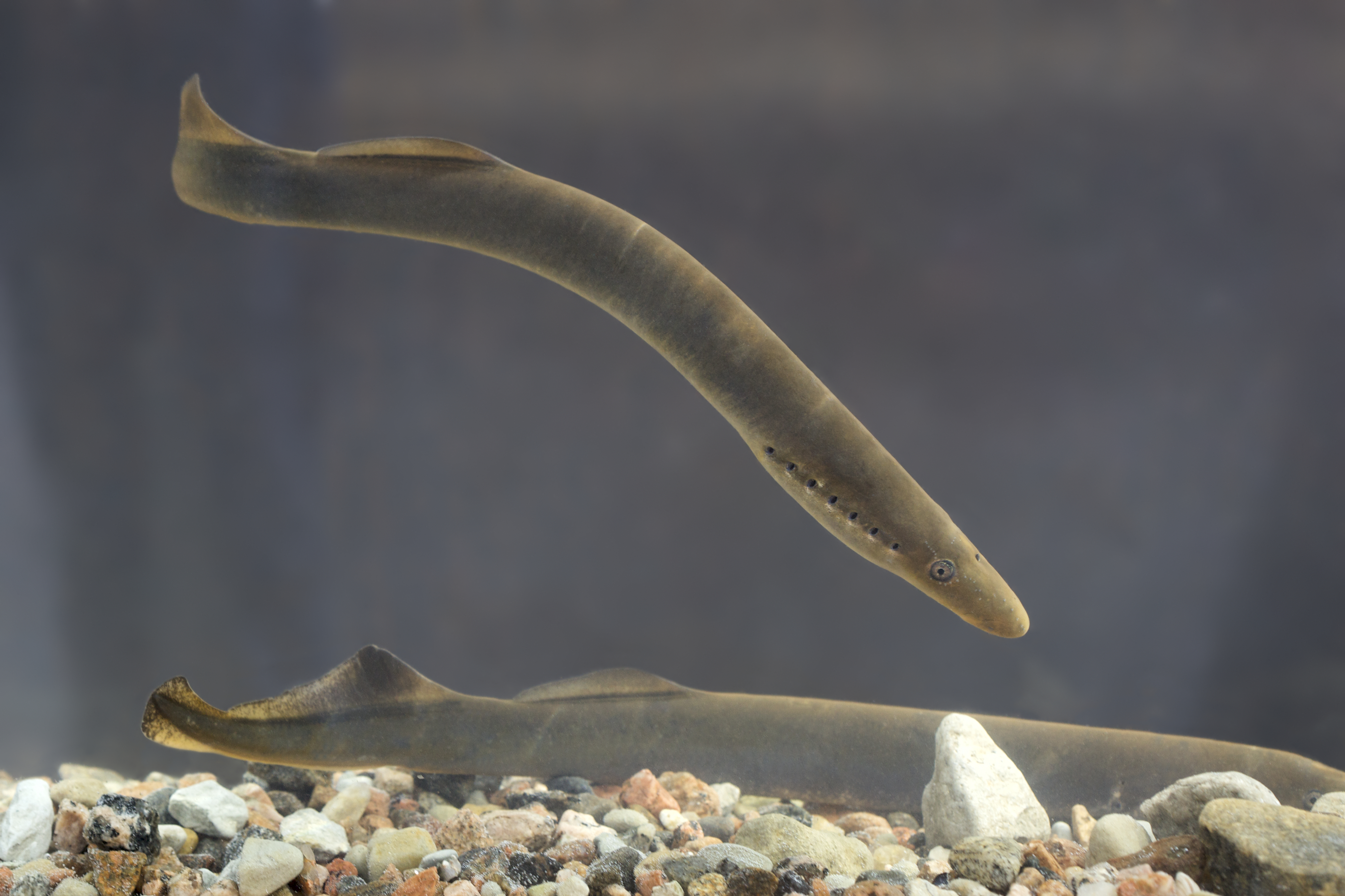
- European river lamprey (Lampetra fluviatilis) in the Pirita, Estonia

Conservation status
- Near Threatened (IUCN 3.1)

Scientific classification
- Kingdom: Animalia
- Phylum: Chordata
- Infraphylum: Agnatha
- Class: Petromyzontida
- Order: Petromyzontiformes
- Family: Petromyzontidae
- Genus: Lampetra
- Species: L. fluviatilis

Binomial name
- Lampetra fluviatilis (Linnaeus, 1758)

Synonyms
- Petromyzon fluviatilis Linnaeus 1758; Petromyzon prickus Lacepède 1798; Petromyzon branchialis Linnaeus 1758; Ammocoetus branchialis (Linnaeus 1758); Petromyzon argenteus Bloch 1795 non Kirtland 1838; Petromyzon sanguisugus Lacepède 1800; Petromyzon jurae MacCulloch 1819; ?Petromyzon macrops Blainville 1825; Ammocoetes communis Gistel 1848; Petromyzon omalii Beneden 1857; Petromyzon fluviatilis m. major Smitt 1895; Lampetra opisthodon Gratzianov 1907; Lampetra fluviatilis f. typica Berg 1931; Lampetra fluviatilis f. praecox Berg 1932; Lampetra fluviatilis m. ladogensis Ivanova-Berg 1966

= European river lamprey =

Species of freshwater lamprey

The European river lamprey (Lampetra fluviatilis), also known as the river lamprey or lampern, is a species of freshwater lamprey.

== Description ==
Adult river lampreys measure from 25 to 40 cm (10 to 16 in) in the marine forms and up to 28 cm (11 in)in the lake forms. The very elongated body is uniformly dark grey on top, paler to yellowish off-white on the sides and pure white underneath. Like all lampreys, they lack paired fins and have a circular sucking disc instead of jaws. They have a single nostril and seven small gill slits on each side behind the eye. The teeth are sharp and these fish can be distinguished from the somewhat smaller brook lamprey (Lampetra planeri) by the fact that the two dorsal fins are more widely separated.

== Distribution ==
The European river lamprey is found in coastal waters around almost all of Europe from the northwestern Mediterranean Sea north to the lakes of Finland, Scotland, Norway (Mjøsa), Wales (Cors Caron), and Russia, including rivers in the Alps; especially in Nakkila, Finland and Latvian coastal towns such as Carnikava, Salacgrīva and Pāvilosta. European river lampreys are a traditional local delicacy.

Its conservation status was originally listed as Near Threatened in 1996, but since 2008 it has been listed as Least Concern, following recovery of populations after pollution problems in central and western Europe. However, an assessment for the Baltic Sea published in 2014 classified the river lamprey as "Near Threatened" in this region, supported by the IUCN's 2024 classification. In August 2018, Spain declared it officially extinct in its territory.

== Prey ==
Like many lampreys, this species feeds as an ectoparasite and parasite of fish. It clings on to the flanks or gills of the fish with its sucker and rasps at the tissue underneath.

== Taxonomy ==
River lampreys belong to the same genus as the brook lamprey and are thought to be very closely related. Current thinking suggests that European brook and river lampreys are a paired species, with the river lamprey representing the anadromous (seagoing) form of the resident brook lamprey. However, this is an area of active research.

== Reproductive cycle ==
The European river lamprey has a reproductive cycle similar to that of the salmon. River lampreys migrate upstream from the sea to spawning grounds in autumn and winter. Spawning activity is greatest in the springtime (like the brook lamprey) and after spawning, the adults die. The young larvae, known as ammocoetes, spend several years in soft sediment before migrating to the sea as adults. It is thought that these fish spend two to three years in marine habitats before making the return trip to spawn.

== Statistics ==
As ammocoetes, these animals are difficult to identify beyond genus level (Lampetra) because of their close resemblance to brook lamprey. They average 30 cm in length as adults, and some may be considerably smaller (20 cm), but in any case they are considerably larger than adult brook lampreys (12–14 cm). They generally weigh 150 g, and their maximum lifespan is about 10 years.

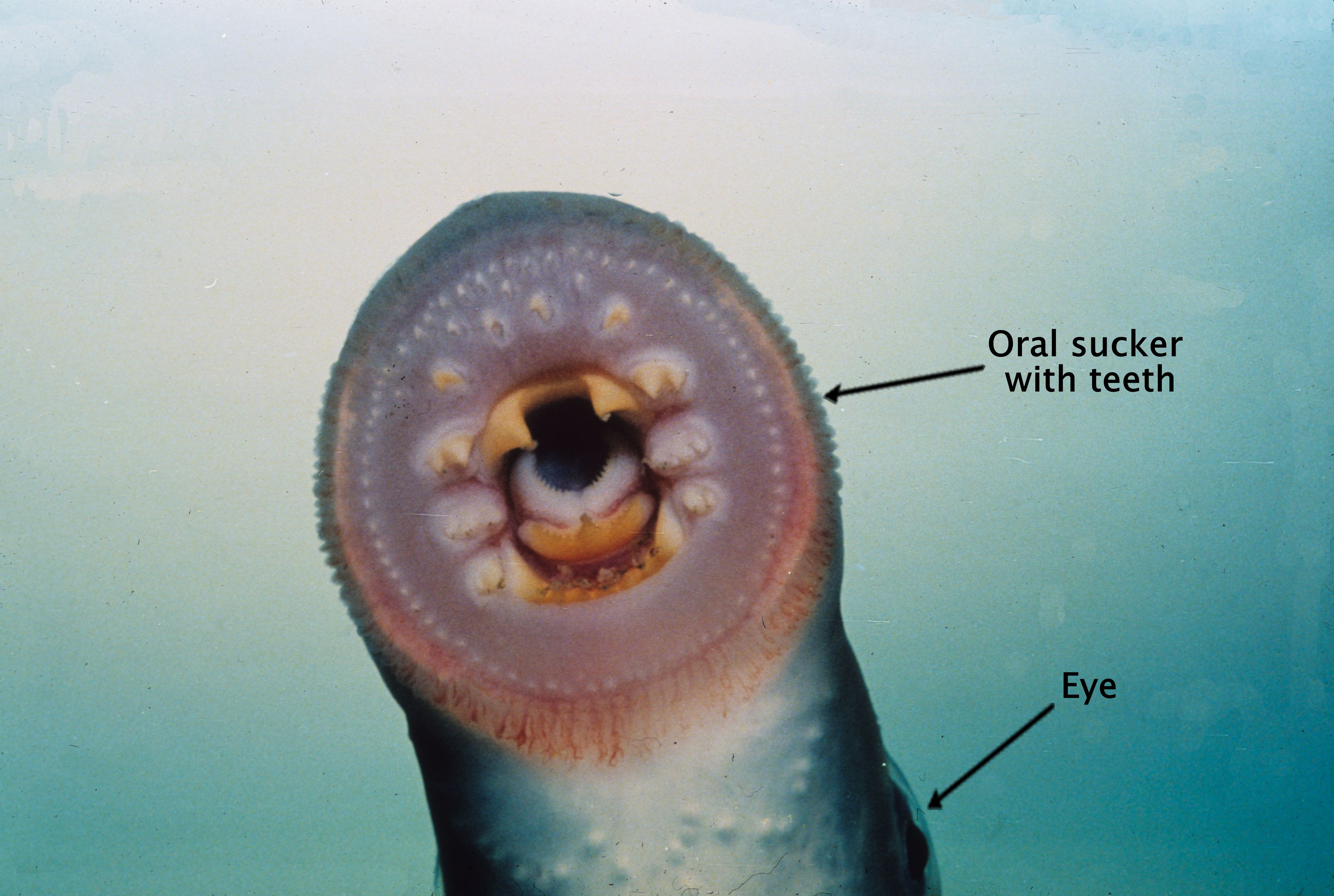
Mouth of a river lamprey

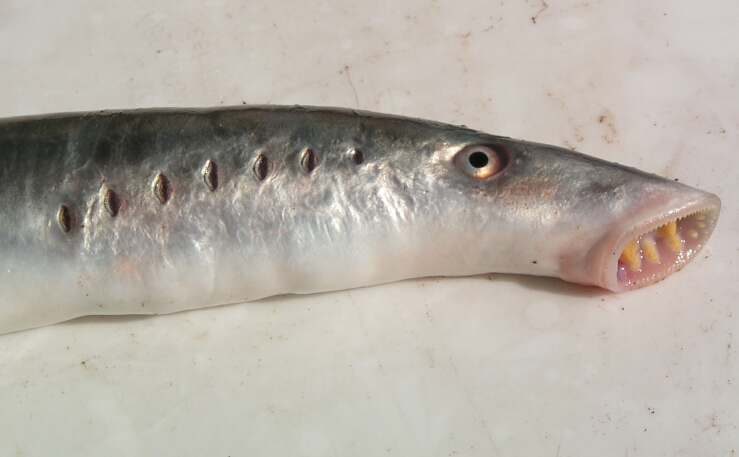
Top view

== See also ==
- Lamprey pie
