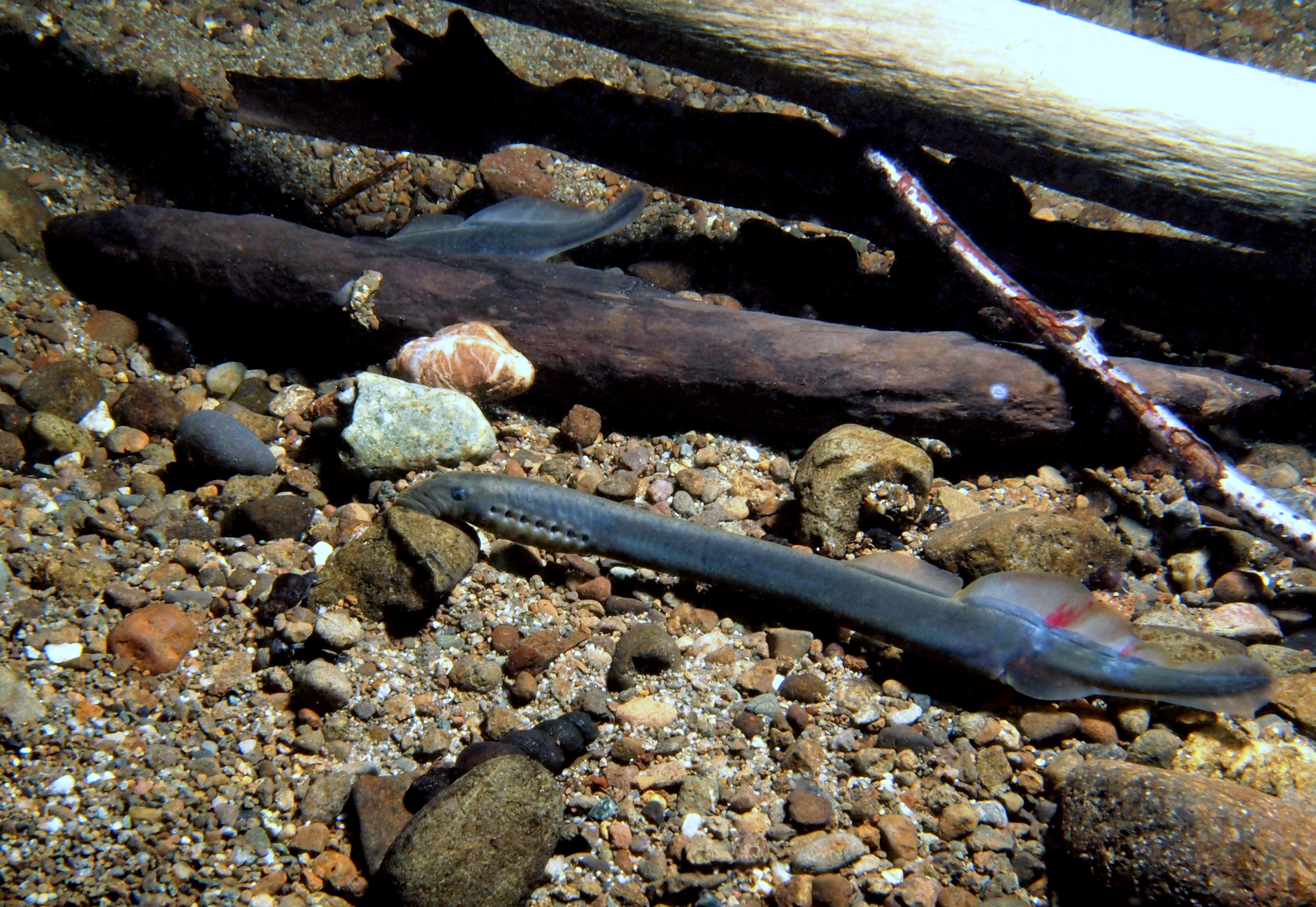

Conservation status
- Least Concern (IUCN 3.1)

Scientific classification
- Kingdom: Animalia
- Phylum: Chordata
- Infraphylum: Agnatha
- Superclass: Cyclostomi
- Class: Petromyzontida
- Order: Petromyzontiformes
- Family: Petromyzontidae
- Genus: Lampetra
- Species: L. richardsoni

Binomial name
- Lampetra richardsoni Vladykov and Follett, 1965

Synonyms
- Lampetra richardsoni var. marifuga Beamish & Withler 1986

= Western brook lamprey =

Species of jawless fish

The western brook lamprey (Lampetra richardsoni) is a small (<18 cm), widely distributed, non-parasitic species of jawless fish endemic to the freshwater coastal waterways of the Western United States and Canada. Its range extends from the North American Pacific coast from Taku River, southern Alaska, Haida Gwaii, to central California, including Vancouver Island, with major inland distributions in the Columbia and Sacramento-San Joaquin watersheds.

One endangered parasitic variety, the Morrison Creek lamprey (Lampetra richardsoni var. marifuga), is unique to Morrison Creek, Vancouver Island, British Columbia. Which is larger in size (15 – 18 cm). The Morrison Creek lamprey is able to feed after it becomes an adult unlike the western brook lamprey which can only feed in its larval stage.

The western brook lamprey is Not at Risk (Yellow List) and does not have a Species at Risk Act.

It spawns in spring until mid-summer when the water temperature is over 10 degrees Celsius. They create nests made out of gravel, and after hatching they are swept downstream into quieter parts of the stream and burrow into the ground. They stay in these quiet areas for about four years until eventually turning into adults. When they become adults in late summer to late fall they do not eat. After the lamprey spawns it dies.
