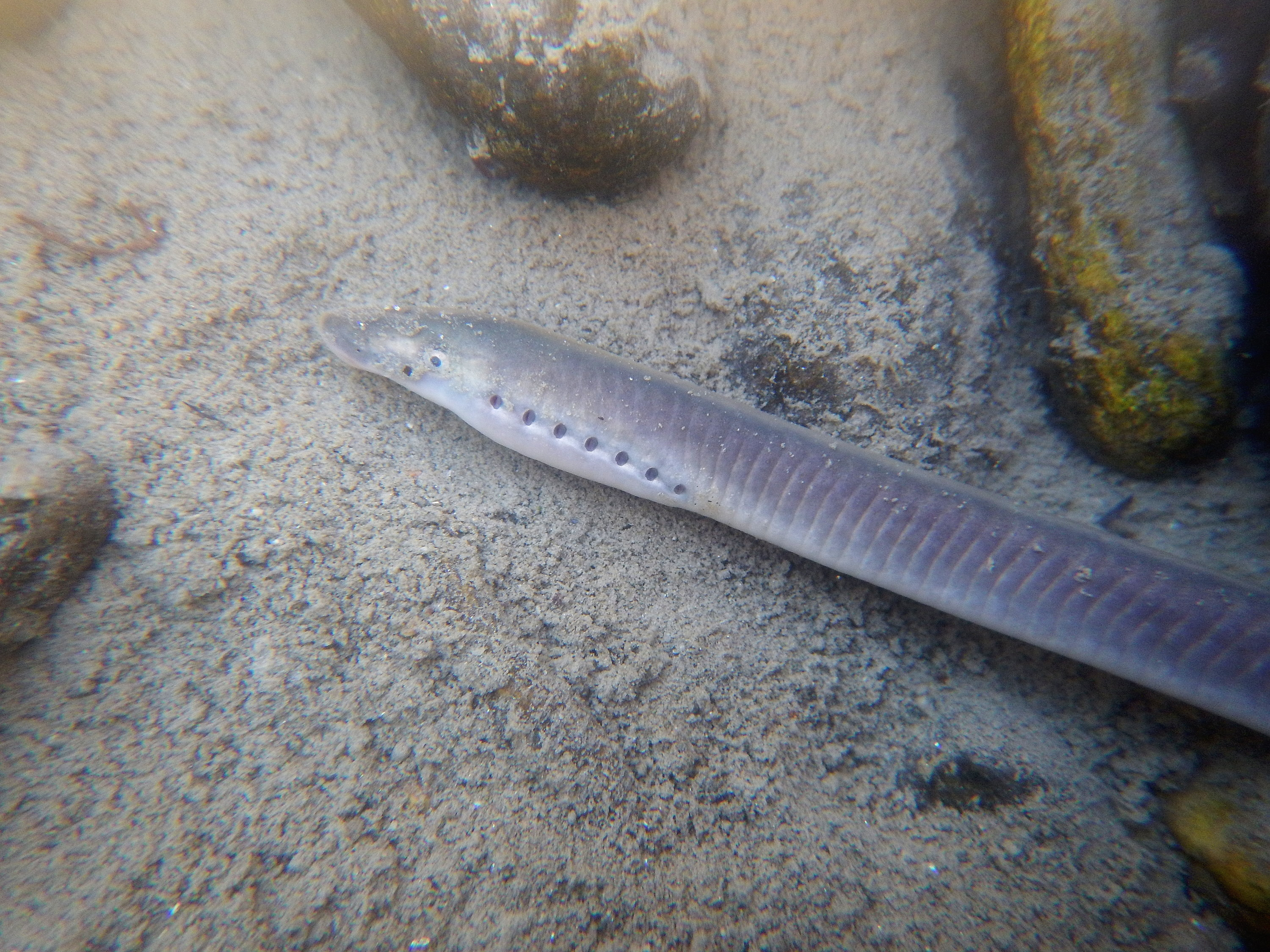

Conservation status
- Near Threatened (IUCN 3.1)

Scientific classification
- Kingdom: Animalia
- Phylum: Chordata
- Infraphylum: Agnatha
- Superclass: Cyclostomi
- Class: Petromyzontida
- Order: Petromyzontiformes
- Family: Petromyzontidae
- Genus: Lampetra
- Species: L. zanandreai

Binomial name
- Lampetra zanandreai (Vladykov, 1955)

Synonyms
- Lethenteron zanandreai Vladykov 1955; Lampetra planeri zanandreai (Vladykov 1955)

= Lampetra zanandreai =

Lombardy lamprey

Species of jawless fish

Lampetra zanandreai, the Lombardy lamprey, is a species of lamprey in the Petromyzontidae family. It is found in Croatia, Italy, and Slovenia. Its natural habitats are rivers and freshwater springs. It is threatened by habitat loss.
