= Wood violet =

Wood violet is a common name for several plants and may refer to:

- Viola odorata, native to Europe and Asia
- Viola palmata, native to eastern North America, and introduced to Japan and central Europe
- Viola riviniana, native to Eurasia and Africa
- Viola sororia, native to eastern North America
