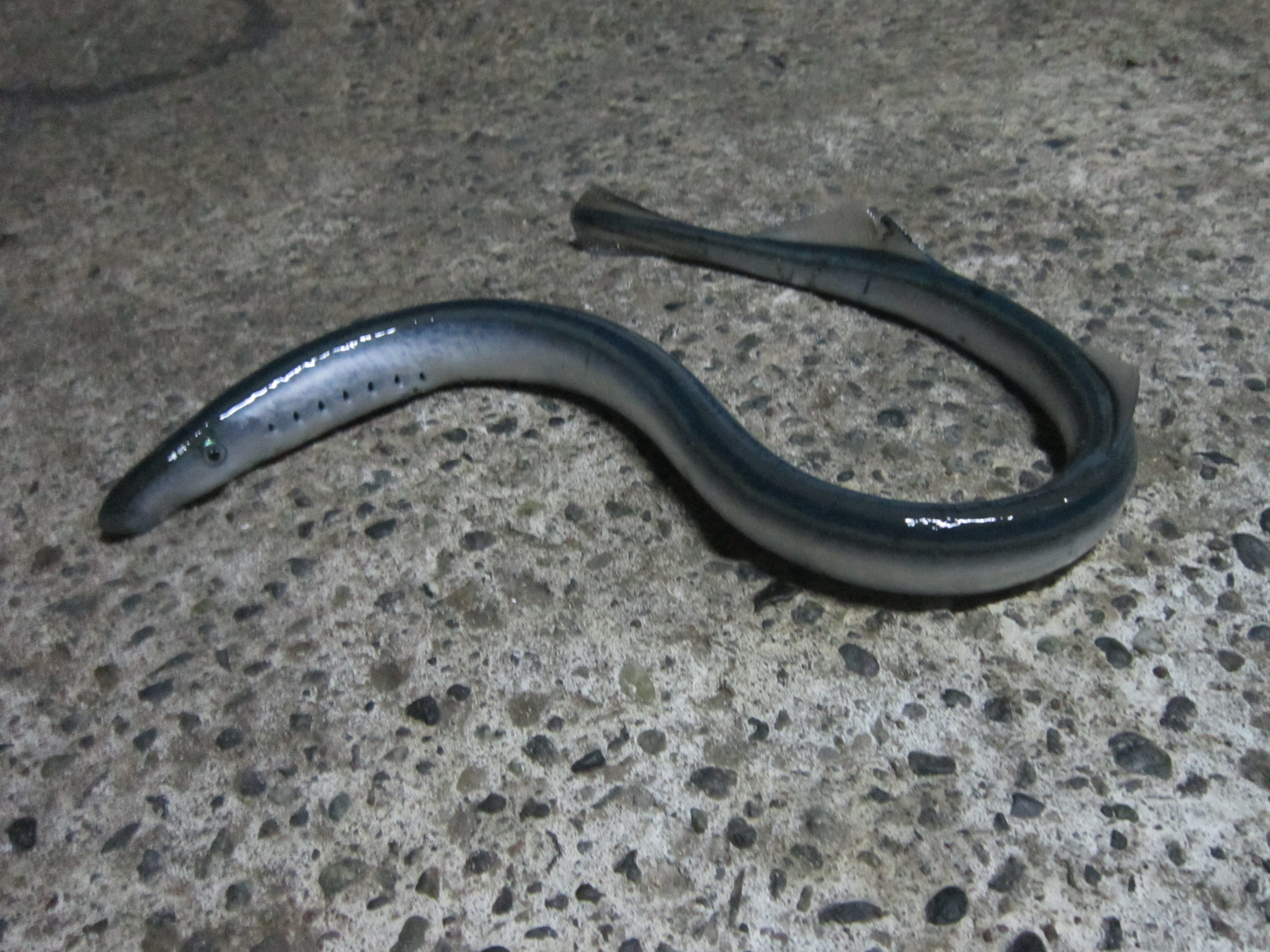

Conservation status
- Vulnerable (IUCN 3.1)

Scientific classification
- Kingdom: Animalia
- Phylum: Chordata
- Infraphylum: Agnatha
- Class: Petromyzontida
- Order: Petromyzontiformes
- Family: Mordaciidae
- Genus: Mordacia
- Species: M. lapicida

Binomial name
- Mordacia lapicida (J. E. Gray, 1851)

Synonyms
- Caragola lapicida J. E. Gray, 1851; Petromyzon anwandteri Philippi 1863; Petromyzon acutidens Philippi 1865

= Mordacia lapicida =

Species of jawless fish

== Identification ==
Chilean lamprey (Mordacia lapicida), also known as lamprea de agua dulce, is a species of southern top-eyed lamprey endemic to southern Chile that can be found in riverine and marine habitats. Lampreys have eel-like (anguilliform) bodies with a rhomboid caudal fin, no bones or scales, and no lateral line. They have seven gill pores that run along the side of their bodies, a single nostril on the top of their heads, and two dorsal fins located toward the tail-end of their bodies. Southern top-eyed lamprey can reach a length of 54 centimeters (21 in) Standard Length (SL; measure from the snout to the end of the caudal peduncle) as adults, and 154 millimeters Total Length (TL; measure from the snout to the tip of the fully extended tail fin) as ammocoetes.

Ammocoetes and adults of this species are found in rivers, and occur in fine sand along river banks. The life cycle of a Mordacia lapicida is divided into four life stages: freshwater rearing, an ocean parasite, an adult spawning stage, and a senescent stage. Once in the adult stage, individuals migrate into marine waters where they attack and attach themselves to marine fishes.

== Life-History ==
Species in the Mordacia genus have a life cycle that consists of four main stages: larva (ammocoetes), juvenile, adult, and senescent. In general, lamprey ammocoetes burrow into the sediment of their freshwater habitat and filter feed for several years before undergoing a radical metamorphosis. It is suggested that as larvae, Chilean lamprey feed on unicellular algae. They are found in rivers with fine substrate and abundant organic material near the banks. It is believed that their occurrence near river mouths is influenced by salinity and their preference to lower levels of dissolved oxygen. The duration of the larval stage of Chilean lamprey specifically is unknown, but they begin to metamorphose into juveniles in fall and winter, between August and March. The metamorphosis stage of lamprey involves the development of functional eyes, a suctorial oral disc with a protrusible tongue-like piston, and the enlargement of their dorsal fins. They then enter marine waters between June and August, in austral winter.

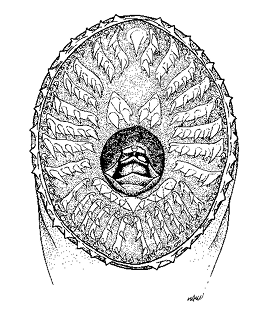
Oral disc of Mordacia lapicida.

M.lapicida are an anadromous species so they migrate out to sea as juveniles to feed, but information about their upstream migration and reproduction remains largely understudied. However, it is known that Chilean lamprey are parasitic blood-feeders due to their large oral discs that allow for a suction seal around the attachment site of their host. This seal prevents a loss in the blood consumed, creates a discreet wound on the host, and allows for the production of lamphredin, an anticoagulant, that promotes tissue breakdown and prevents the host's blood from clotting as they feed. The exact host species of the Chilean lamprey is not known, though blood-feeding lampreys typically feed on larger hosts than flesh-eating lampreys. Additionally, their bites don't always end in the death of their host, unlike with flesh-eating lampreys.

Although studies on Southern Hemisphere lampreys are minimal, a study on the lamprey species G. macrostoma, inferred that they prey on Baleen whales and detach from them at the Antarctic Convergence zone. This may give some insight on M. lapicida hosts. Ultimately, spawning behavior and nesting locations are unknown for Chilean lamprey, though it is estimated that they have a slower growth rate compared to Northern Hemisphere lamprey.

All lamprey species are semelparous, with a few exceptions. This means that they die soon after spawning just once in their entire lifetime. After their at-sea juvenile stage, adult lamprey return to freshwater streams to spawn. Spawning results in severe atrophy of the intestine, degeneration of the eyes and liver, depletion of lipids, and the inability to osmoregulate in saltwater for anadromous species, like the Chilean lamprey. Thus, lamprey die within a few days of spawning, with different species having varying survival times.

== Taxonomy ==
The Chilean lamprey belongs to the infraphylum/superclass Agnatha, the jawless fishes. This superclass is only made up of the classes Myxini (hagfish) and Petromyzontida (lampreys). They belong to the order Petromyzontiformes, which includes three families: Geotriidae and Mordaciidae in the Southern Hemisphere, and Petromyzontidae in the Northern Hemisphere. Southern Hemisphere lampreys are divided into two families, Mordaciidae and Geotriidae, both with only a single genus–Mordacia and Geotria respectively. The species within these genera can be distinguished by the position of their eyes, color of their dorsal surface, and caudal fins. The species within the family Mordaciidae are called the Southern top-eyed lampreys because their eyes are positioned dorsolaterally, or closer to the top of their heads. They are also a brownish-grey color as juveniles, and their dorsal fins are contiguous as pre-metamorphosed juveniles. In comparison, Geotria have blue-green stripes and their dorsal fins are not contiguous. Within the genus Mordacia, there are 3 species: M. lapicida, M. praecox, and M. mordax., which are primarily distinguished by their location and dentition. M. preacox and M. mordax are found in Australia, while M. lapicida is found in South America (Chile). Additionally, M. mordax has fewer teeth on its radial plates than M. lapicida.

== Distribution ==
Since Chilean lamprey have not been extensively studied, it is estimated based on sightings that they inhabit coastal zones within the locations highlighted in the map shown below, with the points representing recorded collections. It is suggested that this species stays close to the coast and only inhabits marine waters for short periods in their lifetime. Chilean lamprey have a relatively small distribution area with reports that they occur along the coast of Chile from 33° S to 41° S.

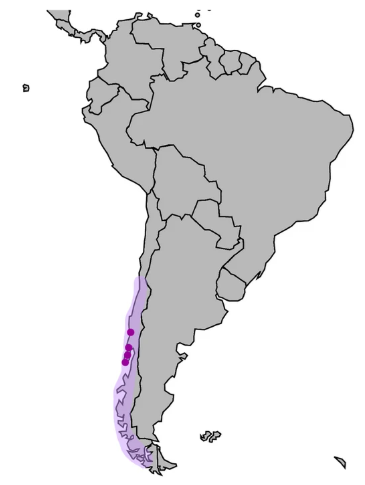
Mordacia distributions

== Conservation Status ==
Drought and the overuse of water resources in Chile has resulted in water-channel narrowing and may be affecting lamprey populations. As seen with a species in the Geotriidae family (G. australis), the introduction of other fish in these freshwater habitats could be harmful to Chilean lamprey larvae due to predation. Currently, M. lapicida is listed as "endangered" by the Chilean government and there was a 15-year extraction ban issued for them in 2011 by the Chilean Under-secretariat of Fisheries.

Generally, all the life stages of lampreys play an important role for the environments they inhabit. The burrowing and filter-feeding behaviors of larvae increase substrate oxygen levels and convert phytoplankton into stored biomass. In the senescent stage of anadromous lampreys, they transport and leave behind marine-derived nutrients and materials in freshwater streams when they die. Mordacia lapicida, in particular, requires further research to examine the extent of its effects on its environment, how it interacts with conspecifics and prey, and what its role might mean in a human context.
