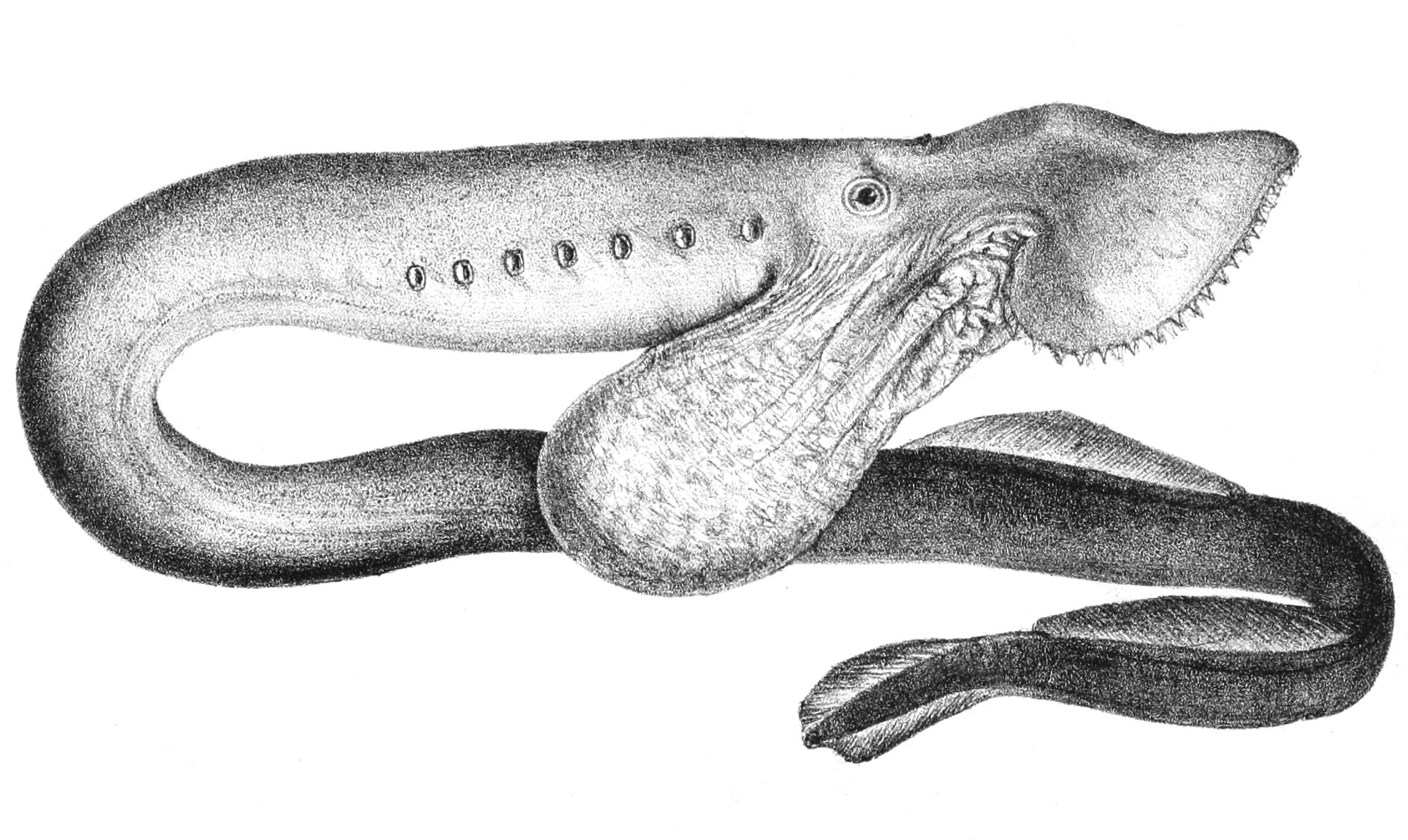
- Drawing by W. Wing

Conservation status
- Data Deficient (IUCN 3.1)

Scientific classification
- Kingdom: Animalia
- Phylum: Chordata
- Infraphylum: Agnatha
- Class: Petromyzontida
- Order: Petromyzontiformes
- Family: Geotriidae
- Genus: Geotria
- Species: G. australis

Binomial name
- Geotria australis J. E. Gray, 1851

Synonyms
- Genus synonymy: Chilopterus Philippi 1858; Dionisia Lahille 1915 non Landau Chabaud, Miltgen & Baccam 1980; Exomegas Gill 1883 non Burmeister 1868; Macrophthalmia Plate 1897; Neomordacia Castelnau 1872; Thysanochilus Troschel 1857 non Butler 1878 non non Falc. 1839; Velasia Gray 1853; Yarra Castelnau 1872 non Krapp-Schickel 2000; Species synonymy: Velasia chilensis Gray 1851; Thysanochilus valdivianus Philippi 1857; Ammocoetes caeruleus Philippi 1858; Chilopterus caeruleus (Philippi 1857); Ammocoetes landbecki Philippi 1858; Chilopterus landbecki (Philippi 1857); Exomegas macrostomus (Burmeister 1868); Petromyzon fonki Philippi 1865; Petromyzon macrostomus Burmeister 1868; Yarra singularis Castelnau 1872; Neomordacia howittii Castelnau 1872; Geotria allporti Günther 1872; Velasia stenostomus Ogilby 1896; Macrophthalmia chilensis Plate 1897; Geotria macrostoma f. gallegensis Smitt 1901; Geotria macrostoma gallegensis (Smitt 1901); Geotria gallegensis (Smitt 1901); Geotria saccifera Regan 1911; Dionisia patagonica Lahille 1915

= Pouched lamprey =

Species of lamprey

The pouched lamprey (Geotria australis), also known as the piharau in New Zealand's North Island, korokoro, kanakana in the South Island, or wide-mouthed lamprey, is a species in the genus Geotria, which is the only genus in the family Geotriidae. The second species in the genus is the Argentinian lamprey (Geotria macrostoma), which was revalidated as a separate species in 2020. The pouched lamprey is native to the southern hemisphere. It spends the early part of its life in fresh water, migrating to the sea as an adult, and returning to fresh water to spawn and die.

== Description ==
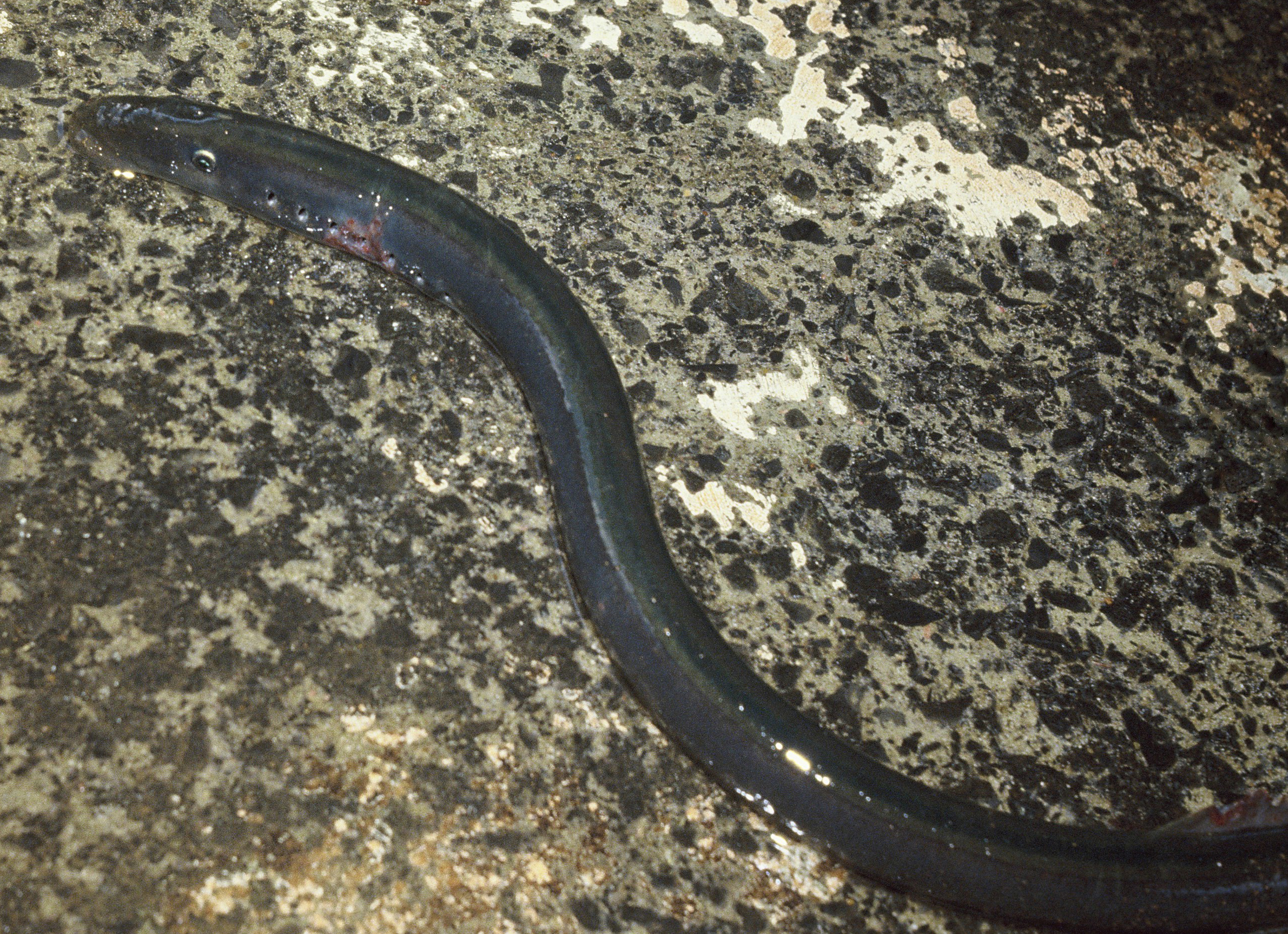
Geotria australis, Northland, New Zealand

G. australis, like other lampreys, has a thin eel-like body, and grows up to 60 cm (24 in) long. It has two low dorsal fins on the back half. Like other lampreys, it has no jaws, only a sucker. The skin is a striking silver in adult lampreys caught fresh from the sea but soon changes to brown after they have been in fresh water for some time, due to deposition of biliverdin. Adults' eyes are relatively small and located on the side of the head. When fully mature, males develop a baggy pouch under their eyes, which may be used to massage and oxygenate their eggs. There have also been suggestions that the pouch in northern hemisphere species has been used by males during breeding times for gathering stones to make a nest.

== Life cycle ==
The freshwater ammocoete or larval stage of the life cycle are a dull brown in colour for most of their lives. Ammocoetes remain in fresh water for about four years until undergoing a six-month metamorphosis, changing to silver with blue-green stripes. The central nervous system of the pouched lamprey develops notably during metamorphosis to the large-eyed macropthalmia stage, with particularly large increases in the volume of visual areas of the brain. At this point they migrate downstream to the sea.

Adults spend some of their lives in the open sea, living as parasites on other fish. They attach themselves to the gills or side of the fish and rasp at the tissues below. Adults return to fresh water to breed, spending up to eighteen months sexually maturing before spawning. Adults have been recorded living up to 105 days after spawning and wrapping themselves around egg masses to provide parental care.

== Distribution and habitat ==
The pouched lamprey is widespread in the Southern Hemisphere, occurring in New Zealand, Chile, Argentina, the Falkland Islands, South Georgia and the southwest and southeast corners of Australia. It is the only lamprey species found in New Zealand.

== Threats ==
Lampreys are preyed on by albatrosses, shags, large fish and marine mammals. It has been hypothesised that the apparent decline in lamprey numbers could be caused by the degradation of water quality in lowland waterways.

== History ==
Pouched lampreys are a traditional Māori delicacy in New Zealand. Traditional methods for catching lampreys included disturbing the lampreys as they ascended waterfalls and capturing them, or by using utu piharau, which involved placing a weir across larger rivers which led to a hīnaki (woven trap). Some utu piharau across the Whanganui River were more than 15 m (49 ft) across. Pouched lampreys were widely seen in New Zealand in the mid-19th century, and were adopted as a food by European settlers, due to the history of lampreys as delicacies in Europe.
