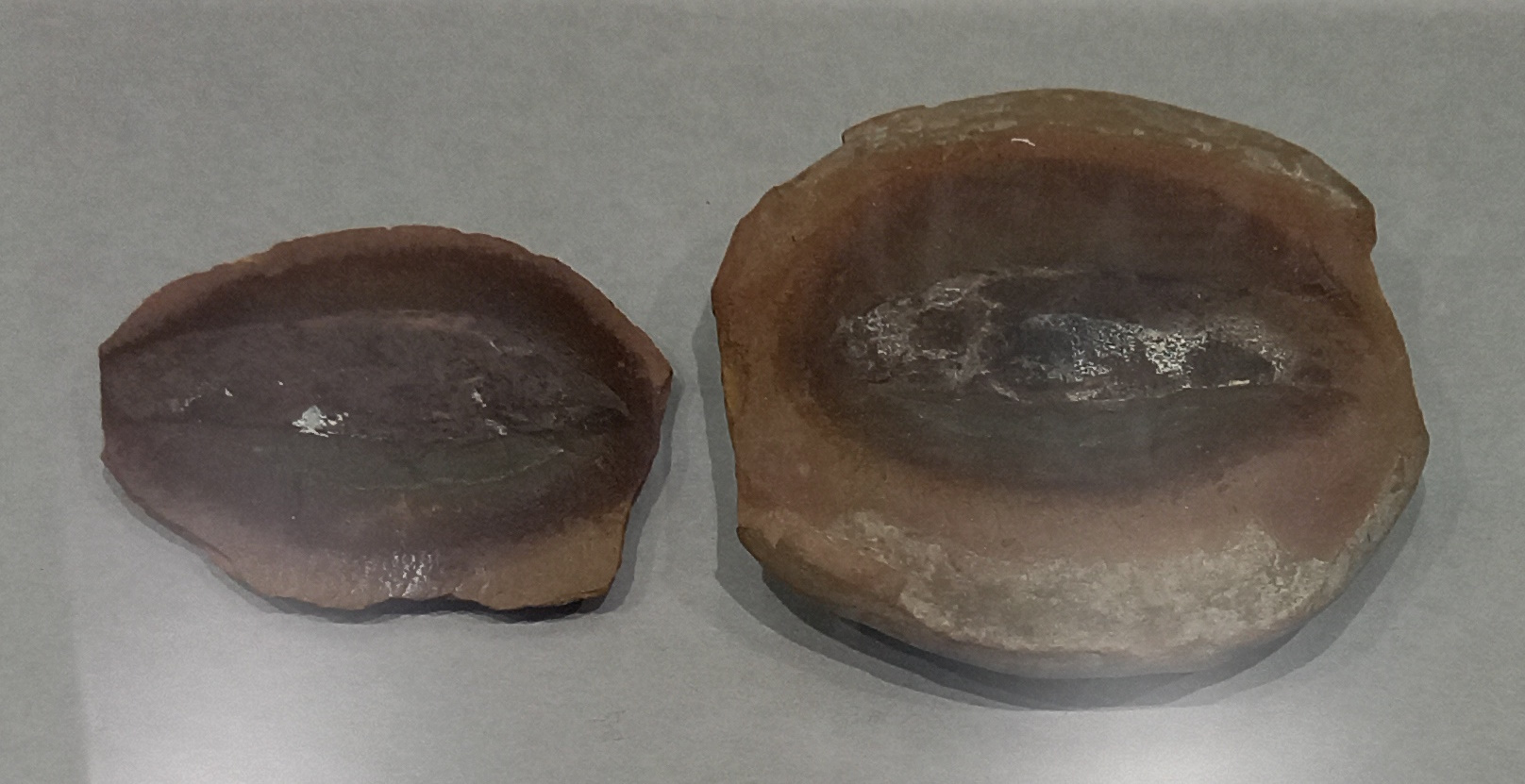
- Fossil specimens displayed at the Nagoya City Science Museum
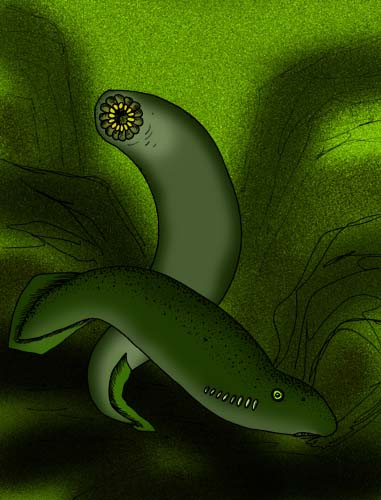
- Life restoration

Scientific classification
- Kingdom: Animalia
- Phylum: Chordata
- Infraphylum: Agnatha
- Superclass: Cyclostomi
- Class: Petromyzontida
- Order: Petromyzontiformes
- Genus: †Pipiscius; Bardack & Richardson, 1977
- Species: †P. zangerli

Binomial name
- †Pipiscius zangerli Bardack & Richardson, 1977

= Pipiscius =

Pipiscius Temporal range: Moscovian (Middle) Pennsylvanian Epoch, Carboniferous Period

Extinct genus of lampreys

Pipiscius is an extinct genus of lamprey that lived about 300 million years ago, during the Middle Pennsylvanian Epoch of the Carboniferous Period. The genus contains a single species, P. zangerli, known from the Mazon Creek fossil beds located in present-day Illinois.

It has a distinctive crown-like mouth comprising a ring of radially arranged teeth. However, some specimens assigned to the coeval lamprey Mayomyzon, also found in the Mazon Creek beds, also have similar mouthparts. Since Pipiscius does not have many any other defining features, it has been suggested that the two genera are synonymous, with the name Mayomyzon having priority.

Fossil collectors have nicknamed Pipiscius the "Push me-Pull you" in reference to each end being very similar in shape.

== See also ==
- Paleozoic jawless fish
- Prehistoric jawless fish genera
