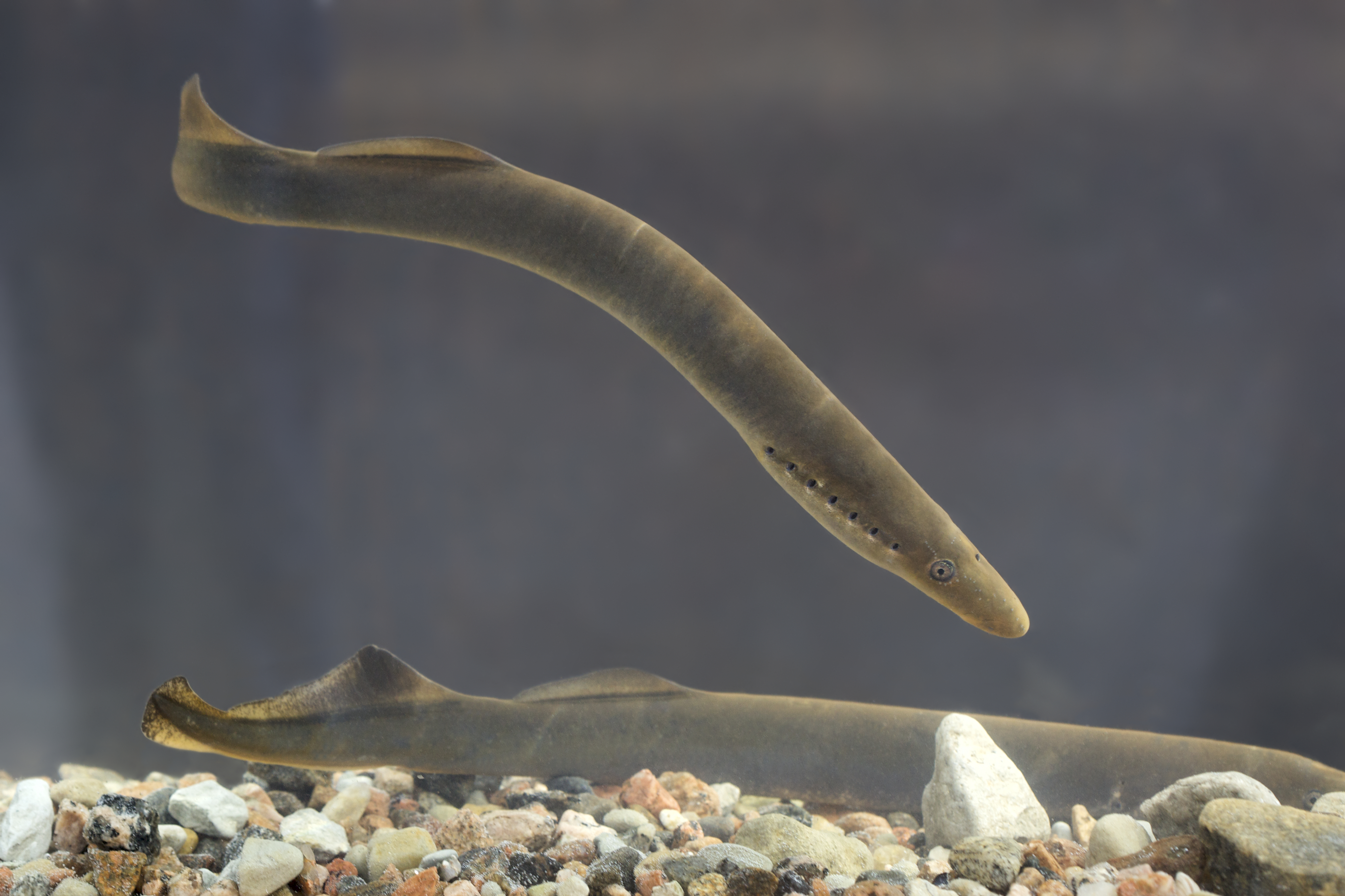
- A European river lamprey (Lampetra fluviatilis)

Scientific classification
- Kingdom: Animalia
- Phylum: Chordata
- Infraphylum: Agnatha
- Superclass: Cyclostomi
- Class: Petromyzontida
- Order: Petromyzontiformes; Berg, 1940

Type species
- Petromyzon marinus Linnaeus, 1758

Subgroups
- †Caeruleum; †Hardistiella; †Hebeimyzon; †Mayomyzon; †Mesomyzon; †Pipiscius; †Priscomyzon; †Yanliaomyzon; Geotriidae; Mordaciidae; Petromyzontidae

Synonyms
- Hyperoartia Müller, 1844

= Lamprey =

Lamprey Temporal range: Late Devonian – Holocene

Class of jawless fish

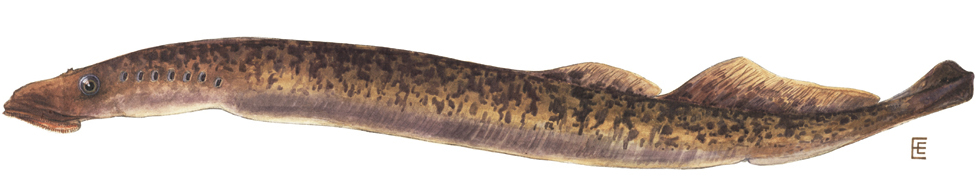
Sea lamprey, Petromyzon marinus

Mouth of a sea lamprey, Petromyzon marinus

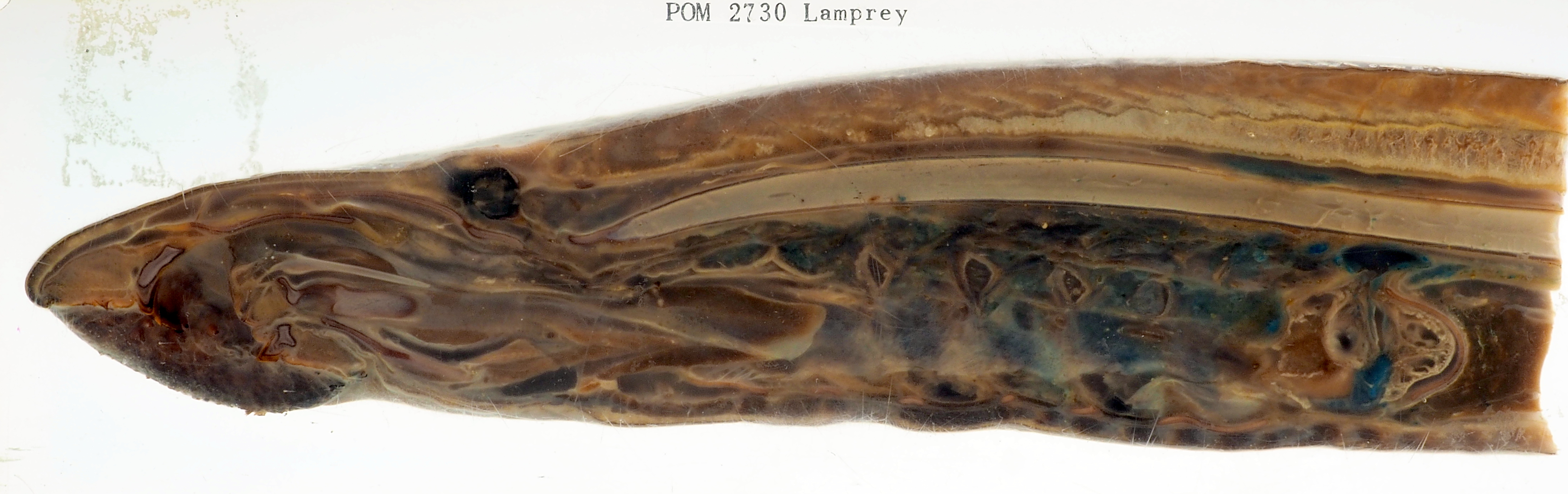
Median section of lamprey demonstrating internal anatomy

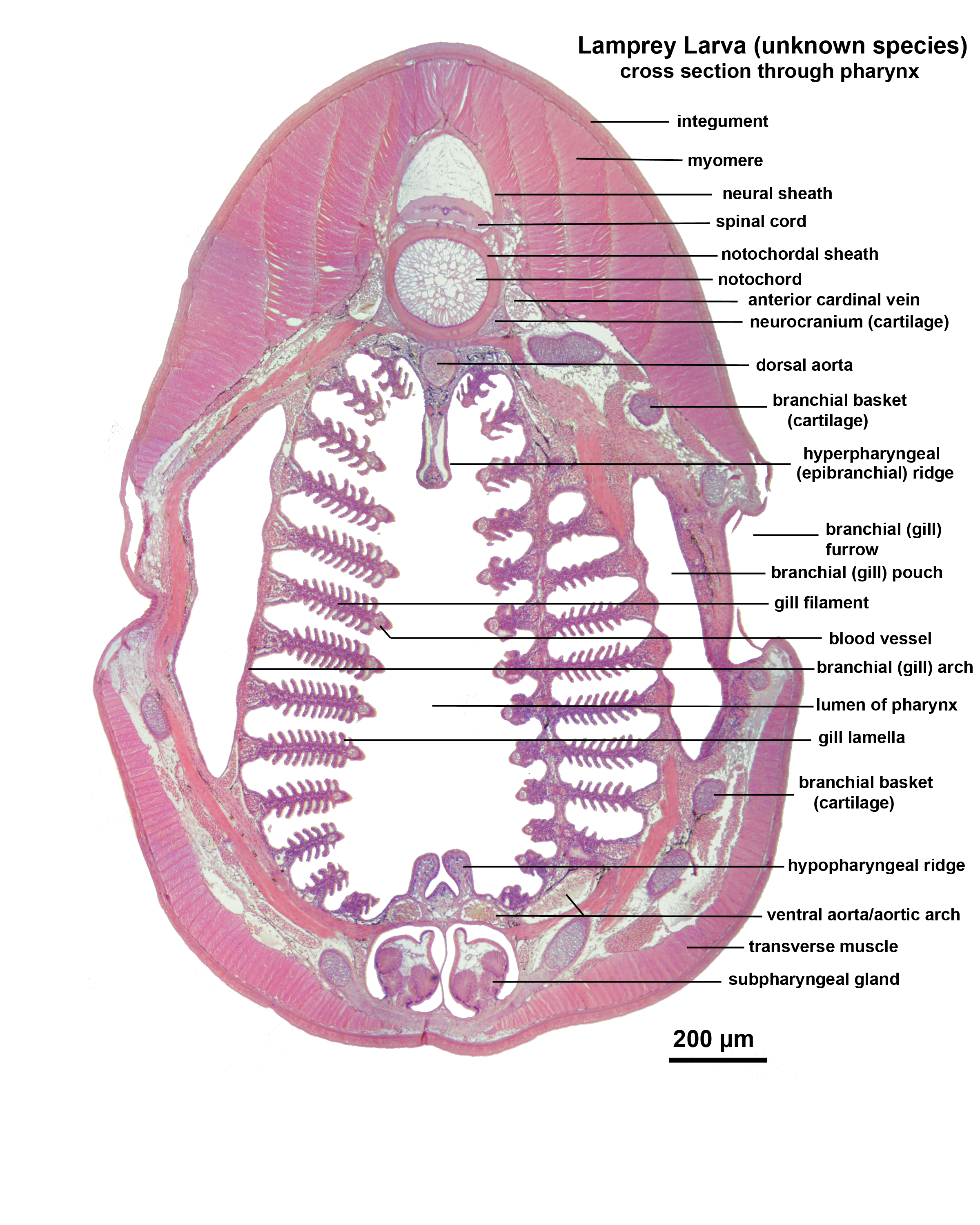
Microscopic cross section through the pharynx of a larva from an unknown lamprey species

Lampreys /ˈlæmpreɪz/ (sometimes inaccurately called lamprey eels) are a group of jawless fish composing the order Petromyzontiformes /ˌpɛtroʊmɪˈzɒntɪfɔːrmiːz/, sole order in the class Petromyzontida (or Petromyzonti). The adult lamprey is characterized by a toothed, funnel-like, sucking mouth. The common name "lamprey" is probably derived from Latin lampetra, which may mean "stone licker" (lambere "to lick" + petra "stone"), though the etymology is uncertain. "Lamprey" is sometimes seen for the plural form.

About 38 extant species of lampreys are known, with around seven known extinct species. They are classified in three families—two small families in the Southern Hemisphere (Geotriidae, Mordaciidae) and one large family in the Northern Hemisphere (Petromyzontidae).

Genetic evidence suggests that lampreys are more closely related to hagfish, the only other living group of jawless fish, than they are to jawed vertebrates, forming the superclass Cyclostomi. The oldest fossils of stem-group lampreys are from the latest Devonian, around 360 million years ago, with modern-looking forms only appearing during the Jurassic, around 163 million years ago, with the modern families likely splitting from each other sometime between the Middle Jurassic and the end of the Cretaceous.

Modern lampreys spend the majority of their lives in the juvenile "ammocoete" stage, where they burrow into the sediment and filter feed. Adult carnivorous lampreys are the most well-known species, and feed by boring into the flesh of other fish (or in rare cases marine mammals) to consume flesh and/or blood; but only 18 species of lampreys engage in this predatory lifestyle (with Caspiomyzon suggested to feed on carrion rather than live prey). Of the 18 carnivorous species, nine migrate from salt water to fresh water to breed (some of them also have freshwater populations), and nine live exclusively in fresh water. All noncarnivorous forms are freshwater species. Adults of the noncarnivorous species do not feed; they live on reserves acquired as ammocoetes.

== Distribution ==
Lampreys live mostly in coastal and fresh waters and are found in most temperate regions. Some species (e.g. Geotria australis, Petromyzon marinus, and Entosphenus tridentatus) travel significant distances in the open ocean, as evidenced by their lack of reproductive isolation between populations. Other species are found in land-locked lakes. Their larvae (ammocoetes) have a low tolerance for high water temperatures, which may explain why they are not distributed in the tropics.

Lamprey distribution may be adversely affected by river habitat loss, overfishing, and pollution. In Britain at the time of the 11th-century Norman Conquest of England, lampreys were found as far upstream in the River Thames as Petersham. The reduction of pollution in the Thames and River Wear has led to recent sightings in London and Chester-le-Street.

Distribution of lampreys may also be adversely affected by dams and other construction projects due to disruption of migration routes and obstruction of access to spawning grounds. Conversely, the construction of artificial channels has exposed new habitats for colonisation, notably in North America, where sea lampreys have become a significant introduced pest in the Great Lakes. Active programs to control lampreys are undergoing modifications due to concerns of drinking-water quality in some areas.

== Biology ==
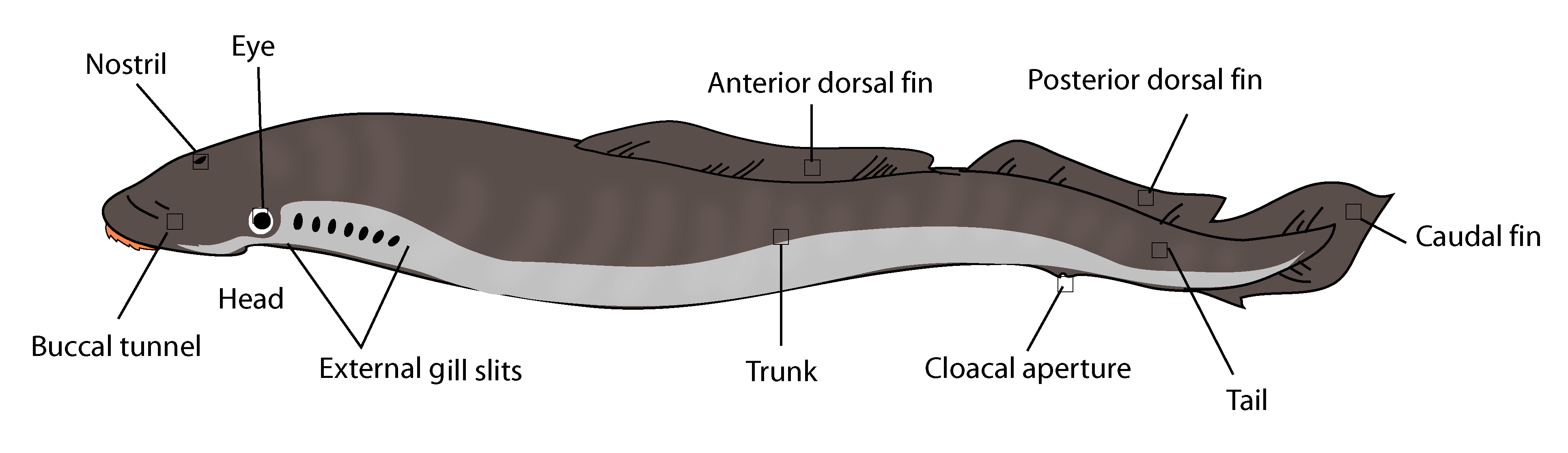
Basic external anatomy of a lamprey

=== Anatomy ===
Adults superficially resemble eels in that they have scaleless, elongated bodies, with the largest species, the sea lamprey, having a maximum body length around 1.2 m (3.9 ft). Lacking paired fins, adult lampreys have one nostril atop the head and seven gill pores on each side of the head.

The brain of the lamprey is divided into the telencephalon, diencephalon, midbrain, cerebellum, and medulla.

Lampreys have been described as the only living vertebrates to have four eyes, having a single pair of regular eyes and two parietal eyes, a pineal and parapineal one (the exception is members of Mordacia). The eyes of juvenile lampreys are poorly developed eyespot-like structures that are covered in translucent skin, while the eyes of adult lampreys are well developed. Accommodation is done by flattening the cornea, which pushes the lens towards the retina. The eye of family Mordaciidae possess just a single type of photoreceptor (rod-like), the family Petromyzontidae possess two photoreceptor types (a cone-like and a rod-like), and the family Geotriidae possesses five types of photoreceptors.

The buccal cavity, anterior to the gonads, is responsible for attaching the animal, through suction, to either a stone or its prey. This then allows the tongue to make contact with the stone to rasp algae or tear at the flesh of their prey to yield blood.

The last common ancestor of lampreys appears to have been specialized to feed on the blood and body fluids of other fish after metamorphosis. They attach their mouthparts to the target animal's body, then use three horny plates (laminae) on the tip of their piston-like tongues, one transversely and two longitudinally placed, to scrape through surface tissues until they reach body fluids. The teeth on their oral disc are primarily used to help the animal attach itself to its prey. Made of keratin and other proteins, lamprey teeth have a hollow core to give room for replacement teeth growing under the old ones. Some of the original blood-feeding forms have evolved into species that feed on both blood and flesh, and some have become specialized to eat flesh and may even invade the internal organs of the host. Tissue feeders can also involve the teeth on the oral disc in the excision of tissue. As a result, the flesh-feeders have smaller buccal glands as they do not require the production of anticoagulant continuously and mechanisms for preventing solid material entering the branchial pouches, which could otherwise potentially clog the gills. A study of the stomach content of some lampreys has shown the remains of intestines, fins, and vertebrae from their prey.

Close to the jaws of juvenile lampreys, a muscular, flap-like structure called the velum is present, which serves to generate a water current towards the mouth opening, which enables feeding and respiration.

The unique morphological characteristics of lampreys, such as their cartilaginous skeletons, suggest they are the sister taxon (see cladistics) of all living jawed vertebrates (gnathostomes). They are usually considered the most basal group of the Vertebrata. Instead of true vertebrae, they have a series of cartilaginous structures called arcualia arranged above the notochord. Hagfish, which resemble lampreys, have traditionally been considered the sister taxon of the true vertebrates (lampreys and gnathostomes) but DNA evidence suggests that they are in fact the sister taxon of lampreys.

The heart of the lamprey is anterior to the intestines. It contains the sinus, one atrium, and one ventricle protected by the pericardial cartilages.

The pineal eye, a photosensitive organ regulating melatonin production by capturing light signals through photoreceptor cells and converting them into intercellular signals, is located in the midline of its body and accompanied by the parapineal organ.

Key physical components to the lamprey are the intestines, which are located ventral to the notochord. Intestines aid in osmoregulation by taking in water from its environment and desalinating it to an iso-osmotic state with respect to blood, and are also responsible for digestion.

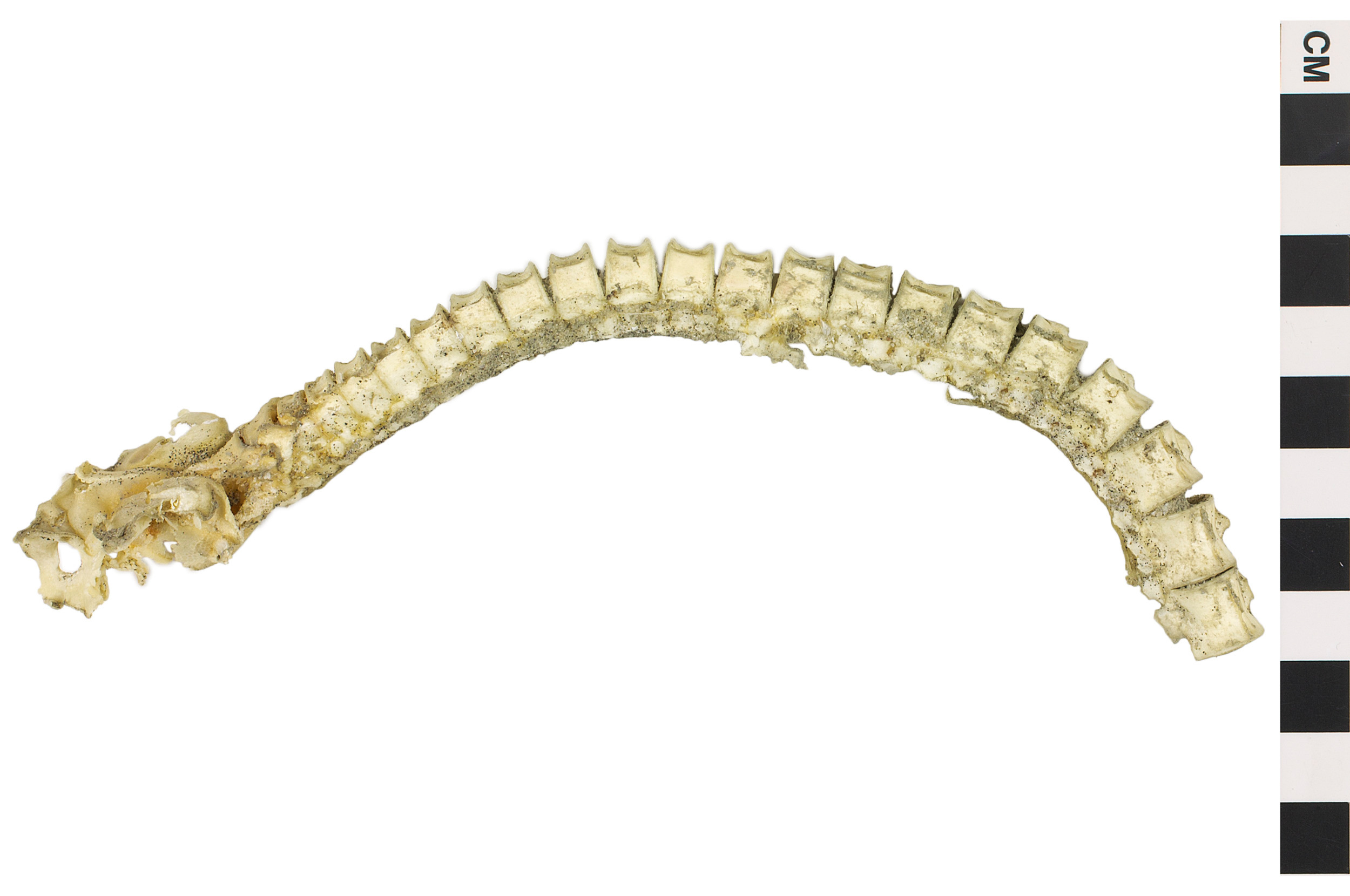
The cartilaginous skeleton of a lamprey washed up on a beach in North Carolina.

Lampreys are among the most energy-efficient swimmers. Their swimming movements generate low-pressure zones around the body, which pull rather than push their bodies through the water.

Different species of lampreys have many shared physical characteristics. The same anatomical structure can serve different functions in the lamprey depending on whether or not it is carnivorous. The mouth and suction capabilities of the lamprey not only allow it to cling to a fish as a parasite, but also provide it with limited climbing ability so that it can travel upstream and up ramps or rocks to breed. This ability has been studied in an attempt to better understand how lampreys battle the current and move forward despite only being able to hold onto the rock at a single point. Some scientists are also hoping to design ramps that will optimize the lamprey's climbing ability, as lampreys are valued as food in the Northwest United States and need to travel upstream to reproduce.

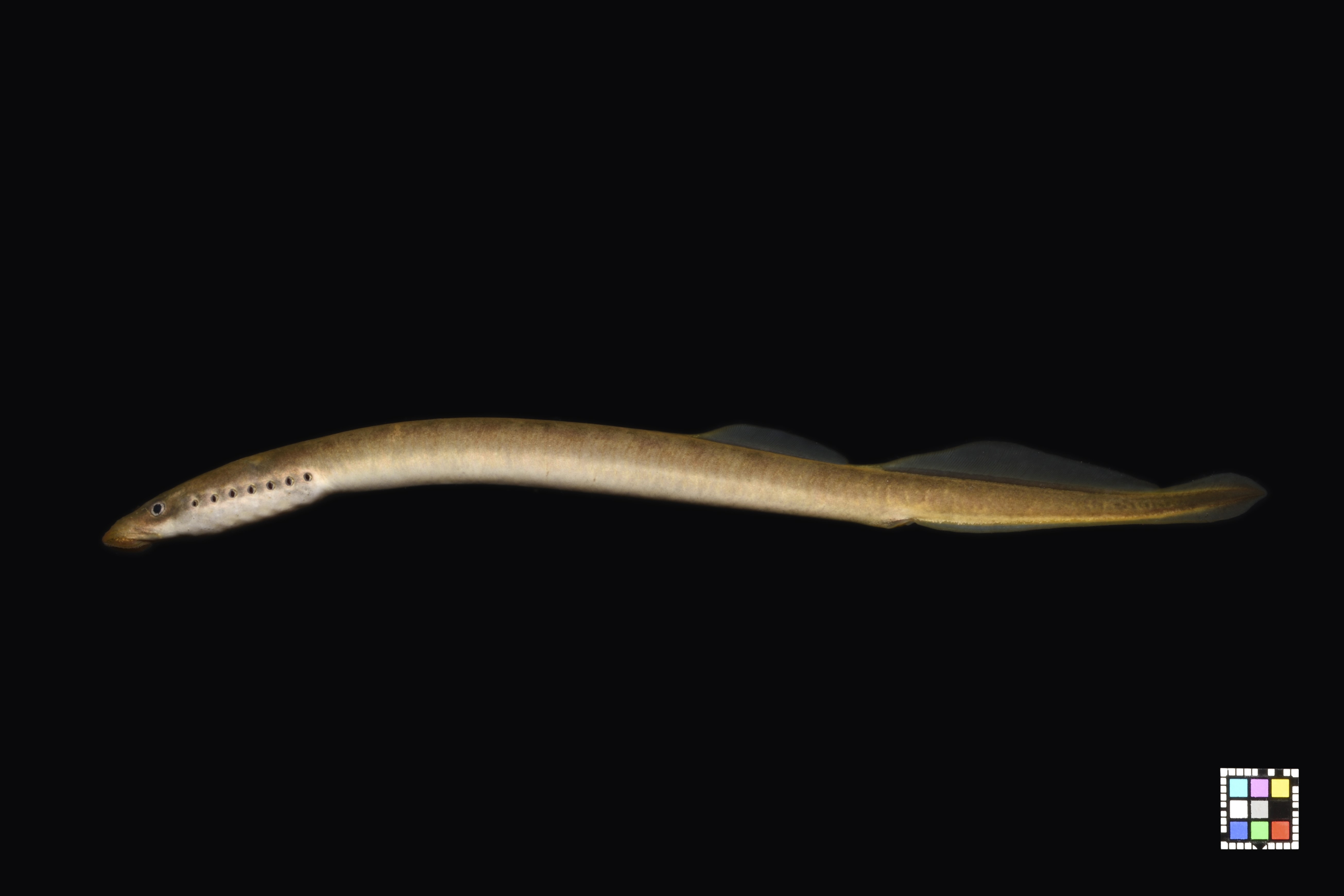
The lamprey's light-colored underside and darker back allow it to blend in when viewed from above or below, an example of countershading

Many lampreys exhibit countershading, a form of camouflage. Similarly to many other aquatic species, most lampreys have a dark-colored back, which enables them to blend in with the ground below when seen from above by a predator. Their light-colored undersides allow them to blend in with the bright air and water above them if a predator sees them from below.

Lamprey coloration can also vary according to the region and specific environment in which the species is found. Some species can be distinguished by their unique markings; for example, Geotria australis displays two bluish stripes running the length of its body as an adult. These markings can also sometimes be used to determine in what stage of the lifecycle the lamprey is; G. australis loses these stripes when it approaches the reproductive phase and begins to travel upstream. Another example is Petromyzon marinus, which shifts to more of an orange color as it reaches the reproductive stage in its lifecycle.

=== Genetics and immunology ===
Northern lampreys (Petromyzontidae) have the highest number of chromosomes (164–174) among vertebrates. Due to certain peculiarities in their adaptive immune systems, the study of lampreys provides valuable insight into the evolution of vertebrate adaptive immunity. Generated from a somatic recombination of leucine-rich repeat gene segments, lamprey leukocytes express surface variable lymphocyte receptors. This convergently evolved characteristic allows them to have lymphocytes that work as the T cells and B cells present in higher vertebrates' immune systems. Pouched lamprey (Geotria australis) larvae also have a very high tolerance for free iron in their bodies, and have well-developed biochemical systems for detoxification of the large quantities of these metal ions.

=== Lifecycle ===
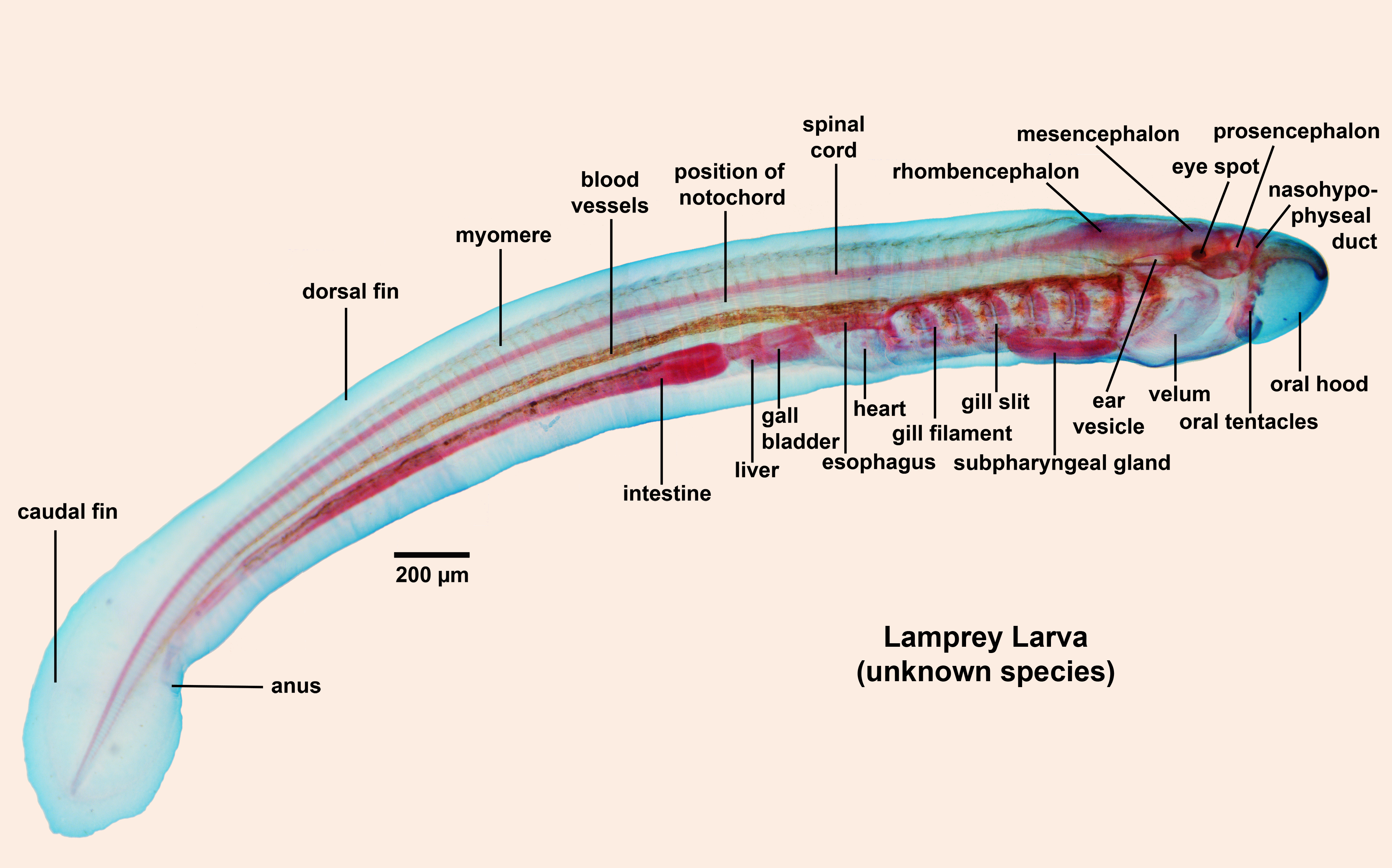
Larva of an unknown lamprey species

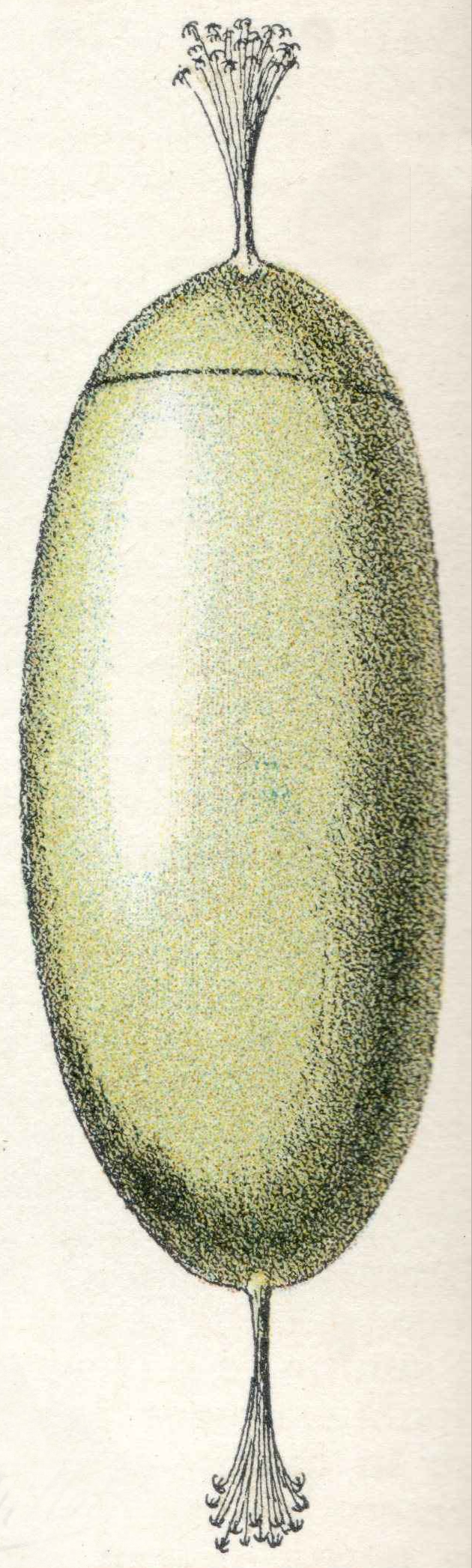
A hagfish egg, illustration by Adolphe Millot from Nouveau Larousse Illustré (1897-1904)

The adults spawn in nests of sand, gravel, and pebbles in clear streams. After hatching from the eggs, young larvae—called ammocoetes—will drift downstream with the current till they reach soft and fine sediment in silt beds, where they burrow in silt, mud, and detritus, taking up an existence as filter feeders, collecting detritus, algae, and micro-organisms. The eyes of the larvae are underdeveloped, but are capable of discriminating changes in illuminance. Ammocoetes can grow from 3–4 inches (8–10 centimetres) to about 8 inches (20 cm). Many species change color during a diurnal cycle, becoming dark at day and pale at night. The skin also has photoreceptors, light-sensitive cells, most of them concentrated in the tail, which helps them to stay buried. Lampreys may spend up to eight years as ammocoetes, while species such as the Arctic lamprey may only spend one to two years as larvae, prior to undergoing a metamorphosis which generally lasts 3–4 months, but can vary between species. While metamorphosing, they do not eat.

The rate of water moving across the ammocoetes' feeding apparatus is the lowest recorded in any suspension-feeding animal, and they therefore require water rich in nutrients to fulfill their nutritional needs. While the majority of (invertebrate) suspension feeders thrive in waters containing under 1 mg suspended organic solids per litre (<1 mg/l), ammocoetes demand minimum 4 mg/l, with concentrations in their habitats having been measured up to 40 mg/l.

During metamorphosis, the lamprey loses both the gallbladder and the biliary tract, and the endostyle turns into a thyroid gland.

Some species, including those that are not carnivorous and do not feed even following metamorphosis, live in fresh water for their entire lifecycle, spawning and dying shortly after metamorphosing. In contrast, many species are anadromous and migrate to the sea, beginning to prey on other animals while still swimming downstream after their metamorphosis provides them with eyes, teeth, and a sucking mouth. Those that are anadromous are carnivorous, feeding on fishes or marine mammals.

Anadromous lampreys spend up to four years in the sea before migrating back to fresh water, where they spawn. Adults create nests (called redds) by moving rocks, and females release thousands of eggs, sometimes up to 100,000. The male, intertwined with the female, fertilizes the eggs simultaneously. Being semelparous, both adults die after the eggs are fertilized.

Sexually mature males use a specialized heat-producing tissue in the form of a ridge of fat cells near the anterior dorsal fin to stimulate females. After having attracted a female with pheromones, the heat detected by the female through body contact encourages spawning.

== Classification ==
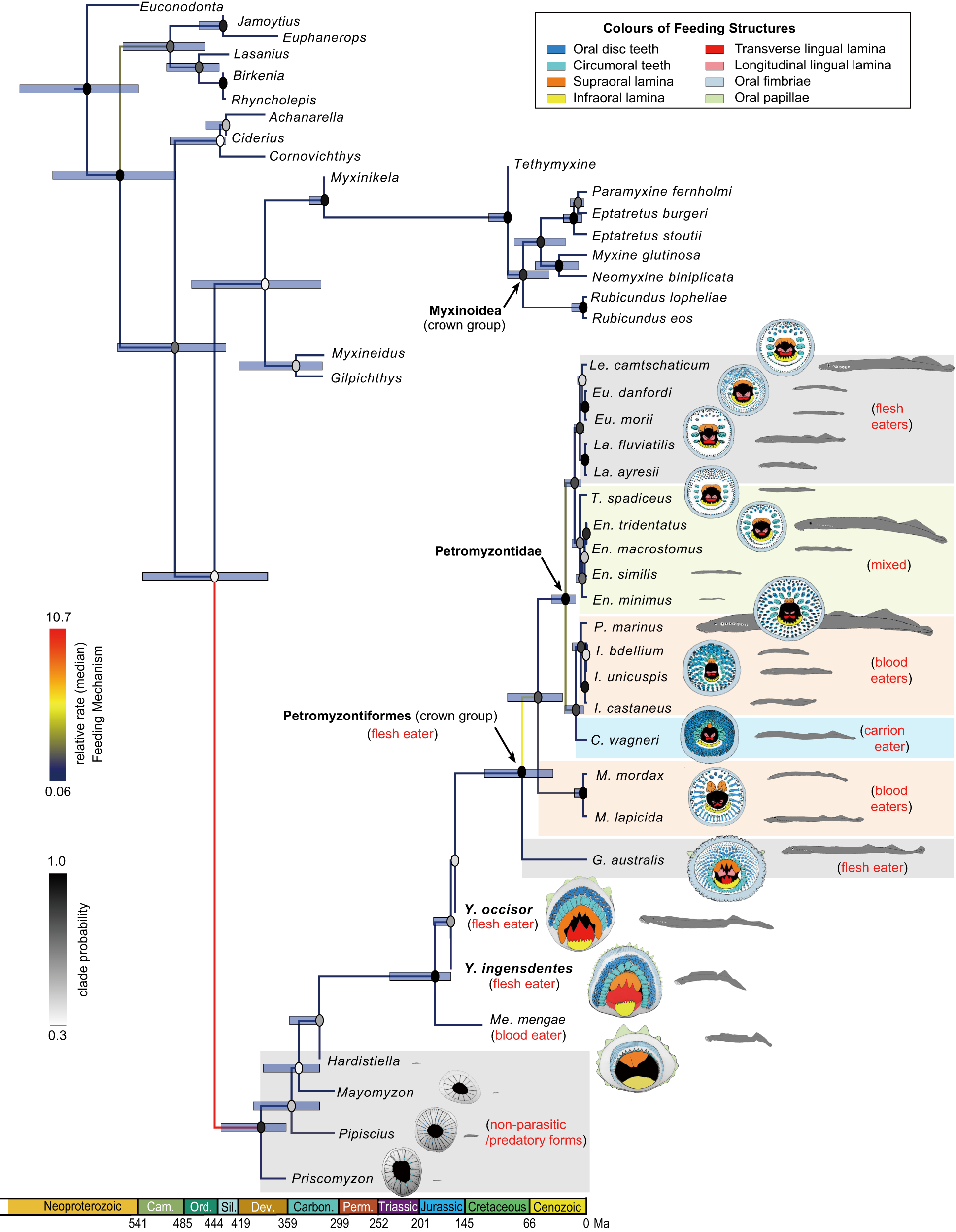
Phylogeny including extinct taxa, with a younger divergence date estimate

Taxonomists place lampreys and hagfish in the subphylum Vertebrata of the phylum Chordata, which also includes the invertebrate subphyla Tunicata (sea-squirts) and the fish-like Cephalochordata (lancelets or Amphioxus). Recent molecular and morphological phylogenetic studies place lampreys and hagfish in the infraphylum Agnatha or Agnathostomata (both meaning without jaws). The other vertebrate infraphylum is Gnathostomata (jawed mouths) and includes the classes Chondrichthyes (sharks), Osteichthyes (bony fishes), Amphibia, Reptilia, Aves, and Mammalia.

Some researchers have classified lampreys as the sole surviving representatives of the Linnean class Cephalaspidomorphi. Cephalaspidomorpha is sometimes given as a subclass of the Cephalaspidomorphi. Fossil evidence now suggests lampreys and cephalaspids acquired their shared characters by convergent evolution. The 5th edition of Fishes of the World classifies lampreys within the Class Petromyzontida, a taxon called Petromyzonti in Eschmeyer's Catalog of Fishes.

The debate about their systematics notwithstanding, lampreys constitute a single order Petromyzontiformes. Sometimes still seen is the alternative spelling "Petromyzoniformes", based on the argument that the type genus is Petromyzon and not "Petromyzonta" or similar. Throughout most of the 20th century, both names were used indiscriminately, even by the same author in subsequent publications. In the mid-1970s, the ICZN was called upon to fix one name or the other, and after much debate, had to resolve the issue by voting. Thus, in 1980, the spelling with a "t" won out, and in 1981, all higher-level taxa based on Petromyzon officially have to start with "Petromyzont-".

Phylogeny based on Brownstein & Near, 2023.

- Petromyzontiformes
  - - Geotriidae
      Geotria Gray 1851 (pouched lampreys)
    - Mordaciidae
      Mordacia Gray 1853 (southern topeyed lampreys)
  - Petromyzontidae
    - - Petromyzontinae
        - Caspiomyzon Berg 1906
        - - Petromyzon Linnaeus 1758 (Sea lamprey)
          - Ichthyomyzon Girard 1858
      - Lampetrinae
        - Entosphenini
          - Entosphenus Gill 1863
          - Tetrapleurodon Creaser & Hubbs 1922 (Mexican lampreys)
        - Lampetrini
          - Western American "Lampetra"
          - - Lethenteron Creaser & Hubbs 1922
            - - Eudontomyzon Regan 1911
              - Lampetra sensu stricto Bonnaterre 1788 (Eastern American and European Lampetra)

List of species, from FishBase in 2023. Click "show" to expand.
- Geotria australis Gray 1851 (Pouched lamprey)
- Geotria macrostoma (Burmeister 1868) (Argentinian lamprey)
- Mordacia lapicida (Gray 1851) (Chilean lamprey)
- Mordacia mordax (Richardson 1846) (Australian lamprey)
- Mordacia praecox Potter 1968 (Non-parasitic/Australian brook lamprey)
- Petromyzon marinus Linnaeus 1758 (Sea lamprey)
- Ichthyomyzon bdellium (Jordan 1885) (Ohio lamprey)
- Ichthyomyzon castaneus Girard 1858 (Chestnut lamprey)
- Ichthyomyzon fossor Reighard & Cummins 1916 (Northern brook lamprey)
- Ichthyomyzon gagei Hubbs & Trautman 1937 (Southern brook lamprey)
- Ichthyomyzon greeleyi Hubbs & Trautman 1937 (Mountain brook lamprey)
- Ichthyomyzon unicuspis Hubbs & Trautman 1937 (Silver lamprey)
- Caspiomyzon wagneri (Kessler 1870) Berg 1906 (Caspian lamprey)
- Caspiomyzon graecus (Renaud & Economidis 2010) (Ionian brook lamprey)
- Caspiomyzon hellenicus (Vladykov et al. 1982) (Greek lamprey)
- Tetrapleurodon geminis Álvarez 1964 (Mexican brook lamprey)
- Tetrapleurodon spadiceus (Bean 1887) (Mexican lamprey)
- Entosphenus folletti Vladykov & Kott 1976 (Northern California brook lamprey)
- Entosphenus lethophagus (Hubbs 1971) (Pit-Klamath brook lamprey)
- Entosphenus macrostomus (Beamish 1982) (Lake lamprey)
- Entosphenus minimus (Bond & Kan 1973) (Miller Lake lamprey)
- Entosphenus similis Vladykov & Kott 1979 (Klamath river lamprey)
- Entosphenus tridentatus (Richardson 1836) (Pacific lamprey)
- Lethenteron alaskense Vladykov & Kott 1978 (Alaskan brook lamprey)
- Lethenteron appendix (DeKay 1842) (American brook lamprey)
- Lethenteron camtschaticum (Tilesius 1811) (Arctic lamprey)
- Lethenteron kessleri (Anikin 1905) (Siberian brook lamprey)
- Lethenteron ninae Naseka, Tuniyev & Renaud 2009 (Western Transcaucasian lamprey)
- Lethenteron reissneri (Dybowski 1869) (Far Eastern brook lamprey)
- Lethenteron zanandreai (Vladykov 1955) (Lombardy lamprey)
- Eudontomyzon stankokaramani (Karaman 1974) (Drin brook lamprey)
- Eudontomyzon morii (Berg 1931) (Korean lamprey)
- Eudontomyzon danfordi Regan 1911 (Carpathian brook lamprey)
- Eudontomyzon mariae (Berg 1931) (Ukrainian brook lamprey)
- Eudontomyzon vladykovi (Oliva & Zanandrea 1959) (Vladykov's lamprey)
- Lampetra aepyptera (Abbott 1860) (Least brook lamprey)
- Lampetra alavariensis Mateus et al. 2013 (Portuguese lamprey)
- Lampetra auremensis Mateus et al. 2013 (Qurem lamprey)
- Lampetra ayresi (Günther 1870) (Western river lamprey)
- Lampetra fluviatilis (Linnaeus 1758) (European river lamprey)
- Lampetra hubbsi (Vladykov & Kott 1976) (Kern brook lamprey)
- Lampetra lanceolata Kux & Steiner 1972 (Turkish brook lamprey)
- Lampetra lusitanica Mateus et al. 2013 (lusitanic lamprey)
- Lampetra pacifica Vladykov 1973 (Pacific brook lamprey)
- Lampetra planeri (Bloch 1784) (European brook lamprey)
- Lampetra richardsoni Vladykov & Follett 1965 (Western brook lamprey)
- Entosphenus macrostomus Dr. Dick Beamish 1980 (Cowichan lake lamprey)

Recent studies differ regarding the timing of the last common ancestor of all living lampreys, with some suggesting a Middle Jurassic date, around 175 million years ago, while other studies have suggested a younger split, dating to the Late Cretaceous. The older date study posited that the Northern and Southern Hemisphere lampreys diverged as part of the breakup of Pangea, while the Late Cretaceous study suggested that modern lampreys emerged in the Southern Hemisphere. It is thought that most modern lamprey diversity emerged during the Cenozoic, particularly within the last 10–20 million years.

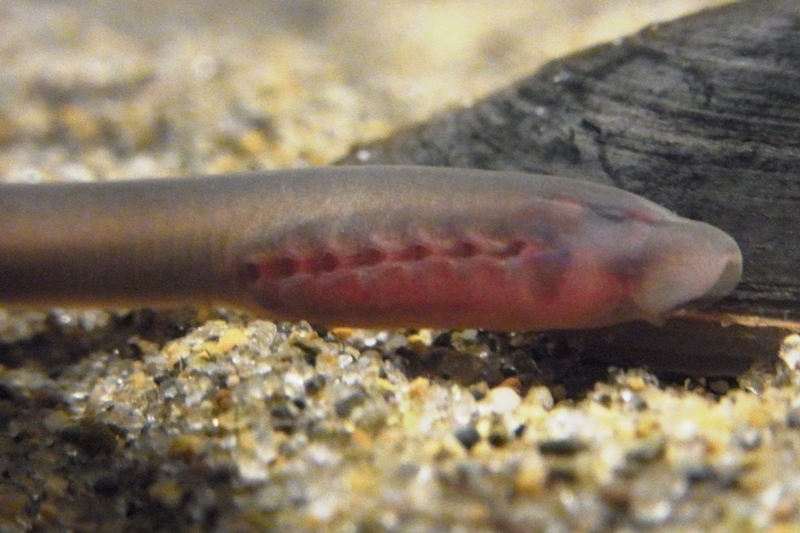
Ammocoetes larva of Lethenteron reissneri

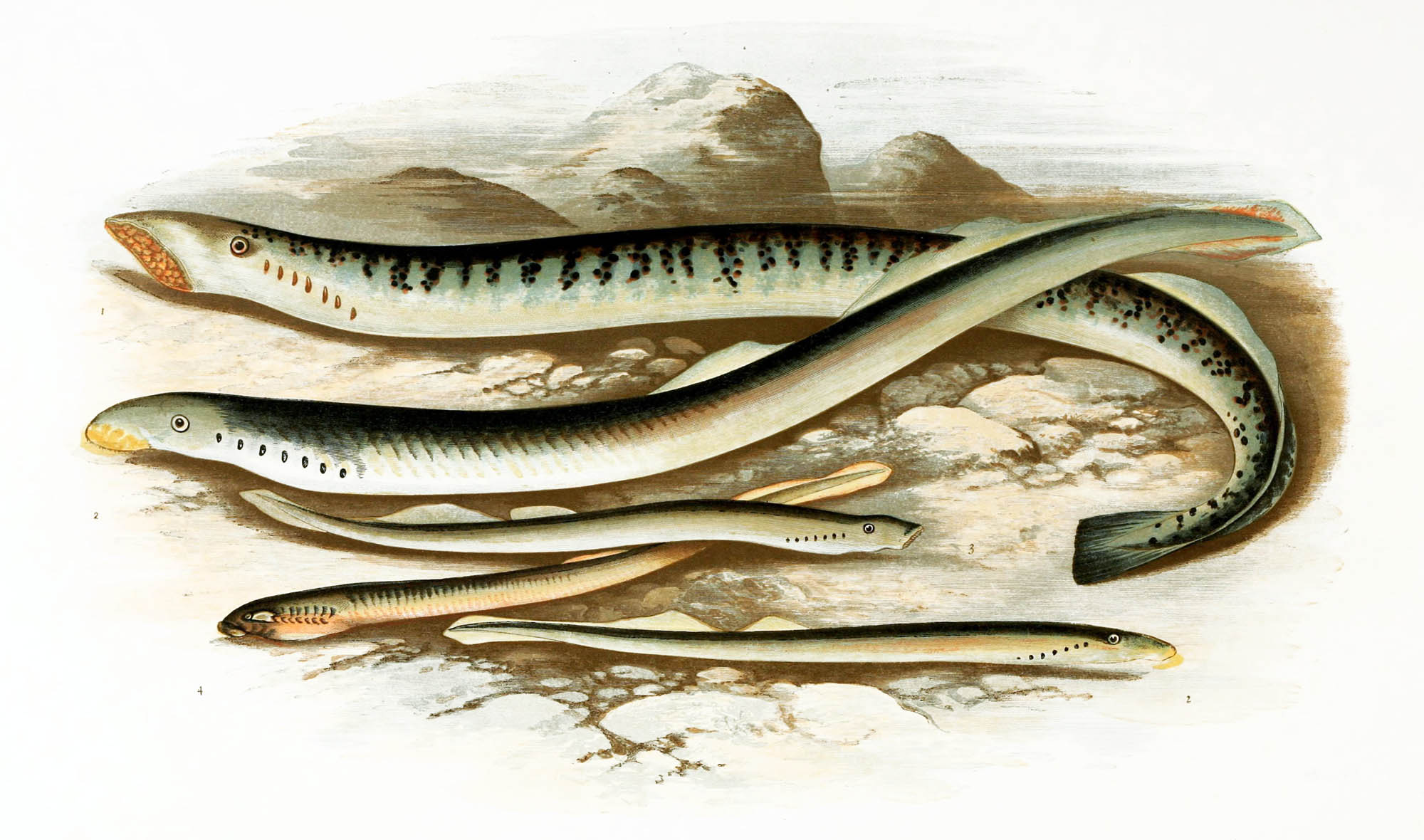
Several species of European lampreys

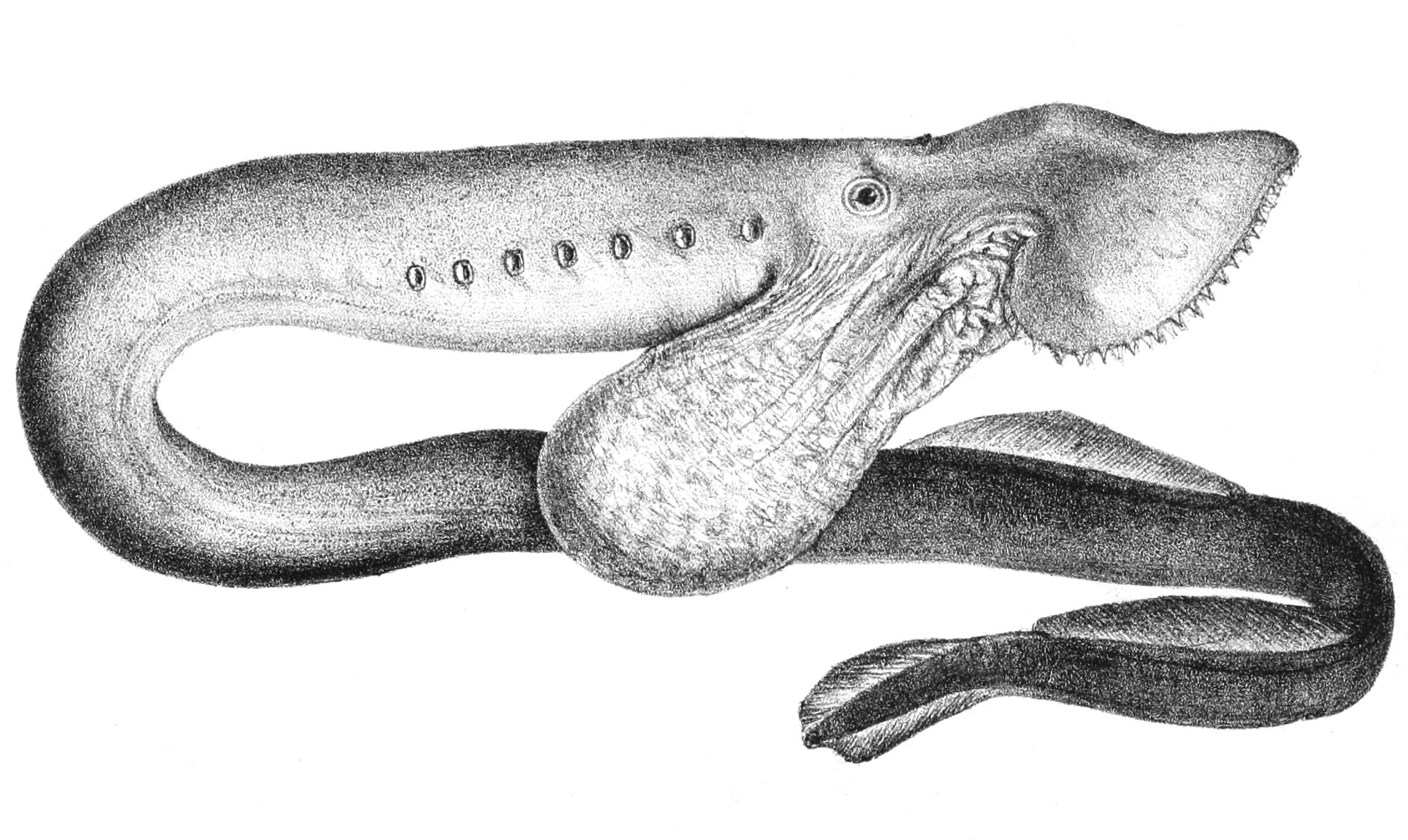
Pouched lamprey

== Fossil record ==
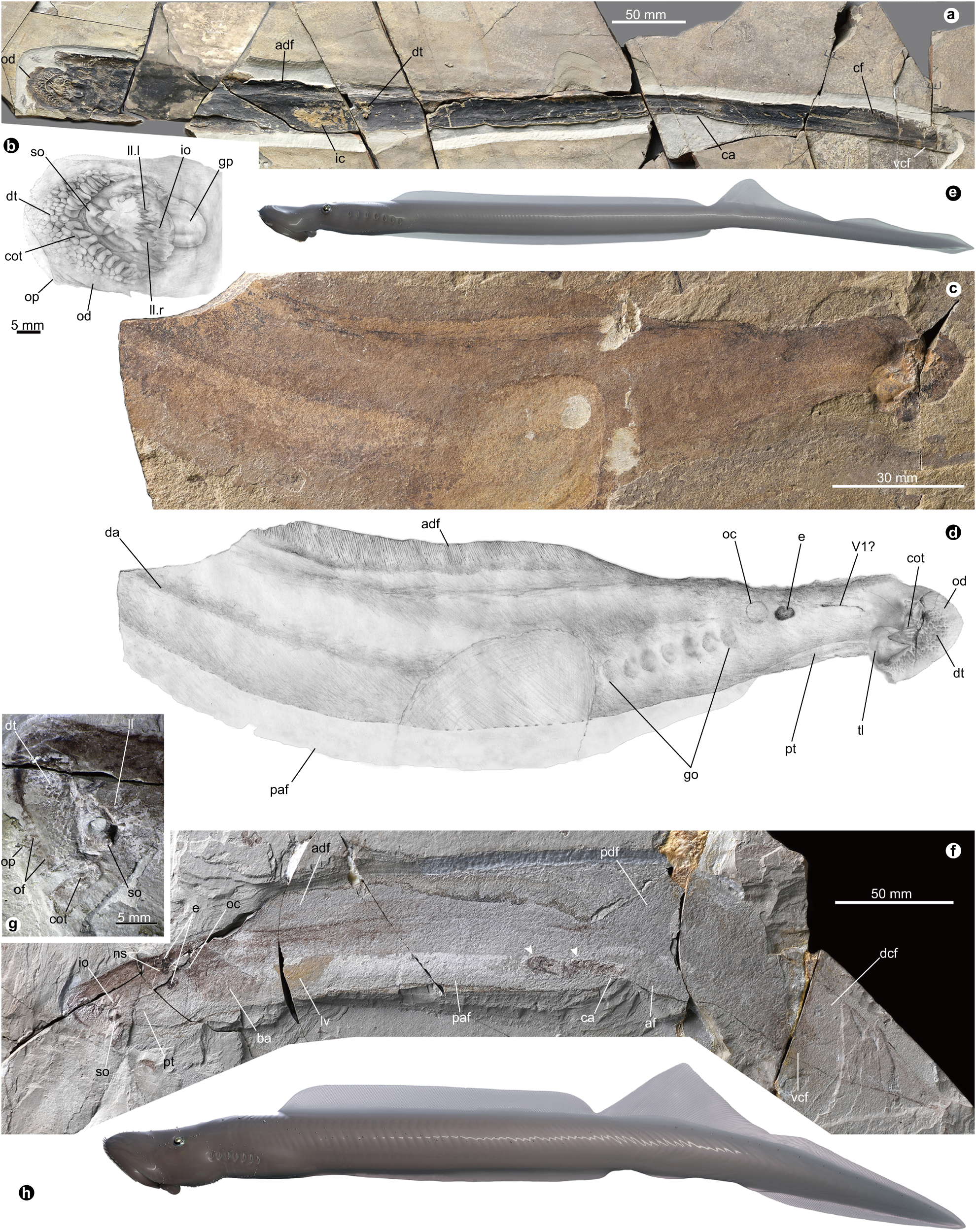
Fossils of Yanliaomyzon from the Middle Jurassic of China

The oldest fossil lamprey, Priscomyzon, is known from the latest Devonian of South Africa around 360 million years ago, with other stem-group lampreys, like Pipiscius, Mayomyzon and Hardistiella known from the Carboniferous of North America. These Paleozoic stem-lampreys are small relative to modern lampreys, and while they had well developed oral discs with a small number of radially arranged teeth, they lacked the specialised, heavily toothed discs with plate-like laminae present in modern lampreys, and it is possible that they fed by scraping algae off of animals, rather than feeding by predation/parasitism. They also lacked the modern three stage life cycle including ammocoetes found in modern lampreys, with the juvenile stages of these species closely resembling adults. Myxineidus from the Carboniferous of France, often considered to be a hagfish, has been found to be a lamprey in some studies. The earliest lamprey with the specialised toothed oral disc typical of modern lampreys is Yanliaomyzon from the Middle Jurassic of China around 163 million years old, which is thought to have had a predatory lifestyle like modern lampreys, and probably had a three stage life cycle including ammocoetes. Mesomyzon from the Early Cretaceous of China, which displays the three stage life cycle with ammocoetes, was found in one study to be more closely related to the family Petromyzonidae than to other living lampreys, though other studies have found it to be outside the group containing all living lampreys.

== Lamprey and chordate synapomorphies ==
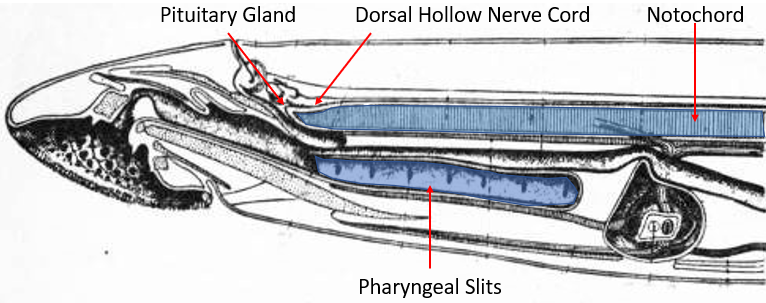
Lampreys are a part of the vertebrate group Cyclostomatous. The above illustration labels chordate synapomorphies found in lampreys. The notochord, dorsal hollow nerve cord, pituitary gland, pharyngeal slits, and post-anal tail (not depicted above) are all found in the lamprey.

Synapomorphies are certain characteristics that are shared over evolutionary history. Organisms possessing a notochord, a dorsal hollow nerve cord, pharyngeal slits, a pituitary gland/endostyle, and a post-anal tail during the process of their development are considered to be chordates. Lampreys contain these characteristics that define them as chordates. Lamprey anatomy is very different based on what stage of development they are in. The notochord is derived from the mesoderm and is one of the defining characteristics of a chordate. The notochord provides signaling and mechanical cues to help the organism when swimming. The dorsal nerve cord is another characteristic of lampreys that defines them as chordates. During development this part of the ectoderm rolls creating a hollow tube. This is often why it is referred to as the dorsal "hollow" nerve cord. The third chordate feature, which are the pharyngeal slits, are openings found between the pharynx or throat. Pharyngeal slits are filter feeding organs that help the movement of water through the mouth and out of these slits when feeding. During the lamprey's larval stage they feed by filter feeding. Once lampreys reach their adult phase they become parasitic on other fish, and these gill slits become very important in aiding in the respiration of the organism. The final chordate synapomorphy is the post anal-tail, which is muscular and extends behind the anus.

Oftentimes adult amphioxus and lamprey larvae are compared by anatomists due to their similarities. Similarities between adult amphioxus and lamprey larvae include a pharynx with pharyngeal slits, a notochord, a dorsal hollow nerve cord and a series of somites that extend anterior to the otic vesicle.

== Use in research ==
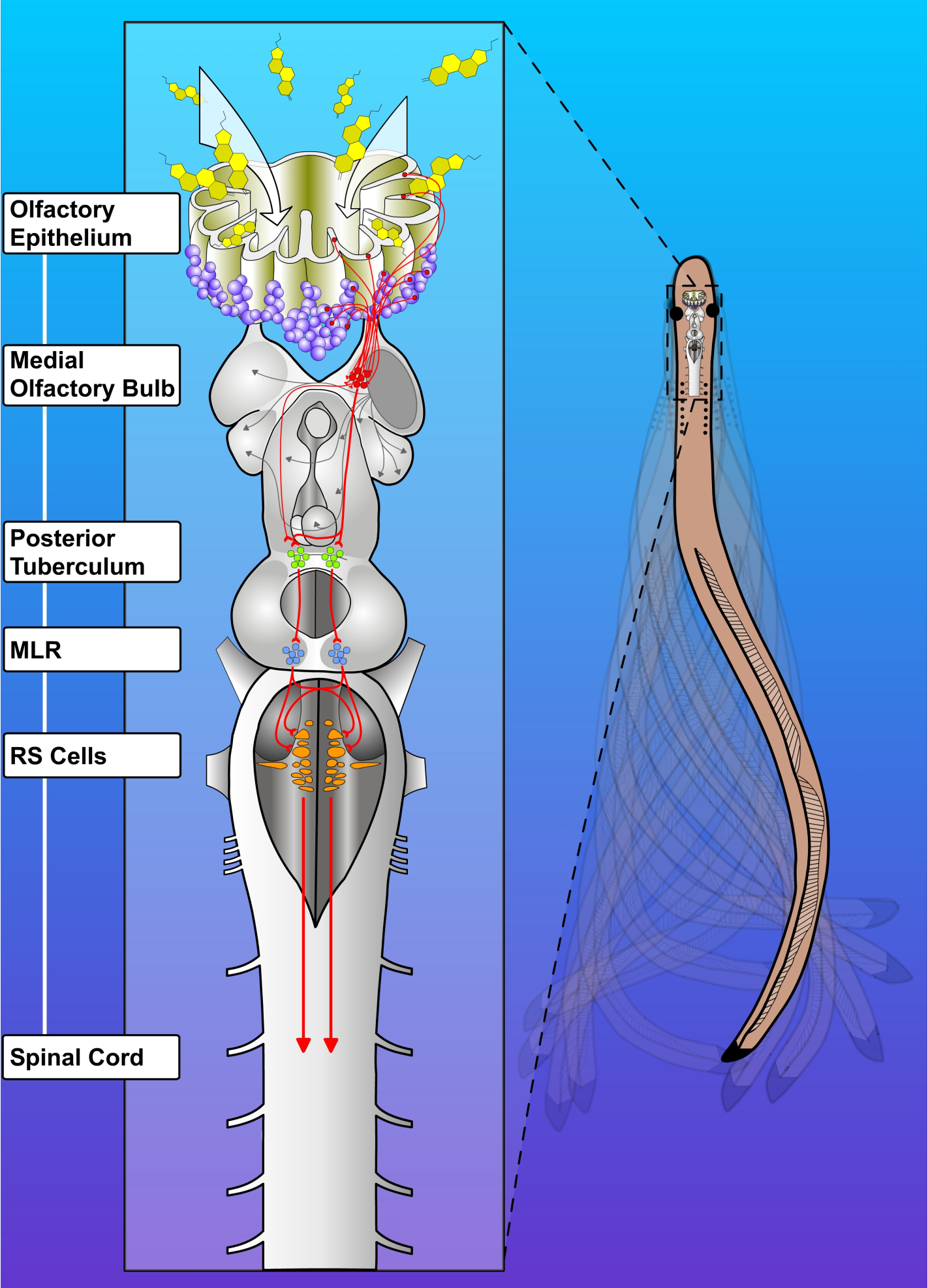
Stimulation of the olfactory sensory neurons in the periphery activates neurons in the olfactory bulb of a sea lamprey

The lamprey has been extensively studied because its relatively simple brain is thought in many respects to reflect the brain structure of early vertebrate ancestors. Beginning in the 1970s, Sten Grillner and his colleagues at the Karolinska Institute in Stockholm followed on from extensive work on the lamprey started by Carl Rovainen in the 1960s that used the lamprey as a model system to work out the fundamental principles of motor control in vertebrates starting in the spinal cord and working toward the brain.

In a series of studies by Rovainen and his student James Buchanan, the cells that formed the neural circuits within the spinal cord capable of generating the rhythmic motor patterns that underlie swimming were examined. Note that there are still missing details in the network scheme despite claims by Grillner that the network is characterised (Parker 2006, 2010). Spinal cord circuits are controlled by specific locomotor areas in the brainstem and midbrain, and these areas are in turn controlled by higher brain structures, including the basal ganglia and tectum.

In a study of the lamprey tectum published in 2007, they found electrical stimulation could elicit eye movements, lateral bending movements, or swimming activity, and the type, amplitude, and direction of movement varied as a function of the location within the tectum that was stimulated. These findings were interpreted as consistent with the idea that the tectum generates goal-directed locomotion in the lamprey.

Lampreys are used as a model organism in biomedical research, where their large reticulospinal axons are used to investigate synaptic transmission. The axons of lamprey are particularly large and allow for microinjection of substances for experimental manipulation.

They are also capable of full functional recovery after complete spinal cord transection. Another trait is the ability to delete several genes from their somatic cell lineages, about 20% of their DNA, which are vital during development of the embryo, but which in humans can cause problems such as cancer later in life, after they have served their purpose. How the genes destined for deletion are targeted is not yet known.

== Relationship with humans ==
=== Attacks on humans ===
Although attacks on humans have been documented, they will generally not attack humans unless starved.

=== As food ===
People have long eaten lampreys. They were highly appreciated by the ancient Romans. During the Middle Ages they were widely eaten by the upper classes throughout Europe, especially during Lent, when eating meat was prohibited, due to their meaty taste and texture. King Henry I of England is claimed to have been so fond of lampreys that he often ate them, late into life and poor health, against the advice of his physician concerning their richness, and is said to have died from eating "a surfeit of lampreys". Whether or not his lamprey indulgence actually caused his death is unclear, but the phrase persists in British culture.

A lamprey pie was made for the coronation of Elizabeth II in 1953. Sixty years later, the city of Gloucester had to use fish from North America for her Diamond Jubilee, because few lampreys could be found in the River Severn.

In southwestern Europe (Portugal, Spain, and France), Finland and in Latvia (where lamprey is routinely sold in supermarkets), lampreys are a highly prized delicacy. In Finland (county of Nakkila), and Latvia (Carnikava Municipality), the river lamprey is the local symbol, found on their coats of arms. In 2015 the lamprey from Carnikava was included in the Protected designation of origin list by the European Commission.

Sea lamprey is the most sought-after species in Portugal and one of only two that can legally bear the commercial name "lamprey" (lampreia): the other one being Lampetra fluviatilis, the European river lamprey, both according to Portaria (Government regulation no. 587/2006, from 22 June). "Arroz de lampreia" (lamprey rice) and "Lampreia à Bordalesa" (Bordeaux style lamprey) are some of the most important dishes in Portuguese cuisine.

Lampreys are also consumed in Sweden, Russia, Lithuania, Estonia, Japan, and South Korea. In Finland, they are commonly eaten grilled or smoked, but also pickled, or in vinegar.

The mucus and serum of several lamprey species, including the Caspian lamprey (Caspiomyzon wagneri), river lampreys (Lampetra fluviatilis and L. planeri), and sea lamprey (Petromyzon marinus), are known to be toxic, and require thorough cleaning before cooking and consumption.

In Britain, lampreys are commonly used as bait, normally as dead bait. Northern pike, perch, and chub all can be caught on lampreys. Frozen lampreys can be bought from most bait and tackle shops.

Indigenous American tribes of the Pacific Northwest have traditionally fished the Pacific lamprey (Entosphenus tridentatus).

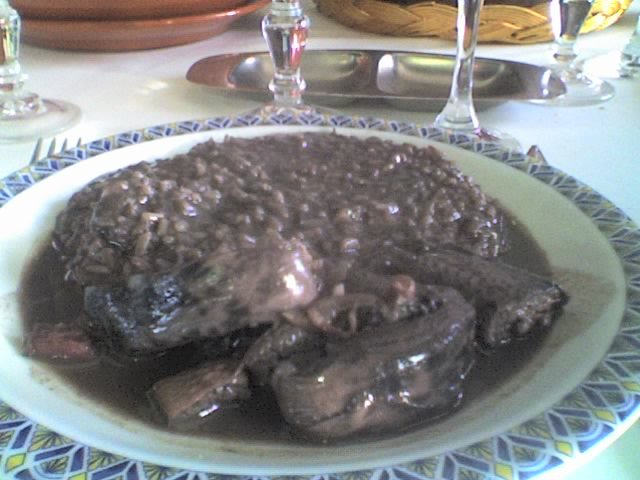
Portuguese lamprey rice

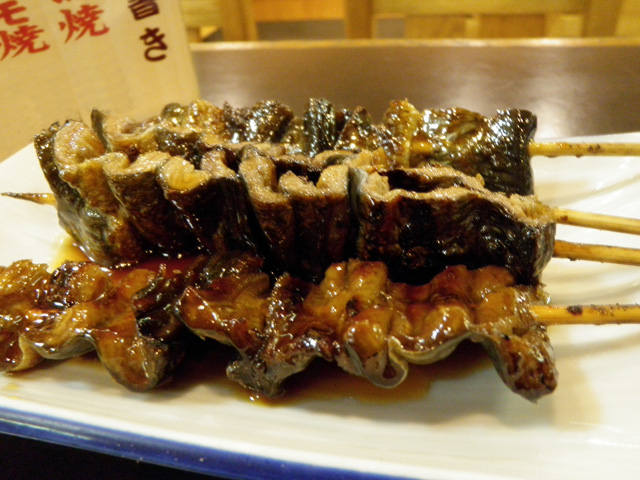
Yatsume kabayaki in Japan

The European river lamprey in the coat of arms of Nakkila, Finland. Lampreys are a traditional delicacy in locality.

=== As pests ===
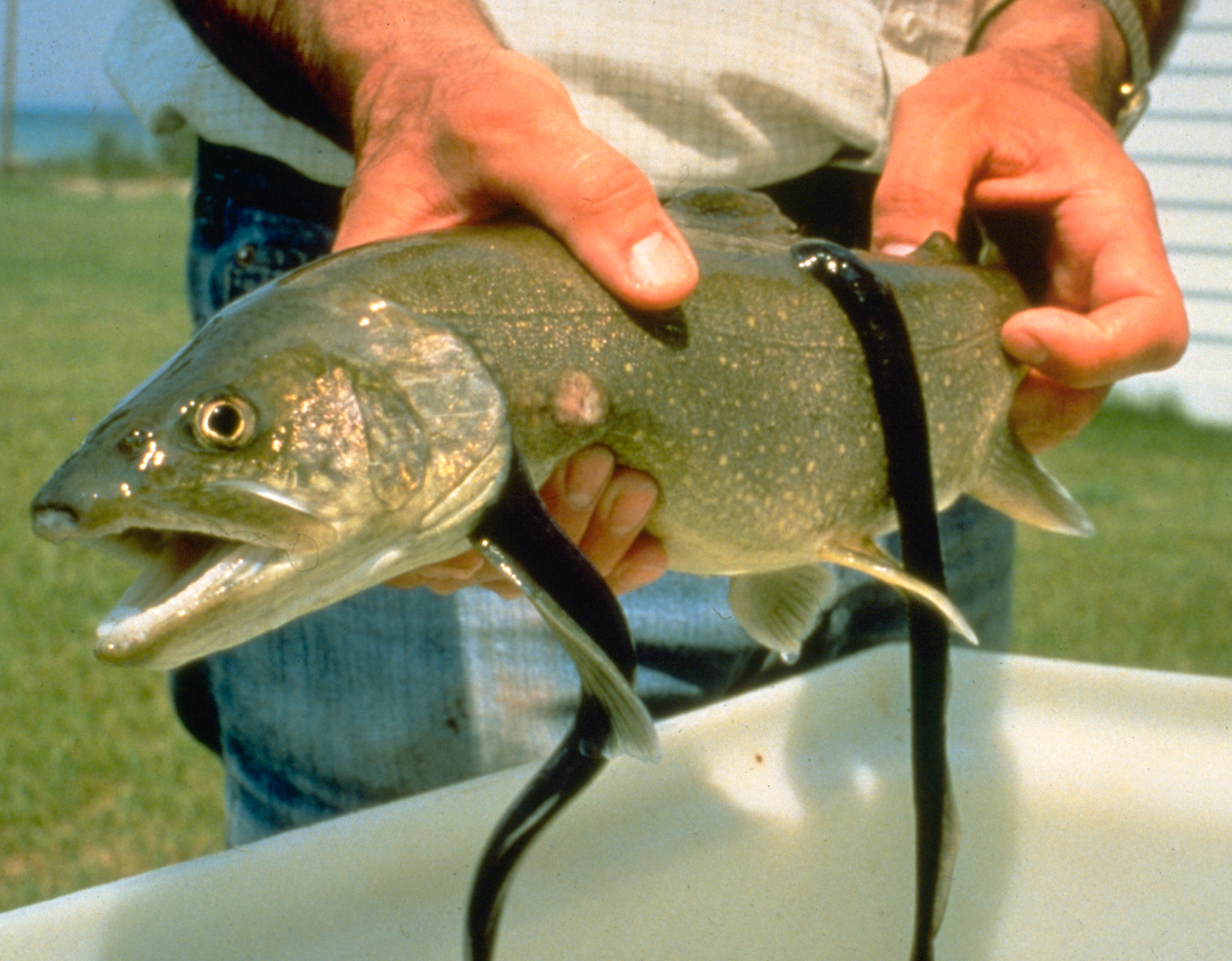
Lampreys attached to a lake trout.

Sea lampreys have become a major pest in the North American Great Lakes. It is generally believed that they gained access to the lakes via canals during the early 20th century, but this theory is controversial. They are considered an invasive species, have no natural predators in the lakes, and prey on many species of commercial value, such as lake trout.

Lampreys are now found mostly in the streams that feed the lakes, and are controlled with special barriers to prevent the upstream movement of adults, or by the application of toxicants called lampricides, which are harmless to most other aquatic species; however, these programs are complicated and expensive, and do not eradicate the lampreys from the lakes, but merely keep them in check.

New programs are being developed, including the use of chemically sterilized male lampreys in a method akin to the sterile insect technique. Finally, pheromones critical to lamprey migratory behaviour have been isolated, their chemical structures determined, and their impact on lamprey behaviour studied, in the laboratory and in the wild, and active efforts are underway to chemically source and to address regulatory considerations that might allow this strategy to proceed.

Control of sea lampreys in the Great Lakes is conducted by the U.S. Fish and Wildlife Service and the Canadian Department of Fisheries and Oceans, and is coordinated by the Great Lakes Fishery Commission. Lake Champlain, bordered by New York, Vermont, and Quebec, and New York's Finger Lakes are also home to high populations of sea lampreys that warrant control. Lake Champlain's lamprey control program is managed by the New York State Department of Environmental Conservation, the Vermont Department of Fish and Wildlife, and the U.S. Fish and Wildlife Service. New York's Finger Lakes sea lamprey control program is managed solely by the New York State Department of Environmental Conservation.

=== In folklore ===
In folklore, lampreys are called "nine-eyed eels". The name derives from misconstruing the seven gill pores behind each eye as additional eyes, and doing the same with the nostril on the top of the head (even though there is only one of those, not one per side). Likewise, in the German language, the word for lamprey is Neunauge, which means "nine-eye". In British folklore, the monster known as the Lambton Worm may have been based on a lamprey, since it is described as an eel-like creature with nine eyes.

In Japanese, lamprey are called yatsume-unagi (八つ目鰻, "eight-eyed eels"), thus excluding the nostril from the count.

=== In literature ===
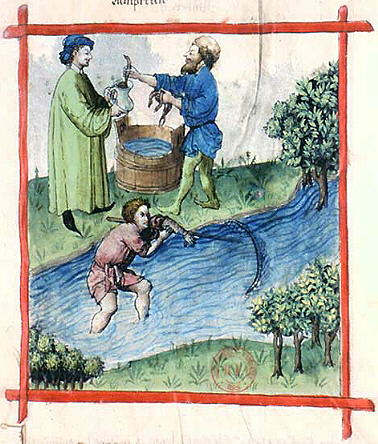
Illustration from an edition of Tacuinum Sanitatis, 15th century

Vedius Pollio kept a pool of lampreys into which slaves who incurred his displeasure would be thrown as food. On one occasion, Vedius was punished by Augustus for attempting to do so in his presence:

... one of his slaves had broken a crystal cup. Vedius ordered him to be seized and then put to death, but in an unusual way. He ordered him to be thrown to the huge lampreys which he had in his fish pond. Who would not think he did this for display? Yet it was out of cruelty. The boy slipped from the captor's hands and fled to Augustus's feet asking nothing else other than a different way to die – he did not want to be eaten. Augustus was moved by the novelty of the cruelty and ordered him to be released, all the crystal cups to be broken before his eyes, and the fish pond to be filled in ...

— Seneca, On Anger, III, 40

This incident was incorporated into the plot of the 2003 novel Pompeii by Robert Harris in the incident of Ampliatus feeding a slave to his lampreys.

Lucius Licinius Crassus was mocked by Gnaeus Domitius Ahenobarbus (cos. 54 BC) for weeping over the death of his pet lamprey:

So, when Domitius said to Crassus the orator, Did not you weep for the death of the lamprey you kept in your fish pond? – Did not you, said Crassus to him again, bury three wives without ever shedding a tear? – Plutarch, On the Intelligence of Animals, 976a

This story is also found in Aelian (Various Histories VII, 4) and Macrobius (Saturnalia III.15.3). It is included by Hugo von Hofmannsthal in the Chandos Letter:

And in my mind I compare myself from time to time with the orator Crassus, of whom it is reported that he grew so excessively enamoured of a tame lamprey – a dumb, apathetic, red-eyed fish in his ornamental pond – that it became the talk of the town; and when one day in the Senate Domitius reproached him for having shed tears over the death of this fish, attempting thereby to make him appear a fool, Crassus answered, "Thus have I done over the death of my fish as you have over the death of neither your first nor your second wife." I know not how oft this Crassus with his lamprey enters my mind as a mirrored image of my Self, reflected across the abyss of centuries.

— Philip, Lord Chandos, (fictional) younger son of the Earl of Bath, in a letter to Francis Bacon

In George R. R. Martin's novel series, A Song of Ice and Fire, Lord Wyman Manderly is mockingly called "Lord Lamprey" by his enemies in reference to his rumored affinity to lamprey pie and his striking obesity.

Kurt Vonnegut, in his late short story "The Big Space Fuck", posits a future America so heavily polluted – "Everything had turned to shit and beer cans", in his words – that the Great Lakes have been infested with a species of massive, man-eating ambulatory lampreys.

=== In television ===
In season 3, episode 5 of The Borgias, whilst out on a hunting trip, Cesare Borgia's mercenary, Micheletto, kills the King of Naples by pushing him into a pool filled with lampreys that King Ferrante had built during his reign of Naples.
