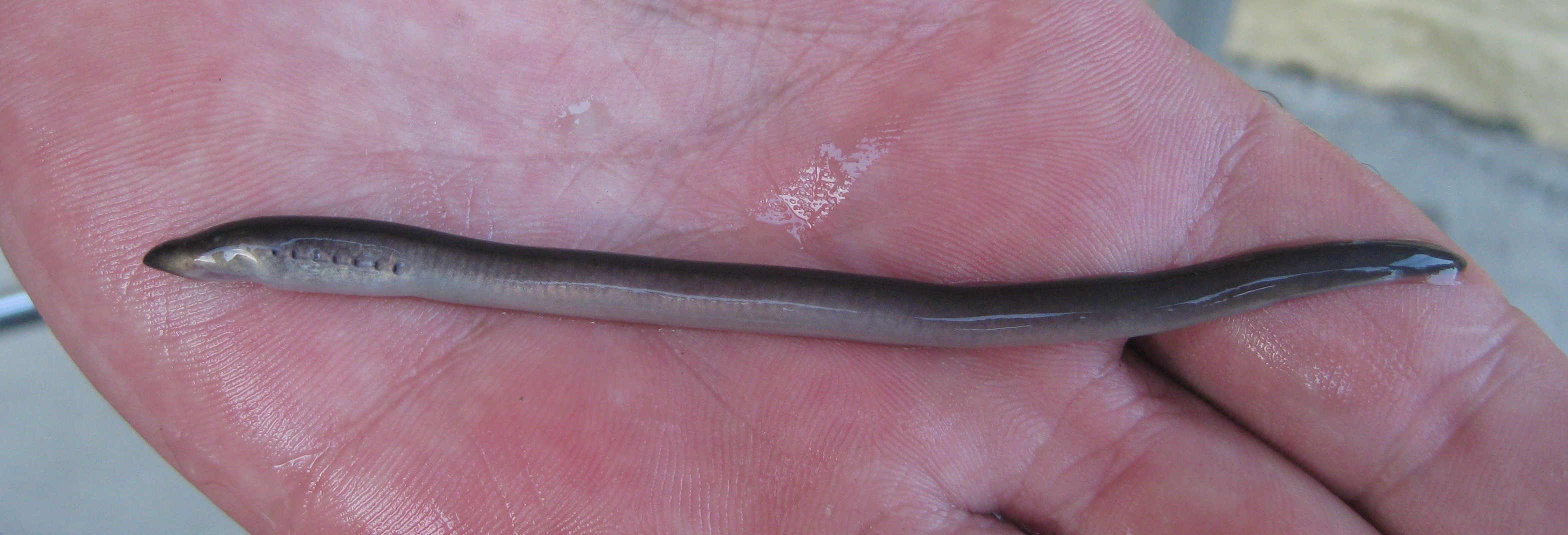
- Adult Mordacia praecox

Conservation status
- Endangered (IUCN 3.1)

Scientific classification
- Kingdom: Animalia
- Phylum: Chordata
- Infraphylum: Agnatha
- Superclass: Cyclostomi
- Class: Petromyzontida
- Order: Petromyzontiformes
- Family: Mordaciidae
- Genus: Mordacia
- Species: M. praecox

Binomial name
- Mordacia praecox Potter, 1968

= Mordacia praecox =

Species of jawless fish

Mordacia praecox, the Australian brook lamprey or nonparasitic lamprey, is a freshwater species of southern topeyed lamprey that occurs in south-eastern Australia. It has a thin eel-like body around 12 to 15 cm (4.7 to 5.9 in) long, with two low dorsal fins on the back half. The skin is dark blue above and grey below. Its eyes are small, and located on the top of its head. Unlike M. mordax, M. praecox has eyes that appear to have the potential for dichromatic vision despite being similarly adapted for low-light environments.

For many years M. praecox was known only known from the Moruya and Tuross rivers of southern New South Wales. It is believed to have become locally extinct from those rivers sometime between 1995 and 2003, but additional populations have been found in the Wallagaraugh River, which traverses the border between New South Wales and Victoria, and over 1000 km to the north in the Maroochy, Fraser Island and Water Park Creek river regions of Queensland. Two geographically isolated populations of non-parasitic Mordacia found in the Noosa river region of Queensland are believed to represent one or two closely related, but distinct, species that are yet to be described. Single specimens of Mordacia recorded from the Macleay and Richmond river regions of northern New South Wales suggest that further populations of Mordacia, most probably M. praecox, remain undiscovered in those areas.

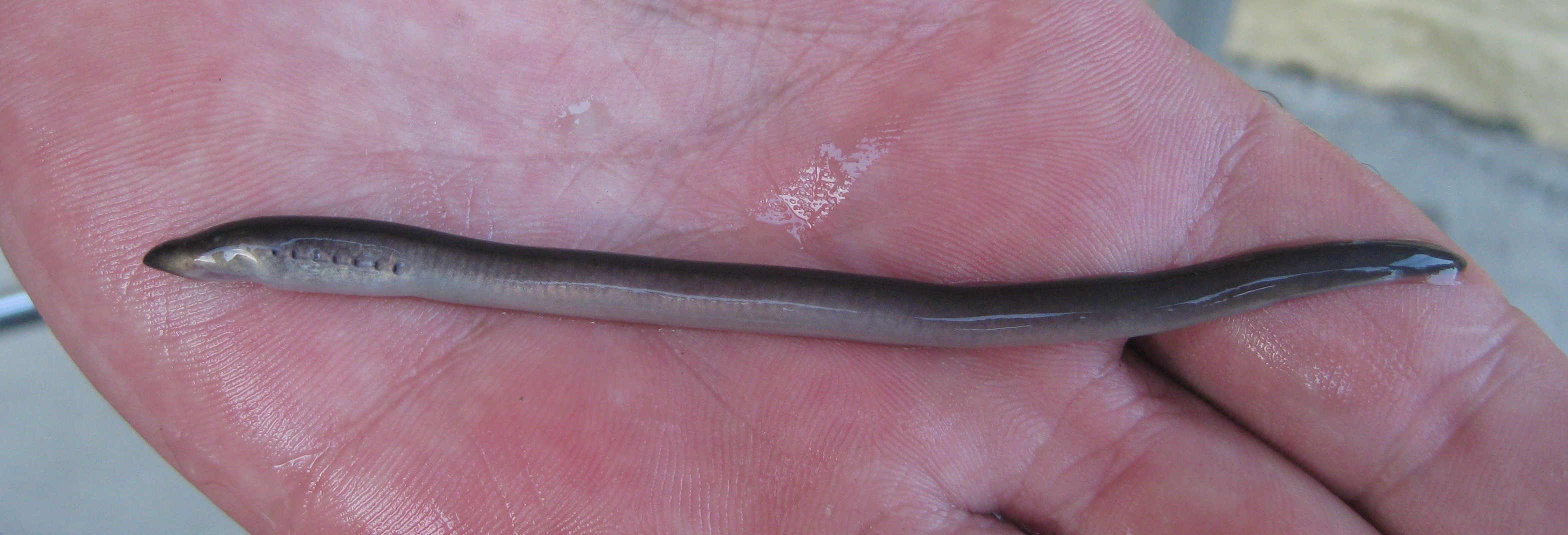
An adult Mordacia praecox from Water Park Creek, Queensland.

Unlike most other species of lampreys, M. praecox spends its entire life in fresh water. The ammocoetes (lamprey larvae) take around three years to reach maturity. Ammocoetes and juvenile adults are indistinguishable from those of M. mordax, which also occurs within its distribution, but the adults are easily distinguished by their size and colouration.
