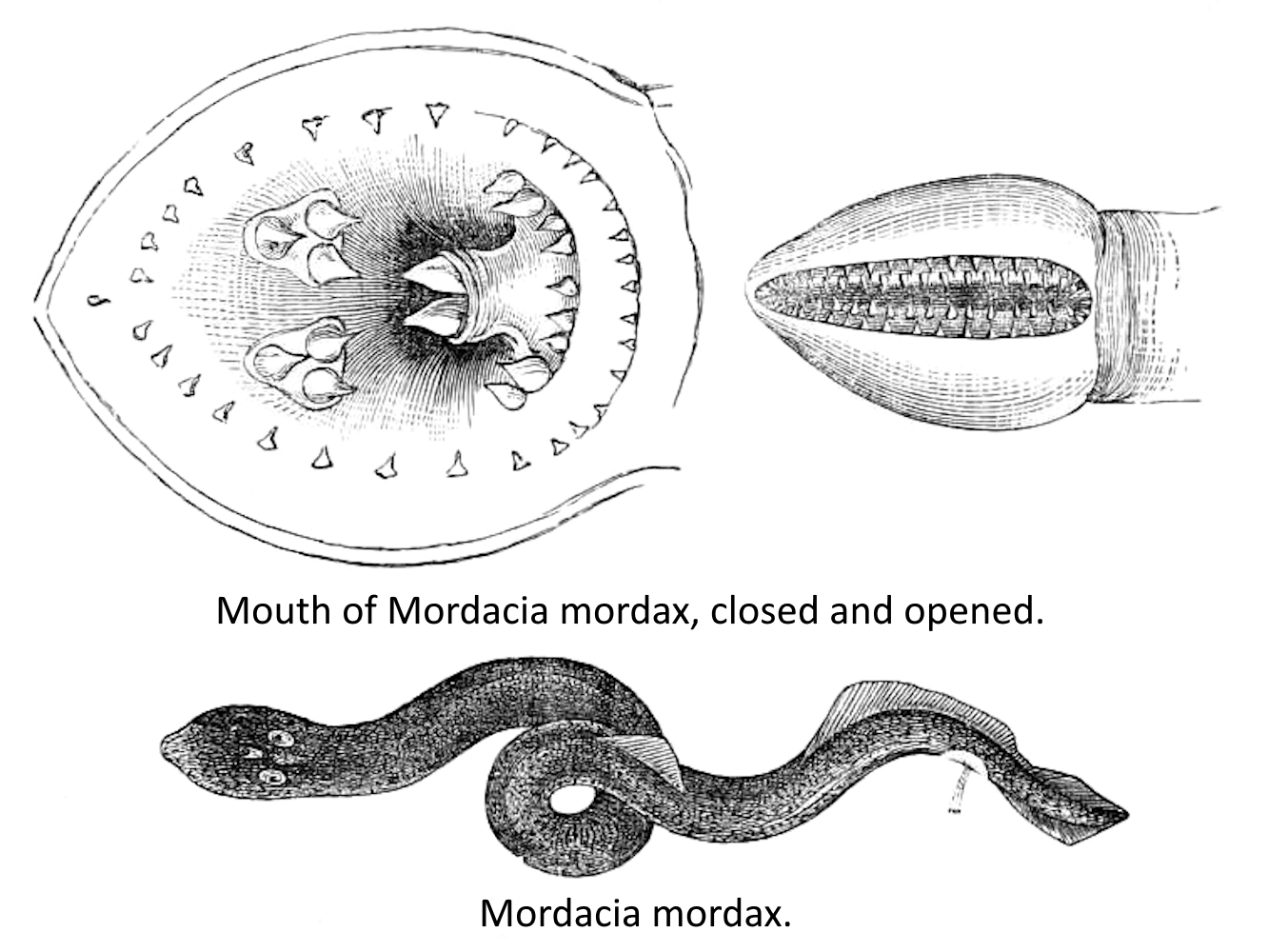

Conservation status
- Least Concern (IUCN 3.1)

Scientific classification
- Kingdom: Animalia
- Phylum: Chordata
- Infraphylum: Agnatha
- Class: Petromyzontida
- Order: Petromyzontiformes
- Family: Mordaciidae
- Genus: Mordacia
- Species: M. mordax

Binomial name
- Mordacia mordax (J. Richardson, 1846)

Synonyms
- Petromyzon mordax J. Richardson, 1846

= Mordacia mordax =

Short-headed lamprey

Species of jawless fish

Mordacia mordax, known as the short-headed lamprey, Australian lamprey or Murray lamprey, is a species of Mordacia that lives in south-eastern Australia and Tasmania. Mordaciidae is made up of three species: M. praedox, M. mordax, and M. lapicida. M. mordax is a relatively rare, parasitic vertebrate and, along with the hagfishes, is part of the only surviving group of jawless organisms throughout vertebrate evolution. It has a thin eel-like body up to 50 cm (20 in) long, with two low dorsal fins on the back half. The skin is blue-gray or brown. Its eyes are small, and located on the top of its head.

== Evolution ==
Members of Agnatha have been found in the fossil record for approximately five hundred million years and it has been identified as an important group in tracking vertebrate evolution. Despite being spatially close to the other southern hemisphere family Geotriidae, M. mordax has been shown to have key proteins with vastly different amino acid compositions. One such study of insulin extracted from organisms of both species indicated that 18 amino acids are different between G. australis and M. mordax when with northern hemisphere lampreys (P. marinus and L. fluviatilis) there is only a four amino acid difference. This data indicates that the southern hemisphere lampreys likely diverged evolutionarily a long time before. It has also been determined that Geotriidae and Petromyzontidae (the family of northern lampreys) likely share a more recent common ancestor than either does with any Mordacia species.

== Behavior and ecology ==
Adult M. mordax are parasites on other fish. They are anadromous (breeding in fresh water), migrating up streams in southeastern Australia from Shoalhaven River, New South Wales to Gulf St Vincent, South Australia. The ammocoetes (lamprey larvae) remain in fresh water until undergoing extreme physiological changes that allow them to move from eating plankton to larger fish. This leads to them migrating to the South Pacific and Southern Oceans around three to four years after hatching. Adults have been found to travel hundreds of miles to spawn. Feeding occurs in the open ocean until full sexual maturation occurs when M. mordax returns to freshwater rivers, spawns, and dies.

== Physiology ==
Larval M. mordax are between 20 and 150 mm (0.79 and 5.91 in) in length depending on their stage of development and when fully developed typically measure 300 to 420 mm (12 to 17 in). As it develops, M. mordax undergoes a number of extreme dental changes. It starts with a series of radial plates, and as it grows they separate and break into separate teeth. These teeth are pointed, unlike the other southern hemisphere lamprey Geotria australis which has spatulate (broad and rounded) teeth.

The eyes of Mordacia are dorsolaterally located, which is unlike the other known lamprey species, and they contain a photoreceptor that has both rod and cone characteristics. This photoreceptor is also unique to M. mordax and enhances vision in darkness by optimizing photon reception. It is not unlike deep sea fish eye anatomy, in that sense as M. mordax only comes out of the sediment of rivers at night to travel.

The posterior and anterior dorsal fins of Mordacia are continuous to the caudal fin, unlike G. australis. When M. mordax is fully developed those anterior and posterior dorsal fins are well separated, which distinguishes them from northern hemisphere lampreys.

Lampreys have been established as worthy models in understanding the development of higher vertebrate anatomy and physiology, with one such experiment determining that major classes of lipoproteins are similar in Mordacia to those found in humans. M. mordax and the lamprey group have also been shown to be the lowest vertebrate to have clear roles for neurohormones in the hypothalamic-pituitary-gonadal axis.
