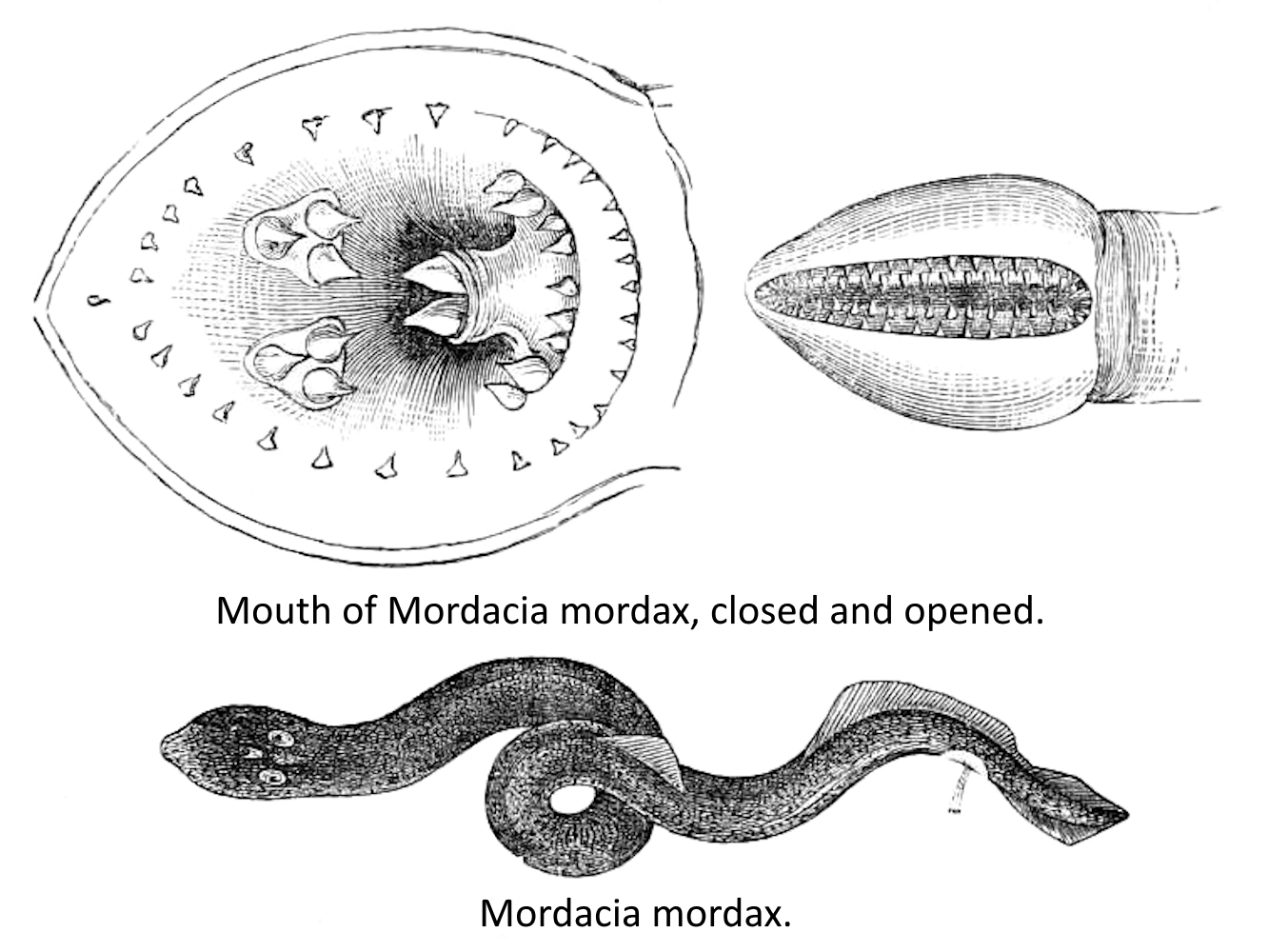
- Mordacia mordax

Scientific classification
- Kingdom: Animalia
- Phylum: Chordata
- Infraphylum: Agnatha
- Class: Petromyzontida
- Order: Petromyzontiformes
- Family: Mordaciidae; T. N. Gill, 1893
- Genus: Mordacia; J. E. Gray, 1851

Type species
- Petromyzon mordax J. Richardson, 1846

Synonyms
- Caragola Gray 1851 non Moore 1879

= Mordacia =

Southern topeyed lampreys

Genus of jawless fishes

Mordacia is a genus of lamprey, the sole genus of the family Mordaciidae, also known as the southern topeyed lampreys.

The family Mordaciidae is most closely related to the lamprey family Geotriidae, which has a similar Gondwanan distribution, and both families diverged during the Early Cretaceous. Together, their common ancestor diverged from the Petromyzontidae during the Middle Jurassic.

They are found in Chile and Australia; the Chilean and one Australian species (M. lapicida and M. mordax) are anadromous fish that spawn in Pacific-draining river basins and mature in the ocean, while the other Australian species (M. praecox) spends its whole life in freshwater. Phylogenetic evidence indicates ancient divergences within this genus, with the Chilean and Australian lineages diverging from one another during the Late Cretaceous (100 mya), although both Australian species only diverged from each other during the Pleistocene.

== Species ==
There are currently three recognized species in this genus:

- Mordacia lapicida (J. E. Gray, 1851) (Chilean lamprey)
- Mordacia mordax (J. Richardson, 1846) (Australian lamprey)
- Mordacia praecox Potter, 1968 (Australian brook lamprey)
