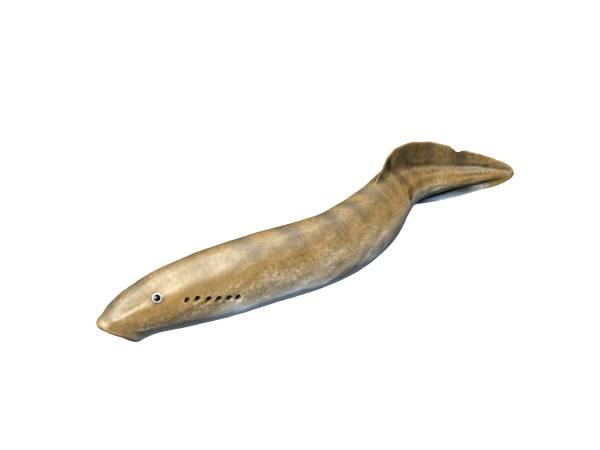
- Life reconstruction of M. pieckoensis

Scientific classification
- Kingdom: Animalia
- Phylum: Chordata
- Class: Hyperoartia
- Order: Petromyzontiformes
- Family: Mayomyzontidae
- Genus: Mayomyzon Bardack and Zangerl 1968

Type species
- Mayomyzon pieckoensis Bardack and Zangerl 1968

= Mayomyzon =

Mayomyzon Temporal range: Pennsylvanian (Moscovian to Kasimovian), 315–307 Ma

Extinct species of lamprey

Mayomyzon pieckoensis is an extinct species of lamprey that lived during the Late Carboniferous period, about 300 million years ago. It is the only known species of the genus Mayomyzon, which belongs to the family Mayomyzontidae. It is known from the Mazon Creek fossil beds located in present-day Illinois.

== Description ==
The fossil of M. pieckoensis is preserved as a carbon film in a concretion, which shows the outline of its body and some internal structures. The specimen is about 10 cm long and has a circular mouth with teeth, a single nostril, seven pairs of gill openings, and a dorsal fin that extends to the tail. The fossil also reveals that M. pieckoensis had pigmented eyes, which are rare among fossil vertebrates and suggest that it had some degree of vision.

Mayomyzon pieckoensis is considered to be one of the most basal lampreys, as it shares some features with the jawed vertebrates, such as the presence of a notochord and a cartilaginous skeleton. It also differs from modern lampreys in having fewer gill openings, larger eyes, and more teeth.
