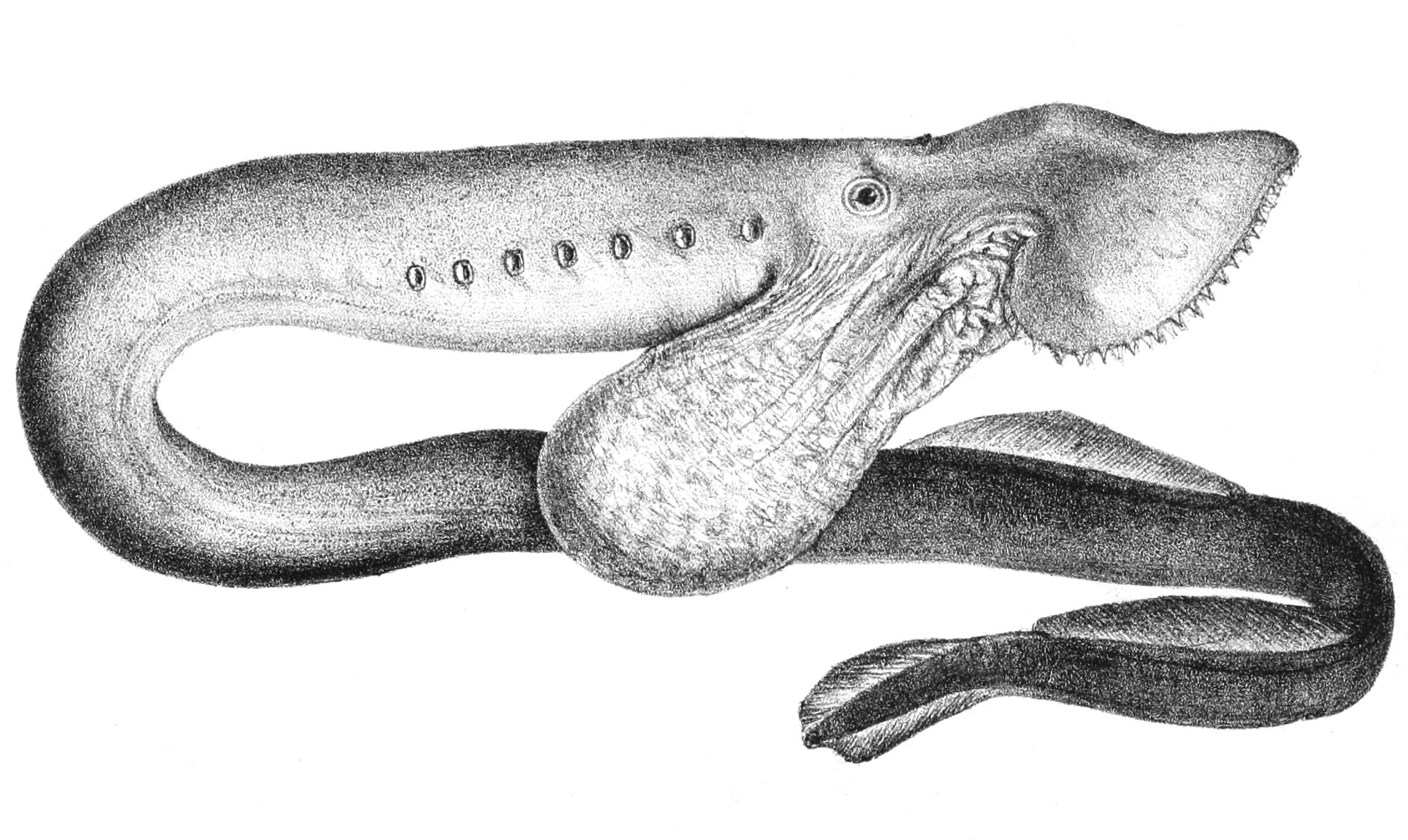
- Drawing of Geotria australis by W. Wing

Scientific classification
- Kingdom: Animalia
- Phylum: Chordata
- Infraphylum: Agnatha
- Superclass: Cyclostomi
- Class: Petromyzontida
- Order: Petromyzontiformes
- Family: Geotriidae; D. S. Jordan, 1923
- Genus: Geotria; J. E. Gray, 1851

Species
- Geotria australis; Geotria macrostoma

Synonyms
- Chilopterus Philippi 1858; Dionisia Lahille 1915 non Landau Chabaud, Miltgen & Baccam 1980; Exomegas Gill 1883 non Burmeister 1868; Macrophthalmia Plate 1897; Neomordacia Castelnau 1872; Thysanochilus Troschel 1857 non Butler 1878 non non Falc. 1839; Velasia Gray 1853; Yarra Castelnau 1872 non Krapp-Schickel 2000

= Geotria =

Genus of lampreys

Geotria is the only genus in the lamprey family Geotriidae. It has 2 known species: Geotria australis (pouched lamprey) and Geotria macrostoma (Argentinian lamprey). Both species were considered conspecific until G. macrostoma was revived in a 2020 study.

The family Geotriidae is most closely related to the lamprey family Mordaciidae, which has a similar Gondwanan distribution, and both families diverged during the Early Cretaceous. Together, their common ancestor diverged from the Petromyzontidae during the Middle Jurassic.

G. australis spawns in Pacific-draining river basins in on either side of the southern Pacific (both Australasia and Chile), while G. macrostoma spawns in Atlantic-draining basins in southern South America and nearby subantarctic islands. Despite the occurrence of both species in South America and both formerly being considered conspecific, phylogenetic studies suggest that the lineages of both species diverged during the Late Cretaceous, indicating very ancient origins for both.
