= Lamprey pie =

Fish-filled English pastry dish

Lamprey pie is a pastry dish made from sea lampreys or European river lampreys. Lampreys were a delicacy for the wealthy in medieval England and were often given as gifts to royalty as a means of seeking favour. It became tradition for the city of Gloucester to give the monarch a lamprey pie each Christmas. In 1200 the city was fined 40 marks (equivalent to £47,000 in 2025) for failing to provide the pie. The annual custom ended in 1836, but in 1893 it was revived when Gloucester mayor, John A. Matthews wished to send a pie to Queen Victoria during her Jubilee Year. The pie was made and sent annually by John A. Fisher and Sons, Ltd., Tudor House, Gloucester, until in 1917 King George V requested that the gifting be suspended until World War One had ended. It was never revived. John A. Fisher died at age 82 in 1929. A lamprey pie is still presented on special occasions such as coronations and jubilees.

== Background ==
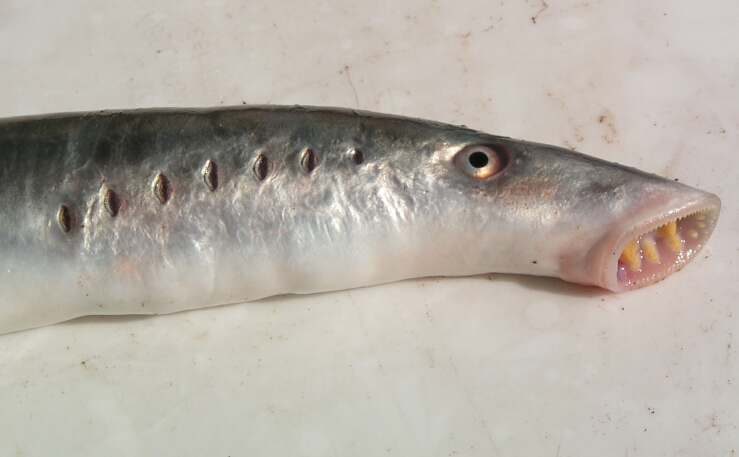
A European river lamprey

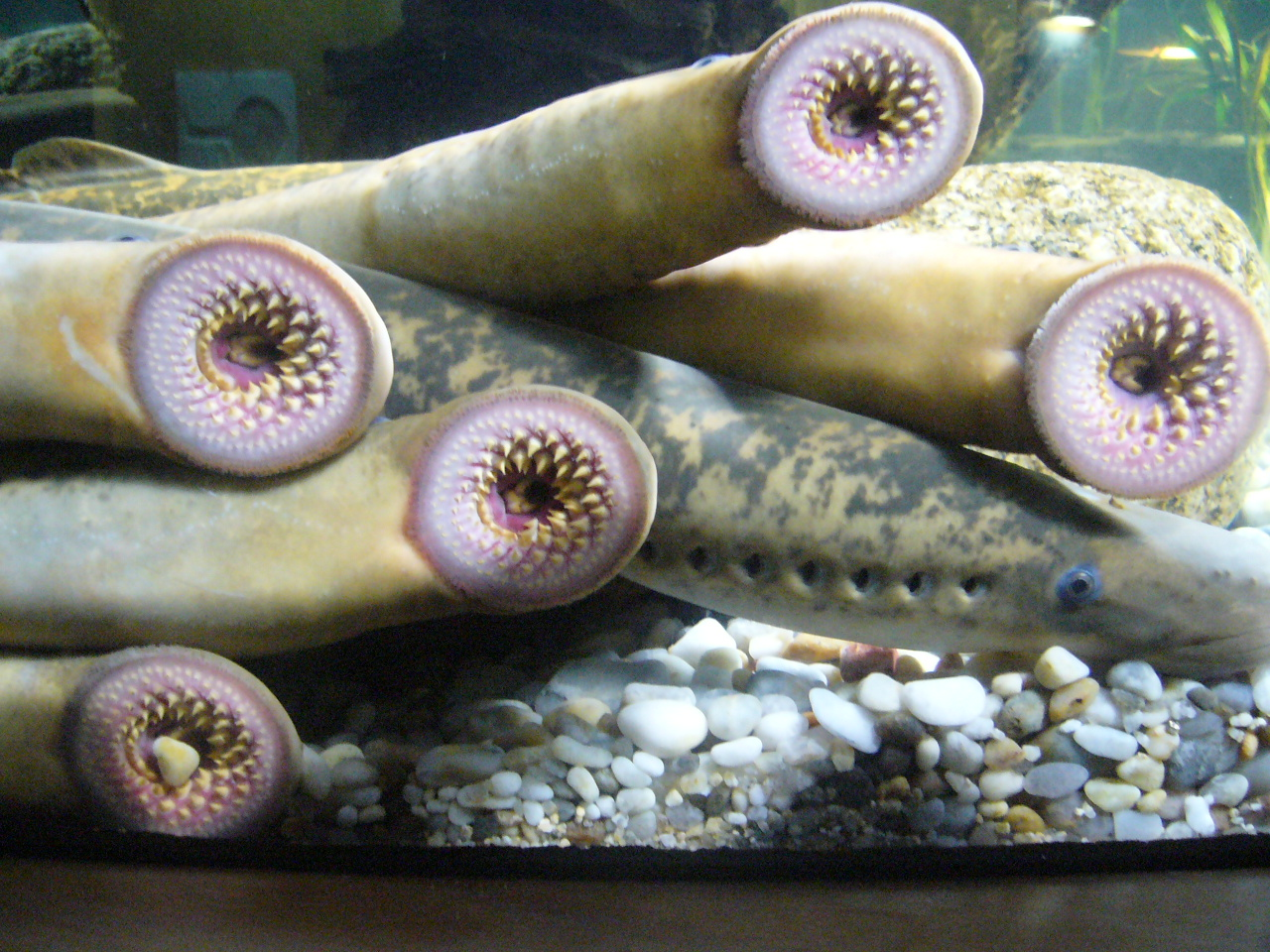
A number of sea lampreys, showing mouth parts

Lampreys are parasitic carnivorous elongated jawless fishes present in saltwater and freshwater. In Europe the sea lamprey and European river lamprey have a long history as a human foodstuff. They were eaten by the Romans since at least the 1st century AD and were considered a high-status food. In medieval Europe they attained particular popularity as a meaty-tasting fish that could be eaten on fast days. The food became associated with medieval Christmases, as Christmas Eve, the last day of Advent, was a fast day. They were a popular foodstuff of royalty; Henry I (r. 1100–1135) died, according to the chronicler Henry of Huntingdon, after eating too many ("a surfeit of lampreys") whilst on campaign in Northern France.

The River Severn at Gloucester was a key source of lampreys for the English royalty, and the fish was often given by landowners to royals as a means of seeking favour. The fish was an expensive luxury; the Earl of Chester gave King John (r. 1199–1216) a single lamprey and received a palfrey horse in return. John raised funds by issuing licences at two shillings a piece to entitle commoners to eat lampreys. The peak lamprey season is March, April and May, making them scarce around Christmas.

== Pie ==
By 1200 it had become customary for the city of Gloucester to send the English monarch a pie each year, and King John fined the city 40 marks or £26 13s 4d (equivalent to £47,000 in 2025) for failing to send a pie at Christmas. By the reign of Edward III (r. 1327–1377) lampreys had declined in price somewhat but remained expensive enough to restrict them to the wealthy. Maurice de Berkeley, 4th Baron Berkeley (c. 1330–1368) sent Edward the first two lampreys of the year at the cost of £6 7s 2d (equivalent to £5,700 in 2025). The custom of Gloucester sending the monarch a lamprey pie, decorated with gilded ornaments, at Christmas ended in 1836 when it was considered too expensive.

Lamprey pie remained a delicacy in England until the early 19th century; it was sometimes called Politicians' Pie. Margaret Taylor, writing in 1795, described a lamprey pie recipe: "clean, wash and season them with sweet seasoning; lay them in a coffin with citron and lemon sliced; butter and close the pie". Other recipes called for the lampreys to be baked in syrup in a high pie crust, after which the crust is opened and wine and spices are poured in. These are then spooned onto bread on a warmed dish, after which the lamprey is sliced thinly and laid on top.

== Decline and legacy ==
The prevalence of lampreys in English rivers declined in the 19th century, possibly as a result of the increasing numbers of weirs installed. The lamprey is said to have vanished from the upper reaches of the Severn by the middle of the century, with a further decline apparent from 1865. It is now rarely caught in the Severn or the Bristol Channel and is a protected species. There is a single lamprey fishery surviving in Britain, on the River Ouse in Yorkshire, where it is primarily sold as fishing bait. Lampreys remain popular in Scandinavia, the Baltic States and the Atlantic coast of continental Europe, where the fish is eaten as a delicacy.

A lamprey pie is still presented by Gloucester to the monarch of the United Kingdom on special occasions. A 20-pound (9.1 kg) pie was presented at the 1953 Coronation of Elizabeth II. Although the lampreys were supplied by a Gloucester-based company, they were sourced from Grimsby. A pie was also presented at the Silver Jubilee in 1977. By the time of the 2012 Diamond Jubilee no British lampreys could be sourced, and lampreys from the Great Lakes in North America were used. For the Coronation of Charles III and Camilla in 2023 the traditional pie was made with pork and decorated with two pastry lampreys because of the dwindling number of actual lampreys in Britain.

== See also ==
- Eel pie
- List of pies, tarts and flans

== Sources ==
- Hollister, C. Warren (2003). Frost, Amanda Clark (ed.). Henry I. New Haven, US and London, UK: Yale University Press. ISBN 978-0-300-09829-7.
