= Save Ontario Shipwrecks =

Provincial heritage NGO in Ontario, Canada

- Abbreviation: SOS
- Formation: 1981
- Type: NGO Underwater archaeology
- Legal status: Registered Charity # 886164193RR0001
- Purpose: Nautical Archaeological research, publishing, education & training
- Headquarters: Blenheim, Ontario Canada
- Location: P.O. BOX 2389, Blenheim, Ontario N0P 1A0
- Region served: Ontario, Canada
- Members: open to the public
- Official language: English, French
- President: Mrs. Kristine Nickle
- Affiliations: Nautical Archaeology Society, NDA, Preserve Ontario Shipwrecks (POW) and ErieQuest
- Website: saveontarioshipwrecks.ca

Save Ontario Shipwrecks (SOS) is a Provincial Heritage Organization in Ontario, Canada. SOS is a public charitable organization which operates through Local Chapter Committees supported by a Provincial Board of Directors and Provincial Executive.

== Mission ==
Save Ontario Shipwrecks's mission is to study, preserve and promote an appreciation of Ontario's marine heritage. SOS believes in leaving artifacts where found as opposed to preservation in museum collection storage facilities. SOS, was formed in 1981 to change that mentality. "When diving really took off in the '60s and '70s, it was clear to preservationists that something needed to be done to prevent looting," Michael Hill, president of SOS recalled.

SOS studies Ontario's marine heritage through historical and archival research, oral histories, side scan surveys and underwater archaeological investigations. SOS preserves Ontario's marine heritage through mooring program, site monitoring and documentation activities. The mooring program seeks to minimize anchor damage on sites which are regularly being visited by sport divers. In 2005 SOS created the Dive To Preserve program (www.DiveToPreserve.org) which promotes Marine Heritage preservation through Low Impact diving, site stewardship, and reporting of site conditions. SOS promote an appreciation of Ontario's marine heritage through presentations to scuba training courses, public groups and dive clubs. SOS designs, produces and brings displays about marine heritage to underwater trade shows and conferences which highlight the need for all divers to use shipwreck sites responsibly and minimize the negative impact of their visit. SOS works with the diving tourism industry, from the standpoint of site preservation. SOS lobbies government to develop resource management initiatives which balance study, preservation and use.

== History ==
SOS was incorporated in February 1981 with Rick Jackson, Andrew Garay and Gain Wong as the first directors. Save Ontario Shipwrecks (SOS)'s first Chapters were Save Ontario Shipwrecks-Toronto in Toronto, Niagara, Peterborough and Save Ontario Shipwrecks - Ottawa in Ottawa. Although SOS was originally centred in Toronto, it is currently centred Save Ontario Shipwrecks (SOS) in Blenheim, Ontario. SOS Ottawa Valley, Sault Ste Marie, Superior, London and Sudbury were formed in 1984. In 1985, SOS Quinte, and SOS Oshawa came on board, followed by Ohio in 1986. In 1986, Chapters formed in Windsor, Ingleside (which was closely affiliated with the Lost Villages Historical Society) and Thunder Bay.

More recent groups include:

- Save Ontario Shipwrecks - Hamilton in Hamilton, Ontario
- Save Ontario Shipwrecks - Central Region
- Save Ontario Shipwrecks - Eastern Region
- Save Ontario Shipwrecks - Huron Shores
- Save Ontario Shipwrecks - Northern Region Manitoulin
- Save Ontario Shipwrecks - Port Dover
- Save Ontario Shipwrecks - Thousand Islands
- Save Ontario Shipwrecks - Windsor

In 1986, the Ministry of Culture awarded SOS Core Funding grant, which developed a more structured fiscal operating system, and reorganized to manage day-to-day affairs in a more professional manner. By 1986, SOS had a definite Board of Directors, with Officers and an Executive Committee to manage the day-to-day affairs of the corporation.

== Projects ==
SOS projects are designed to protect dive sites, and communicate to the public. SOS chapter sponsored projects include plaques, surveys, buoys, underwater sculpture park and scuba diver training through the Nautical Archaeology Society (NAS).

=== Courses ===
In 2009, SOS became the licensing authority in Ontario for Nautical Archaeology Society. Courses, which are available across the province, teach and certify participants in a survey of a shipwreck or site. The courses cover how to date a vessel, how to measure a wreck, how to write a report and how to submit it to the government.

=== Plaques, guides and dive slates ===
SOS produced Dive Plaques for a number of popular dive sites including: Rothesay, King Horn, Conestoga (ship), Red Pine Bay Shipwreck, Weehawk and 5 Sunken Treasures. The Rothesay (1868), a wooden side wheeler in the St. Lawrence River, west of Prescott collided with the tug Myra and sank on Sept. 12, 1889, was blown up in a munition exercise in 1901 by members of the Royal Military College of Canada and was rediscovered on Sept. 25, 1964 by the Underwater Archeology Society of Ottawa. Save Ontario Shipwrecks, Thousand Island Chapter erected a plaque on the wreck of The King Horn, a two-masted schooner fitted as a barge sank around 1897 near Brockville, Lake Ontario. Unfortunately, two bilge pumps on the deck were damaged by careless use of anchors. The plaque reminds divers who visit the King Horn that Ontario marine heritage is a resource worth conserving.

SOS produced Divers' Guides and Dive Slates for a number of dive sites and wrecks which include the sight layout, history, dive notes and directions: Lillie Parsons, Conestoga, C.B. Benson, Henry C. Daryaw, Keystorm, Kinghorn, Lyman M Davis, Muscallonge, Robert Gaskin, Rothesay, Southern Trail, and Wexford. Dive Slates are field guides made of white styrene plastic that can be written on underwater in pencil. The front has a history of the vessel and an above water image. The back has an underwater plan of the site and dive notes. Lillie Parsons (1868) is a 19th-century Great Lakes centreboard schooner that hit rocks and sank off Sparrow Island, near Brockville August 5, 1877.

=== Surveys ===
SOS Quinte was formed in 1985 to explore the Annie Falconer, the wreck of a late-1800s schooner near Picton (Pt. Traverse). SOS Peterborough surveyed the wreck of Stone Lodge in 1985.

In 1990, when SOS studied the Mayflower, which was lost November 12, 1912, they used grid wires to section off the ship to allow sector-by-sector photos of the wreck in Kamaniskeg Lake.

SOS has explored wrecks which were once rich with artifacts, many of which are now regrettably gone. There remains the ship's stove and wheel of the Prince of Wales (1860)/ the Sligo, a three-masted barque which sank in 1918 near Toronto, Ontario, and was discovered in 1984. SOS Ottawa surveyed in 1988 the wreck of the steamer Conestoga (ship) (1878) a wooden cargo ship that caught fire and sank off Cardinal on May 22, 1922 outside Lock 28 of the Old Galop Canal. SOS surveyed The Mink (1912-1927) / Waome (1927-1934) a wooden steamer which sank in Lake Muskoka, 6 October 1934, just west of Keewaydin Island. SOS explored the W.H. Simpson (1889) /Monarch a steam powered tugboat which sank to the bottom of St. Clair River, south of the Bluewater Bridge in Sarnia, Ontario on July 6, 1934.

Many wrecks explored by SOS are not fully intact, unlike the George A. Marsh (1882), a three-masted schooner, which sank on August 8, 1917, during a summer gale off Amherst Island near Kingston, Ontario

The SOS Ohio chapter explored 22 wrecks in Fathom Five National Marine Park in 1986–1987, a popular place to snorkel and scuba dive. The Sweepstakes, for example, a two-masted schooner which sank in 1885, lies just below the surface in Big Tub harbor.

SOS also explored the wreck of the SS Keystorm (1909–1910), which struck Scow Island shoal in fog near Alexandria Bay, New York on October 12, 1912.

Although SOS generally surveys shipwrecks, chapters also explored The Lost Villages. Guard Lock 21, which was constructed in 1885/86, was flooded in 1936 as headwater for the Hydro dam at Cornwall. Mille Roches Power House (1901) at Cornwall was demolished prior to inundation in 1955 with the new Powerdam and Seaway nearing completion.

SOS performs surveys on unidentified wrecks. In June 2013, for example, SOS Ottawa Chapter tentatively named The Locweld Wreck, which rests on the bed of the St. Lawrence River near the former Locweld manufacturing site west of Guidon Park in Cornwall, Ontario.

=== Buoys ===
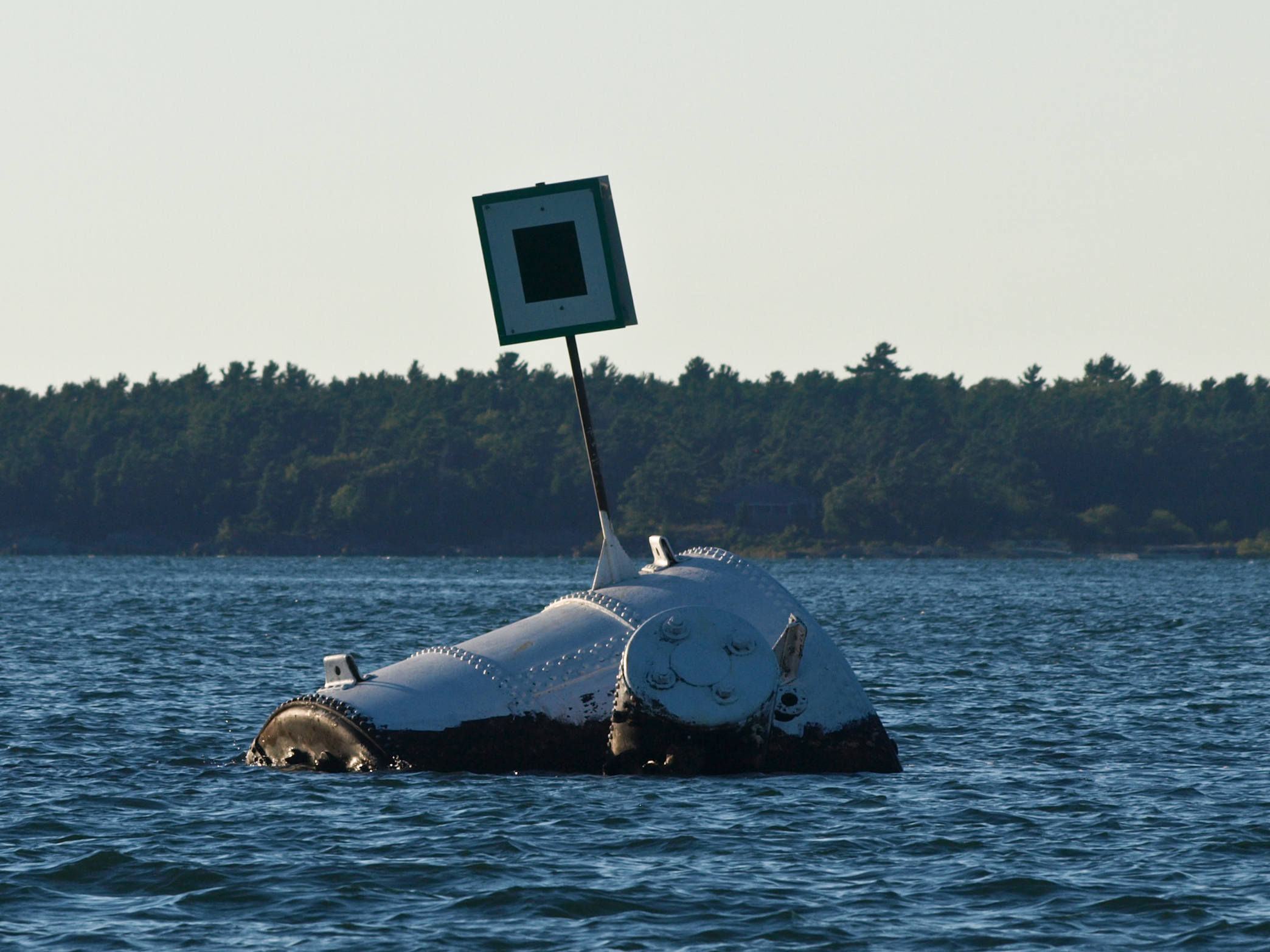
Wreck Of The Metamora

SOS's province wide campaign to provide and maintain (80) mooring buoys which make it easy to identify and hold on the dive site, to SOS chapters and affiliated organizations began in 2005."Before our mooring program, boats would drop anchor and end up pulling part of the wreck with them when they moved," said Michael Hill, president of SOS. "Now, the most popular dive sites all have moorings." In Georgian Bay, for example, the ship's boiler, which has been painted white and has a channel marker attached to it identifies remains of the wreck of the tug The Metamora, which sank near Pointe au Baril in Georgian Bay in 1907. The upper portion of the steeple engine, which protrudes above the river, marks the site of the Conestoga (ship) (1878), which sunk on May 22, 1922.

=== Underwater Sculpture Park ===
SOS has develops underwater parks, which are designed to divert divers from sensitive underwater ecosystems. The Thousand Islands chapter of S.O.S., for example, wants to create an underwater sculpture park in the St. Lawrence River a short distance from Centeen Park in 2014–15. Students of Thousand Islands Secondary School are creating 6 sculptures representing six people looking up at the river's surface out of concrete and rebar for the park under the supervision of art teacher Dave Sheridan. Sheridan, who is a diver and projects manager for the Thousand Islands S.O.S. chapter was inspired to develop a memorial for all who have perished in the river by diver and artist Jason deCaires Taylor.

=== Awards ===
The Save Ontario Shipwrecks Marine Heritage Award is given annually. In 2013, for example, the award was received by Cris Kohl, who is a maritime historian, scuba diver, author, lecturer, photographer, and videographer.

== SOS Chapters ==
- Save Ontario Shipwrecks - Central Region
- Save Ontario Shipwrecks - Eastern Region
- Save Ontario Shipwrecks - Hamilton
- Save Ontario Shipwrecks - Huron Shores
- Save Ontario Shipwrecks - Northern Region Manitoulin
- Save Ontario Shipwrecks - Ohio
- Save Ontario Shipwrecks - Ottawa
- Save Ontario Shipwrecks - Port Dover
- Save Ontario Shipwrecks - Quinte
- Save Ontario Shipwrecks - Thousand Islands
- Save Ontario Shipwrecks - Toronto
- Save Ontario Shipwrecks - Windsor

== See also ==
- Nautical Archaeology Society – British organisation to further research in nautical archaeology for the public benefit
- Sea Research Society – American nonprofit for marine research
- Society for Underwater Historical Research – Amateur maritime archaeology organisation in South Australia
- List of shipwrecks of Canada
- List of shipwrecks in the Great Lakes
