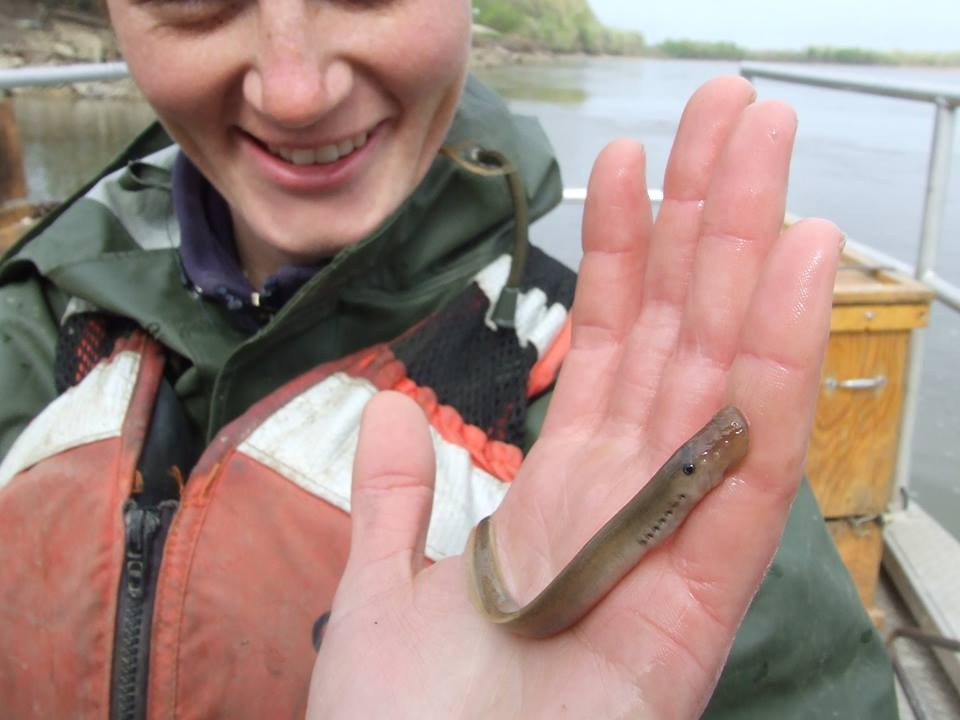
- Young chestnut lamprey found in Missouri

Conservation status
- Least Concern (IUCN 3.1)

- Apparently Secure (NatureServe)

Scientific classification
- Kingdom: Animalia
- Phylum: Chordata
- Infraphylum: Agnatha
- Class: Petromyzontida
- Order: Petromyzontiformes
- Family: Petromyzontidae
- Genus: Ichthyomyzon
- Species: I. castaneus

Binomial name
- Ichthyomyzon castaneus Girard, 1858

Synonyms
- Ichthyomyzon hirudo Girard 1858

= Chestnut lamprey =

Species of jawless fish

The chestnut lamprey (Ichthyomyzon castaneus) is a species of lamprey.

== Description ==
The chestnut lamprey has a maximum length of around 38 centimetres (15 in), with a tan to yellowish-olive hue above, the sides, belly, and fin lighter. They are blue-black just after spawning. The jawless mouth expands wider than the head, with many firm slender teeth, typically 4 lateral bicuspids on both sides of the innermost row, in front of which are 6–11 sharp cusps, and 2–3 anterior to the mouth. It has a long dorsal fin and no paired fins.

=== Life cycle ===
During the egg stage of the lamprey's life, it is vulnerable to predators that prefer to eat fish eggs. Predation by other fish helps keep lamprey numbers under control. When the lamprey has hatched from its egg into the larvae stage, it is limited to pools or backwater areas with a sand or sandy mud bottom. The young lampreys filter feed for food for around five to seven years until they are large enough to attach themselves to a host species. Spawning of this species of lamprey occurs from June to July when the animals are around seven to nine years old and migrate to tributaries to protect the young from predators, though most spawning activity has been observed in mid-June. During the mating process, one female would begin moving rocks from a suitable area for eggs; afterward she attaches herself to a rock while hopeful males attach to her and stroke her tail attempting to mate. The eggs are then covered with a rock, presumably to shade the young lampreys at birth and to keep any predators from devouring the young. As with most lampreys, the chestnut lamprey only mates once during its entire life and dies shortly after.

=== Similar species ===
The chestnut lamprey is closely related to the nonparasitic southern brook lamprey, and the two have been termed a paired species.

Similar species include the parasitic relatives Ichthyomyzon bdellium, I. greeleyi, and I. unicuspis.

== Distribution and habitat ==
The range of the chestnut lamprey extends from Lake Winnipeg and the Hudson Bay down the Mississippi River to the Central and Eastern United States; this includes any large lakes or reservoirs where large host fish are present. In Canada, the chestnut lamprey has been found in Saskatchewan, Manitoba, Ontario, and Quebec. Larvae can be found in pools and backwater over sand and sandy mud.

== Ecology ==
Adults are parasitic and feed on other fish by clamping to their side with their suctorial mouths and creating a wound with their teeth to obtain body fluids. It was widely presumed that this fish did not feed during the winter, but recent research in Wisconsin has revealed some lampreys remain attached to their host during the winter months; one fisherman caught a sturgeon with a chestnut lamprey still attached. Observation of this species has revealed that they are primarily a nocturnal animal and they seek out shade during daylight. These lampreys may be beneficial to the rivers and lakes, due to their natural control of local fish populations. Human populations can pose threats to these animals through pollution, siltation, and dredging. Larval lamprey must filter feed for numerous years and are vulnerable to changes in their environment during this time. For instance, larval lampreys will starve if large particulate matter regularly block their mouths.
