= Fathom Five National Marine Park =

National marine conservation area in Ontario, Canada

- IUCN category VI (protected area with sustainable use of natural resources)
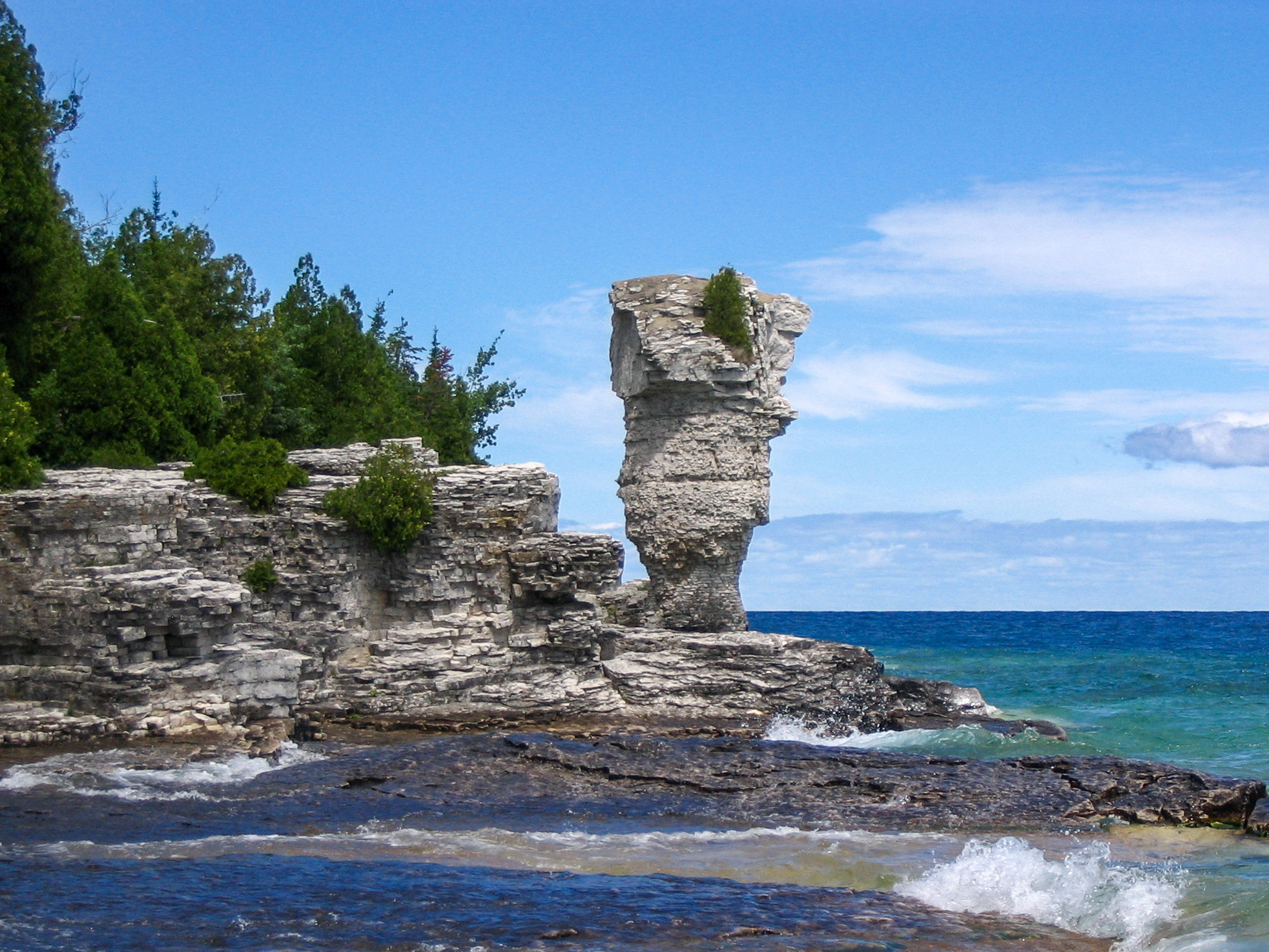
- Flowerpot Island

- Location within Canada Location within Southern Ontario
- Location: Georgian Bay, Ontario, Canada
- Nearest city: Tobermory, Ontario
- Coordinates: 45°19′17″N 81°37′34″W
- Area: 112 km^{2} (43 sq mi)
- Established: 20 July 1987
- Visitors: 227,828 (in 2022–23)
- Governing body: Parks Canada

Fathom Five National Marine Park is a National Marine Conservation Area in the Georgian Bay part of Lake Huron, Ontario, Canada, that seeks to protect and display shipwrecks and lighthouses, and conserve freshwater ecosystems. Parks Canada has management plans for the aquatic and terrestrial ecosystems, with a multi-action plan for species that are at risk, including endemic species, the Monarch butterfly, the eastern ribbonsnake, and the eastern whip-poor-will. The aquatic ecosystems in the park are also of particular interest. Many fish, shellfish, amphibians, and eels are an attraction for naturalists in the park. Much of this wildlife is accessible to scuba divers and snorkellers in the park. The many shipwrecks make the park a popular scuba diving destination, and glass bottom boat tours leave Tobermory regularly, allowing tourists to see the shipwrecks without having to get wet. Additionally, there are three main popular hiking trails found within Fathom Five National Marine Park that provides visitors with views of old growth forests and the Georgian Bay. The Saugeen Ojibway Peoples have inhabited the Bruce Peninsula and the area that is now Fathom Five National Marine Park for thousands of years. This land provided for their communities and their people with the plethora of wildlife and plant life. They provide the local knowledge about Lake Huron and its ecological value to the reserve, park, and their overall livelihood. Parks Canada and Saugeen Ojibway People's collaboration is said to yield a benefit to both parties with regard to overall ecosystem knowledge.

Many visitors camp at nearby Bruce Peninsula National Park and use the park as a base to explore Fathom Five and the surrounding area during the day.

Fathom Five also contains numerous islands, notably Flowerpot Island, which has rough camping facilities, marked trails, and its namesake flowerpots, outlying stacks of escarpment cliff that stand a short distance from the island, most with vegetation (including trees) still growing on them.

The park was established on 20 July 1987 using the area of the Fathom Five Provincial Park and the western portion of the Georgian Bay Islands National Park. The park represented a pioneering departure for the national park system, which had centred on land-based conservation until then. Its designation as a National Marine Park foresaw the creation of others, though nomenclature for such units would morph into National Marine Conservation Areas, leaving Fathom Five as the only National Marine Park. Despite its unique name, it is categorized as an NMCA and is deemed the first one in the country.

== Visitors' centre ==
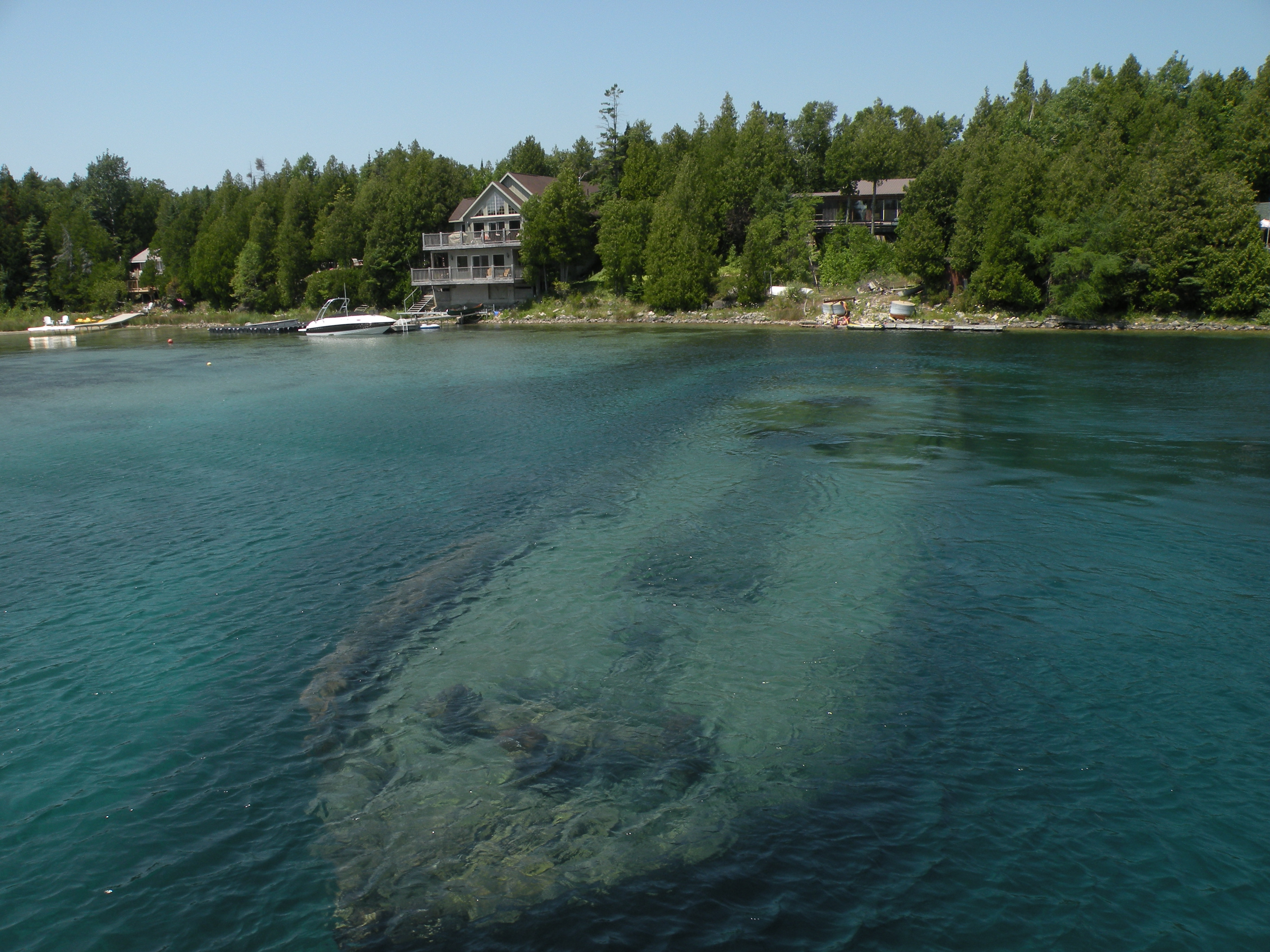
The Sweepstakes

In 2006, a new visitors' centre opened to serve Fathom Five National Marine Park and the Bruce Peninsula National Park. Designed by Andrew Frontini of Shore Tilbe Irwin + Partners, the CAD $7.82 million centre, approached by a boardwalk, features an information centre, reception area, exhibit hall and theatre. A 20-metre viewing tower was also constructed to provide visitors with aerial views of the surrounding park and Georgian Bay. The centre was designed with environmental sustainability in mind, receiving $224,000 from the Federal House in Order initiative for implementation of innovative greenhouse gas reduction technology.

== Recreation ==
With an annual visitation number of 490,388 from 2019-2021, Fathom Five National Marine Park is a popular destination among locals and tourists. The park has three main trails, which range in duration from five minutes to two hours. The Bruce Trail to Little Dunks Bay is approximately two kilometres long and provides visitors with a panoramic view of Little Dunks Bay and Georgian Bay. The Bruce Trail Burnt Point Loop has the longest hike of the three, encompassing 4.8 km, which passes through cedar forests and provides a view of Georgian Bay. Visitors can embark on the shortest hike that is less than half a kilometre in length, passing by the visitor centre on their way to Tobermory Harbour.

== Park management ==
=== Management plan ===
The management plans for the Fathom Five National Park was made in 1998. The park was created to protect the longevity of the Georgian Bay marine biodiversity and environment. The aquatic ecosystems management was created to study the structure of the ecosystem and resources, protect species and habitats, and identify the impact of nonnative species and make management plans to take action if they negatively impact native species. The fish management plan was created to monitor the populations, and allow sustainable harvest through commercial and sport fishing. The terrestrial ecosystems management plan was created to monitor the islands’ biogeography and to and reduce human impact on the environment. This is done by preventing new species from being introduced and limiting public access to areas. Additionally, management requires environmental impact assessments to be done prior to any activities or development.

=== Management progress ===
The management progress was last reported by Parks Canada in 2010. The goals to conserve and monitor aquatic ecosystems is approximately 50% complete. The coastal ecosystems' water quality, water level, fish populations, and connectivity are in good condition. The island ecosystems' habitat and connectivity is in fair condition, and they are still developing the offshore and social indicators. The goals to preserve the terrestrial ecosystems are being met, and is in fair condition. The goal of having environmental impact assessments is also being followed prior to activities.

== Threatened and endangered species ==
A multi-species action plan to conserve threatened and endangered species was created by Parks Canada to be implemented in Fathom Five National Park and Bruce Peninsula National Park. The plan includes COSEWIC’s (Committee on the Status of Endangered Wildlife in Canada) identification of the species threat status, and plans to recover the population size and distribution of the species.

There are endemic species included in the plan, such as Dwarf Lake Iris (Iris lacurstris) and Lakeside Daisy (Tetraneuris herbacea). The Dwarf Lake Iris's status is of special concern, as it is only found in the Great Lakes basin, with one of its locations being Lake Huron. It is a perennial plant with blue or purple petals which blooms between mid-May and early June. The Lakeside Daisy status is also of special concern, as it is likewise only found near the Great Lakes. It is a perennial herb with yellow ray petals and blooms between May and early June.

=== Monarch butterfly ===
The monarch butterfly (Danaus plexippus) is a species of butterfly that is currently listed as a species of special concern in the province of Ontario. This migratory butterfly is found in Fathom Five Marine Park, as well as other parts of Southeast Canada and the Northeast United States during its breeding season in the summer. Upon breeding, the monarch butterflies embark on a mass migration of approximately 4,500 kilometres to their final resting place in Central Mexico. As a species of special concern, the monarch butterfly is neither threatened nor endangered. As a result of habitat loss and the use of pesticides and herbicides, the monarch butterfly's natural habitat has been dramatically impacted. The monarch butterfly is a globally threatened species, and its numbers have declined dramatically throughout the past few decades, from 10 million butterflies in 1980 to 1914 butterflies in 2021.

=== Massassauga rattlesnake ===
The massassauga rattle snake (Sistrurus catenatus) is a species of snake listed as endangered under the Species at Risk Act (SARA). This snake has a long, grayish-brown body with semi round spots throughout its body, and it ranges in size from 50–70 cm long. The species is found in the Fathom Five Marine Park, in habitats such as tall grass, bogs, marshes, shorelines, and forests. In addition to habitat loss caused by human expansion, these snakes are also at risk of being killed by motor vehicles or ill-intentioned humans. There are approximately 10,000 adult massasauga rattle snakes found throughout Eastern Ontario and Quebec; however, a substantial portion of this population can be found within the Fathom Five Marine Park and the Bruce Peninsula. Both the Massasauga - Great Lakes / St. Lawrence population and the Massasauga - Carolinian population are experiencing steady declines in population numbers.

=== Eastern ribbon snake ===
The eastern ribbon snake (Thamnophis saurita) is a species of snake that is listed as a "special concern" that is likely to become endangered if proper precautions are not taken. On its sides and back, the snake has three yellow stripes that easily distinguish it from other snakes. The Fathom Five Marine Park is home to this species of snake, which is normally found in environments near water. The snake is threatened by habitat loss as a result of human development. In addition, the eastern ribbon snake relies heavily on the ability to hunt amphibians and is experiencing a decline in food availability due to habitat loss and degradation. Currently, there are an estimated 1,000-3,000 adult eastern ribbon snakes inhabiting Ontario, and their numbers are steadily declining.

=== Eastern whip-poor-will ===
The eastern whip-poor-will (Caprimulgus vociferus) is currently listed as threatened under the Species at Risk Act (SARA), and if proper measures are not taken it may become endangered. Easter whip-poor-wills can be found in the Fathom Five Marine Park. They are distinguished by their medium size and brown and grey feathers that provide them with excellent camouflage so that they can blend in with the surroundings. The eastern whip-poor-will is generally found in open woodlands with mixed conifers and deciduous trees. Threats to the eastern whip-poor-will are directly caused by the loss and degradation of their habitat. From 1968-2007, the number of eastern whip-poor-wills has decreased by nearly 75% of its original population in Canada, and its population is gradually decreasing at a rate of 3.2% per year.

== Climate change ==
There is a very real threat associated with climate change on a global scale, but especially within Canada. According to current projections, the province of Ontario will experience an increase in average temperatures of 2.6-2.7 degrees Celsius by 2030 and 5.9-7.4 degrees Celsius by 2080. A further consequence of climate change will be an increase in precipitation by 4.5%-7.1% in Ontario and a possible increase of 3.2%-17.5% by 2080. It is anticipated that climate change could have dramatic effects on species such as the monarch butterfly, the massassauga rattlesnake, the eastern ribbon snake, and the eastern whip-poor-will, which are already on the endangered list. Increasing temperatures and precipitation will lead to more frequent flooding, droughts, and extreme weather events. Due to these impacts, there will be a drastic decrease in viable food sources for monarch butterflies, such as milkweed. It is anticipated that the flooding will negatively impact the landscapes in which massassauga rattlesnakes, eastern ribbon snakes, and eastern whip-poor-wills rely heavily on for shelter, food, and protection.

== Aquatic wildlife ==
=== Native aquatic wildlife ===
Lake Huron is home to 139 native fish species, many of which are found in Fathom Five Provincial park. Some examples include sculpins, gizzard shad, shiners, and ciscoes. These fish sustain populations of larger predatory species such as pike, muskellunge, large and smallmouth bass, brook trout, and walleye. These native species are dispersed throughout the great lakes watershed.

Lake Huron is also home to eight native turtle species, including the spotted turtle (Clemmys guttata), Blanding’s turtle (Emydoidea blandingii), spiny softshell turtle (Apalone spinifera), northern map turtle (Graptemys geographica), eastern musk turtle (Sternotherus odoratus), snapping turtle (Chelydra serpentina), midland painted turtle (Chrysemys picta marginata), and wood turtle (Glyptemys insculpta). Out of these species, two are listed as endangered, two are listed "threatened", and three species are of special concern. The reduction of coastal wetlands has greatly impacted turtles in Lake Huron, including the Bruce Peninsula. Fathom Five National park is home to several wetlands. These wetlands are critical habitat to sensitive species such as turtles, black terns, king rails, herons, Black crest night herons and other species of special concern.

=== Non-native aquatic wildlife ===
Lake Huron is home to several introduced and invasive species. Pacific salmon were introduced to Lake Huron; specifically, Chinook, coho and pink salmon were intentionally introduced by sport fishermen. Additionally, invasive species introduced via ballast water, man-made canals, aquaculture, and the pet trade have established large populations within the lakes. Lampreys, alewives, and quagga mussels are the most common examples of invasive species in the Great Lakes.

Invasive species have affected the lake ecosystem considerably. Quagga mussels are filter feeders, and filter water through their siphons in order to trap algae and plankton. These mussels are so prevalent that their filtration has drastically changed the clarity of the water, allowing algae to grow on rock structures on the lake bed where it would not previously be present. Predatory fish have also been affected greatly by invasive species. The clarity of the water, created by quagga mussels, causes ambush predators to be less successful in ambushing prey. Keystone native species such as lake trout, muskellunge, and pike have been greatly affected by this change. Large fish species have also been affected by the sea lamprey.

Lampreys are a parasitic predator, and attach themselves to large fish and feed on the blood of their prey. Lampreys are native to the Great Lakes; Silver, chestnut, American brook, and northern brook lamprey are native to streams and rivers in the watershed of the Great Lakes, including Lake Huron. Native lampreys are not large enough to have a significant effect on the fish they prey on, however invasive sea lampreys are much larger, and fish that they prey on are much more prone to die as they are not used to such large parasites. It was estimated that only one in seven fish preyed on by sea lampreys would survive.

== First Nations ==
Fathom Five National Marine Park is part of the traditional unceded territory of Saugeen Ojibway people. Oral history dates the presence of Saugeen Ojibway peoples around 5480 BCE. The peninsula is a spiritual destination for many Ojibway Nations, who would travel to the peninsula to partake in potlatches and ceremonies throughout the seasons. The traditional territory of the Saugeen Ojibway included the modern day towns of Collingwood, Arthur, Alliston, and Goderich, the watersheds of the Saugeen river, the Sauble river, the Wasaga river and the islands surrounding the Bruce peninsula. The Saugeen people speak a dialect of the Algonquin language.

=== Food security ===
Food security for the Saugeen Ojibway people has been an ongoing political issue. All the major fisheries are located on the Saugeen Ojibway people's region and it is their main source of food. The local fisheries have been dominated by big corporations. This food resource needs to have legal access by Saugeen Ojibway people granted by the government. Prior to European arrival the Saugeen Ojibway people's territory extended as far as Southern Ontario. This includes 6,500 km^{2} (2,500 sq mi) extending into southern Ontario, 500 km of shoreline and 10,000 km^{2} (3,900 sq mi) of Lake Huron, and harvesting rights on 930 hectares (2,300 acres) of a hunting reserve. Commercial food markets do exist around the region and are a 25 minute drive from the reserve. Though this creates a challenge for those with no access to a motor vehicle. The older demographic of the Saugeen Ojibway people expressed that there is a decline in the Lake Huron's whitefish population. The whitefish is symbolic of cultural and generational ceremonies for the Saugeen Ojibway people. It is a symbol of a successful harvest and the Saugeen Ojibway people have a ceremony where the "chief" summons the whitefish and appreciate the lake for providing them with source of food and livelihood. These are age old rituals that have been practiced since the 1800s where the Saugeen Ojibway people surrendered their land to the British crown.

=== Parks Canada and Saugeen Ojibway people ===
Parks Canada is a Federal agency that specializes in protection and conservation of national parks throughout Canada. The entity was formed to ensure the preservation of ecological indicators and species. The Giigoonyang (Fishes) project collaboration between Saugeen Ojibway people and Parks Canada. The collaboration is designed to combine indigenous knowledge about the land area with western technology. Researchers will use this to monitor and analyze fisheries data to forecast population growth or decline. This research is essential as it ensures food security for the Saugeen Ojibway people territory. Since it is their primary source that they rely on, this collaboration will benefit both parties involved. Since Parks Canada is a Federal agency, it will allow the Saugeen Ojibway people to make necessary progress in their legal demands for their food security and territory. A Federal agency is more likely to implement effective change in comparison to a provincial entity due to the hierarchal structure of the government agencies in Canada. The secondary goal of Parks Canada is to fill the knowledge gap they have with regards to Fathom Five National Marine Park's lake systems. Specific to fish migration and ecosystems that directly affect the fisheries industry. The main aim is to be able to create sustainable fishing practices in order to ensure Lake Huron's fish population.

== Shipwrecks ==
The park is home to several shipwrecks, many of which are used for scuba diving and some shallower ones are used for snorkelling.

The park also has three non-shipwreck dive sites, these are Dunks Point, Big Tub Lighthouse Point and The Anchor.

| Ship | Date of sinking | Type of ship | Ship Length | Notes |
|---|---|---|---|---|
| Arabia | October 1884 | Three-masted barque | 40.1 metres (132 ft) | Foundered off of Echo Island. |
| Avalon Voyager II | October 1980 | Motor ship | 41.2 metres (135 ft) | Served in the Newfoundland fish trade for 30 years, then it was used a floating restaurant in Kincardine. Stranded and burned by vandals when being relocated to Owen Sound. |
| Caroline Rose | 1990s | Schooner | 39.6 metres (130 ft) | Towed to Driftwood Cove by the Tobermory Marine Association to be used as a dive site. |
| Cascaden | October 1871 | Steamer | | Broken up over a large area. |
| Charles P. Minch | October 1892 | Three-masted schooner | 47.2 metres (155 ft) | Driven onto the rocks near Tecumseh Cove, Cove Island. |
| China | November 1883 | Two-masted schooner | | Wrecked on China Reef; parts of the ship are broken up. |
| City of Grand Rapids | October 1907 | Passenger steamer | | Burned and sunk. |
| Forest City | June 1904 | Steamer | 66 metres (217 ft) | Formerly a barge; sunk in June 1904, after hitting the east side of Bears Rump Island. |
| James C. King | November 1901 | | 53.4 metres (175 ft) | Wrecked while towing the W.L. Wetmore. |
| John Walters | November 1883 | Two-masted schooner | 32.9 metres (108 ft) | |
| Newaygo | November 1903 | Steam barge | 59.7 metres (196 ft) | |
| Niagara II | May 1999 | Sandsucker | 55.5 metres (182 ft) | Sunk by the Tobermory Maritime Association in May 1999 to be used as a dive site. |
| Philo Scoville | October 1889 | Three-masted schooner | 42.5 metres (139 ft) | Wrecked during a storm. |
| Points West | | Wooden guide | 9.7 metres (32 ft) | Intentionally sunk. |
| The Tugs | | Steam tugs | | Wreckage of four small steam tugs, Alice G, Robert K, John & Alex and one unidentified tug |
| Truellen | 1972 | Yacht | 12 metres (39 ft) | Wrecked on the Greenfield Shoal. It was salvaged, but it was found to be too badly damaged, so it was towed to the channel Cove and North Otter Islands to be used as a dive site. |
| Sweepstakes | September 1885 | Two-masted schooner | 36.3 metres (119 ft) | Damaged off Cove Island then towed to Big Tub Harbour, where it sank. |
| W.L. Wetmore | November 1901 | Steamer | 65.1 metres (214 ft) | Wrecked during a storm in November 1901. The site is known for the boiler, anchor, chain and rudder. |

== See also ==
- National Parks of Canada
- List of National Parks of Canada
- List of shipwrecks in the Great Lakes
