= Reighard =

Reighard may refer to:

People:

- Jacob Ellsworth Reighard (1861-1942), American zoologist

Other:

- 12529 Reighard, a minor planet discovered in 1998
