= Northern lamprey =

Northern lamprey is a common name that may refer to:

- Petromyzontidae, the family that includes all lampreys native to the northern hemisphere
  - Ichthyomyzon unicuspis, a species of lamprey native to North America
