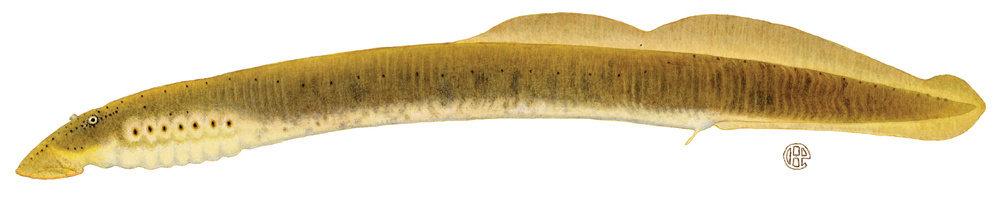

Conservation status
- Least Concern (IUCN 3.1)

- Apparently Secure (NatureServe)

Scientific classification
- Kingdom: Animalia
- Phylum: Chordata
- Infraphylum: Agnatha
- Class: Petromyzontida
- Order: Petromyzontiformes
- Family: Petromyzontidae
- Genus: Ichthyomyzon
- Species: I. greeleyi

Binomial name
- Ichthyomyzon greeleyi C. L. Hubbs & Trautman, 1937

Synonyms
- Ichthyomyzon hubbsi Raney 1952

= Mountain brook lamprey =

Species of jawless fish

The mountain brook lamprey or Allegheny brook lamprey (Ichthyomyzon greeleyi) is a lamprey found in parts of the Mississippi River basin as well as New York, Pennsylvania, Ohio, and in the Cumberland and Tennessee Rivers. This fish is jawless with a small sucker mouth and a long, eel-like body. It is fairly small in size, only growing to about 8 inches (20 cm) in length.

The mountain brook lamprey is a non-parasitic lamprey, meaning that they do not attach themselves to larger species of fish. The mountain brook lamprey is believed to have evolved from the parasitic Ohio lamprey (I. bdellium) and occurs, often in abundance, within many of the tributaries of the Ohio and Tennessee River systems. All non-parasitic lampreys require two distinctly different habitats that are connected by free flowing (free of dams) stretches of streams. Adults are found in clear brooks with fast flowing water and either sand or gravel bottoms. Juveniles or ammocoetes are found in slow moving water buried in soft substrate of medium to large streams. In the larval stage before metamorphosis, the lampreys feed on detritus and algae, and after they complete metamorphosis, they obtain energy from stored fat reserves. The spawning season for lampreys is from late April to early May.

== Geographic distribution ==
The mountain brook lamprey has a fragmented range in the Mississippi basin with populations being found in New York, Pennsylvania and adjacent areas of Ohio. Mountain brook lamprey are also found in the Cumberland and Tennessee Rivers in Tennessee, northern Alabama, Kentucky, and Virginia. In New York State, this lives in French Creek, and other northern and central parts of the Allegheny basin. The mountain brook lamprey is found in gravel riffles and sandy runs of clean, clear streams and in the sand, mud and debris in pools and backwaters. It spends its life in creeks without moving to larger rivers.

== Ecology ==
The general view is that lampreys do not feed during metamorphosis with the loss of body energy reserves being countered by water uptake. However, in the case of I. greeleyi, it is reasonable to assume metamorphosing animals do not feed but maintain body size by water uptake. This derives from measurements of oxygen consumption for ammocoetes of I. greeleyi (= I. hubbsi) by Hill and Potter (1970). Based on their measurements (9.5”C) and on energy concentration determined for I. gagei, the energy requirements for metamorphosis might be achieved without loss of body weight by increasing relative water content from 75 to 79–81%. Preliminary data indicate body water contents of 75.6 + 0.5 (n = 9), 76.22 0.7 (n = 14) and 76.8 + 0.9 (n = 13) for I. greeleyi in phases 1,3 and 4, respectively. By the completion of metamorphosis body water content increased to 79.4 rt 3.7% (n = 6), a value almost identical to that predicted from the earlier metabolic studies.

== Life history ==
Spawning occurs in late May when the water temperature reaches 18.9 °C (66.0 °F). The males build nests just above riffles in about 1 foot of water, and just downstream from a flat stone 6 to 12 inches (15 to 30 cm) in diameter. The male excavates the nest by removing small stones and pebbles, forming a depression about 2 inches (5.1 cm) deep and 8–10 inches (20–25 cm) in diameter with a fine gravel and sand bottom. Spawning occurs when a female moves over a nest and attaches to a rock. Spawning pairs stimulate other pairs to begin spawning. The mountain brook lamprey lives up to five or six years, and usually dies after spawning.

The post-embryonic life cycle of all lampreys includes a distinct larval or ammocoete and adult period. A juvenile period prior to the adult period is present in parasitic lampreys, but is absent in the nonparasitic or brook lampreys. The sedentary and phytophagous larval period of all lampreys is spent in the sandy silt substratum of cool streams. Coloration of live mountain brook lamprey did not change between the ammocoete and senescent periods and ranged from butterscotch to olive brown. The dorsal surface was generally darker than the lateral and ventral surfaces. Scattered dark pigment spots are present along the length of the dorsal-lateral surface. Metamorphosis commenced between early and mid-August. Time required for metamorphosis of the populations of mountain brook lamprey in Bent Creek, Cane Creek and Davidson River is estimated at 100–140 days.

== Management ==
Globally the status of I. greeleyi is "Apparently secure". Further, the short-term trend for the species complies with the stability of the species. However, in the long-term, there has been a 30–70% decline and some extirpation. In 10 states I. greeleyi is considered vulnerable, imperiled, or critically imperiled. The major cause of this decline is habitat destruction due to dams, pollution, and siltation.
