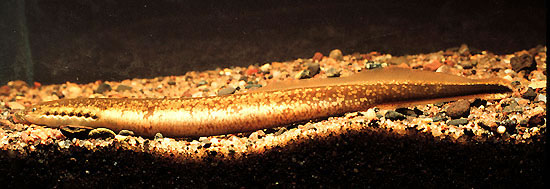
- Ichthyomyzon fossor

Scientific classification
- Kingdom: Animalia
- Phylum: Chordata
- Infraphylum: Agnatha
- Class: Petromyzontida
- Order: Petromyzontiformes
- Family: Petromyzontidae
- Genus: Ichthyomyzon; Girard, 1858

Type species
- Ichthyomyzon bdellium Jordan, 1885

Synonyms
- Ichthyomyzon (Reighardina) Creaser & Hubbs 1922; Reighardina (Creaser & Hubbs 1922); Scolecosoma Girard 1858

= Ichthyomyzon =

Genus of jawless fishes

Ichthyomyzon is a genus of lampreys in the family Petromyzontidae, native to North America.

== Species ==
There are currently six recognized species in this genus:

- Ichthyomyzon bdellium (D. S. Jordan, 1885) (Ohio lamprey)
- Ichthyomyzon castaneus Girard, 1858 (Chestnut lamprey)
- Ichthyomyzon fossor Reighard & Cummins, 1916 (Northern brook lamprey)
- Ichthyomyzon gagei C. L. Hubbs & Trautman, 1937 (Southern brook lamprey)
- Ichthyomyzon greeleyi C. L. Hubbs & Trautman, 1937 (Mountain brook lamprey)
- Ichthyomyzon unicuspis C. L. Hubbs & Trautman, 1937 (Silver lamprey)
