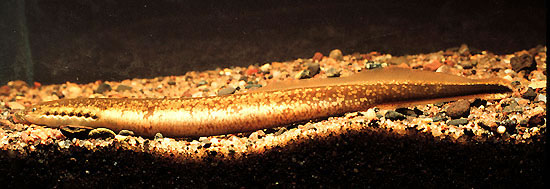

Conservation status
- Least Concern (IUCN 3.1)

- Apparently Secure (NatureServe)

Scientific classification
- Kingdom: Animalia
- Phylum: Chordata
- Infraphylum: Agnatha
- Class: Petromyzontida
- Order: Petromyzontiformes
- Family: Petromyzontidae
- Genus: Ichthyomyzon
- Species: I. fossor

Binomial name
- Ichthyomyzon fossor Reighard and Cummins, 1916

Synonyms
- Ammocoetes unicolor DeKay 1842; Ammocoetes borealis Agassiz 1850; Reighardina fossor (Reighard & Cummins 1916)

= Northern brook lamprey =

Species of jawless fish

The northern brook lamprey (Ichthyomyzon fossor) is a jawless freshwater fish in the family Petromyzontidae. It is closely related to the Silver lamprey (I. unicuspis) and may represent an ecotype of a single species with I. unicuspis.

== Description ==
Northern brook lampreys are jawless fishes, also known as cyclostomes. The species is also considered a non-parasitic lamprey. They have poorly developed "teeth" and a round, disc-like, subterminal mouth, called an oral-disc, and feed via suction. Northern brook lampreys have a single dorsal fin that continues along their entire length until it connects with the caudal fin. This dorsal fin can be notched as well. Their coloration is gray-brown dorsally with a light line down the back and an even lighter ventral side. The length of adult northern brook lampreys does not typically exceed 16 cm and the body is attenuate. While the ammocoetes look similar to the adult lampreys the ammocoetes have a hooded mouth instead of an oral-disc and no eyes.

== Geographic range ==
Northern brook lampreys can be found in most of the Midwest and northeast regions of the United States. They inhabit the Mississippi drainage basin in Wisconsin and the Lake Erie tributary in New York. They can be found in parts of Canada as well.

== Habitat ==
The northern brook lampreys are found in various habitats throughout their lives. Ammocoetes start off their lives burrowed beneath fine sediment or organic matter in quiet waters while the adults live in sand or gravel in swift moving waters. They are typically found in the headwaters of streams that are moderately warm and clean.

== Diet ==
As larve (ammocoetes), the northern brook lamprey are filter feeders; feeding primarily on detritus, zooplankton, algae, diatoms, bacteria, pollen and a host of other microorganisms as they remain burrowed in fine substrate in calm waters. The juveniles and adults have non-functional intestines and do not feed; juveniles drift for 4–6 months and the adults spawn and die shortly after spawning.

== Reproduction and life cycle ==
Spawning occurs around boulders and crevices of large rocks; 3–7 northern brook lamprey will build a nest together and then spawn in groups of 10–30. Once the eggs are fertilized they are often covered and left alone with no parental care given to the young, as the lamprey die soon after. Northern brook lampreys begin spawning at 6 years of age once they have reached sexual maturity. Spawning is triggered by the warming of the water in the spring. Males begin building nests and females lay between 1200 and 1524 eggs to combat high mortality rates of young.

Once the ammocoetes emerge from the eggs 2 weeks after fertilization, they spend the next 5–6 years feeding on algae and bacteria in burrows. They emerge in the fall as non-feeding juveniles after a 2–3 month metamorphosis and drift for 4–6 months until spawning begins. They then become sexually mature adults, partake in spawning and then die shortly thereafter.

== Conservation ==
Northern brook lamprey populations are decreasing in the great lakes area and the great lakes drainage basin from lampricides, habitat degradation, and added stressors. A study of Pennsylvania streams found that two of the six species of lampreys normally found breeding in the streams were not there. One of the species not found was the northern brook lamprey. It is speculated that the main reason for population decline is due to the presence of sea lamprey and the lampricides used to be rid of them. In Minnesota, northern brook lampreys are considered a special concern species as they are believed to be declining due to lampricide use and habitat degradation. The lampricide treatments are used in response to the invasive species, sea lampreys, that are currently plaguing the great lake region. The increasing populations of sea lampreys and the increasing use of lampricides in response to sea lampreys has had negative impacts on most populations of lampreys, including the northern brook lamprey.
