= Lake Michigan Triangle =

Area of Lake Michigan known for disappearances and maritime disasters

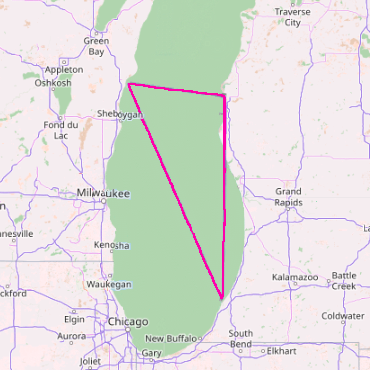
- Location: Lake Michigan, Michigan, United States
- Coordinates: 44°N 87°W

The Lake Michigan Triangle is, according to modern legends, an area of Lake Michigan where a number of disappearances, shipwrecks, and plane crashes have occurred under unexplained circumstances. Unidentified flying objects (UFOs) and unidentified submerged objects (USOs), have also allegedly been spotted in the area. The triangle stretches from Ludington to Manitowoc, down to Benton Harbor, and back to Ludington. The first major unexplained event was the disappearance of the French sailing ship Le Griffon and her crew in the 17th century. Starting with the sinking of the Thomas Hume In 1891, shipwrecks and disappearances became more frequent. This trend may be attributable to better record keeping or to increasing population in the area. The first reported UFO sighting was in 1913.

== Concept ==
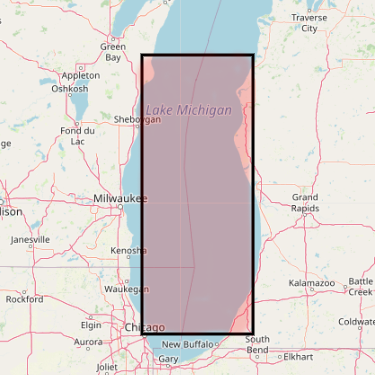
One alternative version

The frequency of disappearances, shipwrecks, and plane crashes within the Great Lakes was first mentioned in Jay Gourley's 1977 book, titled The Great Lakes Triangle. Although the exact origin of the Michigan Triangle is unknown, later authors focused on occurrences in Lake Michigan, particularly those within the bounds of the triangle.

Some experts have debated about the shape and range of the triangle. One argued that the area is not a triangle, but a rectangle, or oblong shape, that fills most or all of Lake Michigan.

The Lake Michigan Shipwreck Research Association claims that the triangle is a myth, contending that the triangle has no more shipwrecks than the rest of the Great Lakes. They also stated that the number of shipwrecks within the Great Lakes can be attributed to the high traffic over the lakes.

== Explanation attempts ==
=== Natural ===
Many of the shipwrecks and ship disappearances in Lake Michigan have been blamed on wind waves. Due to the lake's elongated shape and position, its shores are parallel and unimpeded, allowing the formation of dangerous currents including riptides and longshore tides. Additionally, the north-south orientation coupled with regular wind patterns allow waves to reach great heights.

Another common theory for the disappearances is magnetic anomalies caused by magnetic declination and magnetic deviation. Declination refers to the difference between true north and magnetic north, which differs depending on location. On average, Lake Michigan deviates four to five degrees westward. Deviations are errors induced in compasses by local magnetic fields. For example, if you were to hold a compass near a magnetic object, the needle would point towards the object instead of magnetic north. Although this would not be a problem in vehicles with other navigational equipment, it could cause confusion to inexperienced sailors and pilots.

=== Paranormal ===
Conspiracy theorists have blamed the triangle on a negative energy vortex. Energy vortexes are the idea that certain locations emit sacred, powerful, and transformational energy. Although vortexes are typically considered to promote positivity and healing, it's claimed that vortexes with negative-energy also exist. These locations are purportedly sources of danger and malevolence. Ley lines, areas that intersect ancient structures and landmarks, are often cited as causes of energy vortexes. According to ley line maps, one runs down the middle of Lake Michigan. Others attribute the triangle's supposed vortex to a prehistoric structure under Lake Michigan discovered by archaeologists in 2007. The site is often referred to as the "North American Stonehenge."

Others believe the occurrences in the Lake Michigan Triangle are caused by aliens, pointing to UFO sightings as evidence.

== Notable incidents ==
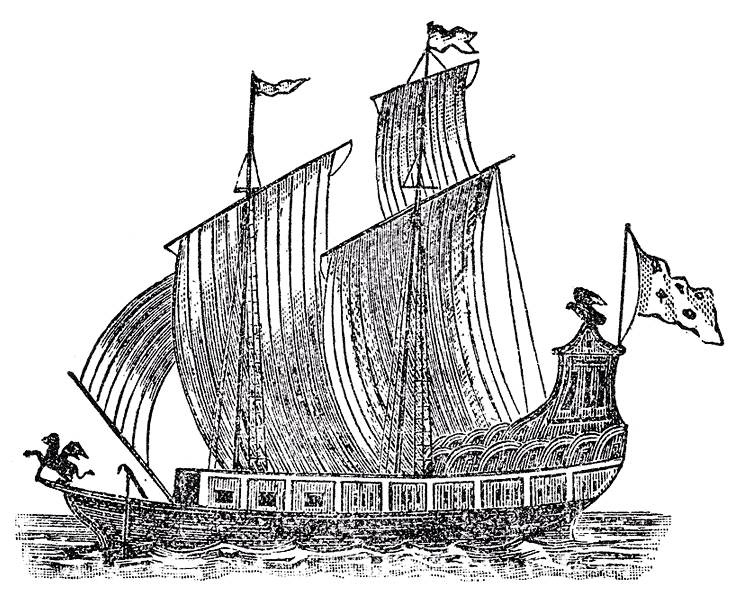
Woodcut of the Le Griffon

=== Le Griffon ===
One of the earliest known incidents in the Lake Michigan Triangle was the disappearance of the sailing ship Le Griffon and her crew on September 18, 1679. Le Griffon docked at La Grand Baie (present day Green Bay), loaded 12,000 pounds (5,400 kg) of fur, and set sail for Lake Erie. However, the vessel never arrived at her destination, and no confirmed remnants of the ship have ever been located. Some presume that Le Griffon perished in a storm. Others have theorized that the Ottawas or Pottawatomies boarded her, murdered her crew, and then set her ablaze. René-Robert Cavelier, Sieur de La Salle, the ship's builder, was convinced that the pilot and crew sunk the ship and made off with the fur. There is no substantial evidence for any of these theories.

=== Thomas Hume ===
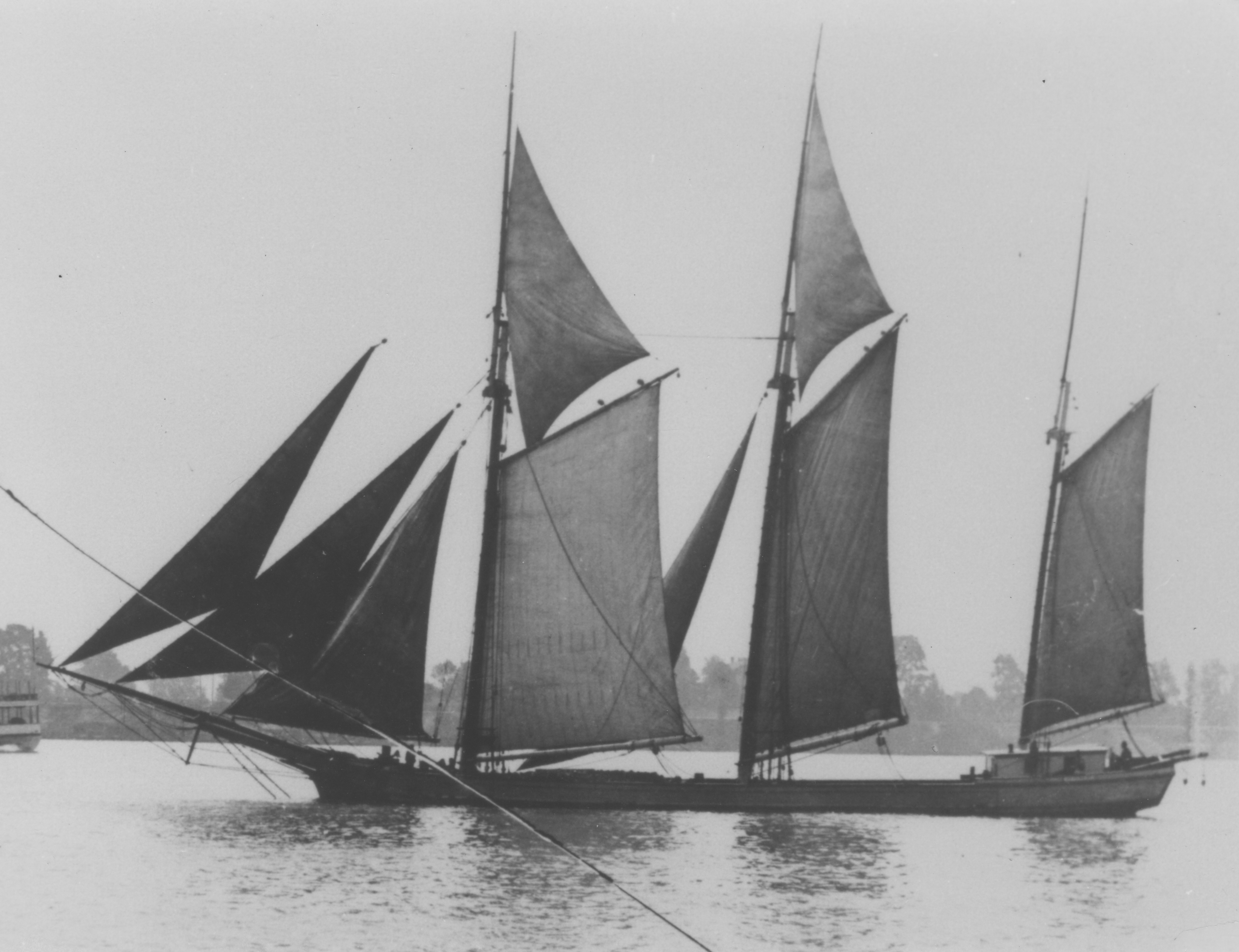
The Thomas Hume

On May 21, 1891, the schooners Thomas Hume and Rouse Simmons set off from the port after dropping a shipment of lumber in Chicago. Both ships were supposed to return to the Hackley-Hume Lumber mill in Muskegon, but after encountering a squall, the crew of the Rouse Simmons returned to Chicago until the weather improved. However, the Thomas Hume continued on, and disappeared along with the six sailors onboard. Hackley–Hume sent a vessel to search for the schooner and offered a $300 reward, but had no success in finding the ship. Theories arose as to what happened to the Thomas Hume, the most widely accepted being that she sank from the same storm that caused the Rouse Simmons to retreat to Chicago. Others, including Charles Hackley, believed that another boat collided with and sunk the schooner.

In 2006, an A and T Recovery employee discovered the sunken ship while searching for a lost United States Navy aircraft. She was found almost completely intact, preserved by cold water, 150 feet (46 m) below the surface. The Michigan Shipwreck Research Association concluded that the Thomas Hume had succumbed to a storm, stating that she was too intact to have been rammed into by another vessel.

=== Rosabelle ===
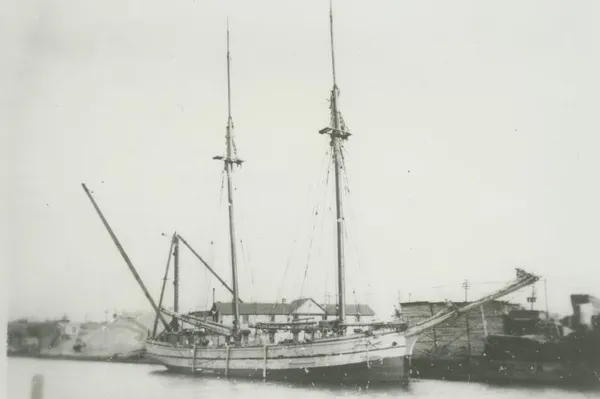
The Rosabelle in 1863

The Rosabelle was a two-masted schooner used to transport materials to the House of David in Benton Harbor. Between 1875 and 1926, she was found capsized twice in Lake Michigan, with no signs of her crews.

In 1875, a car ferry crossing the lake discovered the schooner floating upside down. The ten-man crew who departed with the boat were never found. The ship was then turned over and returned to her port in Milwaukee, where she remained in service.

In October 1921, the ship was ready to depart again with a load of potatoes and maple lumber. However, the ship's captain, Ed Johnson, refused to board the schooner. His son later stated that Johnson had a premonition that a disaster was about to occur. The crew could not convince Johnson to board the Rosabelle again, so they left without him. Days later, the ship was found capsized again, with no signs of her crew. The stern was missing, indicating that there was a collision, but no ship reported having an accident. The United States Coast Guard, which dragged the schooner into Racine Harbor, later determined that there was no collision.

=== George R. Donner ===
George R. Donner was the captain of the O.M. McFarland, a coal freighter. On April 28, 1937 – Donner's 58th birthday – the ship picked up 9,800 tons of coal in Erie, Pennsylvania, and then traveled west through the lakes, bound for Port Washington, Wisconsin. The captain had spent hours on the bridge directing the O.M. McFarland through ice floes. When they reached Lake Michigan, Donner retired to his cabin, instructing the crew to alert him once the ship neared her destination. Three hours later, when the vessel neared Port Washington, the second mate went to Donner's cabin but found that it had been locked from the inside. Assuming Donner had gone to the galley for a snack, he went to the galley but to no avail. The crew then began an extensive search for their captain, but it was futile. They eventually broke down the door to the cabin but didn't find Donner. Donner was too large to fit through the two portholes in his room, and showed no signs of depression or suicidal thoughts. Local ports and ships searched for Donner in the water, but no sign of him was ever found.

=== Flight 2501 ===
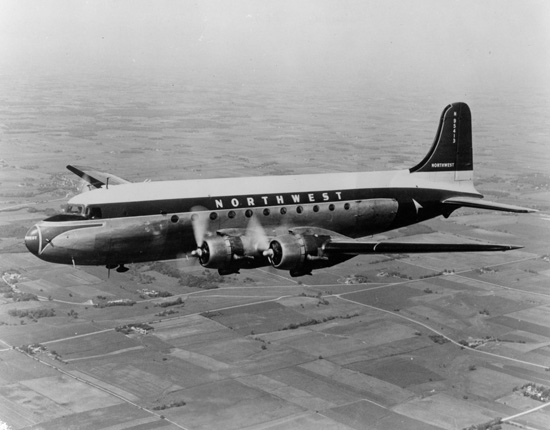
Similar aircraft

On the evening of June 23, 1950, Northwest Orient Airlines Flight 2501, carrying 55 passengers and three crew, left the LaGuardia Airport in New York City for Minneapolis. Although a preflight review of the weather revealed thunderstorms and possible squalls along the route of the flight, it was not a great concern to the crew. However, to avoid turbulence, Captain Robert Lind requested to descend to an altitude of 4,000 feet instead of his assigned 6,000 feet. As the aircraft approached Cleveland, Ohio, Lind repeated the same request, and it was approved that time. After severe turbulence caused another plane to fall 500 feet while flying over Lake Michigan, Air Traffic Control (ATC) instructed Lind to descend to 3,500 feet to avoid a collision with the other aircraft, to which Lind obliged. Later, Lind and his copilot decided to steer south in an attempt to avoid storm activity. However, they inadvertently flew directly into a squall line. At 11:13 p.m., the plane made their last radio transmission, requesting to descend to 2,500 feet. The request was likely made because the crew wanted to drop below the clouds and obtain more visual clarity. However, ATC did not grant them clearance because another plane was departing from Milwaukee at that time.

Shortly afterwards, locals between Benton Harbor and South Haven reported hearing an aircraft flying low to the ground before witnessing a flash of light over the lake. Some witnesses reporting hearing an explosion, although it was hard to differentiate the sound from the thunder clouds. By midnight, radio operatives realized that the plane was missing. The next day, the Coast Guard discovered an oil slick and partial debris approximately 18 miles (29 km) northwest of Benton Harbor. In the following days, the search resulted in the discovery of human remains such as ears, hands, and bones, a seat armrest, and pieces of upholstery. A pair of child's pants, later identified as those of 8-year-old passenger Chester Schaeffer, were also found. Officials needed to temporarily close certain beaches due to the amount of debris washing ashore. However, searchers have never been able to find any sizable amount of the plane or its engines. Most of the debris found was no larger than a person's hand.

Authorities assume the aircraft crashed into Lake Michigan. Evidence recovered suggests that the plane likely hit the water in a forward, downward, to-the-left trajectory at a high velocity. What caused the plane to crash has never been determined. The most commonly accepted explanation is that it was the result of bad weather conditions and the pilots' lack of visual clarity. Another theory is that the plane was struck by lightning, causing it to explode. However, none of the debris recovered had burn marks. Conspiracy theorists have suggested that the plane was taken by a UFO, citing that two police officers in the area saw red lights hovering over the lake for two hours after the plane disappeared.

=== Don Schaller and Don Rodriguez ===
On July 3, 1998, Donald Schaller flew a two-seat Aero L-39 Albatros, a high-performance single-engine jet often used as a military trainer by Eastern European countries. Schaller, a veteran pilot, was planning on participating in his first air show for the National Cherry Festival in Traverse City, Michigan. In the passenger seat was Donovan Rodriguez, a flight instructor at Northwestern Michigan College since the 1970s. At approximately 6 p.m., Schaller radioed that he was 27 miles (43 km) from the Cherry Capital Airport, where he departed from, and was planning to return to the airport. Soon afterwards, flight controllers noticed that the jet vanished from radar, and they were unable to make contact with Schaller. Coast Guard helicopters quickly began searching the area, but found nothing. The following day, a Canadian cargo plane and the Blue Angels' C-130 "Fat Albert" joined the search. Despite scouring miles of land and water, no clues were found, and the search ended on July 9.

The cause of the disappearance was never determined. Michigan State Police believe the aircraft crashed into Lake Michigan, but are unsure what caused this to happen. The weather was calm that day, both men were experienced pilots, and the aircraft was considered to be simple and reliable. The plane was also equipped with parachutes and ejection seats, although it's unknown if the seats were functional. One witness reported hearing a plane flying overhead and then a loud, firework-like sound. However, he never saw a plane.

Later that year, an underwater search was conducted using sonar technology. It uncovered a 30-foot (9.1 m) long object that searchers believed to be the plane. The following year, divers confirmed that the object was a rock formation. In 2008, another sonar search discovered a possible plane approximately 450 feet (140 m) below the surface. It was next to a boat that sank in the 1950s. However, a dive could not be completed to confirm if the object was a plane, as the diver was not certified past 400 feet.

== See also ==
- Graveyard of the Great Lakes
- List of shipwrecks in the Great Lakes
- Marysburgh vortex

== Bibliography ==
- Soucek, Gayle (2022). Lake Michigan Triangle, The: Mysterious Disappearances and Haunting Tales (illustrated ed.). Arcadia Publishing. ISBN 9781467148399.
