= George A. Marsh =

Three-masted schooner sunk in Lake Ontario

Coordinates: 44°07′36.59″N 76°36′10.08″W

History
- Name: George A. Marsh
- Completed: 1887
- Fate: Sank 8 August 1917

General characteristics
- Type: Schooner
- Tonnage: 174.87 GRT
- Length: 36 m (118 ft)
- Beam: 9.4 m (31 ft)
- Height: 2.7 m (8.9 ft)

George A. Marsh was a three-masted schooner built in Michigan City Indiana in 1882 as a lumber carrier. In 1914, the Marsh was sold to a Belleville, Ontario man as a coal carrier.

The Marsh met her demise on August 8, 1917, when she sank during a storm, with a loss of twelve of the fourteen crew (and including seven children between the ages of one and thirteen).

Many wrecks explored by Save Ontario Shipwrecks are not fully intact, unlike the George A. Marsh (1882) a three masted schooner, which sank on August 8, 1917, during a summer gale off Amherst Island near Kingston, Ontario The wreck of the Marsh rests upright and very intact in Lake Ontario, in roughly 80 feet of water.

== See also ==
- Marysburgh vortex
