= Sweepstakes (schooner) =

Canadian Great Lakes ship sunk in 1885

Coordinates: 45°15′19″N 81°40′50″W

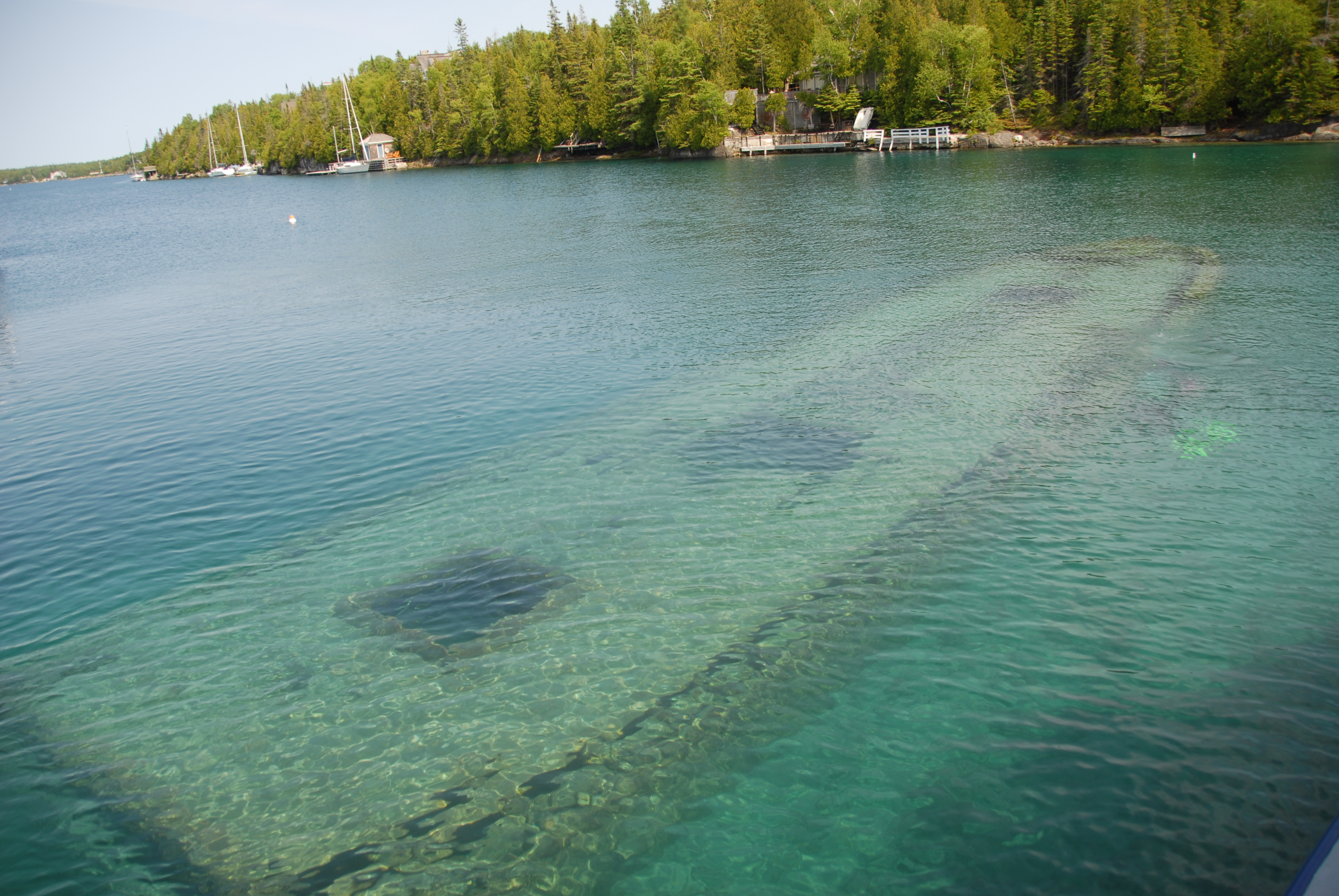
- The wreck of the Sweepstakes in Lake Huron

History

Canada
- Name: Sweepstakes
- Builder: Melancthon Simpson
- In service: 1867
- Fate: Sank at Big Tub Harbour in September 1885

General characteristics
- Type: schooner
- Tonnage: 218 GRT
- Length: 119 ft (36 m)
- Beam: 23 ft (7.0 m)
- Depth of hold: 10 ft (3.0 m)

Sweepstakes (also known as Sweeps) was a Canadian schooner built in Burlington, Ontario, in 1867. It was damaged off Cove Island, then towed to Big Tub Harbour in the Georgian Bay of Lake Huron, where it sank in September 1885. The remains of Sweepstakes lie in Big Tub Harbour, in the Fathom Five National Marine Park, in Tobermory, Ontario. The schooner is said to be one of the most popular of several wrecks in the park, and it is often visited by tour boat passengers, divers, and snorkelers.

== Construction ==
Sweepstakes was built in Burlington, Ontario, in 1867, by Melancthon Simpson. The two-masted wooden schooner's length was 36.3 metres (119 ft 1 in) and the hull's maximum depth was 7 m (23 ft 0 in). The schooner was measured at 218 GRT. Sweepstakes was last owned by George Stewart, who lived in Mooretown, Ontario.

== Sinking ==
Damaged off Cove Island in August 1885, Sweepstakes was then towed to the head of Big Tub Harbour, in the Fathom Five National Marine Park, in Tobermory, Ontario, by the tugboat Jessie. The schooner suffered serious damage and was not repaired in time, causing it to sink in September 1885. Sweepstakes was transporting coal, and the coal was retrieved after the boat sank.

== Shipwreck ==
Sweepstakes's wreck is considered well preserved as the hull remains intact. Sweepstakes is located approximately 46 metres (50 yd) from the head of Big Tub Harbour and remains in the water at a depth of 6.1 metres (20 ft). The bow area of the boat contains the windlass and portions of the starboard railings remain undamaged. The stern name-board has been removed and currently is on display at the Bruce County Museum in Southampton. In the middle of the schooner is the center-board box, with the centerboard inside. This extends from keel to deck. The aft-deck of Sweepstakes has collapsed, causing the stern-post to fall, where it now lies on the bottom of Big Tub Harbour. The Fathom Five National Marine Park has made repairs to the slowly deteriorating schooner to keep the deck from collapsing. Although Sweepstakes deteriorates a little more each year, it is said to be one of the best preserved 19th century Great Lakes schooners that has been found and is considered one of the most popular shipwrecks in the Fathom Five National Marine Park. Nearby is another popular visited shipwreck, City of Grand Rapids. The schooner gives a good depiction of what a typical Great Lakes schooner looked like.

== See also ==
- List of shipwrecks in the Great Lakes
