= Conestoga (ship) =

Coordinates: 44.7810°N 75.3785°W

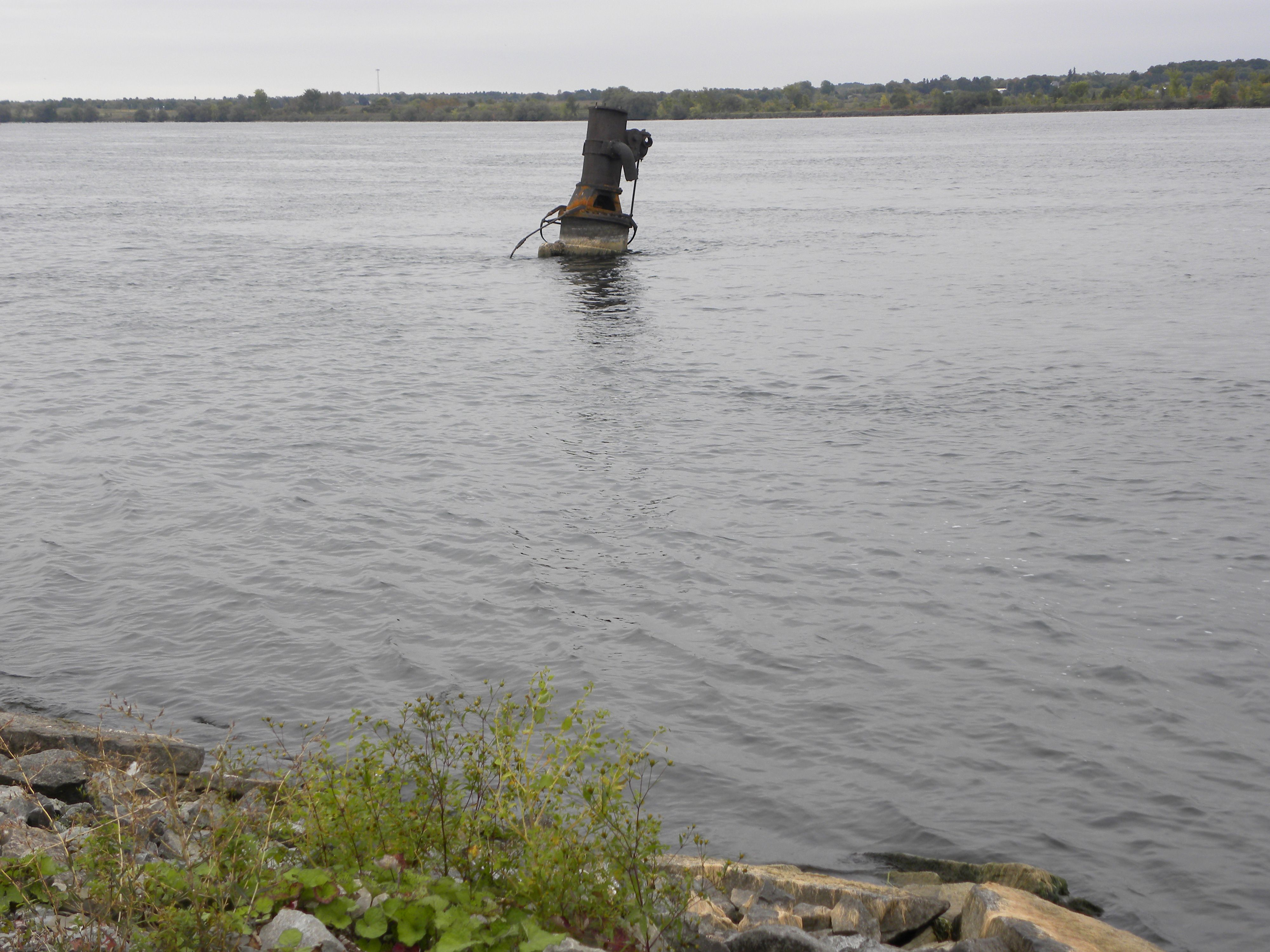

History

United States
- Name: Conestoga
- Builder: Quale & Son, Cleveland
- Launched: July 6, 1878
- Fate: Sank May 22, 1922

General characteristics
- Type: Iron clad wooden steam freighter
- Tonnage: 1,226 gross tons
- Length: 253 ft (77 m)
- Beam: 36 ft (11 m)
- Propulsion: Steam, steeple compound engine
- Speed: 8 knots (15 km/h; 9.2 mph)

Conestoga was an iron-clad wooden steam freighter constructed in 1878. In 1922, Conestoga caught fire at Cardinal, Ontario and sank.

== Description ==
Conestoga was 253 feet (77 m) long with a beam of 36 feet (11 m) and a draft of 16 feet (4.9 m). Conestoga had a 16-foot (4.9 m) hold.

== Construction and career ==
The freighter was built in Cleveland, Ohio by Quale & Son for the Anchor Line of Erie, Pennsylvania. The vessel was launched on July 6, 1878. On May 22, 1922, while awaiting passage through the Galop Canal Lock 28 (Old Galop Canal), a fire started in Conestoga's engine room. The ship was flushed away from the lock and drifted downstream, where it burned to its waterline and sank. There was no loss of life and its cargo of 30,000 bushels of wheat was salvaged.

Conestoga is now a popular wreck dive where it sank in the Saint Lawrence River south of Cardinal, Ontario. It rests at a depth of 22–25 feet (6.7–7.6 m) and is about 75 ft (23 m) from shore. The upper portion of the steeple engine protrudes above the river, marking the site.
