= Marysburgh vortex =

Area in Lake Ontario known for shipwrecks

Coordinates: 44.1°N 76.8°W

The Marysburgh Vortex is an area of eastern Lake Ontario with a history of shipwrecks during the age of sail and steam which has encouraged legends, superstitions and comparisons to the Bermuda Triangle. The name describes an area whose three corners are Wolfe Island, Mexico Bay near Oswego, New York, and Point Petre in Prince Edward County, Ontario. As many as 500 ships and 40 aircraft have been lost in the vortex.

Although many legends suggest mysterious circumstances for the sinkings, historical writers have attributed the area's record of shipping disasters to conventional maritime hazards such as bad weather, shifting cargoes, fires, submerged reefs exposed during periods of low water levels, and compass errors due to natural geomagnetic anomalies.

== History ==
Ships lost in the area are said to number at least 100, including the vessels Bavaria (1889), George A. Marsh (1917), Eliza Quinlan (1883) and Star of Suez (1964). The term "Marysburgh Vortex" was coined by Toronto writer Hugh F. Cochrane in his 1980 book Gateway To Oblivion in which he proposed "an unknown invisible vortex of forces" as the cause of the maritime disasters, however reviewers criticized Cochrane's work, saying, "His own reconstructed accounts of accidents are the worst kind of speculative history of the "you are there" variety". Because of the relatively large number of sunken wrecks in Lake Ontario, the area within the Marysburgh Vortex is popular with recreational divers.
