= Cardinal, Ontario =

Cardinal
- Unincorporated community
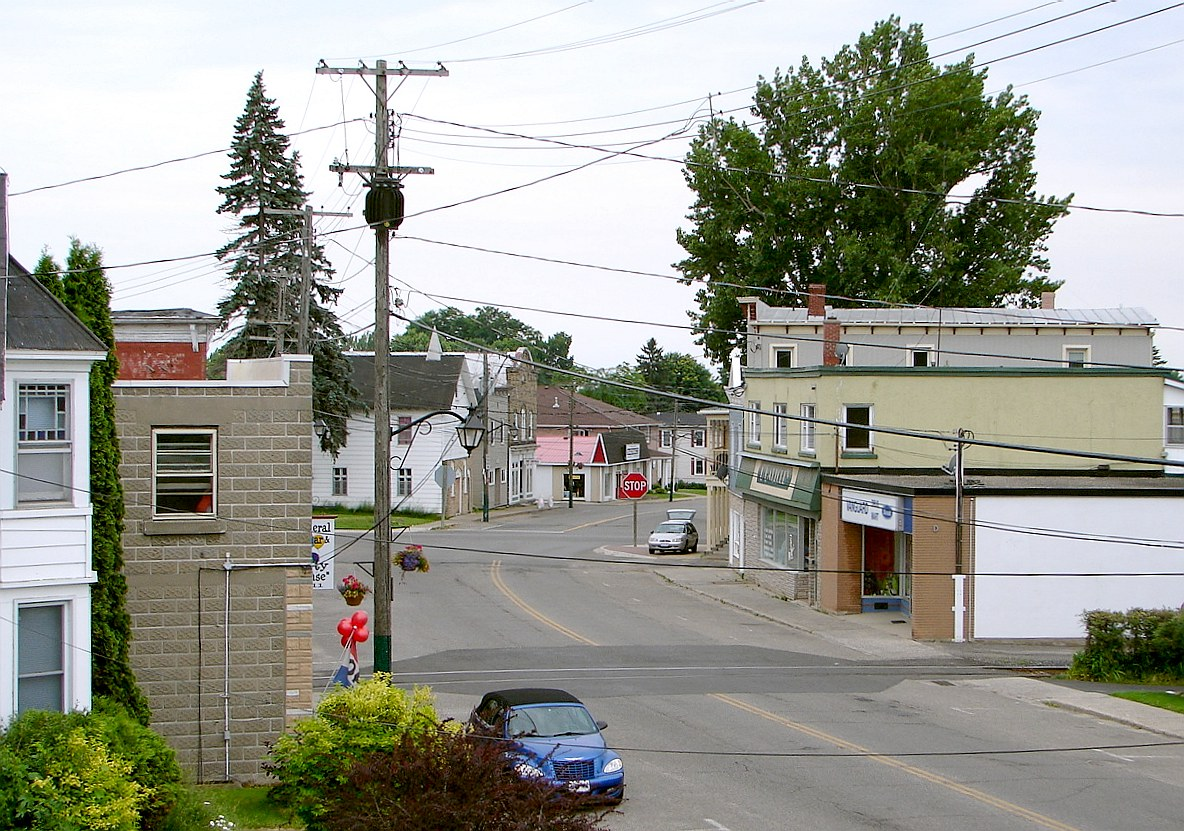

- Location within Southern Ontario
- Coordinates: 44°47′26″N 75°22′56″W
- Country: Canada
- Province: Ontario
- County: Leeds and Grenville
- Municipality: Edwardsburgh/Cardinal
- Settled: 1790s
- Incorporated: 1878
- Dissolved (amalgamated): 1 January 2001

Area
  - Land: 2.44 km^{2} (0.94 sq mi)

Population (2021)
  - Total: 1,770
  - Density: 724.9/km^{2} (1,877/sq mi)
- Time zone: UTC-5 (EST)
  - Summer (DST): UTC-4 (EDT)
- Postal code: K0E 1E0
- Area code: 613

Cardinal is a community located in the township of Edwardsburgh/Cardinal, Ontario, Canada. Situated along the St. Lawrence River, between the towns of Iroquois to the east and Johnstown to the west, Cardinal has over 1700 residents.

Prior to being incorporated in 1878, the village was referred to by numerous names, including: Edwardsburgh, Point Cardinal, Munro's Point, Elgin, and Port Elgin. During the late 1700s, Hugh Munro acquired land at the site which would later become Cardinal. Upon seeing the Galops Rapids, Munro saw potential for water power, which could become profitable. According to General Simcoe's documents, by 1794 Munro had established a saw and grist mill on his property. By 1864, Cardinal's business concerns included the McLatchie foundry and the Canada Starch Works.

From 1878 to 2001, Cardinal was an incorporated village municipality. On January 1, 2001, it was merged with the Township of Edwardsburgh to form the new Township of Edwardsburgh/Cardinal.

== History ==
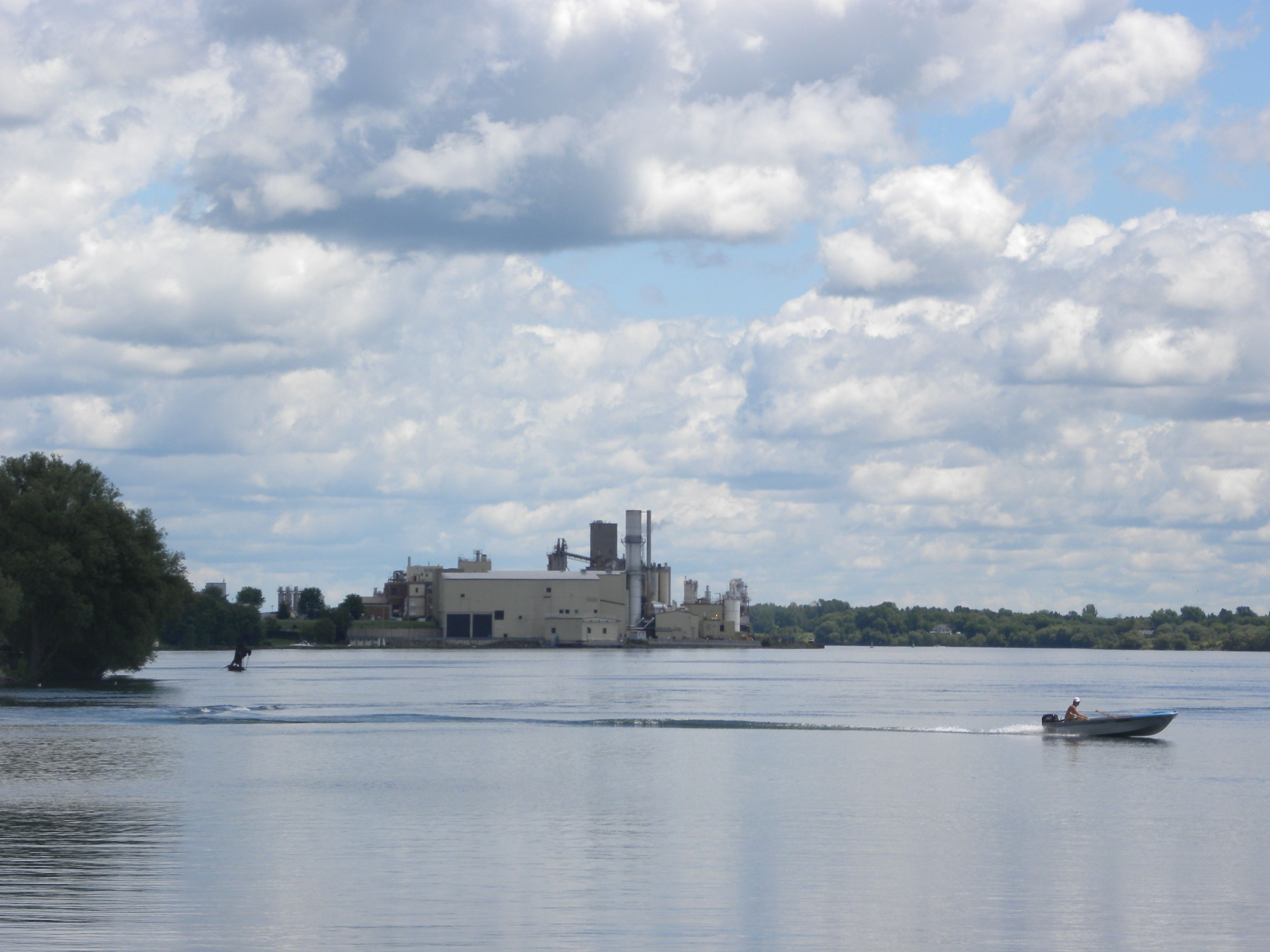
Ingredion Plant, Cardinal

=== 1700s–1899 ===
The village of Cardinal was founded by Captain Hugh Munro in the late 1700s. Many unfortunate events in Munro's life led to his settlement in Cardinal. After the death of his Major, Munro was held responsible for large debts incurred by supplying the soldiers with necessities. After joining the Loyalists, Munro was injured in the American Revolutionary War and saddled with more debt after supplying troops out of pocket. Munro petitioned the government for compensation, and it is believed he was granted the land in present-day Cardinal as a result. The land at Cardinal had much potential in the 1700s due to the adjacent river and the construction of Ontario Highway 2 through the village in 1790. The river provided a means of transportation and power while the highway led to increased traffic to the area, as it was the primary route between Montreal and Kingston. By 1794, Munro had constructed a saw and grist mill which the community subsequently grew around.

In the early-1800s, Cardinal began to grow as a village as more settlers arrived and businesses began operations. Another sawmill and a general store were established. A large dock was built for a timber business, which shipped timber on rafts to Montreal. In 1843, the village's post office was erected. Before the Galop Canal was constructed in 1846, early settlers earned an income hauling boats through the rapids. Some residents relied on agriculture for their income, and maintained family farms.

By the mid-19th century Cardinal began to develop further, as the Galop Canal had been fully constructed to allow easy passage through the rapids and a Grand Trunk Railway line was laid through the community, connecting it with Toronto. A train station was built shortly after the tracks were laid, called Edwardsburg Station. By 1851, the population had grown to around 120 individuals. Several businesses opened mid-century, including three more general stores, a blacksmith, a tailor, a gunsmith, two shoemakers, a cloth factory, a library, a carpentry shop and two inns. Additionally, this period was the beginning of the Canada Starch Company.

During the late-1800s, the community prospered further, as more businesses opened and the population steadily increased. In 1871, the population had reached 300. By the 1870s, the village was home to an additional three general stores, a machinist, a milliner, two blacksmiths, eight tradesmen, five churches, a carriage shop, a doctor and a telegraph operator in addition to its original businesses and tradespeople. In 1878, the village was officially incorporated and renamed Cardinal.

By 1895, the population of Cardinal had reached 1,000. New businesses at this time included a drug store, three barbers, a bakery, a jewellery shop, a cheese factory, a butcher shop, an undertaker and several others.

== Demographics ==
Historical census populations – Cardinal (population centre)

| Year | Pop. | ±% |
|---|---|---|
| 1891 | 959 | — |
| 1901 | 1,378 | +43.7% |
| 1911 | 1,111 | −19.4% |
| 1921 | 1,241 | +11.7% |
| 1931 | 1,319 | +6.3% |
| 1941 | 1,645 | +24.7% |
| 1951 | 1,782 | +8.3% |

| Year | Pop. | ±% |
|---|---|---|
| 1956 | 1,994 | +11.9% |
| 1961 | 1,944 | −2.5% |
| 1966 | 1,947 | +0.2% |
| 1971 | 1,865 | −4.2% |
| 1976 | 1,867 | +0.1% |
| 1981 | 1,753 | −6.1% |
| 1986 | 1,639 | −6.5% |

| Year | Pop. | ±% |
|---|---|---|
| 1991 | 1,552 | −5.3% |
| 1996 | 1,777 | +14.5% |
| 2001 | 1,739 | −2.1% |
| 2006 | 1,785 | +2.6% |
| 2011 | 1,690 | −5.3% |
| 2016 | 1,717 | +1.6% |
| 2021 | 1,770 | +3.1% |

Population figures prior to 2001 are for Cardinal Village. Population counts are not adjusted for boundary changes.
Source: Statistics Canada

== Churches ==
As of 2025, Cardinal is home to four active churches: a United, Anglican, Roman Catholic and Pentecostal Church.

Three other churches were once located in the village throughout its history, all of which were Methodist churches. These churches were the Wesleyan-Methodist Church, the Episcopal Methodist Church, and the Free Methodist Church.

The first Presbyterian church was constructed in 1826, slightly north of the site of the current Presbyterian church on Dundas Street. The Presbyterian congregation had existed for a year prior to the church's construction. The first church was a small, stone church with only one room. In 1877, the church was replaced by a larger brick building complete with a spire. In 1911, the church caught fire after being struck by lightning, and the spire was destroyed and replaced with the current tower. At the church's centennial in 1925 the building was renovated and given the name St. Andrew's Presbyterian. In 1967 the church in Mainsville amalgamated with St. Andrew's becoming St. Andrew's and St. James’ Presbyterian Church. An addition was added to the church in 1997. In 2017, the church closed operations in Cardinal and joined up with Knox Presbyterian Church in Iroquois, Ontario.

The first St. Paul's Anglican Church building was located along Highway 2, east of the village. The stone church was constructed around 1827 and was then known as St. Paul's Edwardsburgh. The land surrounding the church became a designated cemetery shortly following construction. In 1872, the building was deemed unsafe and was replaced at a new location, the corner of John and New Street. The old church was demolished, and the stones were used to erect a stone cairn on the site which it once stood. The new brick church was built with a parish hall. In 1958, an addition was added to the hall. As of 2025, this church is still operating.

The Sacred Heart Roman Catholic Church was built in 1875 on land donated by G.W. Benson. The church is located on the northeast corner of John and Middle Street. The building was designed by James Dowsley, measuring 50 by 36 ft (15 by 11 m) and constructed of brick. In 1923, the church became a parish, and a rectory was purchased. The church has gone many renovations since its construction, most of which being repairs or modernizations. In 1992, the church purchased a nearby home and demolished it in order to construct a new rectory and church office on site. As of 2025, this church is still in use.

The Methodist congregation in Cardinal has been represented under a variety of names. The first Methodist churches were Episcopal Methodist and Wesleyan-Methodist churches, both constructed of stone. The Episcopal church was built on Dundas Street in 1851 and the Wesleyan-Methodist was located a mile west of the village on Highway 2. In 1883, the two Methodist congregations amalgamated, and a new church was needed to accommodate the new, larger congregation. Ten years later, in 1893, the church was constructed of red brick along Dundas Street. In 1925, the church became known as St. John's United Church after entering into a church union. This church is still in use.

Some members of the Wesleyan-Methodist church became the Holiness Movement Church around 1900, and a new frame church was built in 1910 for the congregation. In 1956, a granite block building was built at the corner of Gill Street and Shanly Road to replace the frame church. In 1959, the Holiness Movement Church became the Free Methodist Church after a church union. This church operated into the late 1990s; after its closure it was converted into apartments.

In 1934, Cardinal became home to a Pentecostal congregation. Church meetings were held in a variety of locations before a church was constructed along Highway 2 during the late-1990s, the new building officially opened its doors in 2005. The Pentecostal congregation met at the Orange Hall, followed by the local machine shop before purchasing the former telephone office on Dundas Street in 1941. Land was purchased by the congregation in 1997 to become the site of a new church. The purchased lot was the site of an apple orchard which the congregation tended to; the apples were sold to raise money for the church's construction. The church, originally known as the Philadelphia Pentecostal Tabernacle, now known as Cardinal Community Church is still in operation as of 2025.

== Cemeteries ==
Cardinal is home to a total of six denominational cemeteries, two of which are no longer in use. Outside the village to the east are four cemeteries sitting on lots next to one another; these cemeteries are Roman Catholic, Anglican, Methodist and Presbyterian. The other two cemeteries are the old Presbyterian and Methodist cemeteries, located behind the Presbyterian Church within the village.

The old Presbyterian Cemetery located within the village was established in 1827 and was also used by Methodists. In the mid-1880s, a ship carrying immigrants arrived in the area which had experienced a cholera epidemic on board; numerous immigrants were buried in the southern part of the cemetery in an unmarked area who died shortly after their arrival. In 1897, the cemetery was closed and relocated when the canal to the north of the cemetery was dug. Many of the bodies and stones from the old cemetery were relocated to the new cemetery, and many unmarked graves were discovered in the process and also moved. A few graves still remain on site.

The relocated Presbyterian and Methodist cemeteries are located east of the village of Cardinal along Highway 2 and the Saint Lawrence River. The Methodist and Presbyterian congregations split on the purchase of a lot of land to be used as two new cemeteries in 1897 when the old cemetery was closed. The cemeteries are divided by a gravel driveway down the centre of the lot. After the 1920s, the Methodist Cemetery became known as the United Church Cemetery. These cemeteries are both still in use.

The Anglican Cemetery was established in 1827, upon the construction of the former Anglican church on Highway 2 along the Saint Lawrence River. In the mid-1880s, some of the bodies from the aforementioned cholera epidemic were buried behind the cemetery's vault. In 1891, the cemetery vault was presented to the Anglican church by W.T. Benson, with an agreement that any revenue coming from the vault be used to benefit the church or cemetery. The vault was used by all Cardinal's congregations. The Anglican Cemetery is still in use as of 2016.

The Roman Catholic cemetery, known as Sacred Heart Cemetery, was erected in 1892. Prior to this, Roman Catholics were buried in nearby Prescott or Dixon's Corners. The cemetery is located along Highway 2 and the Saint Lawrence River, between the Anglican cemetery and the Presbyterian and Methodist cemeteries. As of 2016, this cemetery is still in use.

== Shipwrecks ==
The Saint Lawrence river in Cardinal is home to two sunken ships which are popular dive sites for tourists and locals. Both shipwrecks are also visible from land, as the water is shallow enough that both ships are partially exposed above the water. Conestoga was an iron-clad, wooden steam freighter built in Cleveland in the 19th century, and launched on July 6, 1878. The ship was around 77 m (253 ft) in length with a speed of 8 knots (15 km/h; 9.2 mph). Conestoga was awaiting passage through lock 28 at the Galop Canal on May 22, 1922, when a fire broke out in the engine room. All passengers managed to escape and the ship's cargo was also salvaged, however the ship itself was flushed downstream from the locks where it eventually sank about 75 ft (23 m) from the shoreline. Conestoga rests at a depth of only 22–25 ft (6.7–7.6 m), with the top portion of the steeple engine protruding above the river. According to divers, the wooden portions of the Conestoga site are well preserved, however the top portions of metal are badly ice-damaged and rusted, and are quickly deteriorating. Looters and "wreck-stripping" has apparently caused significant damage to the site, and a blade from Conestoga's 14 ft (4.3 m) propeller was broken off by a dynamite blast during a salvage attempt gone wrong.

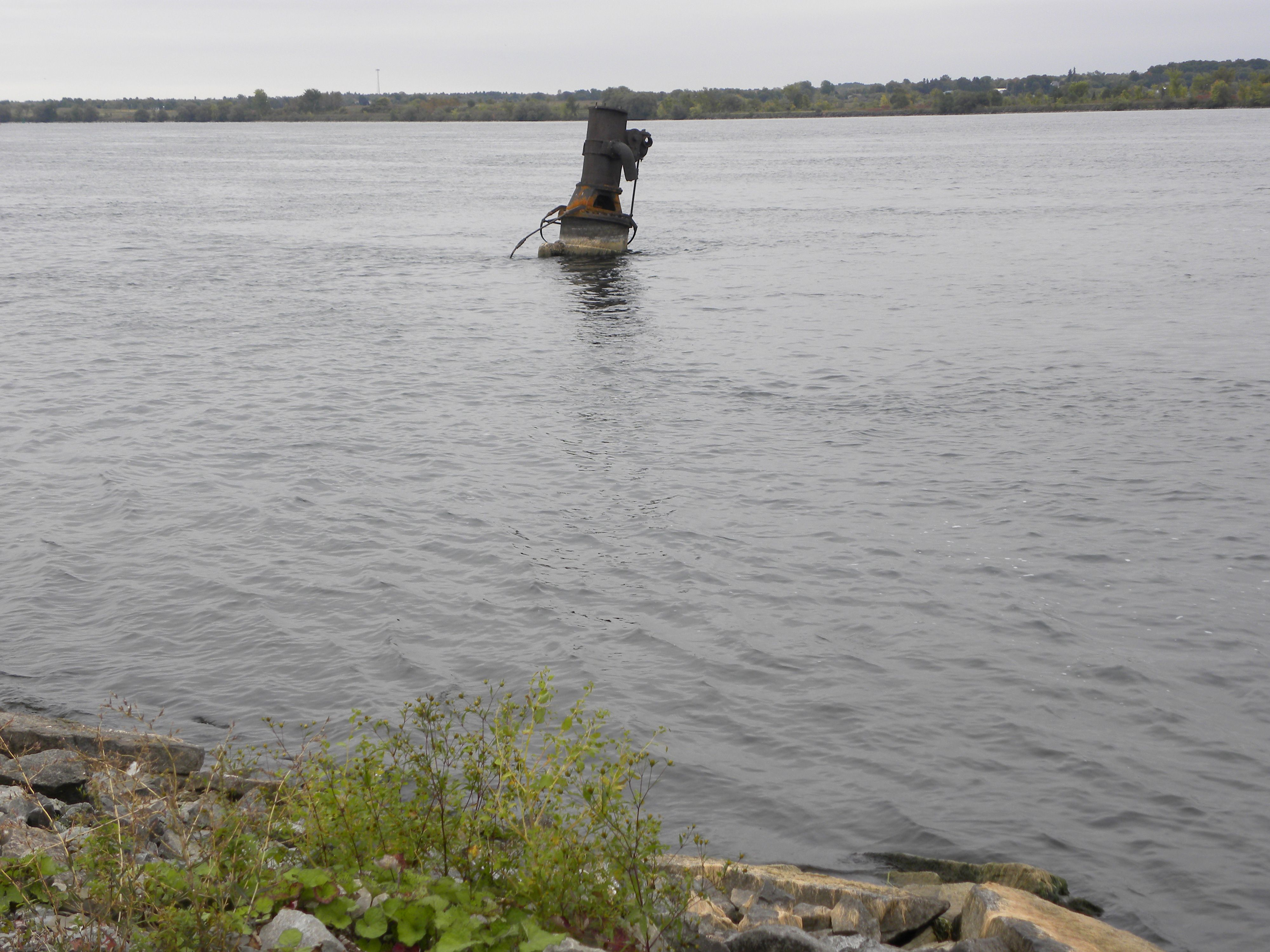
Wreck of the Conestoga peeks above the water in the Galop Canal

Weehawk was launched out of Camden, New Jersey, on December 12, 1926, where it operated as a ferry along the New England coast for many years. Weehawk was 45 m (148 ft) long and could carry around 500 passengers as well as around 30 cars. Eventually the boat was moved to the lock at Galop Canal in the 1960s, where it was purchased along with its sister ship by a local welder who had the intention of disassembling them both and selling the metal as scrap. A family tragedy prevented the welder from ever completing the deconstruction of both ships and the abandoned Weehawk eventually sank to the bottom of the canal. All that remains of the ship is half of its hull which is tipped over onto its side, with part of its skeleton sticking out above the water.

Two less popular dive sites are also commonly associated with the Edwardsburgh/Cardinal township, SS Ralph T. Holcomb, and Fleur Marie. Apparently just east of Cardinal, the hull of SS Ralph T. Holcomb lies in the old canal bank. This ship was purchased by the Canada Starch Company for hauling coal sometime in the early 1900s before it was sunk. Fleur Marie was built in Quebec in 1850 and was later left abandoned at the docks in Prescott. The abandoned ship was considered an eyesore amongst locals and eventually caught fire, leading to the ship to be scuttled in 50 ft (15 m) of water off the shore of Windmill Point in 1883, where it still currently sits. Although Fleur Marie is associated with the area, it is actually located within American waters.

== Galop Canal ==
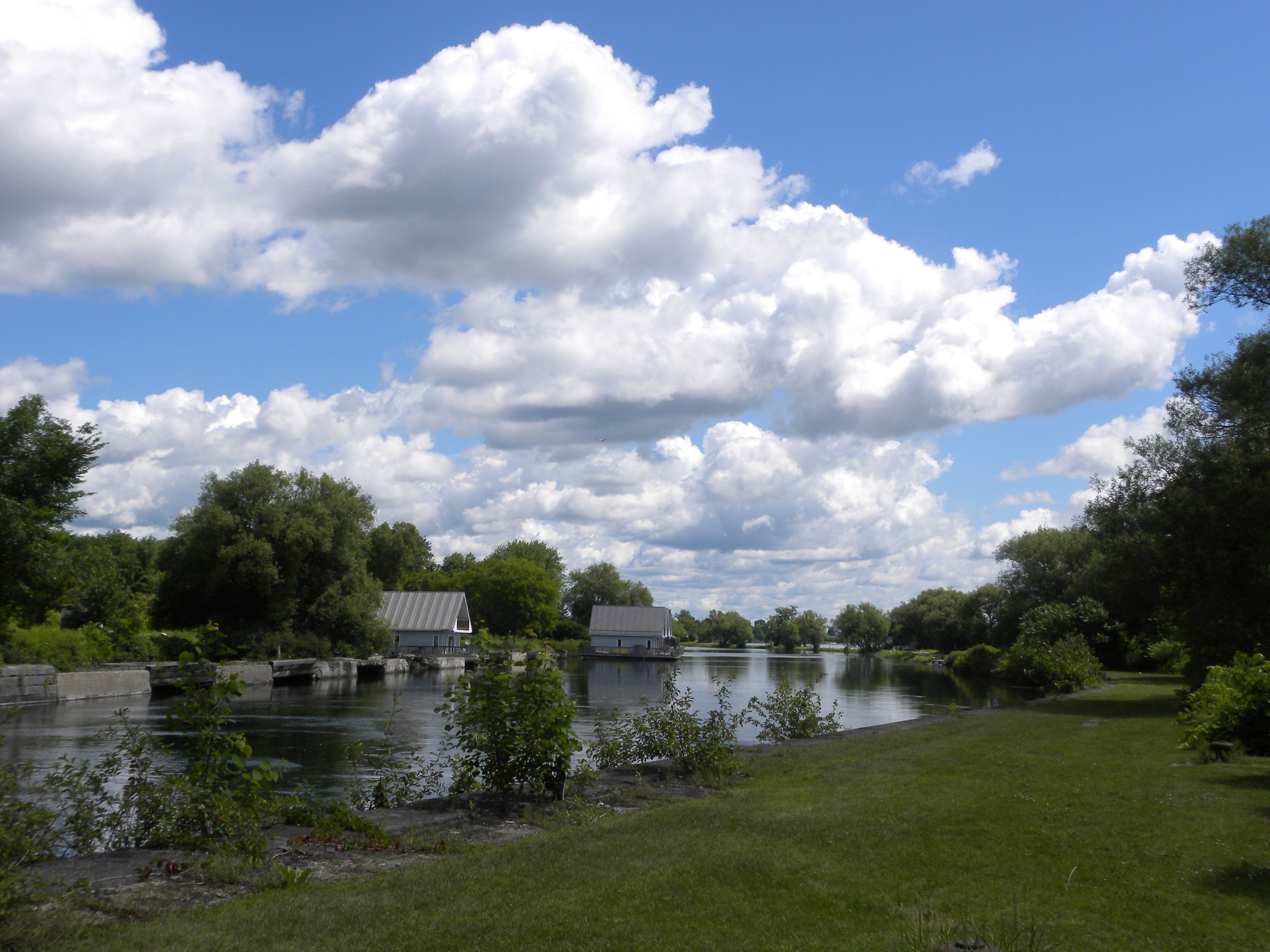
Galop Canal in 2015

The Galop Canal was opened in 1846 and was used until the 1950s. The canal allowed ships to bypass the rapids of the Saint Lawrence River near Cardinal and Iroquois. Construction began in 1844, and was done without machinery, but instead by use of hand tools such as axes, wheelbarrows, and shovels. The men worked for around 14 hours and were paid 50 cents each day. In 1897 new locks were built along the canal. Some parts of the canal reached 243 m (797 ft) in length and were the longest in Canada at the time.

In the 1950s, the St. Lawrence Seaway was created and new locks were built in Iroquois for large, ocean-going ships. Present day, Galop Canal is a popular location amongst locals for swimming and picnics, as well as diving. The wreck of Weehawk is located in Lock 27 at Galop Canal; divers are able to view this site and drift with the current of the Saint Lawrence River to the nearby Conestoga dive site.

== Education ==
The first public school in Cardinal, built around 1843, was a two-storey frame building originally standing at the corner of First and Henry Street. This school was later moved to the corner of New and James Street. Although it is unclear when the school closed, the building was used by the Canada Starch Company as a storehouse before becoming a duplex in 1891, as it remains in 2016. During the mid-1800s, there were two additional one-room log schoolhouses operating in Cardinal, one at the west end of the village and one about a mile east of the village. The exact years of their operation are unknown.

In 1872, the first schools were replaced by a two-room brick structure along Dundas Street, called Dundas Street Public School. As enrolment increased, a frame building was constructed 50 ft (15 m) west of the brick school to house the younger children. This school served as both an elementary and continuation school until 1911, when a separate continuation school was erected due to overcrowding.

The first continuation school opened in 1911, and was located on First Street. The building was a stable which was renovated into a school. This structure served as the continuation school until 1921, when a home once belonging to the prominent Benson family was sold and turned over to the school board. The school was known as Cardinal High School, and operated into the early 1950s. After its closure, the school was left boarded up and abandoned for a period of time before an accidental fire destroyed the building.

As the population increased and transportation improved, one and two-room schoolhouses were largely phased out in favour of larger, modern schools. In 1949, Cardinal became home to a modern public elementary school named Benson Public School in honour of a prominent village family. By 1959, four more classrooms were built. The school had its highest number of enrolment in the late 1960s with 400 pupils attending. Benson Public School closed in 2017.and sits abandoned to date
