= Waome =

History
- Name: Waome
- Launched: 1912
- Fate: Sank 6 October 1934

General characteristics
- Displacement: 60 tonnes
- Length: 78 ft (24 m)

Waome was a passenger steamer that sank on Lake Muskoka on 6 October 1934. Three people died when she sank.
