= Lillie Parsons =

Coordinates: 44°33′22.25″N 75°43′7.61″W

History

United States
- Name: Lillie Parsons
- Launched: 14 September 1868
- Fate: Sank, 5 August 1877

General characteristics
- Type: Great Lakes centreboard schooner
- Tons burthen: 276 tons
- Length: 131 ft (40 m)
- Beam: 26 ft (7.9 m)
- Depth of hold: 10 ft (3.0 m)
- Sail plan: Fore-and-aft rig
- Capacity: 500 long tons (508 t)
- Crew: 6

The Lillie Parsons was an American two-masted schooner which sank in the Saint Lawrence Seaway near Brockville, Ontario, Canada, in 1877.

The ship was launched on September 14, 1868, in Tonawanda, New York. On August 5, 1877, she hit a rock, took on water and sank after her cargo shifted during a squall.

The wreck was discovered on August 6, 1963, by three members of the local diving club, complete with 500 tons of coal on board. She rests at a depth of about 65 feet (20 m), off the shore of Sparrow Island.
