= Henry C. Daryaw =

History
- Name: Henry C. Daryaw
- Builder: Chantier de Normandie
- Completed: October 1920
- Fate: Wrecked 21 November 1941

General characteristics
- Displacement: 1146 tons
- Length: 219 ft (67 m)
- Beam: 35 ft (11 m)
- Draft: 13 ft (4.0 m)

Henry C. Daryaw a bulk cargo carrier that sank in the St. Lawrence River on November 21, 1941. She was in the shipping channel carrying a load of coal.
