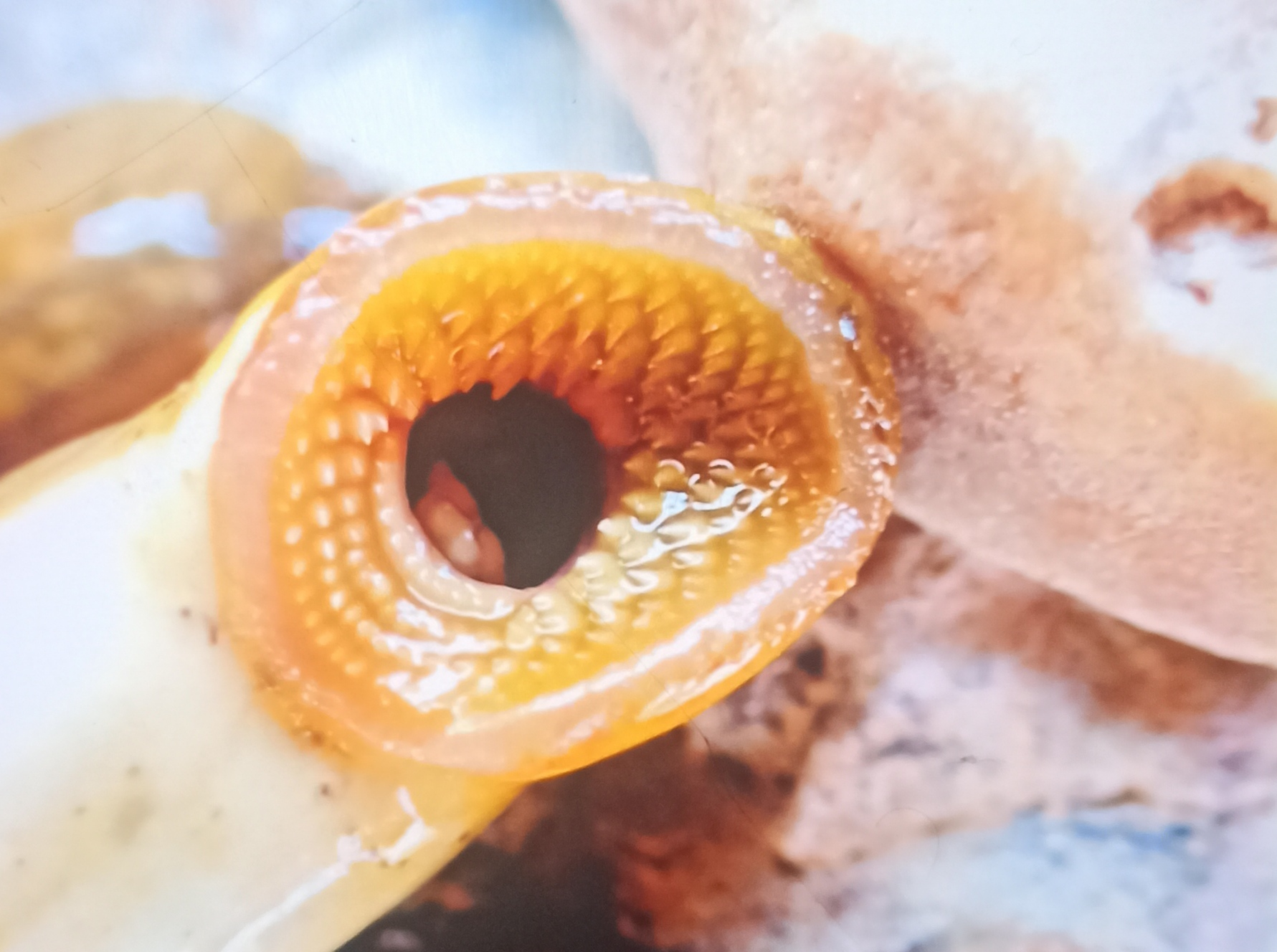
- Ohio lamprey.

Conservation status
- Least Concern (IUCN 3.1)

- Vulnerable (NatureServe)

Scientific classification
- Kingdom: Animalia
- Phylum: Chordata
- Infraphylum: Agnatha
- Superclass: Cyclostomi
- Class: Petromyzontida
- Order: Petromyzontiformes
- Family: Petromyzontidae
- Genus: Ichthyomyzon
- Species: I. bdellium

Binomial name
- Ichthyomyzon bdellium (D. S. Jordan, 1885)

Synonyms
- Petromyzon bdellius Jordan 1885; Petromyzon nigrus Rafinesque 1820; Ichthyomyzon nigrus (Rafinesque 1820); Petromyzon argenteus Kirtland 1838 non Bloch 1795 non Nardo 1847; Ichthyomyzon argenteus (Kirtland 1838)

= Ohio lamprey =

Species of jawless fish

The Ohio lamprey (Ichthyomyzon bdellium) is a lamprey found in the Ohio River drainage basin in the United States and is a parasitic species of lampreys. They are considered to be an endangered/rare species in some states, due to siltation, pollution, and construction of dams.

== Description ==
All lampreys have a long, almost eel-like, body with no scales. Lampreys have segments of muscles that are visible along their body called myomeres, and a jawless mouth. In larval lampreys, called ammocoetes, their mouth is not fully developed, very small, and hidden between folds of skin. Adults have a disk shaped mouth with varying amounts of teeth depending on the species. The Ohio lamprey has a single, continuous dorsal fin. Fully grown, Ohio lampreys reach 10–14 inches, but may get to 15 inches.

== Diet ==
As ammocoetes, Ohio lamprey filter plankton, algae, and other small organic matter. As adults, they attach onto larger prey, such as smallmouth bass, walleyes, redhorse suckers, and trout, feeding on blood and body fluids. Ohio lampreys do not appear to kill the host fish, as they evolved with other fishes in their range. As a result, they do not appear to have a significant effect on populations of their host fishes.

== Reproduction ==
As a sexually mature adult, Ohio lamprey will seek out suitable breeding sites. They likely do not return to their natal site to spawn, but this remains untested. Spawning occurs in late May or early June, with adults working together or in pairs to create a pit in riffles of moderate currents. They use their suction cup-like mouth to move rocks from these riffles, and then the female lamprey deposits eggs into this pit after mating. All adults will die after spawning.

== Distribution ==
The Ohio lamprey is found throughout the Ohio River basin in 11 states: Alabama, Georgia, Indiana, Kentucky, New York, North Carolina, Ohio, Pennsylvania, Tennessee, Virginia, and West Virginia. The Ohio lamprey used to be found in Illinois, but is now considered to be extirpated; the last sighting was in 1918.
