= Southern brook lamprey =

Conservation status
- Least Concern (IUCN 3.1)

- Secure (NatureServe)

Scientific classification
- Kingdom: Animalia
- Phylum: Chordata
- Infraphylum: Agnatha
- Class: Petromyzontida
- Order: Petromyzontiformes
- Family: Petromyzontidae
- Genus: Ichthyomyzon
- Species: I. gagei

Binomial name
- Ichthyomyzon gagei C. L. Hubbs & Trautman, 1937

Species of jawless fish

The southern brook lamprey (Ichthyomyzon gagei) is a lamprey found in the Southern United States including Arkansas, Louisiana, Mississippi, Alabama, and Georgia. It is a jawless fish with a sucking mouth on one end. Like most lamprey it is similar to in body plan to a small eel, and is rarely longer than 1 foot in length.

== Geographic distribution ==
The southern brook lamprey occurs in slow moving rivers and streams from Florida to southern Mississippi, Georgia, and Arkansas along the Gulf Coast west to Oklahoma and Texas. It ranges as far north as Minnesota and Wisconsin, and has been reported to occur in the Chattahoochee River system and the Conecuh River system in Alabama, the Sabine river system in Texas and Louisiana, the Illinois River system in Oklahoma, and the Neches River system in Texas. The southern brook lamprey was thought to be restricted to the southern United States; however, Becker observed southern brook lamprey in Wisconsin in 1983. The southern brook lamprey has also been reported to occur as far north as the Spruce River and the Tamarac River in Wisconsin and Minnesota. Unpublished findings have also shown that the southern brook lamprey inhabits tributaries of Choctawhatchee Bay and the Ochlockonee River system in Florida, the Chattahoochee river system in Georgia, and the Trinity and San Jacinto River systems in Texas.

== Ecology ==
The diet of the southern brook lamprey changes as it undergoes metamorphosis during its life cycle from one phase to the next. The diet of larval southern brook lamprey consists mainly of organic detritus. Studies that focused on closely related lamprey species (I. fossor) found that the guts of larval lampreys contained 97.9% organic detritus, 2.12% algae, and 0.09% bacteria. After metamorphosis into the adult phase, southern brook lampreys do not feed but rely on stored fat reserves accumulated during the larval stage for energy and nutrients. Studies have found that the digestive tract of the lamprey actually shrinks and becomes functionally useless as larval lampreys enter the adult stage. The southern brook lamprey encounters a wide range of predators in its natural habitat. The eggs of adults are preyed on by various species of fish and crayfish. Southern brook lampreys in the larval stage serve as prey for a wide range of fish and bird species. Adult forms are preyed upon by larger fish species such as the Northern pike (E. lucius), perch species, the European chub (S. cephalus), and the mudpuppy (N. maculosus). The southern brook lamprey shares similar habitats and resources with many species of shiners (Notropis), the longnose dace (Rhinichthys cataractae), Johnny darters (Etheostoma nigrum), and mottled sculpins (Cottus bairdi).

== Life history ==
The creature's life cycle consists of two main stages: larval and adult. During the larval stage, the southern brook lamprey inhabits a distinct micro habitat involving relatively slow moving water and a sandy substrate. The consistency of the substrate is vitally important to the Southern brook lamprey because during the larval stage, the lamprey burrows into the substrate using its oral disk as an anchor. The southern brook lamprey secretes mucus from its body to form a tube leading to the entrance of the burrow and to provide support for the burrow. The formation of this larval burrow relies on the composition and size of the substrate available. The combination of both small and large particles and coarse and fine sand grains allow the lamprey to construct a suitable burrow that allows enough water to flow through the burrow to ensure proper respiration. The substrate in which larvae burrow must not contain too many fine silt and clay particles as this would inhibit respiration while too many particles of coarse sand would hinder proper burrow construction. The larval stage is complete after approximately three years. Following the larval stage, the southern brook lamprey undergoes metamorphosis into the adult form. Adults are found in crevices and cracks between large rocks in deeper, faster moving water than the habitat occupied during the larval stage. After completing the metamorphosis to adults, southern brook lampreys come together in groups to spawn and, once spawning is complete, the adults die. Spawning usually occurs between April and May and takes place in another distinct microhabitat consisting of shallow riffle areas with rocky substrate with a water temperature falling between 17 °C to 21 °C. Fecundity of the southern brook lamprey averages between 800 and 2500 oocytes. Human factors have been found to influence the lamprey's habitat. Southern brook lampreys have been recorded using shallow areas under bridges as spawning grounds, possibly to help conceal spawning aggregations from visual predators.

== Current management ==
The southern brook lamprey is currently listed as a species of "least concern" in the United States by CN Red List. It has also not been given any status regarding endangerment by the US Federal List or CITES. Currently there are no conservation plans in action specific to the lamprey, nor laws or protected waterways aimed at conservation. No evidence of biological factors has been found that would contribute to a decline in the abundance or the range of the creature; in fact, the biggest threat to the lamprey and closely related species is human-induced alteration of suitable microhabitats. Habitat preservation and rehabilitation of affected microhabitats are essential. Microhabitats used by the southern brook lamprey during all life stages must have a certain water temperature, substrate composition, and water quality to ensure successful habitation and spawning in these areas.
