= Jacob Ellsworth Reighard =

American zoologist

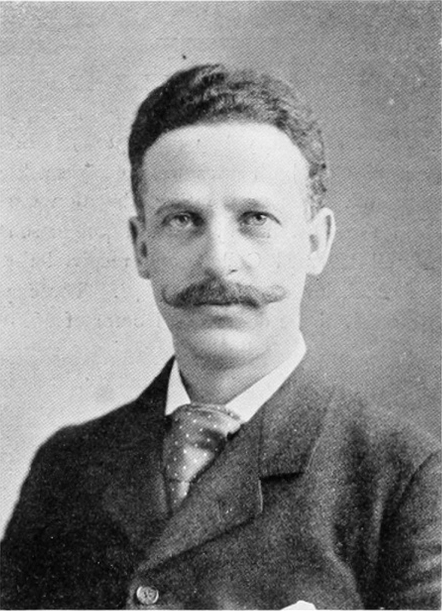
- Reighard in 1906
- Born: 1861; Laporte, Indiana, U.S.
- Died: 1942 (aged 80–81)

Jacob Ellsworth Reighard (1861–1942) was an American zoologist.

Reighard was born at Laporte, Indiana, after graduating from the University of Michigan in 1882, and then studied at Harvard and Freiburg. After six years as instructor and assistant in zoology, in 1892 he became a professor at the University of Michigan. He was in charge of the Michigan Fish Commission in 1890–94, and in 1898 was appointed director of the biological survey of the Great Lakes under the United States Fish Commission. He contributed to many technical journals, and in 1901 published, in collaboration with Herbert Spencer Jennings, Anatomy of the Cat.

== See also ==
- Category:Taxa named by Jacob Ellsworth Reighard
