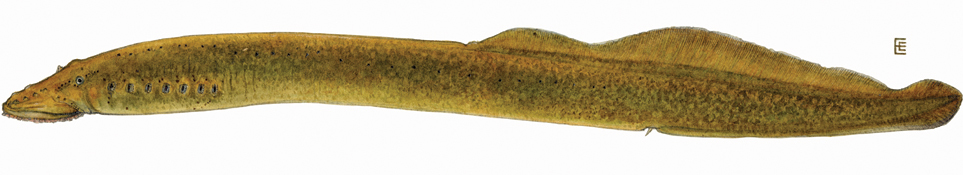

Conservation status
- Least Concern (IUCN 3.1)

- Secure (NatureServe)

Scientific classification
- Kingdom: Animalia
- Phylum: Chordata
- Infraphylum: Agnatha
- Class: Petromyzontida
- Order: Petromyzontiformes
- Family: Petromyzontidae
- Genus: Ichthyomyzon
- Species: I. unicuspis

Binomial name
- Ichthyomyzon unicuspis C. L. Hubbs & Trautman, 1937

Synonyms
- Ammocoetes concolor Kirtland 1840; Scolecosoma concolor (Kirtland 1840)

= Silver lamprey =

Species of jawless fish

The silver lamprey (Ichthyomyzon unicuspis) is a lamprey commonly found in the Northern and Central United States, as well as a large part of southern Canada. Its genus name means "sucking fish" in Greek and the species name means "one-pointed" in Latin. The silver lamprey is a member of the class Agnatha, sometimes referred to as cyclostomes (round-mouths). The silver lamprey should not be confused with the sea lamprey (Petromyzon marinus), which has caused considerable damage to native fish populations in the Great Lakes region.

== Distribution ==
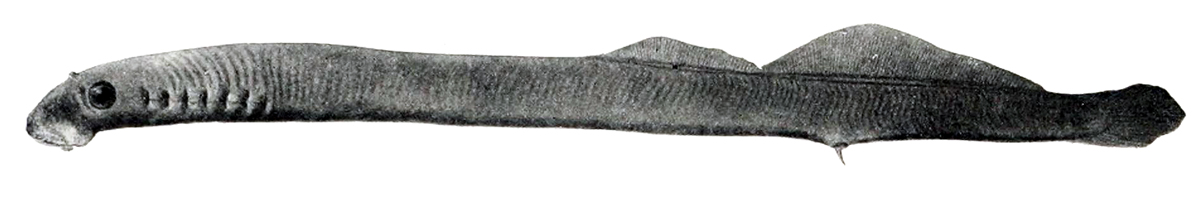
An illustration of a Silver lamprey from Fishes of Illinois by Forbes and Richarson.

The silver lamprey is commonly found along the Great Lakes and in the Mississippi River and Ohio River and their tributaries from Minnesota to Nebraska, Tennessee, and West Virginia. There have also been a small number of isolated encounters around the Hudson Bay and in the Mississippi River in Mississippi.

== Identification ==
The silver lamprey is an eel-like fish with an attenuate body composed of 49–52 clearly defined segments (i.e. myomeres, between the last gill slit and the anus). Silver lampreys possess a cartilaginous skeleton, and adults generally grow to a length of 12 inches and are silvery or bluish in color when spawning. Prior to spawning adults are often a dull brown or tan color. The dorsal fin is continuous, though it may be notched. The mouth is a jawless, sucking disc, with unicuspid teeth arranged in circular rows and is in the inferior position. When expanded, the mouth is wider than the lamprey's body. The lamprey's gills are arranged in a straight line immediately behind the eye, and a single nostril is located between the eyes. Larvae are a brown to tan all over have no eyes (instead they have eyespots) and are called ammocoetes. They also have seven gill openings and do not have any paired fins, they have only a long continuous fin runs from the dorsal to the ventral side. Ammocoetes also have no teeth and instead have an oral hood which houses skin extensions that help them filter particles out of the water as they draw it into their oral cavity.

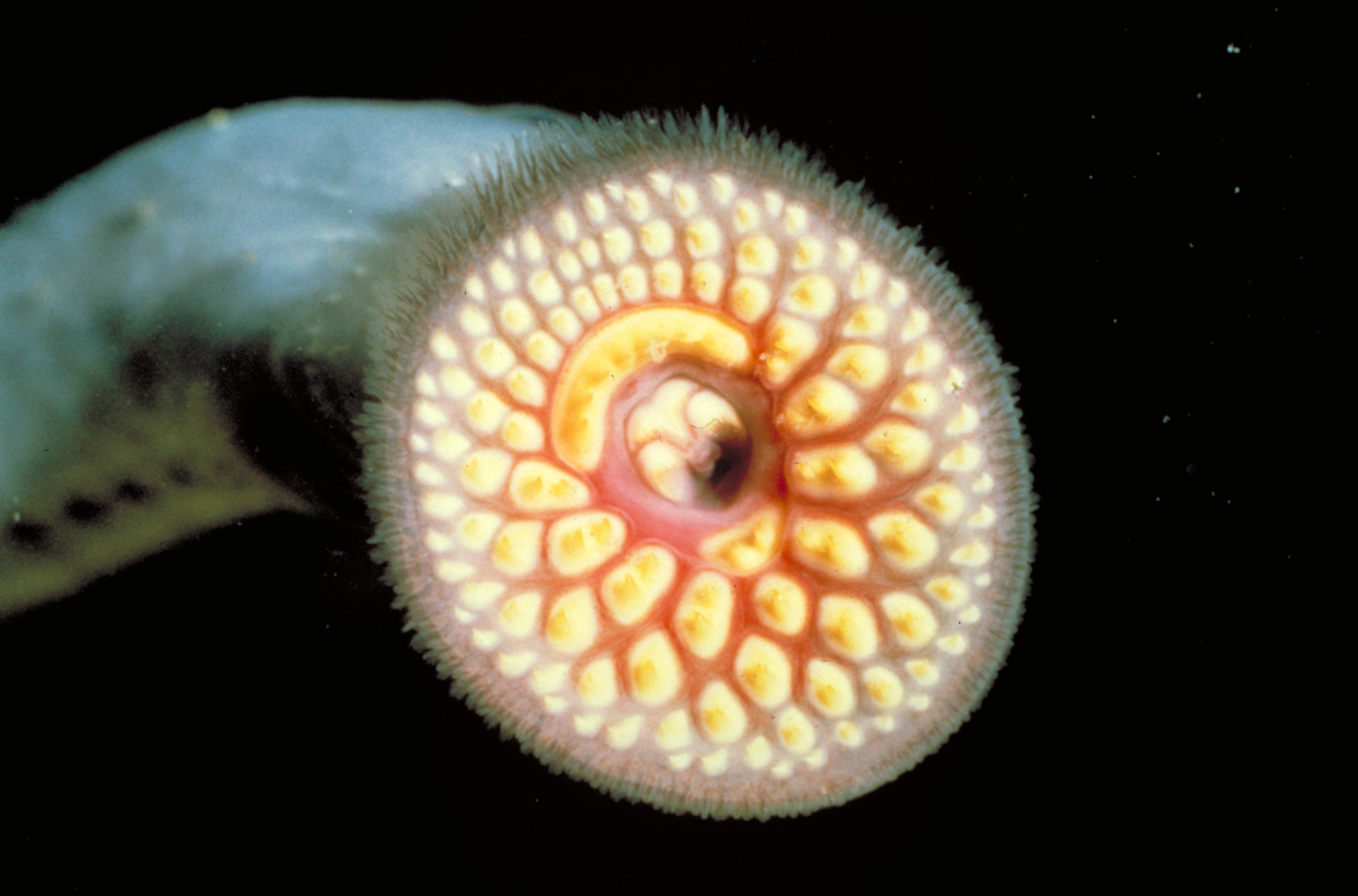
A detailed view of a Sea lamprey's oral disc. The oral disc of the Silver lamprey has a similar pattern of tooth-like structures.

== Habitat ==
Adult silver lampreys prefer the clear waters of large streams, rivers, and lakes. Adults migrate to nest in flowing water that has stoney or gravelly bottom material. When they hatch, the larvae move to slowly flowing areas initially with thick organic layers. As they grow in size, they begin to migrate to sandy environments where they will reside until they reach metamorphosis.

== Diet ==
Adult silver lampreys are parasitic, feeding on the blood of other fishes. Most non-parasitic lamprey feed only as larvae, then die. Silver lampreys use their oral discs to attach to their hosts, then cut through the skin and scales with their teeth. The lamprey will remain attached to the host over a long period of time, but they seldom kill their host (which have coevolved with these lampreys). Adults feed on a variety of fishes, including trout, whitefish, smelt, pike, white sucker, brown bullhead, rock bass, walleye, and the armored lake sturgeon. The silver lamprey's larval young feed on drifting plankton, algae, and detritus.

== Reproduction and life cycle ==
Adult silver lampreys move upstream to spawn in May and June, when the water temperature reaches 50 °F. Using their mouths to move sand and gravel, they dig a nest in the stream bed. Once the nest is completed, the female attaches herself to a rock and the male attaches to her head, wrapping his tail around hers to bring the genitals close together. Eggs and sperm are released, then the pair separates. Once spawning is completed and the eggs are deposited in the nest, the adults die. Upon hatching, the larvae (called ammocoetes) are blind, toothless, and provided with a fine-mesh tissue sieve. They drift downstream and burrow in the sand, mud, and organic material for 4–7 years. During this time, the ammocoetes feed mostly on detritus and algae. When they are approximately four to five inches long, the ammocoetes metamorphose into parasitic adults and migrate downstream to search for hosts. After one to two years feeding as a parasite, adult silver lampreys move upstream to spawn and die.
