= Kern brook lamprey =

Conservation status
- Vulnerable (IUCN 3.1)

Scientific classification
- Kingdom: Animalia
- Phylum: Chordata
- Infraphylum: Agnatha
- Class: Petromyzontida
- Order: Petromyzontiformes
- Family: Petromyzontidae
- Genus: Occidentis
- Species: O. hubbsi

Binomial name
- Occidentis hubbsi (Vladykov & Kott 1976)

Synonyms
- Entosphenus hubbsi Vladykov & Kott 1976; Lampetra hubbsi Docker 1999

Species of lamprey

The Kern brook lamprey (Occidentis hubbsi) is a nonparasitic, freshwater, demersal fish endemic to central California waterways.

== Description ==
O. hubbsi is similar to other lampreys in that it has a thin anguilliform body with a small caudal fin. Like other lampreys, it lacks any paired fins and an anal fin but has two dorsal fins. O. hubbsi exhibits countershading, as preserved specimens are dark grey-brown on the dorsal side and white on the ventral side. The dorsal fins have no coloration except for black speckles, but the rounded caudel in is partially black around the notochord; the color of the caudal fin is a key identifier of this species.

Lamprey species can be distinguished by a trunk myomere count, counted from the last gill pore to the anterior end of the cloaca. O. hubbsi adults have a trunk myomere count of 51-57, with an average count of 54.

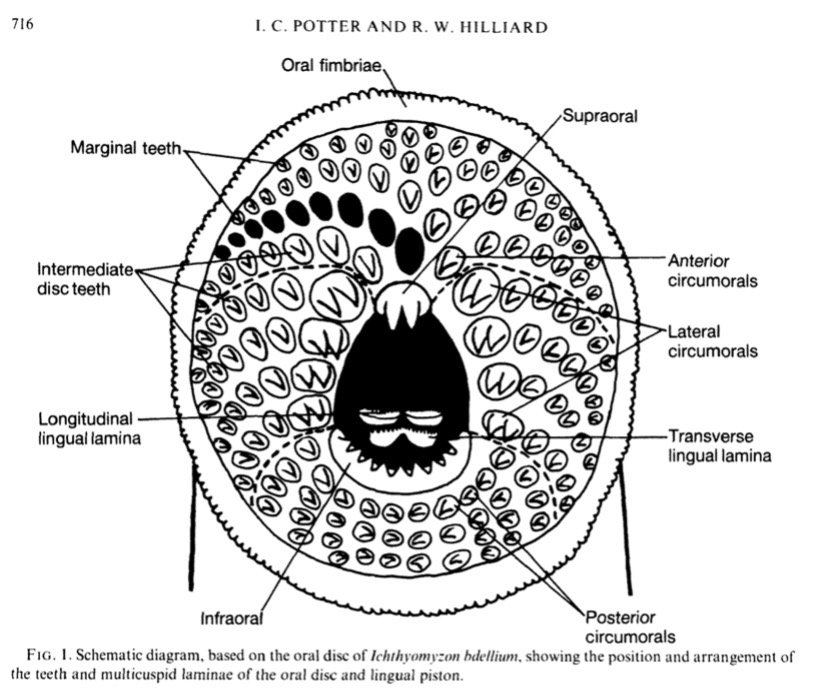
Diagram of lamprey dentition

Myomere count, size, and coloration can overlap with that of other spp., so dentition is often a more definitive method of identification. Morphological characteristics of O. hubbsi dentition include SO lamina 2 cusps; 4 inner laterals unicuspid; IO lamina 5 cusps; posterials about 10 (unicuspid); velar tentacles 3; reduced number of myomeres. As is characteristic of non-parasitic lamprey species, the teeth appear worn in contrast to parasitic species whose teeth are adapted for grasping onto hosts. No exolaterals are present, and the TL and lingual laminae are too underdeveloped to be properly accounted for.

O. hubbsi larva have a trunk myomere count of 53–57 and range in size from 11–15 cm, with the largest larva recorded being 16 cm. As larval lamprey enter their adult stage, they shrink to 8–14 cm which is relatively small for lamprey.

=== Sexual dimorphism ===
Most lampreys have common secondary sexual characteristics, namely an elongated urogenital papilla which is more visible in males than in females. In O. hubbsi, the range of the urogenital papilla length in males was 1mm–2mm, with an average of 1.6mm. The length of the female's is not recorded but noted to be much shorter. Other diagnostic body proportions include disc length, which is longer in males, and trunk length as a percentage of total length of the individual (trunk length is measured from the last gill pore to the anterior end of the cloaca) and is longer in females. Close to spawning, females develop a noticeable anal finlike fold, while males completely lack this feature. Additionally, sexually mature females have an upward pointing tail which is potentially exaggerated in non-parasitic species as compared to parasitic species.

== Systematics ==
=== Pairing ===
Parasitic and non-parasitic lamprey are often placed in "pairs" due to the ammocoetes stage of each species being almost indistinguishable in morphology and life history. It is assumed that the non-parasitic species diverged from the parasitic counterparts, though the phylogenetic relationships among Lampetra has only recently begun to be solidified in part due to molecular evidence providing new insights. O. hubbsi is considered a "relic" species, due to there being no identifiable parasitic ancestor species. Either O. hubbsi has evolved to be highly distinct from its parasitic ancestor, or that ancestor is now extinct. Relic species are thought to be in the final stages of speciation, from a parasitic species to a paired species, to a paired species that eventually becomes distinct from its parasitic counterpart.

=== Genus disputes ===
==== Entosphenus and Lampetra ====
Originally, O. hubbsi was assumed to be derived from E. tridentata during the first description of the species. The describers also placed O. hubbsi in Entosphenus due to its single row of posterior teeth, which is characteristic of the genus. However, molecular evidence placed O. hubbsi as a descendant of O. ayresii, and placed O. richardsonii, O. ayresii, and O. hubbsi together in a clade. This novel molecular evidence characterized the former Entosphenus resident as belonging to the genus Lampetra. Further evidence supporting the reclassification of O. hubbsi includes the structure of the papillae, finger-like structures within the gill pores. Those seen on O. hubbsi specimens more closely aligned with the genus Lampetra than with Entosphenus, thus further supporting reclassification.

==== Lampetra and Occidentis ====
Lampetra was a genus that combined brook and river lampreys from all regions of North America, as well as Eurasia. Occidentis is a recently established genus that distinguishes Western river and brook lampreys from those in other regions. The distinction is based on the morphological and behavioral differences that result from the habitat differences between Pacific waterways and those of Eastern North America and Eurasia. Occidentis spp. are defined as having 2 dorsal fins, 2 (or rarely 3 in O. hubbsi) unicuspid teeth, no exolateral teeth, and a range confined to Western North America. Due to its distributionbeing limited to California and matching the morphological description, O. hubbsi was reclassified from Lampetra to Occidentis.

== Distribution and abundance ==
O. hubbsi is found in freshwater waterways in the San-Joquin drainage system at a mean elevation of 135m. The initial description of the species consisted of individuals found in the Friant-Kern canal. However, the descriptors noted that the canal was lined with concrete and had fast-flowing currents and was not suitable for lamprey and suggested that the specimens originated in the Kern River system. A second description used individuals collected from the Merced River and theorized that it was present in the San Joaquin River and Sacramento River. From 1985–1987, O. hubbsi was recorded in the Merced, San Joaquin, Kings, and Kaweah rivers. Studies from 1999 and 2012 collected individuals from Merced River. While these studies confirmed presence of O. hubbsi in specific areas, no abundance data was collected, and no recent abundance data is available. A memo from the California Fish and Wildlife Department gives a rough estimate of each population containing more than 1,000 individuals.

== Life history ==
Little work has been done to document the life history of O. hubbsi, but is presumed to be similar to that of O. richardsoni, a non-predatory lamprey that is within the same clade as O. ayresii and O. hubbsi. Where there are gaps in knowledge, information about O. richardsonii or general brook lamprey will be provided.

=== Larval stage ===
Recently hatched lamprey pro-larva will feed from the egg sac until they reach the larval stage, where they burrow in the ground and filter feed until metamorphosis begins. Lamprey larva have also been referred to as ammocoetes in older literature, though the use of this term has been phased out in favor of the better-defined term "larva" or "larval lamprey". O. hubbsi larva prefer cooler (more than 24 °C), slow flowing waters, usually found in shallow pools or the edges of runs with cover. They will burrow into substrate composed of sand and mud at 30–110 cm deep. Generally, larval lamprey use mucus to trap particles of algae, organic detritus, and bacteria, with the largest percentage being detritus. The length of the larval stage for O. hubbsi is not known, but is estimated to be 4–5 years based on other non-parasitic species.

=== Metamorphosis ===
Generally, individuals enter the transformed stage when the water temperature and fat reserves are sufficient. Based on the collection date of adult O. hubbsi individuals, metamorphosis takes place in the fall and lasts approximately four months. During metamorphosis, the eyes, oral disc, fins and adult coloration develop.

=== Adult stage ===
Non-parasitic lamprey species reach sexual maturity almost immediately after metamorphizing and begin migration upstream. In contrast to parasitic species which migrate by attaching themselves to a host, non-parasitic species do not feed at all. As a result, they experience significant shrinkage as their food stores go towards ensuring the success of their single reproductive event. The dorsal fins of sexually mature individuals will no longer be separated.

=== Reproduction ===
Parasitic species of lamprey migrate long distances, often being moved with their host, and do not return to their natal stream to reproduce. Non-parasitic lamprey may migrate but will stay within their home watershed. O. hubbsi is assumed to begin the spawning process in spring based on the time adult specimens were collected.

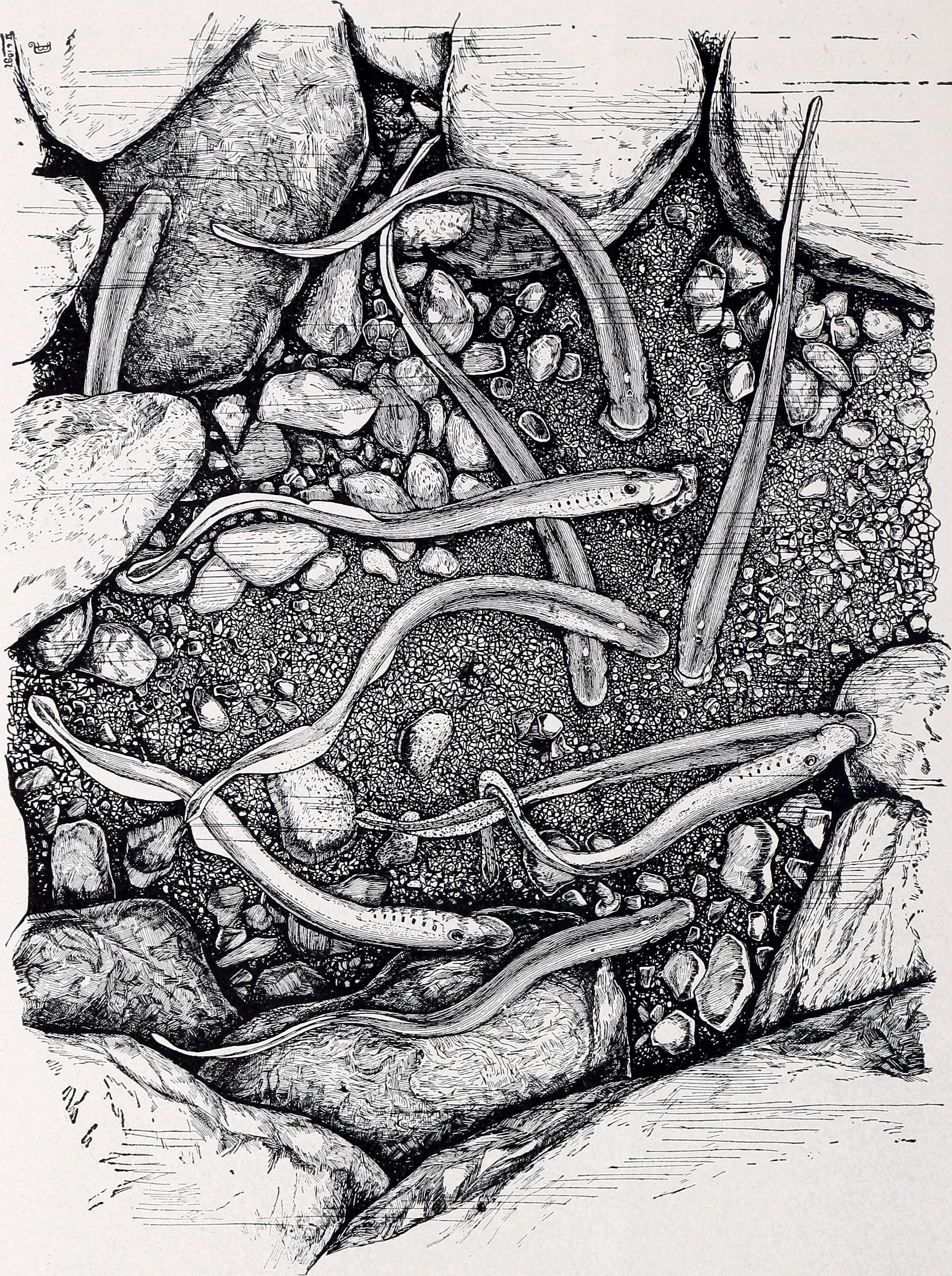
Brook lamprey nesting

All Lamprey spp. share the behavioral trait of using their oral discs to move rocks to form a nest. However, the size, number of adults per nest, and ideal water temperature all vary among species. O. richardsoni nests are constructed in gravel riffles where the water is within 10-18 °C. Both females and males use the natural downstream current to move rocks they have attached onto with their oral discs. Nest size is proportional to adult size. O. richardsoni adults, that range from 8–15 cm, make nests 15–20 cm wide, and 15 cm deep, with 2-4 adults in each nest. Due to its similar size, O. hubbsi may have similar nest structure; however, ideal spawning temperature and nest occupant number may vary between the two species. Spawning O. hubbsi females were collected in February, so it is assumed that the spawning period is February to March.

Smaller species (more than 30 cm) often communally spawn, with polygynandry being the most common mating system. It is speculated that smaller lamprey are polygynandrous to make up for their smaller size when building nests. Larger lamprey can move heavier rocks on their own, but smaller lamprey require several individuals to achieve the same results.

O. hubbsi produces eggs that are slightly ellipsoidal and average 1.02mm in length. Absolute fecundity ranged from 1,433–2,762 eggs with a mean of 1,865, but a typical range for non-parasitic lamprey is 1,000–3,000. The absolute fecundity of the lampreys was determined by direct counting. Egg spawning occurs over several days. Since O. richardsoni eggs take around 10 days to hatch, the hatching timeline for O. hubbsi might be similar. A majority of lamprey die after spawning, with O. richardsoni females dying approximately 1 week after spawning, and males dying after 1–2 months.

== Conservation ==
=== Threats ===
==== Habitat loss ====
O. hubbsi populations exist in rivers which are in proximity to dams and construction, which are not currently being managed in a way that is conducive to lamprey populations. Larval lamprey especially require rigid conditions for survival including fine silt for larval lamprey to bury in. Since this lamprey are in this life stage for a considerable portion of time, destruction of this habitat due to dredging, construction, or mining has considerable impacts. Change in water flow caused by dams can either flood rivers or dry out river beds, both which lowers O. hubbsi survival as certain water flow speeds and depths are needed for all life stages.

==== Sink habitats ====
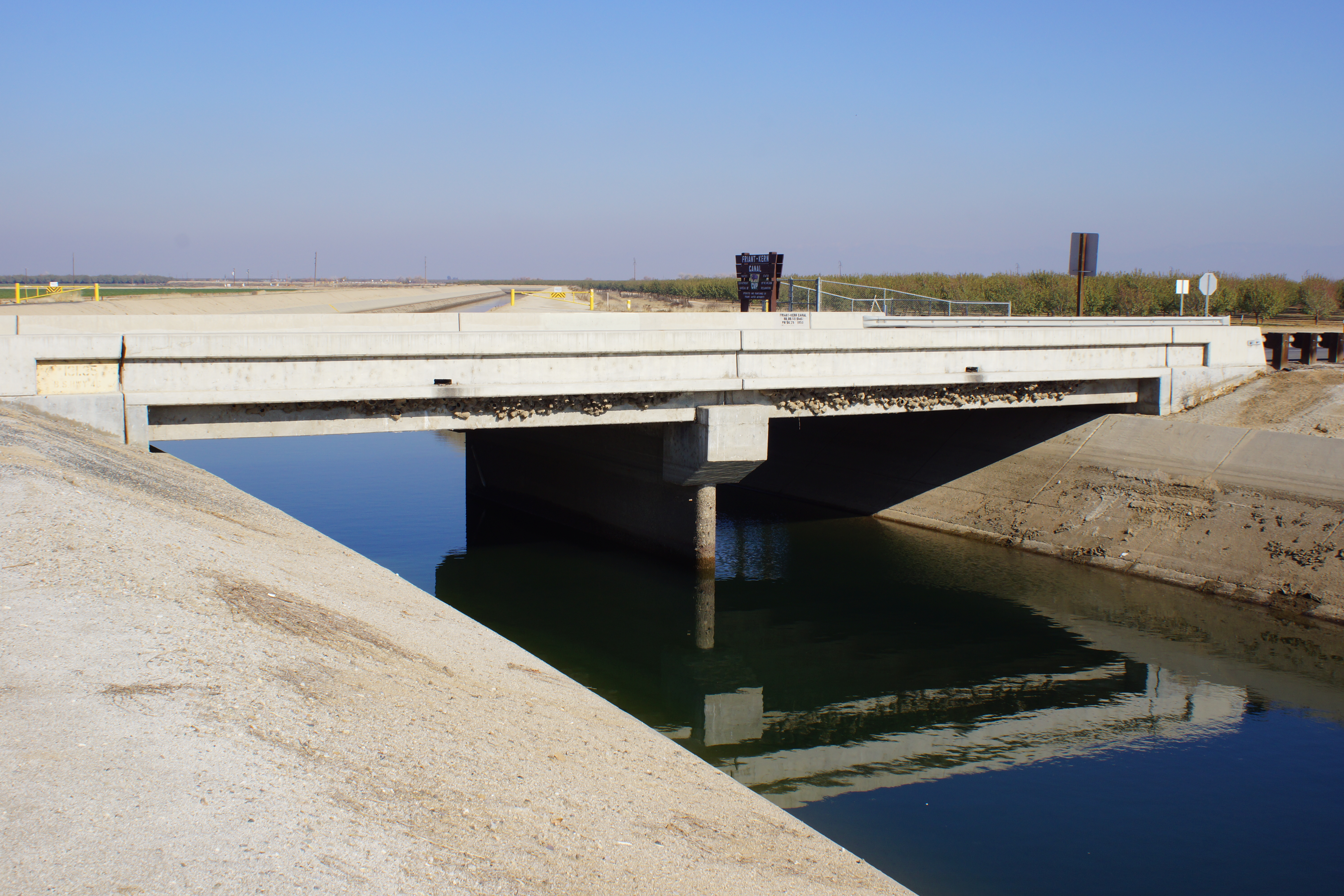
Friant-Kern Canal, the waterway where the first population of O. hubbsi were found and described.

The original O. hubbsi individuals described were found in the Friant-Kern canal, a concrete lined high speed waterway not suitable for spawning or larval growth. It is highly likely that the population found in this waterway does not contribute to species abundance and is a sink population. Further damming projects, if not properly managed for lamprey conservation, could isolate already fragmented populations of O. hubbsi in unsuitable environments.

=== Conservation efforts ===
From the initial description of the species in 1976, conservation of O. hubbsi has been highly recommended due to its limited range and fragmented population. A petition to list O. hubbsi as threatened was presented in 2003 but was rejected in 2004 due to insufficient information. The California Fish and Wildlife Department has listed O. hubbsi has a Species of Special Concern, meaning that they are vulnerable to extinction. An evaluation by researchers including Peter Moyle has given them status of special concern, meaning "The species is in decline or has a very limited distribution, so special management is needed to keep it from becoming threatened or endangered". Despite the status given, little work is being done to monitor or conserve these populations, likely due to their perceived lack of economic, cultural, or social value.
