= Miller Lake =

Miller Lake may refer to:

In Canada

- Miller Lake (Nova Scotia), a lake in Fall River, Nova Scotia
- Miller Lake, a lake in Guysborough County, Nova Scotia
- Miller Lake, a lake in Hants County, Nova Scotia
- Miller Lake Mooseland, a lake in Halifax Regional Municipality, Nova Scotia
- Miller Lake (Miller Creek, Kenora District), a tributary of Miller Creek, in Kenora District, Ontario
- Miller Lake (Frontenac County), a lake in Frontenac County, Ontario
- Miller Lake (Renfrew County), a lake in Renfrew County, Ontario
- Miller Lake (Bruce County), a lake in Bruce County, Ontario
- Miller Lake (Nipissing District), a lake in Nipissing District, Ontario
- Miller Lake (Parry Sound District), a lake in Parry Sound District, Ontario
- Miller Lake (Maund Township, Cochrane District), a lake in Maund Township, Cochrane District, Ontario
- Miller Lake (Algoma District), a lake in Algoma District, Ontario
- Miller Lake (Bayly Township, Timiskaming District), a lake in Bayly Township, Timiskaming District, Ontario
- Miller Lake (Thunder Bay District), a lake in Thunder Bay District, Ontario
- Miller Lake (Irwin Creek, Kenora District), a tributary of Irwin Creek, in Kenora District, Ontario
- Miller Lake (Nicol Township, Timiskaming District), a lake in Nicol Township, Timiskaming District, Ontario
- Miller Lake (Timmins), a lake in Timmins, Ontario
- Miller Lake, a lake of the Gouin Reservoir, in La Tuque, in Mauricie, in Quebec.

In the United States

- Miller Lake, a lake in Arkansas County, Arkansas
- Miller Lake, a lake in Columbia County, Arkansas
- Miller Lake, a lake in Prairie County, Arkansas
- Miller Lake (Carver County, Minnesota)
- Miller Lake, a lake in Yellow Medicine County, Minnesota
- Miller Lake in Deer Lodge County, Montana
- Miller Lake (Flathead County, Montana) in Flathead County, Montana
- Miller Lake (Powell County, Montana) in Powell County, Montana
- Miller Lake in Musselshell County, Montana
- Miller Lake (Oregon), a lake in Klamath County, Oregon
