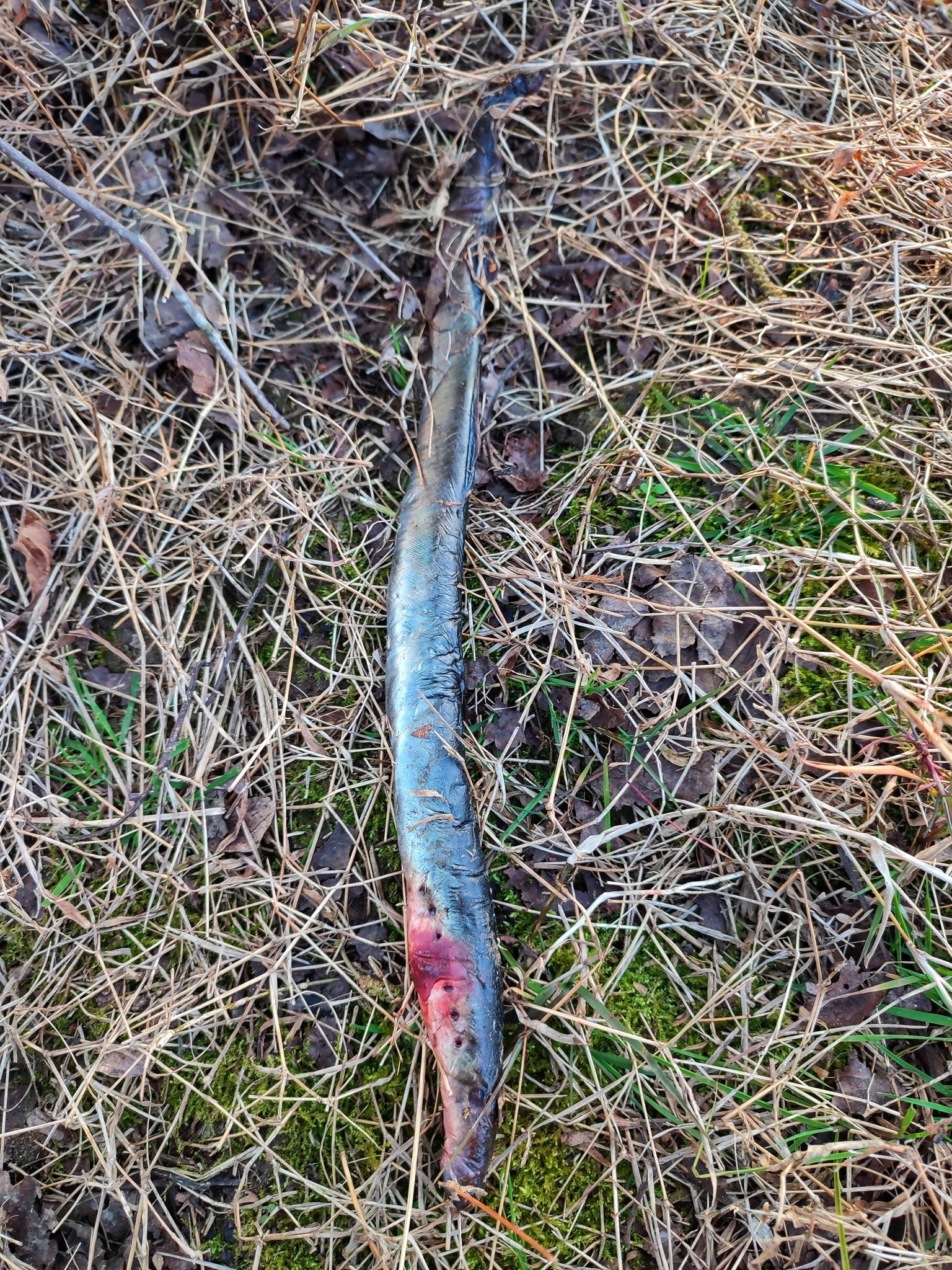

Conservation status
- Least Concern (IUCN 3.1)

Scientific classification
- Kingdom: Animalia
- Phylum: Chordata
- Infraphylum: Agnatha
- Class: Petromyzontida
- Order: Petromyzontiformes
- Family: Petromyzontidae
- Genus: Caspiomyzon
- Species: C. wagneri

Binomial name
- Caspiomyzon wagneri (Kessler, 1870)

Synonyms
- Petromyzon wagneri Kessler 1870; Agnathomyzon wagneri (Kessler 1870); Agnathomyzon (Haploglossa) caspicus Gratzianov 1907; Haploglossa caspica (Gratzianov 1907)

= Caspian lamprey =

Species of lamprey

The Caspian lamprey, Caspiomyzon wagneri, is a species of lamprey native to the Caspian Sea, and a member of the Petromyzontidae family. This species is a non-parasitic lamprey that feeds on animal carcasses.

== Taxonomy ==
Formerly thought to be the only member of the genus Caspiomyzon, phylogenetic evidence suggests that Eudontomyzon hellenicus and E. graecus (if separate from E. hellenicus) also belong in this genus, and have thus been reclassified as such.

== Description ==
The Caspian lamprey is a slim-bodied, eel-like fish that grows to a length of about 40 cm (16 in). The longest recorded specimen was 55 cm (22 in) long and weighed 206 g (7.3 oz). Like other lampreys, it has no jaws, but it has a round oral disc surrounding the mouth. Inside this it has several radiating rows of tiny, backward-facing teeth. There is a single nostril near the eyes. There are no gill covers and the seven gill openings are visible just behind the head. The fish has no scales or paired fins, but has two elongated dorsal fins, the hindmost of which nearly joins onto the small tail fin. The Caspian lamprey is a silvery-grey colour.

== Distribution ==
The Caspian lamprey is an anadromous fish which spends its adult life in the Caspian Sea and migrates up the Volga, Sura, and other rivers to spawn. It was at one time a common fish caught in nets and fish traps in the lower Volga for extracting fish oil and making candles and later for human consumption. In the early 1900s, 15 to 30 million fish were harvested annually from the lower Volga. It is now an uncommon fish because its migratory routes have been disrupted by dams and construction projects and it can no longer reach its spawning grounds.

== Status ==
The Caspian lamprey was formerly listed as "Near Threatened" in the IUCN Red List of Threatened Species. Damming of rivers in the mid-20th century had caused it to be cut off from its traditional spawning sites, but new sites have been found below the dams. The chief threat more recently has been the drying up of these streams caused by drought. However, populations have stabilised after this decline, and are even increasing in part of its range.
