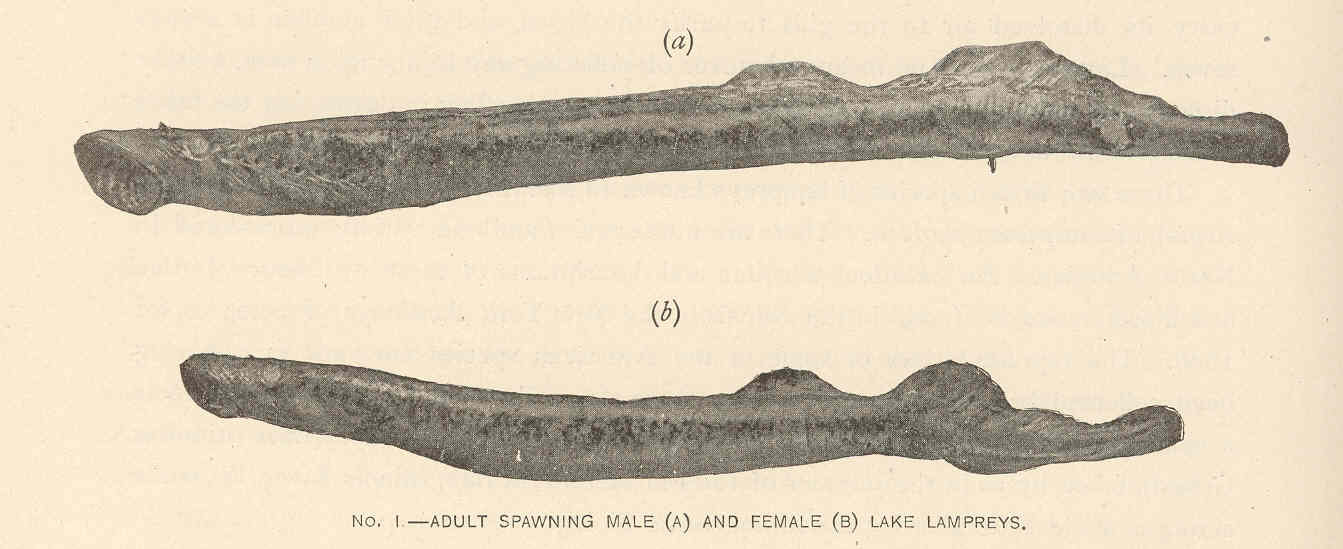
- (A) Spawning male and (B) Spawning female

Conservation status
- Endangered (IUCN 3.1)

Scientific classification
- Kingdom: Animalia
- Phylum: Chordata
- Infraphylum: Agnatha
- Class: Petromyzontida
- Order: Petromyzontiformes
- Family: Petromyzontidae
- Genus: Entosphenus
- Species: E. macrostoma

Binomial name
- Entosphenus macrostoma (Beamish, 1982)

Synonyms
- Lampetra macrostoma Beamish 1982; Entosphenus macrostomus

= Lake lamprey =

Species of jawless fish

The lake lamprey, Entosphenus macrostoma, also known as the Vancouver lamprey or Cowichan lamprey, a recent derivative of the Pacific lamprey, is a species of freshwater lamprey endemic to two North American lakes: Lake Cowichan and Mesachie Lake in Vancouver Island, Canada. The lamprey was originally called the Vancouver Island lamprey, until an error in filing shortened it to the Vancouver lamprey. The alternate common name of "Cowichan lamprey" was coined and promoted by the species' describer, Dr. Dick Beamish, who originally identified the species in the 1980s.

== Description ==
An adult lake lamprey is dark blue or dark brown with a lighter belly, and the body is 11.8-27.3 cm in length. The lamprey's disc-like mouth is filled with sharp teeth. The Vancouver lamprey has eyes on the top of its head, two dorsal fins, a caudal fin, and an anal fin.

== Distribution and habitat ==
The lake lamprey is found only in the Cowichan and Mesachie Lakes on Vancouver Island, and is not migratory. The lamprey lives and spawns in shallow gravel areas and typically remains in the lake rather than venturing up streams. The ammocoetes larvae are found in silt depositions along the shores of both lakes. They have been found to be capable of surviving in saltwater through experimentation, but remain in fresh water in the wild. An estimated 1,000 to 2,000 live in the entirety of the two lakes as adults.

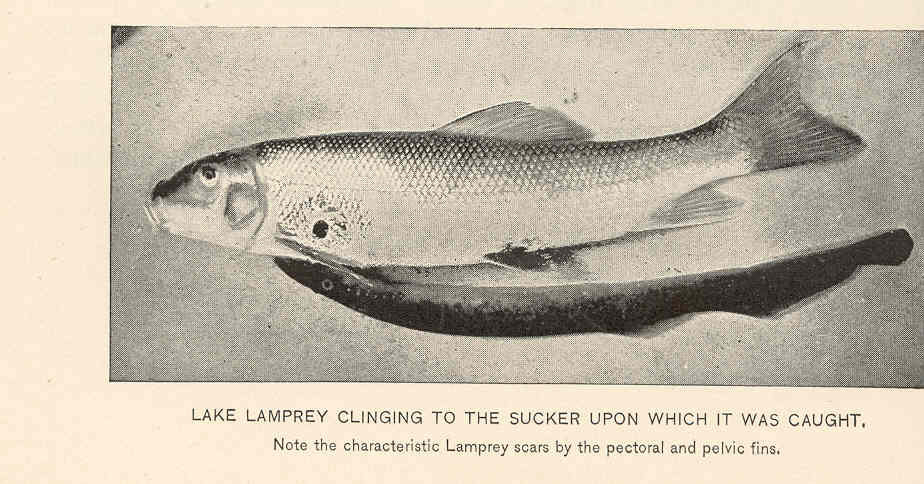
Sketch of lake lamprey clinging to prey

== Diet ==
The adults of several lamprey species, including those of the lake lamprey, are hematophagous predators that latch onto other fish species to feed on their bodily fluids. Young salmonids such as cutthroat trout and the coho salmon are common prey. Wounds have been known to penetrate into the body cavity of hosts, though the majority of prey are only scarred and are not fatally wounded. Only 15% of prey are mortally injured from lamprey feedings. Lampreys are one of the leading predators of salmonids, as shown by the high frequency of salmonids with scars (50–80%) found in the lakes.

== Reproduction ==
Lampreys breed once in their lives around 8 years of age. Spawning is from May to August in shallow gravel bars or the mouths of creeks in their respective lake. Over 10,000 eggs are produced in 2 to 3 weeks. The ammocoetes larvae can be found in silt, mud, or sand with relatively still water, and feed on fine organic materials. These larvae undergo a metamorphosis after 5 to 6 years to become adult lampreys. The adult lifespan is only 2 more years before they return to gravel lake shores to spawn.
