= Eudontomyzon vladykovi =

Conservation status
- Least Concern (IUCN 3.1)

Scientific classification
- Kingdom: Animalia
- Phylum: Chordata
- Infraphylum: Agnatha
- Superclass: Cyclostomi
- Class: Petromyzontida
- Order: Petromyzontiformes
- Family: Petromyzontidae
- Genus: Eudontomyzon
- Species: E. vladykovi

Binomial name
- Eudontomyzon vladykovi Oliva & Zanandrea, 1959

Synonyms
- Eudontomyzon danfordi vladykovi Oliva & Zanandrea 1959; Eudontomyzon mariae vladykovi (Oliva & Zanandrea 1959)

Species of jawless fish

Eudontomyzon vladykovi, or Vladykov's lamprey, is a species of lamprey in the family Petromyzontidae. It is found in Austria, Germany, The Czech Republic, Bulgaria, Romania, Serbia, and Montenegro.
