= Caspiomyzon =

Scientific classification
- Kingdom: Animalia
- Phylum: Chordata
- Infraphylum: Agnatha
- Class: Petromyzontida
- Order: Petromyzontiformes
- Family: Petromyzontidae
- Genus: Caspiomyzon; L. S. Berg, 1906

Species
- Caspiomyzon graecus; Caspiomyzon hellenicus; Caspiomyzon wagneri

Genus of lampreys

Caspiomyzon is a genus of lamprey in the family Petromyzontidae. They are native to Eastern Europe and parts of Western and Central Asia. Two of the three species in the genus are endemic to Greece.

== Taxonomy ==
=== Species ===
There are currently three recognized species in this genus:

- Caspiomyzon graecus (Renaud & Economidis, 2010) (validity doubtful, may be junior synonym of C. hellenicus)
- Caspiomyzon hellenicus (Vladykov, Renaud, Kott & Economidis), 1982 (Greek brook lamprey)
- Caspiomyzon wagneri (Kessler, 1870) (Caspian lamprey)

This was formerly considered a monotypic genus containing only C. wagneri, but phylogenetic studies suggest that hellenicus and graecus, formerly placed in Eudontomyzon, also belong to this genus.

=== Evolution ===
Phylogenetic studies indicate that they are the most basal members of the family Petromyzontidae, and their lineage diverged from the other genera in the family (Petromyzon and Ichthyomyzon) in the Late Cretaceous. The wagneri lineage diverged from the graecus+hellenicus lineage during the Eocene, although both Greek species only diverged during the late Pliocene.

== Ecology ==
Unlike other lampreys, species of Caspiomyzon are suspected to feed on carrion rather than live prey.
