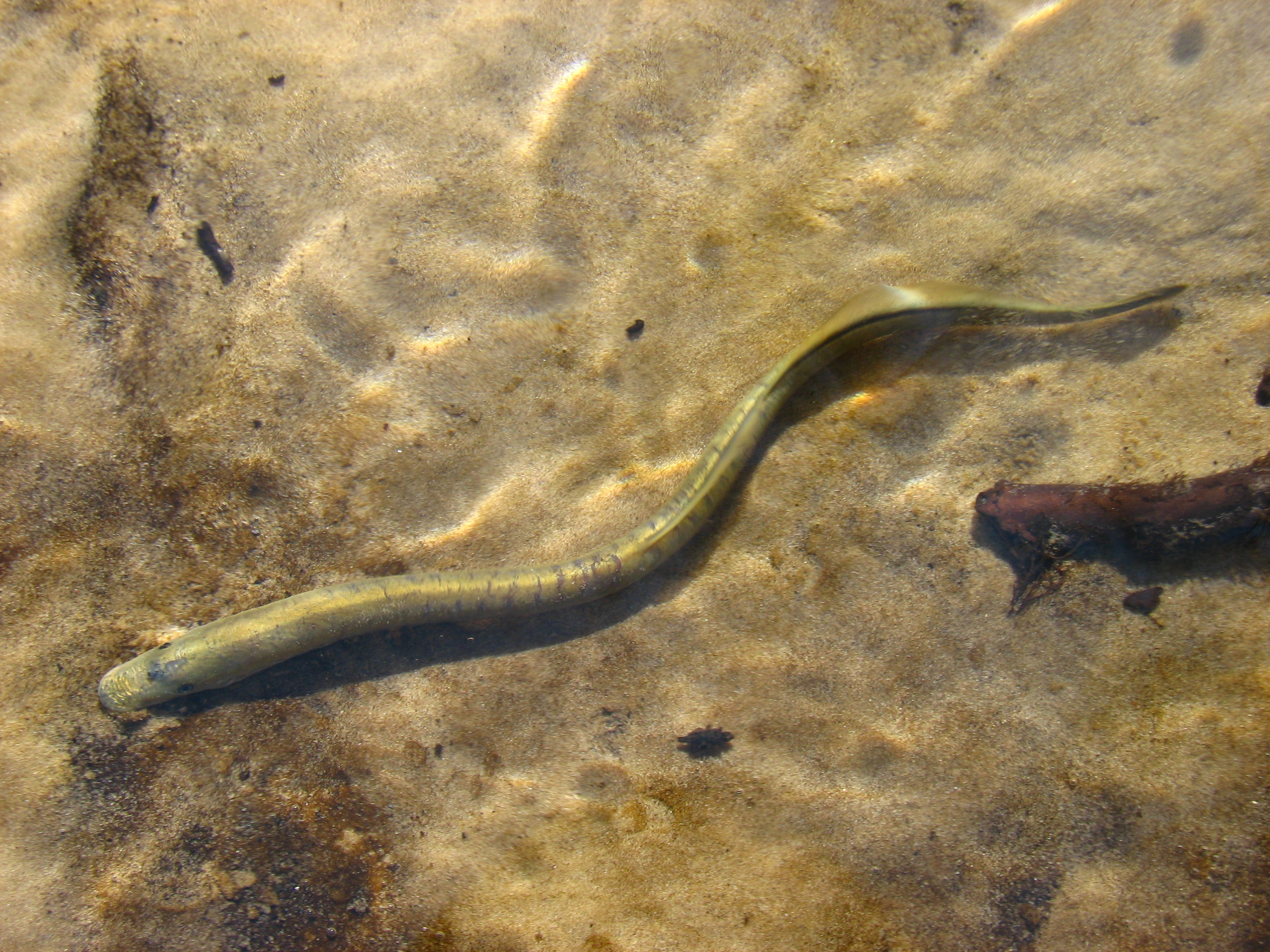

Conservation status
- Least Concern (IUCN 3.1)

Scientific classification
- Kingdom: Animalia
- Phylum: Chordata
- Infraphylum: Agnatha
- Superclass: Cyclostomi
- Class: Petromyzontida
- Order: Petromyzontiformes
- Family: Petromyzontidae
- Genus: Eudontomyzon
- Species: E. mariae

Binomial name
- Eudontomyzon mariae (Berg, 1931)

Synonyms
- Lampetra mariae Berg 3402; Petromyzon ponticus Yashchenko 1896

= Ukrainian brook lamprey =

Species of jawless fish

The Ukrainian brook lamprey (Eudontomyzon mariae) is a species of lamprey in the Petromyzontidae family. It is found in brackish and freshwater areas in Austria, Belarus, Bulgaria, the Czech Republic, Georgia, Hungary, Moldova, North Macedonia, Poland, Romania, Russia, Serbia, Montenegro, Slovakia, Turkey, and Ukraine. It invaded the basin of the Volga River in 2001.

== Biology ==
The Ukrainian brook lamprey reaches a maximum length of 22 cm (8.7 in). It inhabits the mountain and foothill bodies of water containing clear water with strong currents. It is a non-parasitic lamprey. They are preyed on by chub and other species during spawning, which takes place on gravel and sand substrates.
