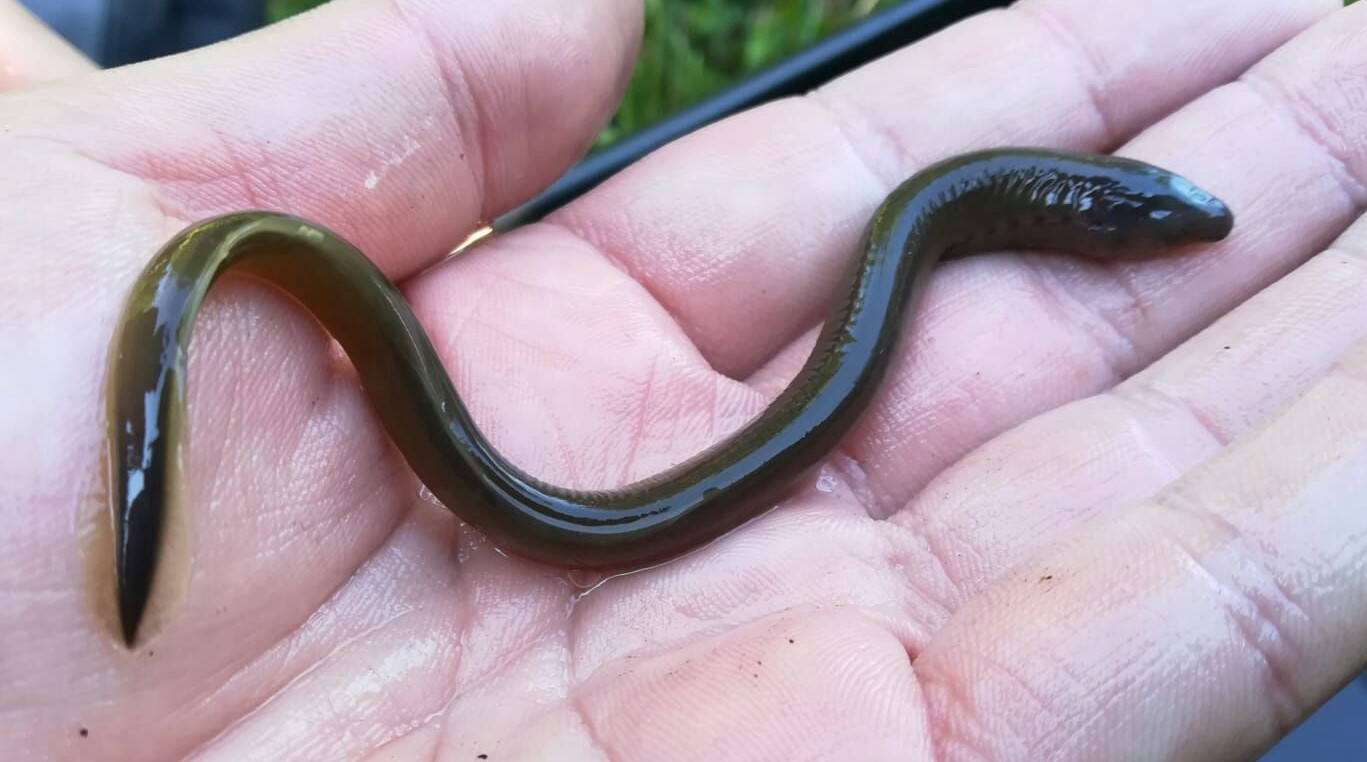
- Ammocoete of Eudontomyzon stankokaramani

Conservation status
- Near Threatened (IUCN 3.1)

Scientific classification
- Kingdom: Animalia
- Phylum: Chordata
- Infraphylum: Agnatha
- Superclass: Cyclostomi
- Class: Petromyzontida
- Order: Petromyzontiformes
- Family: Petromyzontidae
- Genus: Eudontomyzon
- Species: E. stankokaramani

Binomial name
- Eudontomyzon stankokaramani (Karaman 1974)

Synonyms
- Eudontomyzon vladykovi stankokaramani (Karaman 1974)

= Eudontomyzon stankokaramani =

Species of jawless fish

Eudontomyzon stankokaramani, the Drin brook lamprey, is a non-predatory, freshwater resident species of lamprey found in the Drin river system of Albania and Kosovo and the basins of Lakes Ohrid and Shkodra.

== Conservation ==
Eudontomyzon stankokaramani was reclassified as Near Threatened by the IUCN in 2024, having previously been considered Least Concern. Though population trends are unknown, pollution and the building of dams threaten this species.
