= Tetrapleurodon =

Scientific classification
- Kingdom: Animalia
- Phylum: Chordata
- Infraphylum: Agnatha
- Superclass: Cyclostomi
- Class: Petromyzontida
- Order: Petromyzontiformes
- Family: Petromyzontidae
- Genus: Tetrapleurodon (Creaser & Hubbs 1922)

Type species
- Tetrapleurodon spadiceus (Bean 1887)

Synonyms
- Entosphenus (Tetrapleurodon) Creaser & Hubbs 1922

Genus of jawless fishes

Tetrapleurodon is a genus of lampreys, the "Mexican lampreys", that are endemic to the Lerma–Chapala basin in west–central Mexico. Both species are threatened.

== Species ==
There are two recognized species in this genus according to FishBase. They are sometimes included in the genus Lampetra instead.

- Tetrapleurodon geminis Álvarez, 1964 (Mexican brook lamprey)
- Tetrapleurodon spadiceus (T. H. Bean, 1887) (Mexican lamprey)
