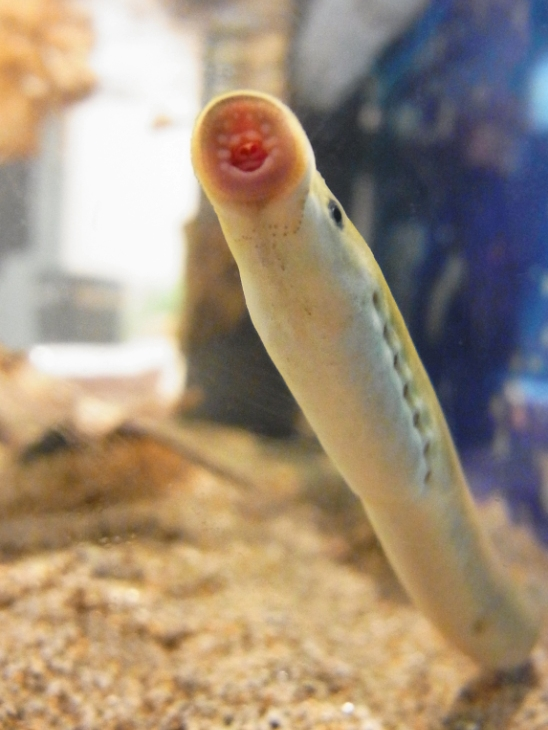

Conservation status
- Least Concern (IUCN 3.1)

Scientific classification
- Kingdom: Animalia
- Phylum: Chordata
- Infraphylum: Agnatha
- Class: Petromyzontida
- Order: Petromyzontiformes
- Family: Petromyzontidae
- Genus: Lethenteron
- Species: L. reissneri

Binomial name
- Lethenteron reissneri (Dybowski, 1869)

= Lethenteron reissneri =

Species of jawless fish

Lethenteron reissneri, the Far Eastern brook lamprey, is a species of lamprey. Immature L reissneri are parasitic, but shift to a non-parasitic feeding strategy upon reaching maturity. It is found in lakes and rivers in China, Japan, Korea, Mongolia, and the Russian Far East. It may be identical to the Siberian brook lamprey, Lethenteron kessleri, but molecular evidence suggests they are cryptic species.
