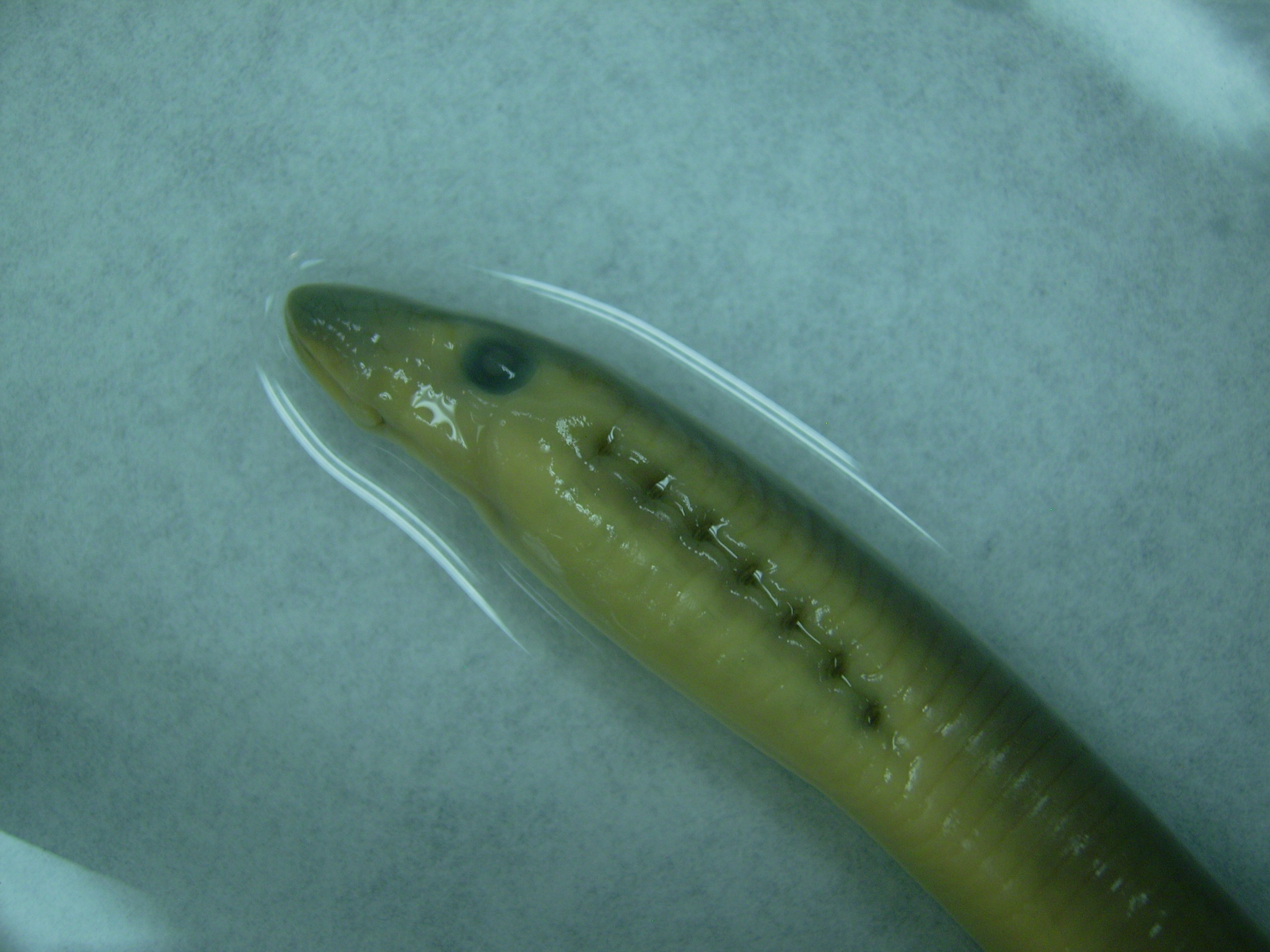
- American brook lamprey late stage transformer (ammocoete metamorphosing into the adult).

Conservation status
- Least Concern (IUCN 3.1)

Scientific classification
- Kingdom: Animalia
- Phylum: Chordata
- Infraphylum: Agnatha
- Superclass: Cyclostomi
- Class: Petromyzontida
- Order: Petromyzontiformes
- Family: Petromyzontidae
- Genus: Lethenteron
- Species: L. appendix

Binomial name
- Lethenteron appendix (DeKay, 1842)

Synonyms
- Petromyzon appendix DeKay 1842; Lampetra appendix (DeKay 1842); Lampetra wilderi Gage 1896; Petromyzon lamottenii Lesueur 1827; Lampetra lamottenii (Lesueur 1827)

= Lethenteron appendix =

American brook lamprey

Species of lamprey

Lethenteron appendix, the American brook lamprey, is a common non-parasitic lamprey in North America. In adults their disc-like mouths contain poorly developed teeth, useless for attaching to a host.

== Description ==
The eggs of the American brook lamprey (ABL) are white, sticky, and small, measuring about 1 mm (0.04 in). When they hatch, the embryos are small as well, measuring less than 5 mm (0.20 in); they are white and wormlike. Within a month they take on the larval appearance. Larvae of all lampreys are called ammocoetes and when small ABL ammocoetes have a dark band running longitudinally along the body, a dark head region, and the remainder of the body is clear. As they increase in size the body becomes increasing darker, reaching a dark brown by the time the ammocoetes reach their maximum size of about 250 mm (10 in). The dark band on the body begins to lighten during this is as well and is not distinct in more mature ammocoetes. However, mature ammocoetes will have a dark spot on the caudal fin. There are likely numerous races of ABL which may have location specific coloration. In Ohio, older ammocoetes have a dark yellow band which runs the entire dorsal surface, as well as pigmentation in the caudal fin. During metamorphosis into the adult form, this coloration changes drastically. Adults in the fall and winter are silver, but can become more black or brownish by the spring when breeding begins. Adults have a dark back, pale belly, yellowish fins, a dark blotch at the end of the tail, and their skin is smooth and leathery and without scales. The body usually retains a silvery appearance at maturation. Adults are usually about 200 mm (8 in) long, although this can be highly variable. ABL are generally found in clear, cold brooks, and small streams.

== Life cycle ==
Ammocoetes of ABL feed on algae and detritus for between three and seven years, before they metamorphose into sexually mature adult fish. Metamorphosis takes place in the late summer and early fall, with adults ready to spawn at the end of winter when spring temperatures are appropriate for egg development (~15 °C). The male(s), aided by a female(s), construct small nests by picking up pebbles with its mouth and moving them to form the rims of a shallow depression. Often adults work in groups, and build the nests communally. During and after construction of the nests, the sticky eggs are deposited in the nest and adhere to the sand and gravel. Adult ABL cannot eat, since they have a nonfunctional intestine, and only live for four to six months. As a result, adult ABL die after spawning.
