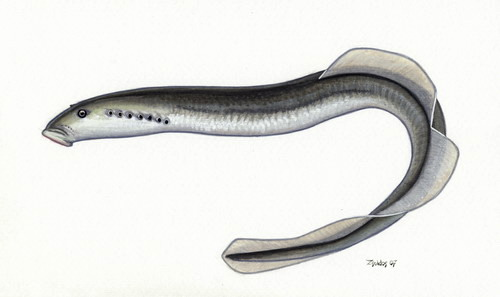

Conservation status
- Least Concern (IUCN 3.1)

Scientific classification
- Kingdom: Animalia
- Phylum: Chordata
- Infraphylum: Agnatha
- Class: Petromyzontida
- Order: Petromyzontiformes
- Family: Petromyzontidae
- Genus: Eudontomyzon
- Species: E. danfordi

Binomial name
- Eudontomyzon danfordi Regan, 1911

Synonyms
- Lampetra danfordi (Regan 1911); Petromyzon danfordi (Regan 1911); Lampetra minor Grossinger 1794; Lampetra bergi Vladykov 1925; Lampetra (Eudontomyzon) gracilis Kux 1965; Eudontomyzon gracilis (Kux 1965)

= Eudontomyzon danfordi =

Species of jawless fish

Eudontomyzon danfordi, the Carpathian brook lamprey or Danube lamprey, is a species of lamprey in the family Petromyzontidae. It is found in Austria, Bosnia and Herzegovina, Bulgaria, Croatia, Czech Republic, Hungary, Moldova, Romania, Serbia, Montenegro, Slovakia, and Ukraine. Unlike other brook lampreys, this fish is parasitic.

== Description ==
The Carpathian brook lamprey grows to a maximum length of 35 centimetres (14 in). It is a long eel-like fish and its girth is greatest in the middle. It is a uniform silvery-olive colour. It has no jaws and the mouth is surrounded by an oral plate with many small blunt teeth. There are cartilaginous plates inside the mouth and the central, lingual plate has nine to thirteen teeth, a fact that distinguishes it from other lamprey species. The single nostril is between the eyes and seven naked gill pores are behind them. The only fins are two dorsal fins that run most of the way along the spine, and a small diamond-shaped tail fin.

== Distribution ==
The Carpathian brook lamprey is found in the Danube river basin, particularly in its tributaries the Tisza and the Timiș. It is a non-migratory, entirely freshwater species.

== Biology ==
Reproduction usually takes place in the winter and march in small brooks and streams. The adults afterwards die. The larvae are called ammocoetes and at first develop among the sand and gravel on the bed of the stream. They feed on detritus, insect larvae and small crustaceans that they filter out of the sediment. They undergo metamorphosis when about four years old. As adults, they feed on living fish or dead sharks, gripping them with their small rasping teeth and swallowing smaller food items whole.

== Conservation status ==
The Carpathian brook lamprey is currently listed as "Least Concern" in the IUCN Red List of Threatened Species. The species faces habitat degradation and lower spawning capabilities due to pollution and dams in their habitat, though this is not enough for them to be included in a higher risk category.
