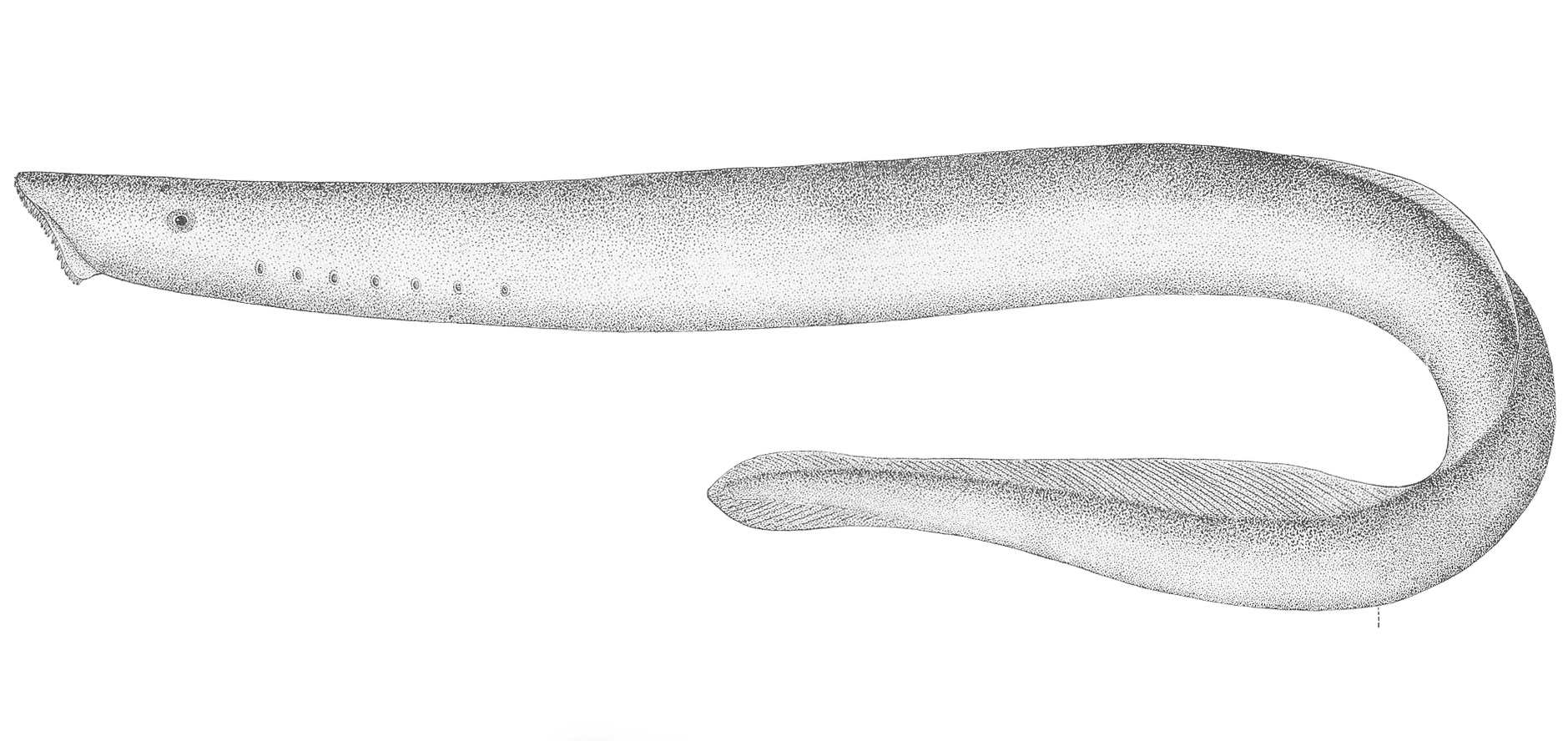

Conservation status
- Least Concern (IUCN 3.1)

Scientific classification
- Kingdom: Animalia
- Phylum: Chordata
- Infraphylum: Agnatha
- Superclass: Cyclostomi
- Class: Petromyzontida
- Order: Petromyzontiformes
- Family: Petromyzontidae
- Genus: Lethenteron
- Species: L. camtschaticum

Binomial name
- Lethenteron camtschaticum (Tilesius, 1811)

Synonyms
- Petromyzon marinus camtschaticus Tilesius 1811; Lampetra camtschatica (Tilesius 1811); Lampetra variegata Tilesius 1811; Petromyzon variegata (Tilesius 1811); Petromyzon lumbricalis Pallas 1814; Petromyzon borealis Girard 1858; Lampetra borealis (Girard 1858); Petromyzon japonicus Martens 1868; Entosphenus lamottei japonicus (Martens 1868); Entosphenus japonicus (Martens 1868); Lampetra fluviatilis japonica (Martens 1868); Lampetra japonica (Martens 1868); Lethenteron japonicum (Martens 1868); Petromyzon kameraticus Dybowski 1869; Petromyzon ernstii Dybowski 1872; Ammocoetes aureus Bean 1881; Lampetra aurea (Bean 1881); Lampetra mitsukurii major Hatta 1911; Lampetra japonica septentrionalis Berg 1931; Lampetra japonica f. praecox Johansen 1935

= Arctic lamprey =

Species of jawless fish

The Arctic lamprey (Lethenteron camtschaticum), also known as the Korean lamprey, Japanese river lamprey or Japanese lampern (Petromyzon japonicus Martens 1868, Lampetra fluviatilis japonica (Martens 1868), Lampetra japonica (Martens 1868), Lethenteron japonicum (Martens 1868) ), is a species of lamprey, a jawless fish in the order Petromyzontiformes. It inhabits coastal freshwater habitat types in the Arctic. Some populations are anadromous, spending part of their lives in the ocean. It is the most common and widespread lamprey in the Arctic region.

== Description ==
This lamprey is usually about 13 to 32 centimetres (5.1 to 12.6 in) long, but specimens have been known to reach 63 centimetres (25 in) and 200 grams (7.1 oz) in weight. Non-anadromous individuals are rarely over 18 centimetres (7.1 in) long. It is brown, gray, or olive in color with a paler belly. There are two dorsal fins located near the tail, the posterior one larger than the anterior. Males are larger than females. The caudal fin has two lobes, the lower longer than the upper. It is continuous with the dorsal and anal fins. The anal fin of the male takes the form of a small ridge.

== Distribution and habitat ==
The Arctic lamprey is a circumpolar species. Its range extends from Lapland eastward to Kamchatka and southward to Japan and Korea. It also inhabits the Arctic and Pacific drainages of Alaska and northwestern Canada. Arctic lampreys exhibit remarkable adaptability through a combination of extensive gene flow among populations, morphobiological flexibility in response to varying environments, and evolutionary conservation of neuropeptide Y receptors, which together support their survival across diverse and changing arctic habitats. The adults live in freshwater habitat near the coast, such as rivers and lakes. It can be found over stony and sandy substrates, and shelters under vegetation.

== Behaviour ==
The adult Arctic lamprey spawns in the gravel of riffles. The ammocoetes, as the lamprey larvae are known, are found in muddy freshwater habitats where they burrow in the mud and feed on detritus. It is generally an anadromous species, living in the ocean before migrating to fresh water to spawn, but some populations are permanent residents of fresh water.

The adult is generally a parasitic feeder that attaches to any of a number of other fish species, including salmon, lake trout, and lake whitefish. The smaller, non-migratory form is not parasitic. The juvenile consumes aquatic invertebrates, algae, and organic debris. This species is prey for other fish such as inconnu, northern pike, and burbot, and gulls feed on spawning aggregations. The eggs and larvae are food for sculpins.

Anadromous variations of Arctic lamprey tend to differ from their freshwater variation which are much smaller in length. However, males in both selections tend to display similar patterns in mate selection with males (regardless of size) preferring the larger, and therefore usually anadromous, females. However, their size limits the ability of freshwater males to copulate with the larger females, and as such they need to utilize sneaking behaviors to fertilize the larger females eggs. Whereas the anadromous lamprey utilize their larger forms and more aggressive behavior to mate with the anadromous females

== Status ==
The Arctic lamprey is a commercially important edible fish with fatty flesh. It is reared in aquaculture. The ammocoetes are used as bait. Threats to the spawning habitat of this species include pollution and the regulation of water flow by damming. Nevertheless, the IUCN has assessed this species as being of "Least Concern".
