= Greek lamprey =

Conservation status
- Endangered (IUCN 3.1)

Scientific classification
- Kingdom: Animalia
- Phylum: Chordata
- Infraphylum: Agnatha
- Superclass: Cyclostomi
- Class: Petromyzontida
- Order: Petromyzontiformes
- Family: Petromyzontidae
- Genus: Caspiomyzon
- Species: C. hellenicus

Binomial name
- Caspiomyzon hellenicus (Vladykov, Renaud, Kott & Economidis, 1982)

Synonyms
- Eudontomyzon hellenicus Vladykov et al., 1982

Species of jawless fish

The Greek lamprey (Caspiomyzon hellenicus) (also known as the Greek or Macedonia brook lamprey) is a species of jawless fish in the Petromyzontidae family. It is endemic to Greece. Its natural habitats are rivers and freshwater springs. It is threatened by habitat loss. Originally considered a species of the genus Eudontomyzon, later phylogenetic analyses suggested that a placement within Caspiomyzon was more likely. It is the most endangered species of lamprey, living only in the Strymon and Louros river basins.
