= Miller Lake lamprey =

Conservation status
- Vulnerable (IUCN 3.1)

Scientific classification
- Kingdom: Animalia
- Phylum: Chordata
- Infraphylum: Agnatha
- Class: Petromyzontida
- Order: Petromyzontiformes
- Family: Petromyzontidae
- Genus: Entosphenus
- Species: E. minimus

Binomial name
- Entosphenus minimus (C. E. Bond & T. T. Kan, 1973)

Synonyms
- Lampetra (Entosphenus) minima Bond & Kan 1973

Species of jawless fish

The Miller Lake lamprey (Entosphenus minimus) is a species of lamprey in the Petromyzontidae family endemic to the United States. Its natural habitat is the Miller Lake drainage in the state of Oregon.

This species is of special interest because it has an extremely limited distribution, with all known animals contained within a single small drainage system, and it is the smallest known parasitic lamprey in the world. The Miller lake lamprey was presumed extinct in 1958, after state fishery managers attempted to eradicate the lamprey from the lake because it was feeding on the introduced trout. The known larval streams for this lamprey were treated with lampricide and a barrier was erected to prevent adults from entering to spawn.

The Miller Lake lamprey was presumed to be extinct until 1992, when it was collected again. Continued collection efforts yielded more animals, and in 2000, the group published a paper on the redescription of this lamprey. In an attempt to restore and protect the Miller Lake lamprey, restoration efforts to remove the barrier originally have been carried out, and surveys are done regularly to establish an understanding of the population's health. Understanding how evolutionary forces could drive speciation of a dwarf parasitic species of lamprey is a potential new area of research for scientists.
