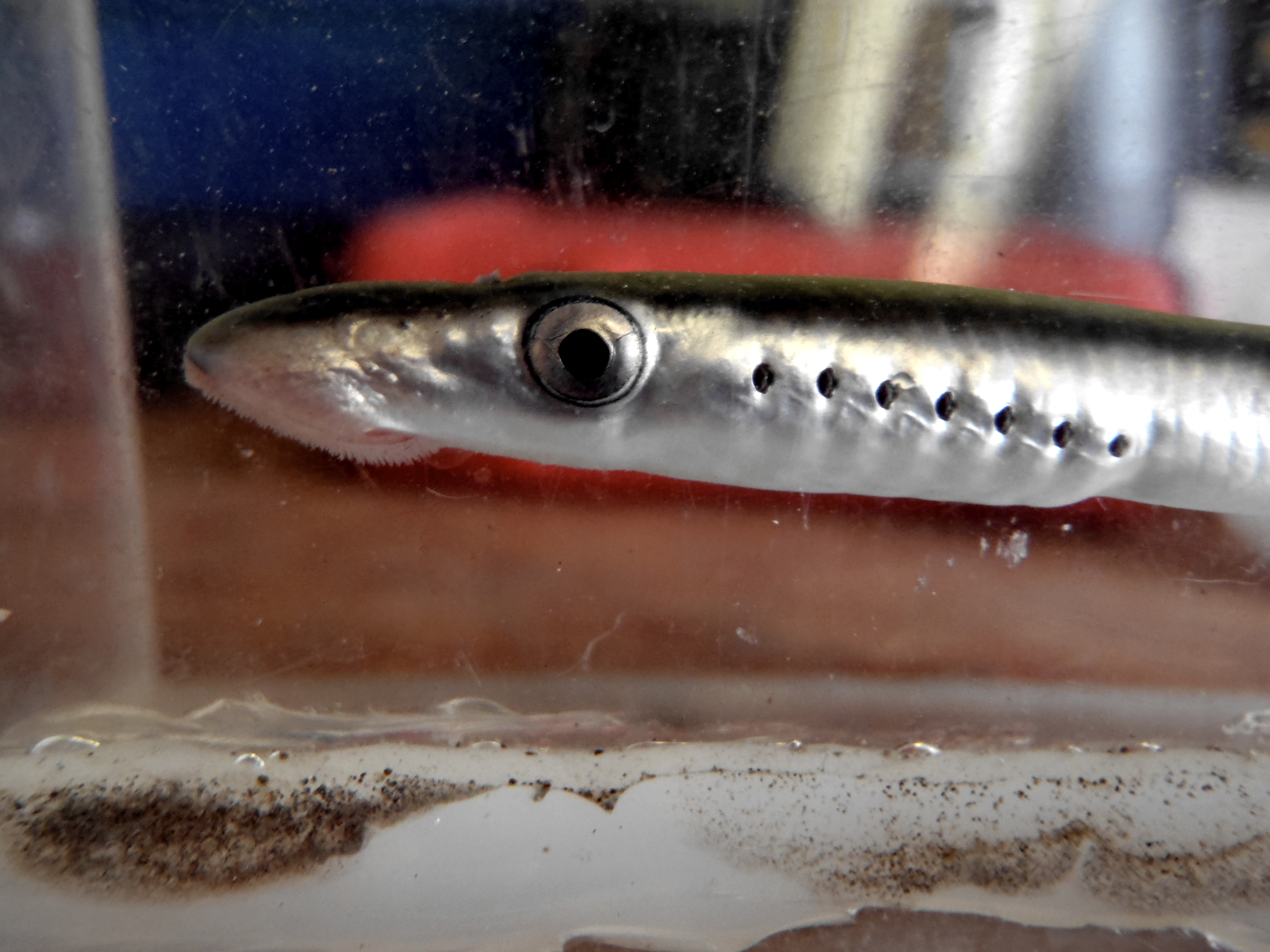
- Juvenile of O. ayresii

Scientific classification
- Kingdom: Animalia
- Phylum: Chordata
- Infraphylum: Agnatha
- Superclass: Cyclostomi
- Class: Petromyzontida
- Order: Petromyzontiformes
- Family: Petromyzontidae
- Genus: Occidentis; Carim et al., 2024

Type species
- Petromyzon ayresii Günther, 1870

Species
- See text

= Occidentis =

Genus of lampreys

Occidentis is a genus of lampreys in the family Petromyzontidae.

== Species ==
- Occidentis ayresii (Günther, 1870) (Western river lamprey)
- Occidentis hubbsi (Vladykov & Kott, 1976) (Kern brook lamprey)
- Occidentis pacifica (Vladykov, 1973) (Pacific brook lamprey)
