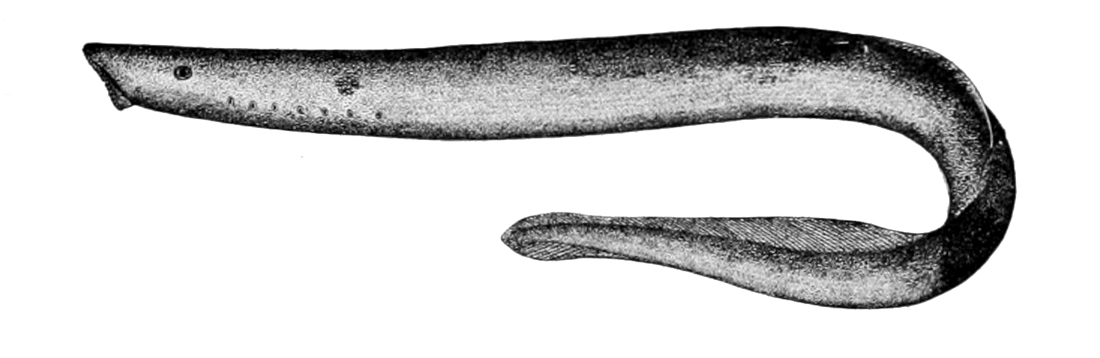
- Lethenteron camtschaticum

Scientific classification
- Kingdom: Animalia
- Phylum: Chordata
- Infraphylum: Agnatha
- Superclass: Cyclostomi
- Class: Petromyzontida
- Order: Petromyzontiformes
- Family: Petromyzontidae
- Genus: Lethenteron; Creaser & Hubbs, 1922

Type species
- Lethenteron appendix (DeKay, 1842)

Synonyms
- Lampetra (Lethenteron) Creaser & Hubbs 1922

= Lethenteron =

Genus of jawless fishes

Lethenteron is a genus of lamprey in the family Petromyzontidae.

== Species ==
There are currently 9 recognized species in this genus:

- Lethenteron alaskense Vladykov & Kott, 1978 (Alaskan brook lamprey)
- Lethenteron appendix (DeKay, 1842) (American brook lamprey)
- Lethenteron camtschaticum (Tilesius, 1811) (Arctic lamprey)
- Lethenteron hattai Iwata, Sakai & Goto, 2024 (Southern Japanese brook lamprey)
- Lethenteron kessleri (Anikin, 1905) (Siberian brook lamprey)
- Lethenteron mitsukurii (Hatta, 1901) (Northern Japanese brook lamprey)
- Lethenteron ninae Naseka, Tuniyev & Renaud, 2009 (Western Transcaucasian lamprey)
- Lethenteron reissneri (Dybowski, 1869) (Far Eastern brook lamprey)
- Lethenteron satoi Sakai, Iwata & Watanabe, 2024 (Fan-tailed brook lamprey)
