= Miller Lake (Carver County, Minnesota) =

Lake in the state of Minnesota, United States

- Location within Minnesota
- Location: Carver County, Minnesota
- Coordinates: 44°47′9″N 93°44′30″W
- Type: lake

Miller Lake is a lake in Carver County, Minnesota, in the United States.

Miller Lake was named for Herman Mueller, an early settler.

== See also ==
- List of lakes in Minnesota
