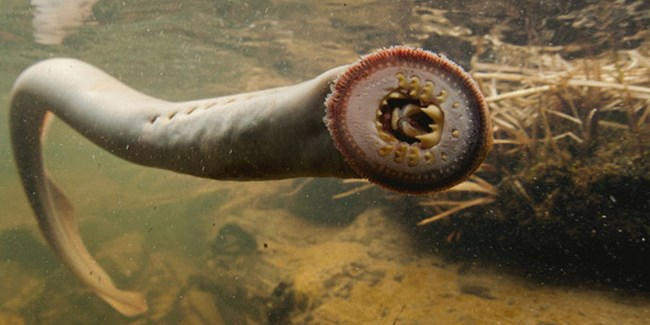

Conservation status
- Least Concern (IUCN 3.1)

Scientific classification
- Kingdom: Animalia
- Phylum: Chordata
- Infraphylum: Agnatha
- Class: Petromyzontida
- Order: Petromyzontiformes
- Family: Petromyzontidae
- Genus: Entosphenus
- Species: E. tridentatus

Binomial name
- Entosphenus tridentatus (Richardson, 1836)

Synonyms
- Petromyzon tridentatus Richardson 1836; Entosphenus tridentatus tridentatus (Richardson 1836); Lampetra tridentata (Richardson 1836); Petromyzon ciliatus Ayres 1855; Petromyzon lividus Girard 1858; Petromyzon astori Girard 1858; Entosphenus epihexodon Gill 1862; Petromyzon epihexodon (Gill 1862)

= Pacific lamprey =

Species of jawless fish

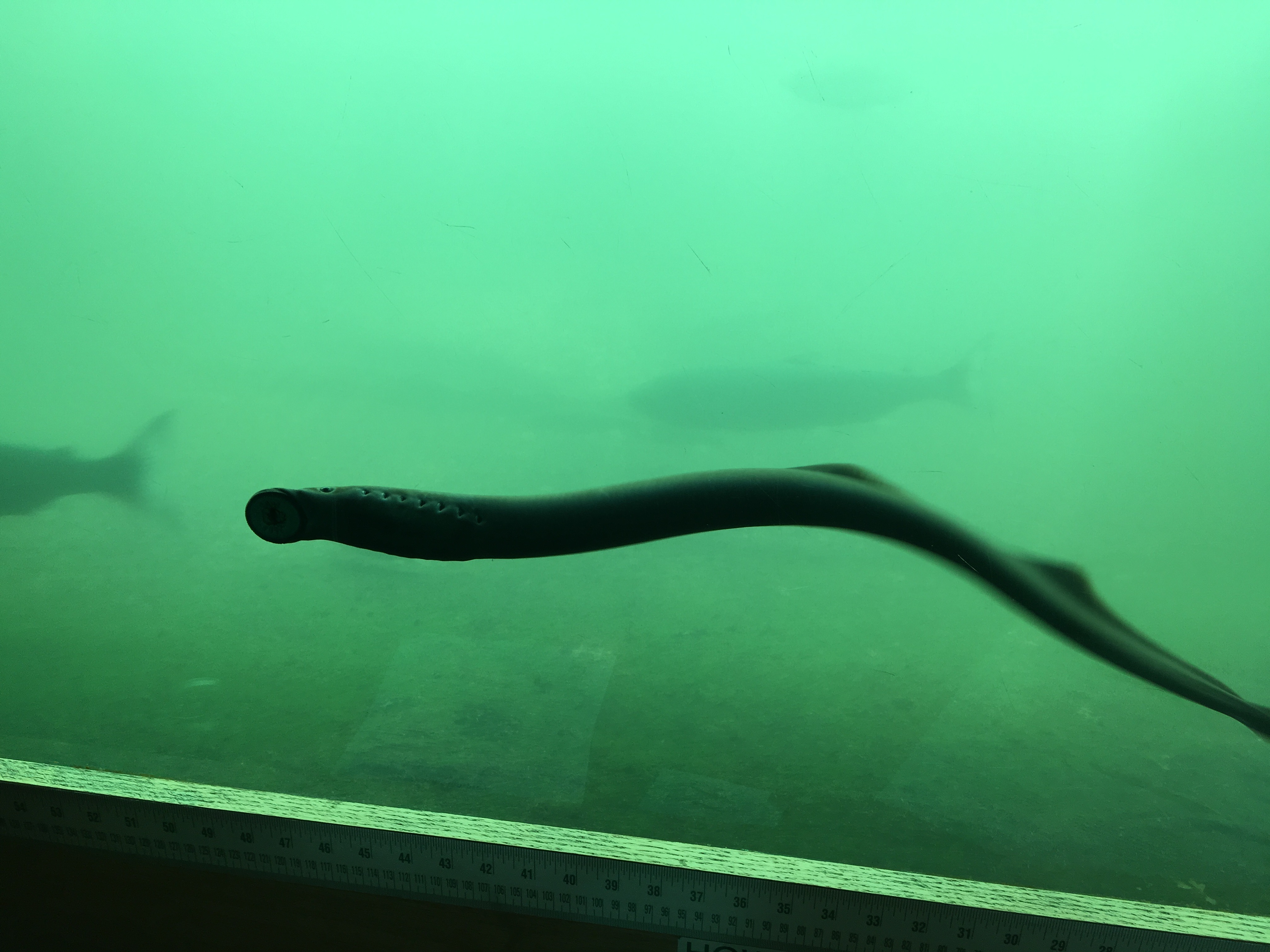
Entosphenus tridentatus at Bonneville Dam in Washington.

The Pacific lamprey (Entosphenus tridentatus) is an anadromous parasitic lamprey from the Pacific Coast of North America and Asia in an area called the Pacific Rim. It is a member of the Petromyzontidae family. The Pacific lamprey is also known as the three-tooth lamprey and tridentate lamprey.

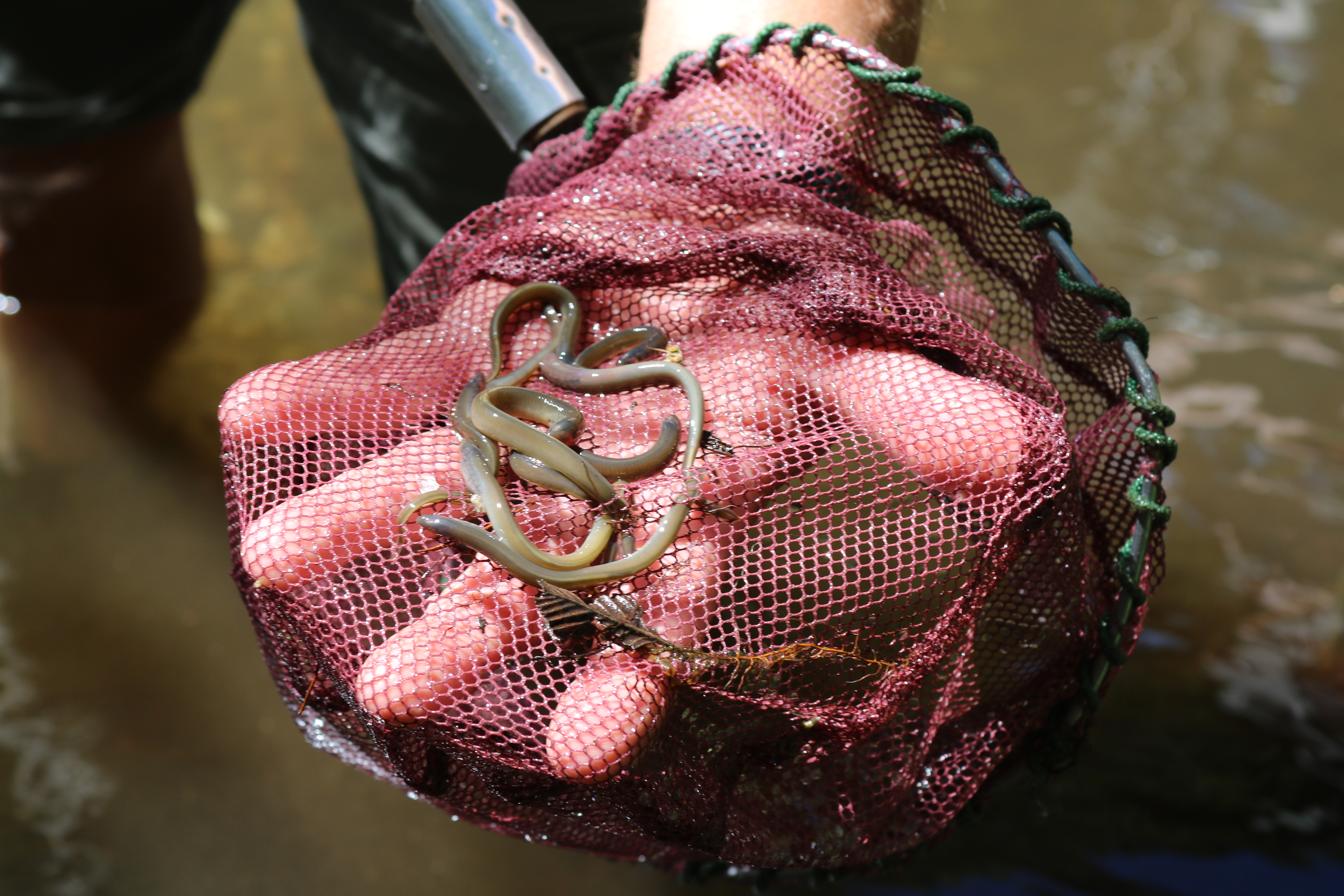
Ammocoetes held by biologist in the Carmel River

== Description ==
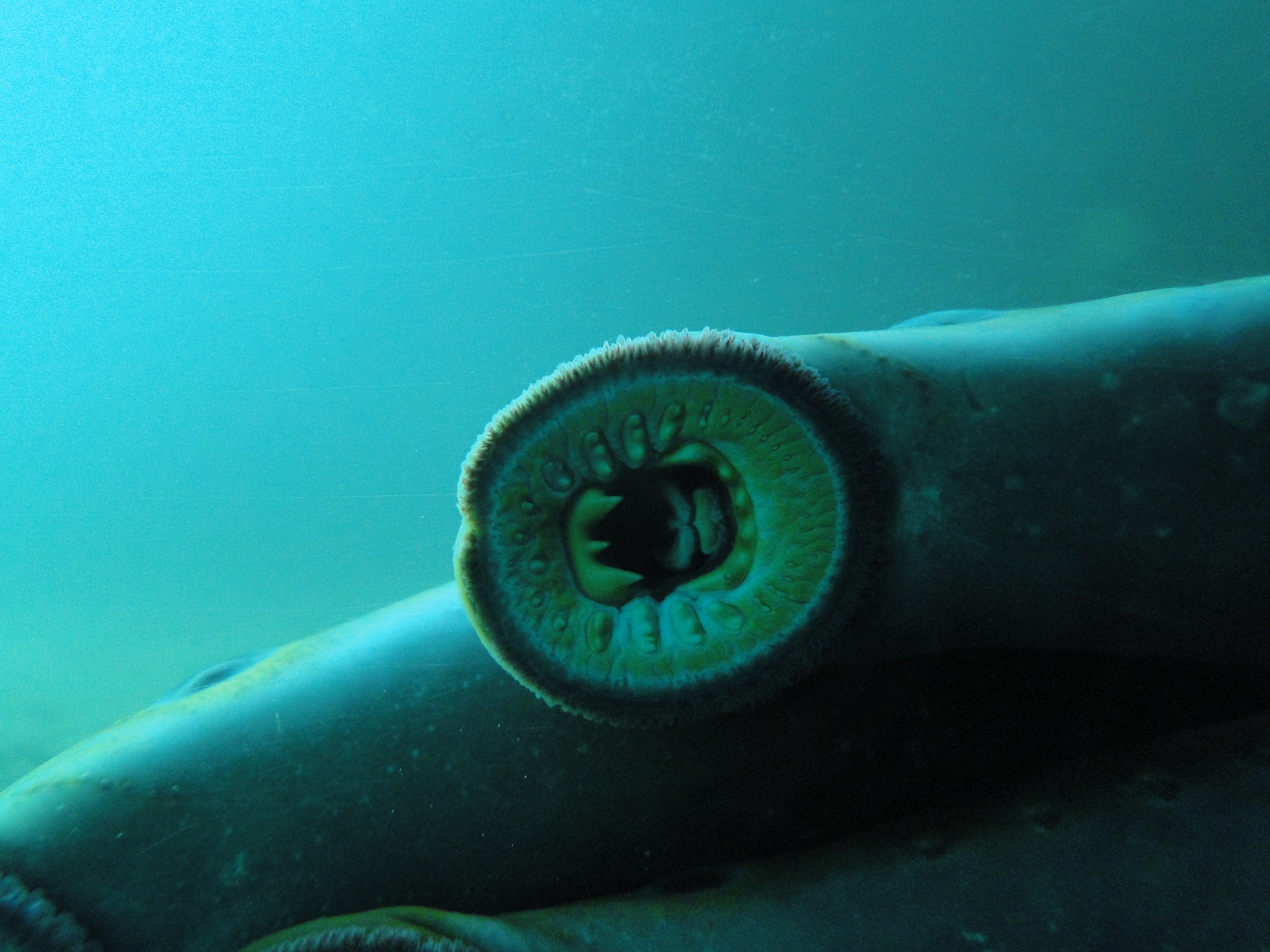
Pacific lampreys passing through the Bonneville Dam.

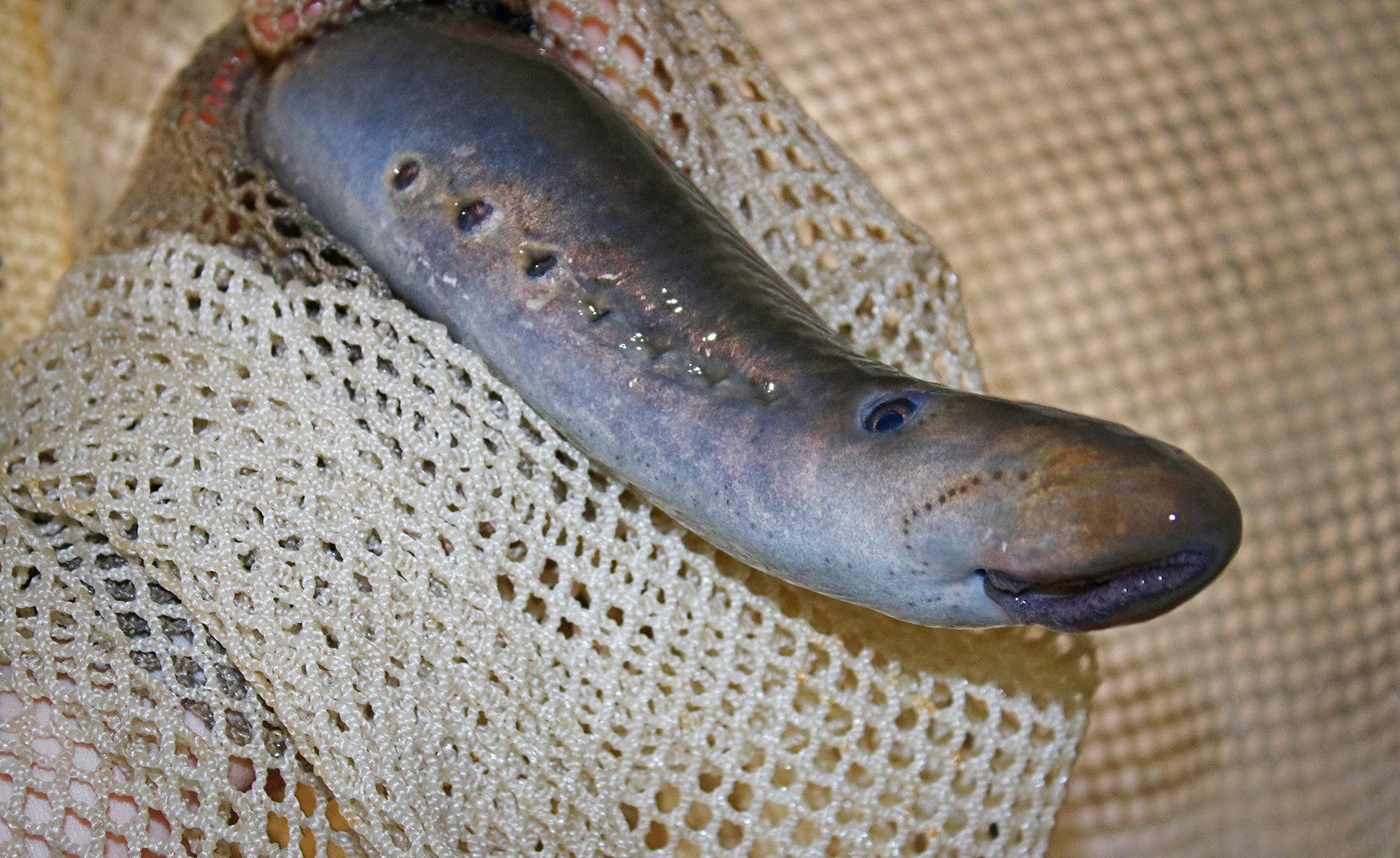
Adult Pacific lamprey in net.

Pacific lamprey are a part of the Family Petromyzontidae and are one of six species within the genus Entosphenus. Pacific lampreys grow to about 80 cm (31 in) as adults. They are anadromous and semelparous. They have slender, elongated bodies with two dorsal fins arising far back on the body. During the larval stage of lamprey, the dorsal fins of are connected. However, after metamorphosis the dorsal fin splits into two distinct dorsal fins. The anal fins are rudimentary and the lower lobe of the caudal fin is larger than the upper lobe and both lobes are continuous with the dorsal fin and the anal fin. Adults living in the sea are a bluish-black or greenish colour above and pale below, but those in fresh water are brown. This species is distinguished by having three (or occasionally two) sharp teeth on the supraoral bar above the mouth and three sharp points on each lateral plate. The Pacific lamprey are often found at sea or often far offshore. At sea, depth: near surface to 1,508 m (4,946 ft)

== Distribution ==
Pacific lampreys live within the Pacific Rim and are native to the areas between the North American coasts and the Bering Sea coasts of Asia. Across the North American Coast, lampreys can be found from Alaska down to Baja California, Mexico. In North America, they occupy streams and rivers across some major river systems such as the Fraser, Columbia, Klamath-Trinity, Eel and Sacramento-San Joaquin rivers.

== Biology ==
Although the adult and juvenile stages are more noticeable, lampreys spend the majority of their lives as larvae (ammocoetes). The embryos of Pacific lamprey hatch approximately 19 days after spawning, once water temperatures reach 59 °F (15 °C). Ammocoetes live in fresh water for many years (usually 3–7 years, but at least one species has been recorded for +17 years). Once the ammocoetes emerge from their embryos, they drift downstream to low velocity waters where fine substrates can be found. Here, they congregate with several other generations of lamprey forming high density colonies. Ammocoetes are filter feeders that draw overlying water into burrows they dig into soft bottom substrates. During the larval stage, they spend most of their time feeding on algae, detritus and microorganisms.

After the larval period, the ammocoetes undergo metamorphosis and take on the juvenile/adult body morphology. At this point, they start to develop eyes, a distinct mouth structure and teeth. Their skin begins to turn from brown to blue-black to greenish on the dorsal side and silver to white on the ventral side. This metamorphosis takes place over the course of several months, beginning in the summer and ending in the winter. After their metamorphosis to juveniles, lampreys eat their first meal by attaching to fish as they migrate downstream to the ocean.

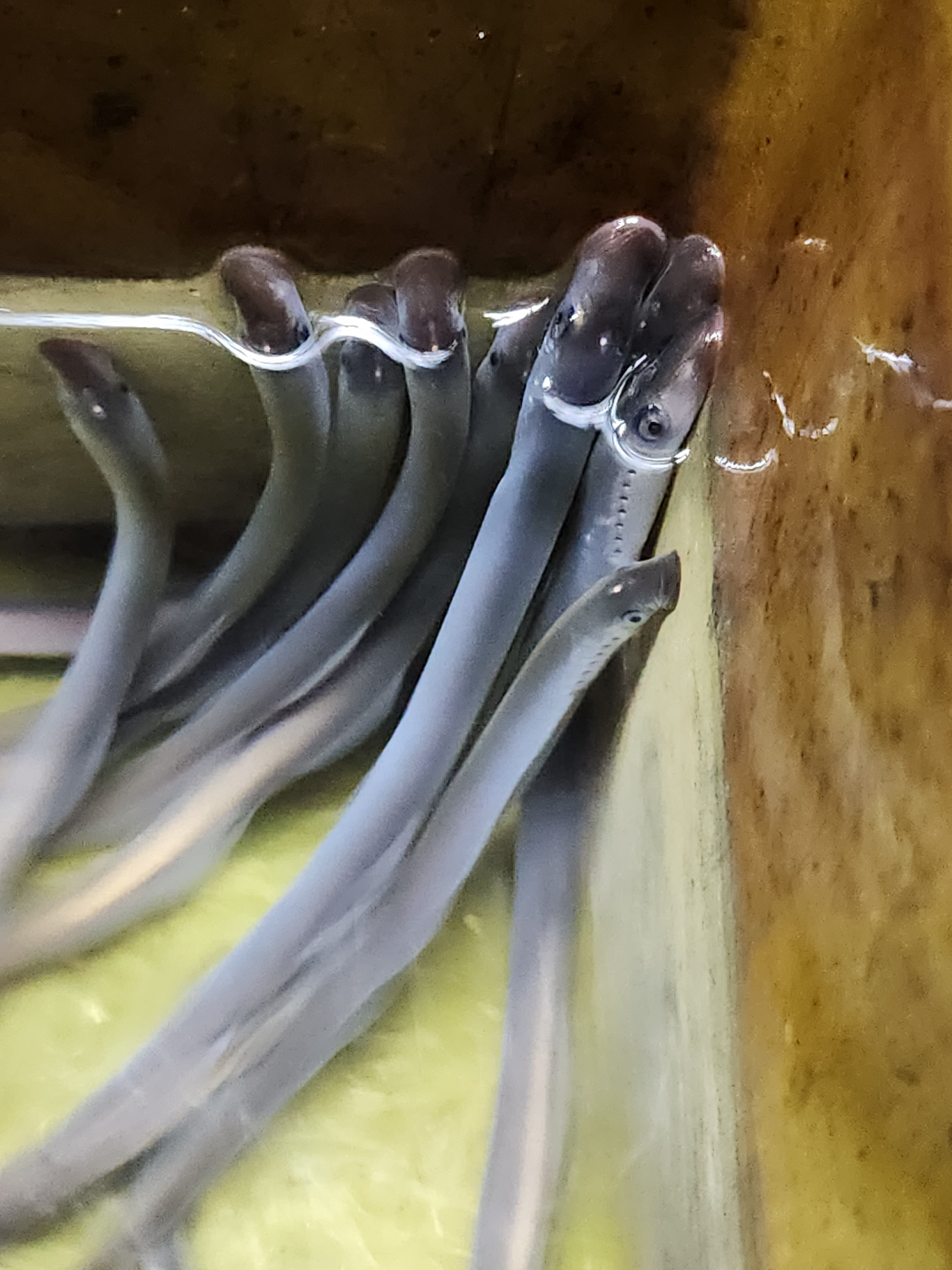
Juvenile Pacific lamprey use their suction mouths to cling to the corner of a holding tank at Abernathy Fish Technology Center in southwest Washington

Juveniles/adults have a jawless, sucker-like mouth that allows them to become parasitic on other fish and sperm whales, attaching themselves with their suckers and feeding on blood and body fluids. Once lamprey reach the ocean, they begin to mature into their adult stage. However, once in the ocean, they become prey to sharks, sea lions and other marine mammals. Lampreys are mostly coastal fish, though they have been caught 62 miles off the west coast and at depths from 300 to 2,600 feet. The adults live at least one to two years in the ocean and then return to fresh water to spawn. Whether Pacific lampreys return to their natal streams or seek spawning areas based on other cues is not known. They typically spawn in similar habitat to Pacific salmon and trout. Lampreys construct a nest (redd) in small gravel, and females can lay over 100,000 eggs, which are fertilized externally by the male. After spawning, the adults usually die within four days. Also, like salmon, the Pacific lamprey does not feed while migrating to spawn. Pacific lamprey can live for seven to eleven years before completing their life cycle

== Fecundity ==
Pacific lamprey digging a nest (red)

Pacific lamprey fecundity varies across the United States. Based on a study from 1975, In the Oregon stream range, female lampreys were spawning 98,000 to 238,400 eggs per female. In contrast to the Oregon stream Range, tributaries of the Columbia River showed varied fecundity. In the Umatilla and Molalla Rivers of the Columbia River, female lampreys were spawning about 522.15 and 503.44 eggs/g body wt (number of eggs per gram of body weight) and 417.94 eggs/g body wt. in the John Day River. The lower relative fecundity of the John Day River could be due in part to energy and resource cost associated with migration.

Fecundity is also directly proportional to lamprey body size meaning that environmental conditions and genetic influences could alter the fecundity of Pacific lamprey The cessation of feeding after migration begins also decreases body size by 18–30% altering the number of eggs spawned.

== Predation ==
Due to their life cycle and their own swimming abilities, Pacific lamprey are easy targets for predators at every stage of life. In spawning grounds, the overflow of eggs in lamprey nests are targeted by fish such as rainbow trout (O.mykiss) and speckled dace (Rhinichthys osculus). As larvae, lampreys are susceptible to predation during two periods: during emergence from nests and during scouring events that dislodge the larvae from their burrows. The larvae are eaten by young coho salmon (Oncorhynchus kisutch) that inhabit the same spawning and rearing grounds. They are also used as bait by fishermen who commonly use lamprey larvae to catch fish like smallmouth bass (Micropterus dolomieui). Even as adults, lamprey still do not have the swimming capabilities to successfully evade predators. Adult lamprey are targets for larger fishes, birds, and mammals Pacific lamprey have a higher caloric value than salmonids. Caloric values of Pacific lamprey range from 5.92 to 6.34 kcal/g wet mass. Their high caloric value and ease of capture make them a priority target over other fishes like salmon.

== Ecological benefits ==
Lampreys are an important dietary source for many species of fishes, birds, and mammals. They provide others with needed nutrients and can even act as a predation buffer for salmonids. Pacific lamprey use the same rivers that many salmonids migrate through. Young lamprey traveling downstream act as buffer for juvenile salmon. They take on part of the predation pressure from fishes and birds, increasing the survivability of young salmonids. Adult lamprey act as a buffer for adult salmonids migrating upstream. They split the predation pressure from mammals allowing for more salmonids to reach spawning grounds. The predation buffer created by lamprey increases the likeliness of salmonids to complete their lifecycles aiding in the population growth of salmonids.

The migration of lamprey also allows for the deposit of marine-derived nutrients into freshwater streams. After successful spawning, pacific lamprey perish, leaving behind their carcasses. As they decompose they release all the nutrient they collected in the ocean into riparian environments. These nutrients aid in the growth of riparian vegetation in and along stream environments.

Even in their larval stage, Pacific lamprey increase the quality of life for other organisms living in stream ecosystems. Filter feeding ammocoetes help to break down particle-borne nutrients (i.e. detritus, diatoms, and algae) into fine particulate matter which can eaten by smaller organisms. This allows for the increased survival of other organisms such as filter-feeding insects. Ammocoetes, with assistance of other small organisms, consume algae in streams and help keep riparian habitats free from algal build up.

== Cultural use and food ==
Pacific lampreys are an important ceremonial food for Native American tribes in the Columbia River basin and the Yurok people and Karuk of the Klamath River Wiyot people of the Eel River in northern California. Pacific lamprey numbers in the Columbia River have greatly declined with the construction of the Columbia River hydropower system. Almost no harvest opportunity for Native Americans remains in the Columbia River and its tributaries except for a small annual harvest at Willamette Falls on the Willamette River (tributary to the Columbia River). The Yurok and Wiyot snag lampreys in the surf at the mouth of the Klamath River, often at night, using hand-carved wooden "hooks". It is dangerous work. Because lampreys are fatty and have a very high caloric count, tribes like the Wiyot and Yurok have traditionally fed them to babies and young children. In terms of tribal cuisine, the lamprey is often smoked over open fires, a method that enhances the flavor and aids in preservation, allowing them to be stored and consumed over extended periods. The smoked lamprey is a staple, featured in various communal feasts. In some tribal communities, lamprey is also prepared in stews, where its meat is combined with herbs and vegetables. The high caloric count also make lampreys an important piece of the river ecosystem, as other animals also rely on them. The documentary film, The Lost Fish, chronicles how current tribal communities are actively studying, breeding, and working to restore lamprey and lamprey habitats to the waterways of the Pacific Northwest. Pacific lampreys also hold deep cultural and spiritual importantce for many indigenous tribes of the Pacific Northwest. They are seen as essential components of the ecosystem, serving both as predators and as prey. The tribes have traditional tales that discuss the lamprey's ecological and cultural significance. Their presence or absence in specific waterways would sometimes be interpreted as omens.

== Ecological issues ==
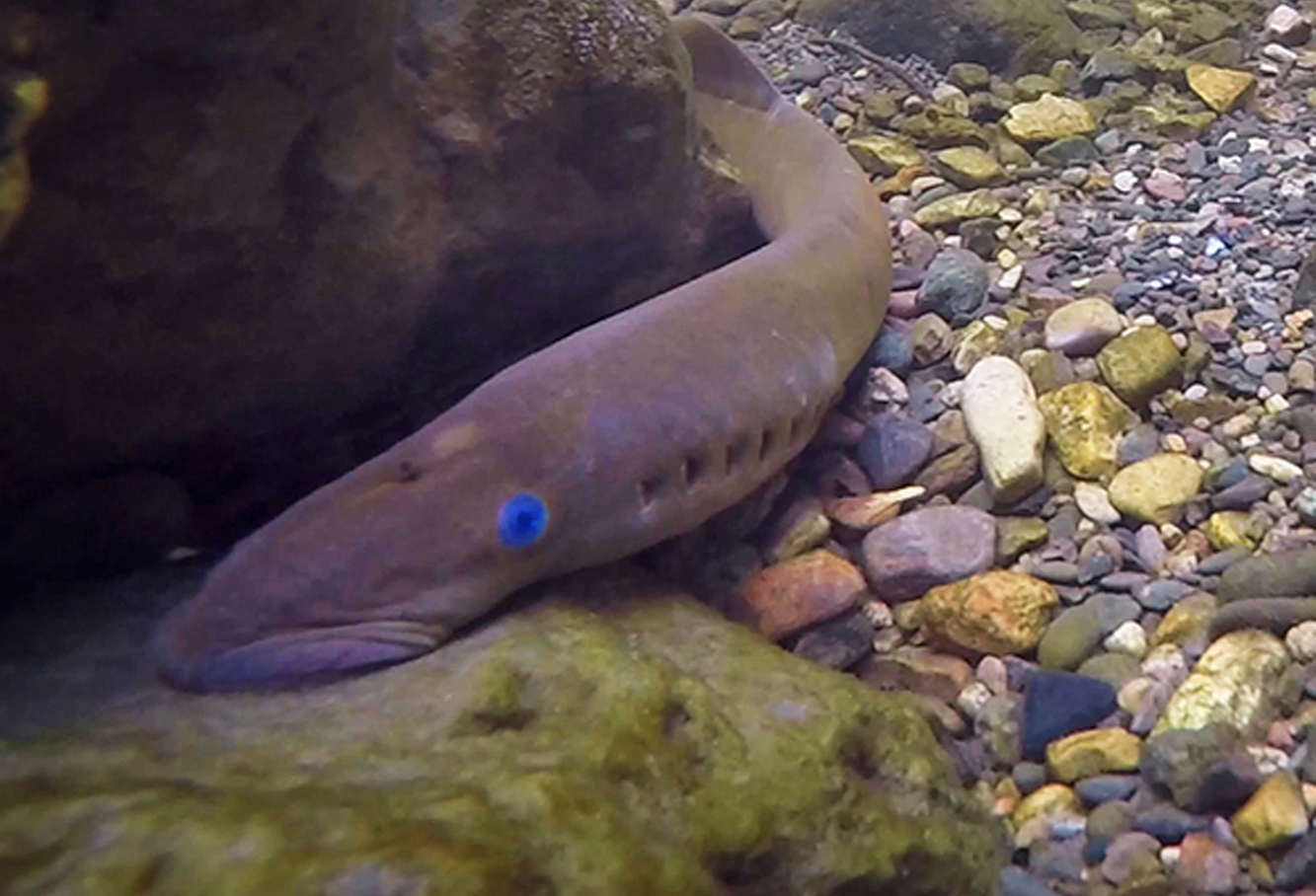
An adult Pacific lamprey attached to a rock in San Luis Obispo Creek. The species returned to the creek in 2017 after a six-year absence.

Pacific lamprey are considered a species of "moderate concern". They still inhabit a large portion of their native range, however abundance in these ranges is declining. Pacific lamprey numbers have greatly decreased due to human infrastructure. Damming rivers, channelization, and declines in water quality have impacted Pacific lamprey habitat and their ability to live. However, restoration of rivers and streams in Southern California has re-established the fish in portions of their historic southern range. The Pacific lamprey returned to San Luis Obispo Creek in San Luis Obispo County in 2017 after a six-year absence and recolonized the Santa Margarita River in San Diego County in August 2019 for the first time since 1940, the farthest south the species had recolonized as of 2020, 260 miles (418 km) south of San Luis Obispo Creek. The Santa Margarita River recolonization has been attributed to a rebuilt weir and new fishway at Camp Pendleton which allowed the lamprey to find passage into the river.

There have also been concerns over the conditions in which Pacific lamprey larva will have to endure in the coming century. The main concern is climate change because we could see temperatures in which the larva live in increase to 27 to 31 °C (81 to 88 °F). The preferred temperature for lamprey hatching is about 18 °C (64 °F), anything more than that could be deadly. Studies have shown that temperatures that exceed 30.7 °C (87.3 °F) is a deadly for the larva, but temperature of up to 27.7 °C (81.9 °F) is manageable for the larva. Depending on the temperature increase, the larva may also exhibit a change in behavior which could lead to its death. The primary behavior change exhibited is in relation to their burrowing habits. Larva exposed to the higher temperatures were observed to experience impaired burrowing. Pacific lamprey larva take a typical amount of time to burrow their hole, however at a higher temperature, typically at or above 27 °C (81 °F) they took significantly longer to burrow. Inactive burrowing also increased in larva who were located in waters at or 27 °C (81 °F) alongside an increase in stopping during their burrowing process.

The Pacific lamprey is not the same fish as the sea lamprey (Petromyzon marinus) that has invaded the Great Lakes via the Erie Canal.

The Pacific lamprey Conservation Initiative (PLCI) emerged as a collaborative effort, comprising Native American tribes, federal, state and local agencies, as well as non-governmental organizations. The collective's aim is to preserve Pacific lampreys as well as their habitats. PLCI is working to achieve long-term persistence of Pacific lamprey, and support the ongoing use for native tribes. The PLCI is composed of three components: the Pacific Lamprey Assessment, Conservation Agreement, and Regional Implementation Plans (RIPS). First is the Pacific Lamprey Assessment, which is conducted by the PLCI and its partners every four to five years to evaluate the habitat conditions, population demographics, distribution, and threats to Pacific lamprey. The second component, Conservation Agreement, is a commitment by natural resource agencies and tribes to utilize combined resources to reduce threats to Pacific lamprey in the face of climate change, and to improve their habitats and population status, and support traditional tribal use of lamprey. The third component known as RIPS divides pacific lamprey distribution into 18 Regional Management Units (RMUs) which allows for conservation efforts to be implemented differently based on each units needed resources. PLCI was initiated in 2008 by the USFWS. A notable collaboration has emerged in the Columbia River basin where several organizations and native tribes have come together under the PLCI to implement various conservation methods.
