= Miller Lake (Oregon) =

Lake in Oregon, United States

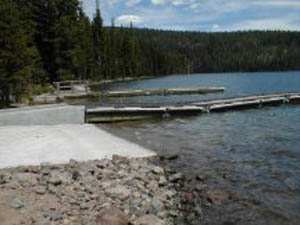

- Location within Oregon Location within the United States
- Location: Klamath County, Oregon
- Coordinates: 43°13′42″N 121°57′36″W
- Type: Natural, oligotrophic
- Primary inflows: Tipsoo, Evening, and Gideon creeks
- Primary outflows: Miller Creek
- Catchment area: 11 square miles (28 km^{2})
- Basin countries: United States
- Surface area: 566 acres (229 ha)
- Average depth: 77 feet (23 m)
- Max. depth: 145 feet (44 m)
- Water volume: 43,700 acre-feet (53,900,000 m^{3})
- Residence time: 2.9 years
- Shore length^{1}: 4.3 miles (6.9 km)
- Surface elevation: 5,633 feet (1,717 m)
- ^{1} Shore length is not a well-defined measure.

Miller Lake is a large natural freshwater lake in the Cascade Range in western Klamath County in the U.S. state of Oregon. The lake is in the Winema National Forest, about 14 miles (23 km) west of Chemult via Miller Lake Road (Forest Road 9772).

Recreation at the lake includes fishing for stocked rainbow and brown trout and kokanee. The lake has been called "one of the best brown trout fisheries in the state". Many brown trout in the lake, which is open for night fishing as well as day fishing, exceed 26 inches (66 cm) in length.

The lake and its drainage system form the sole habitat for the Miller Lake lamprey. The species was nearly exterminated during the 1950s by state wildlife managers, who saw it as a threat to trout populations in the lake. Since its rediscovery in 1992, efforts have been underway to rebuild lamprey populations and reintroduce it to Miller Lake.

Miller Lake is also used for swimming and boating. Hiking trails in the vicinity provide access to the Mount Thielsen Wilderness and the Pacific Crest Trail. Digit Point Campground at the lake has 64 individual camping sites with access to picnic tables, potable water, and toilets. Mosquito infestations may require repellent or headnets.

== See also ==
- List of lakes in Oregon
