= Entosphenus =

Scientific classification
- Kingdom: Animalia
- Phylum: Chordata
- Infraphylum: Agnatha
- Class: Petromyzontida
- Order: Petromyzontiformes
- Family: Petromyzontidae
- Genus: Entosphenus; Gill, 1862

Type species
- Entosphenus tridentatus (Richardson 1836)

Genus of jawless fishes

Entosphenus is a genus of lampreys.

== Species ==
Six species in this genus are recognized:

- Entosphenus folletti Vladykov & Kott, 1976 (Modoc brook lamprey)
- Entosphenus lethophagus (C. L. Hubbs, 1971) (Pit-Klamath brook lamprey)
- Entosphenus macrostomus (Beamish, 1982) (Vancouver lamprey)
- Entosphenus minimus (C. E. Bond & T. T. Kan, 1973) (Miller Lake lamprey)
- Entosphenus similis Vladykov & Kott, 1979 (Klamath river lamprey)
- Entosphenus tridentatus (J. Richardson, 1836) (Pacific lamprey)
