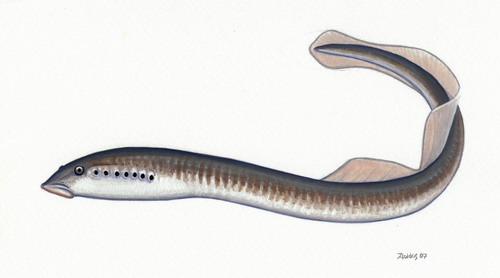
- Eudontomyzon mariae

Scientific classification
- Kingdom: Animalia
- Phylum: Chordata
- Infraphylum: Agnatha
- Class: Petromyzontida
- Order: Petromyzontiformes
- Family: Petromyzontidae
- Genus: Eudontomyzon; Regan 1911

Type species
- Eudontomyzon danfordi Regan 1911

= Eudontomyzon =

Genus of jawless fishes

Eudontomyzon is a genus of lamprey in the family Petromyzontidae. Most species are found in Eastern Europe.

== Species ==
There are currently five recognized species in this genus:

- Eudontomyzon danfordi Regan, 1911 (Carpathian lamprey)
- Eudontomyzon mariae (L. S. Berg, 1931) (Ukrainian brook lamprey)
- Eudontomyzon morii L. S. Berg, 1931 (Korean lamprey)
- Eudontomyzon stankokaramani M. S. Karaman (sr), 1974 (Drin brook lamprey)
- Eudontomyzon vladykovi Oliva & Zanandrea, 1959 (Danubian brook lamprey)

A sixth possible undescribed species, the Ukrainian migratory lamprey, Eudontomyzon sp. nov. 'migratory', became extinct in the late 19th century.
