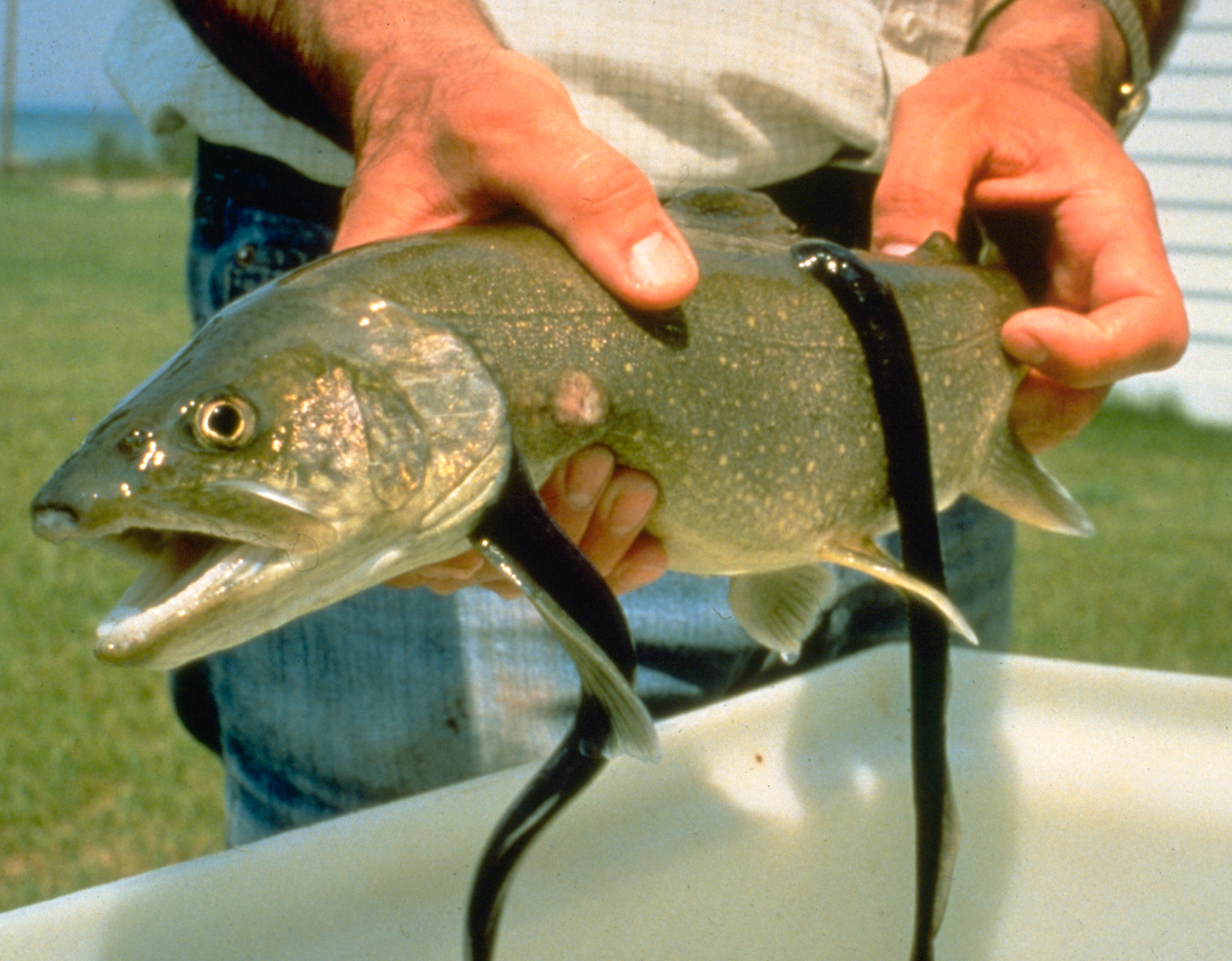
- Sea lampreys (Petromyzon marinus) on a lake trout
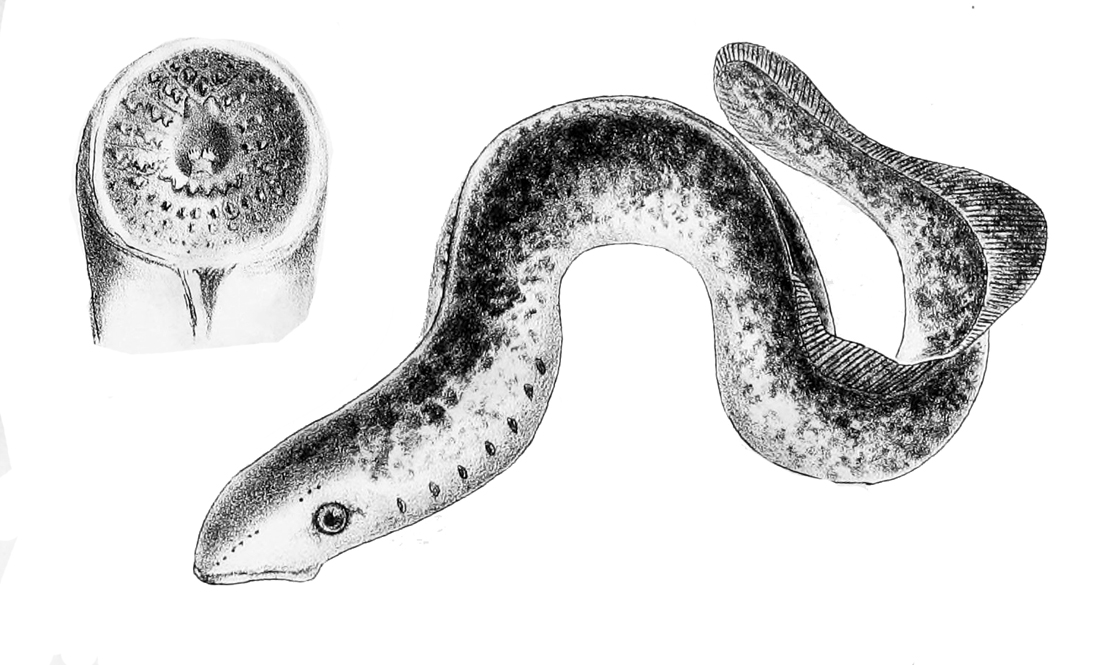

Scientific classification
- Kingdom: Animalia
- Phylum: Chordata
- Infraphylum: Agnatha
- Class: Petromyzontida
- Order: Petromyzontiformes
- Family: Petromyzontidae; A. Risso, 1827

Type genus
- Petromyzon Linnaeus, 1758

Genera
- Caspiomyzon; Entosphenus; Eudontomyzon; Ichthyomyzon; Lampetra; Lethenteron; Petromyzon; Tetrapleurodon; Occidentis

= Petromyzontidae =

Family of lampreys

Petromyzontidae are a family of lampreys native to the Northern Hemisphere, comprising the vast majority of living lampreys. Petromyzontids have the highest number of chromosomes (164–174) among vertebrates.

== Classification ==
Vladykov and Kott (1979) proposed classifying the Northern Hemisphere lampreys into three subfamilies: Petromyzontinae, Entospheninae and Lampetrinae. Also Carim et al. (2024) proposed a genus Occidentis for western North American ‘Lampetra’.

- Subfamily Petromyzontinae
  - Ichthyomyzon
  - Petromyzon — sea lamprey
  - Caspiomyzon
- Subfamily Entospheninae
  - Entosphenus
  - Tetrapleurodon
- Subfamily Lampetrinae
  - Eudontomyzon
  - Lampetra
  - Lethenteron
  - Occidentis
