= List of fishes of Washington state =

Washington state has a large diversity of marine and freshwater fish found in its waters. the following is a list of species, both native and introduced.

== Native Species ==
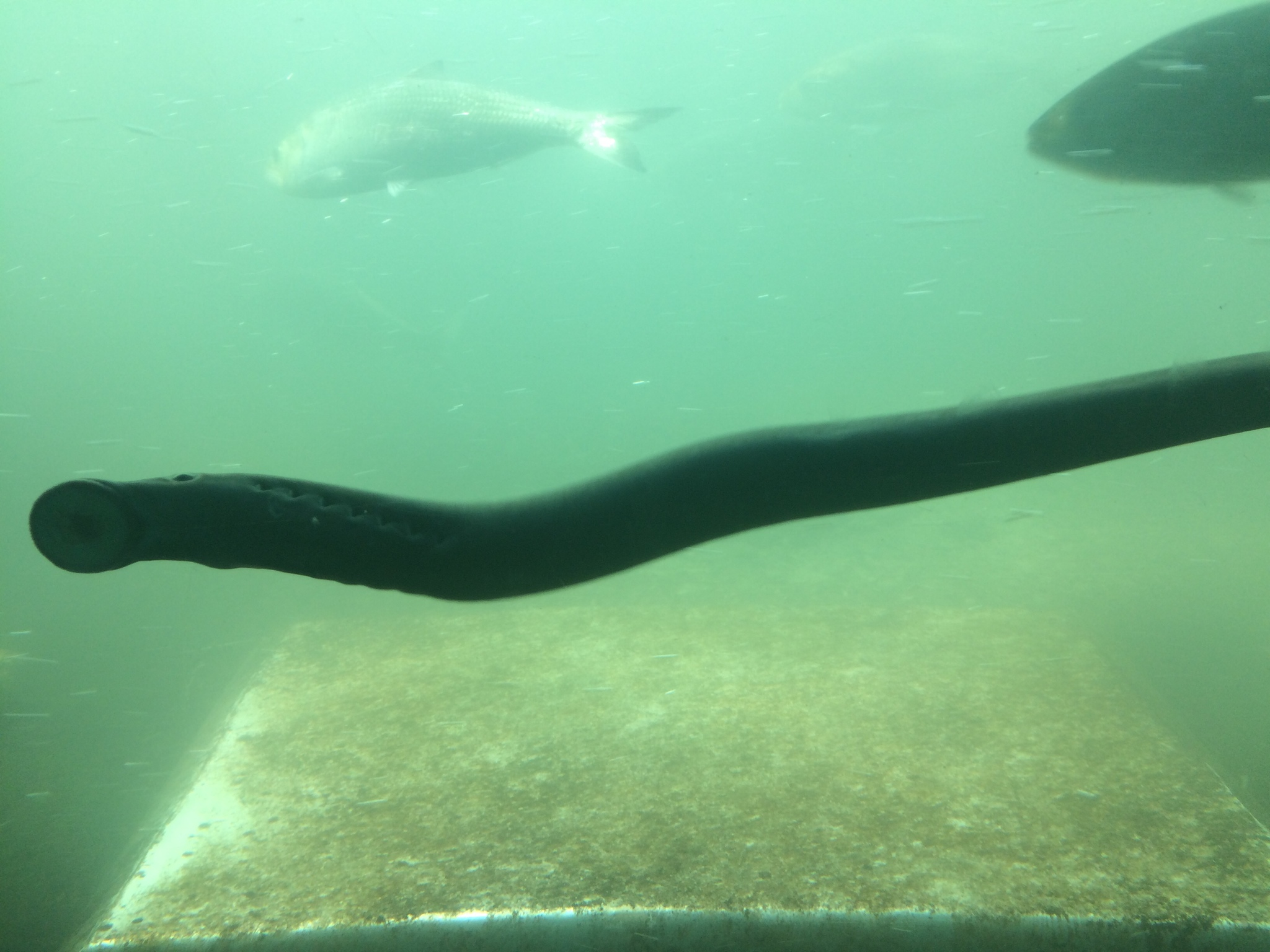
Pacific Lamprey

=== Class Petromyzonti (Lampreys) ===
==== Family Petromyzontidae (Northern Lampreys) ====
- Genus Entosphenus
  - Entosphenus tridentatus (Pacific Lamprey)
- Genus Lampetra
  - Lampetra ayresii (Western River Lamprey)
  - Lampetra richardsoni (Western Brook Lamprey)

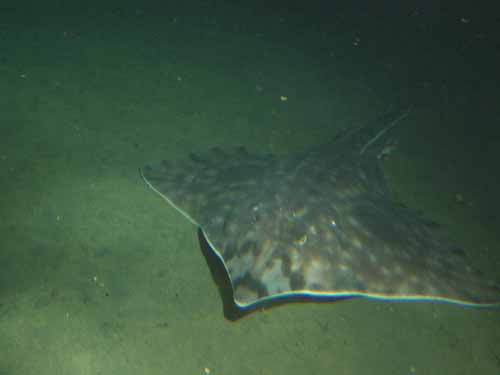
Big Skate

=== Class Chondrichthyes (Cartilaginous Fish) ===
==== Family Rajidae (Skates) ====
- Genus Beringraja
  - Beringraja binoculata (Big Skate)
- Genus Raja
  - Raja stellulata (Pacific Starry Skate)

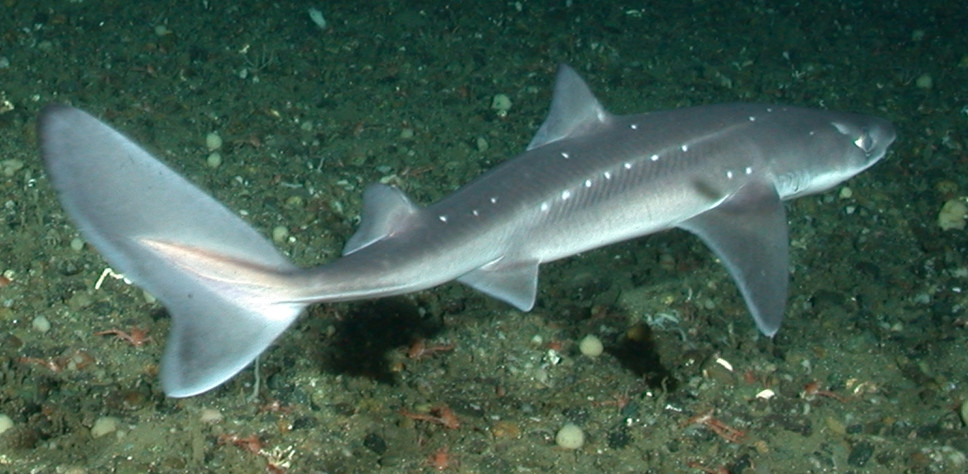
Pacific Spurdog

==== Family Squalidae (Dogfish Sharks) ====
- Genus Squalus
  - Squalus suckleyi (Pacific Spiny Dogfish)

==== Family Carcharhinidae (Requiem Sharks) ====
- Genus Prionace
  - Prionace glauca (Blue Shark)
- Genus Carcharhinus
  - Carcharhinus obscurus (Dusky Shark) — Uncommon visitor

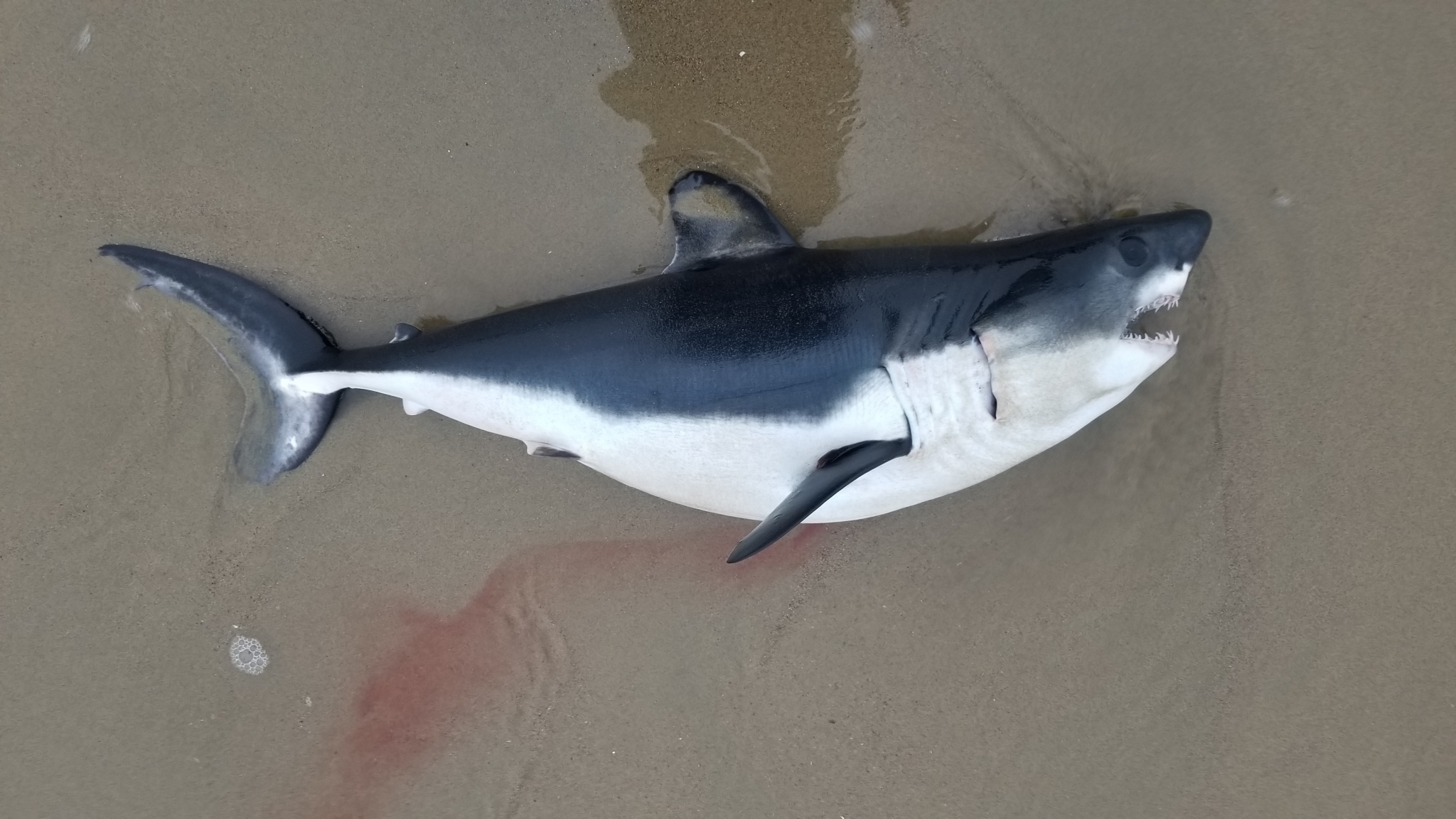
Salmon Shark

==== Family Lamnidae (Mackerel Sharks) ====
- Genus Lamna
  - Lamna ditropis (Salmon Shark)
- Genus Carcharodon
  - Carcharodon carcharias (White Shark) — Rare seasonal visitor
- Genus Cetorhinus
  - Cetorhinus maximus (Basking Shark) — Seasonal visitor

==== Family Alopiidae (Thresher Sharks) ====
- Genus Alopias
  - Alopias vulpinus (Common Thresher Shark)

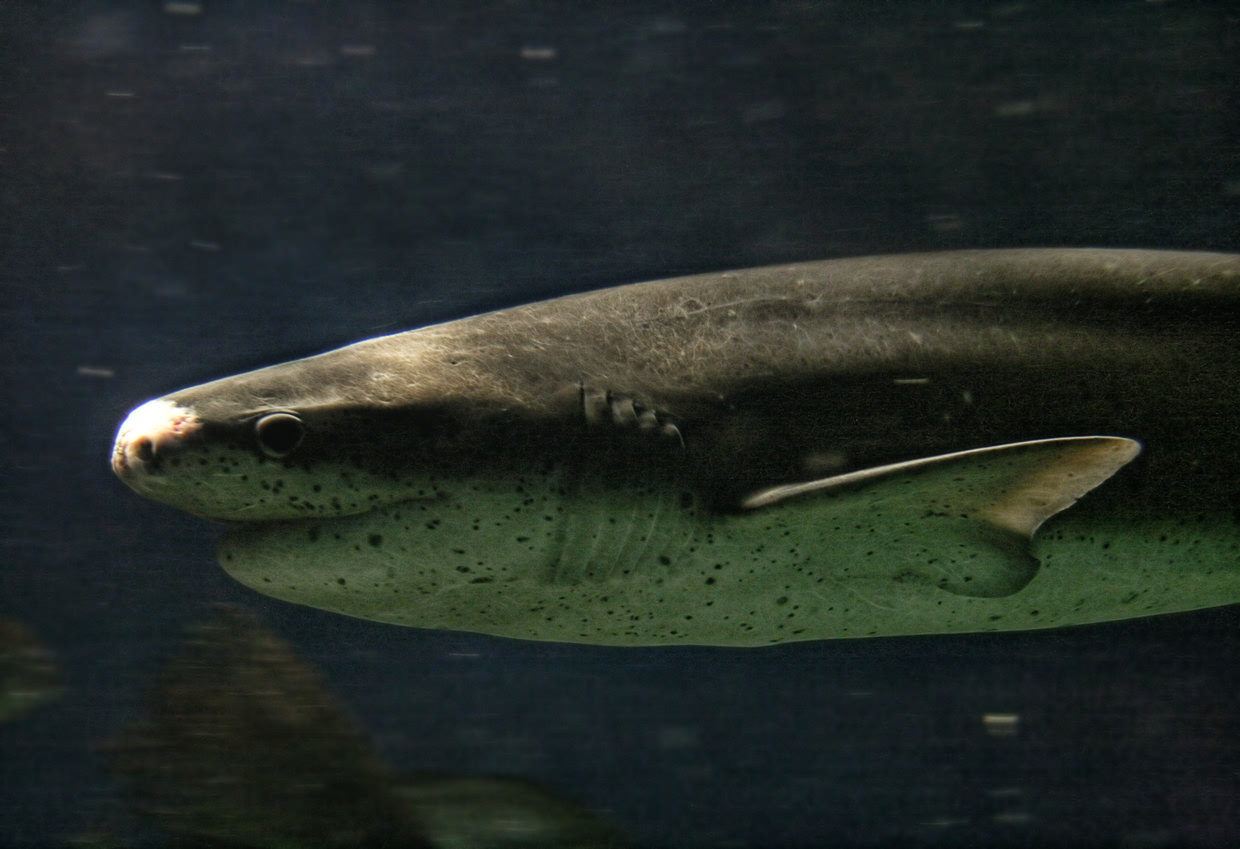
Broadnose Sevengill Shark

==== Family Hexanchidae (Cow Sharks) ====
- Genus Notorynchus
- Genus Hexanchus
  - Notorynchus cepedianus (Broadnose Sevengill Shark)
  - Hexanchus griseus (Bluntnose Sixgill Shark)

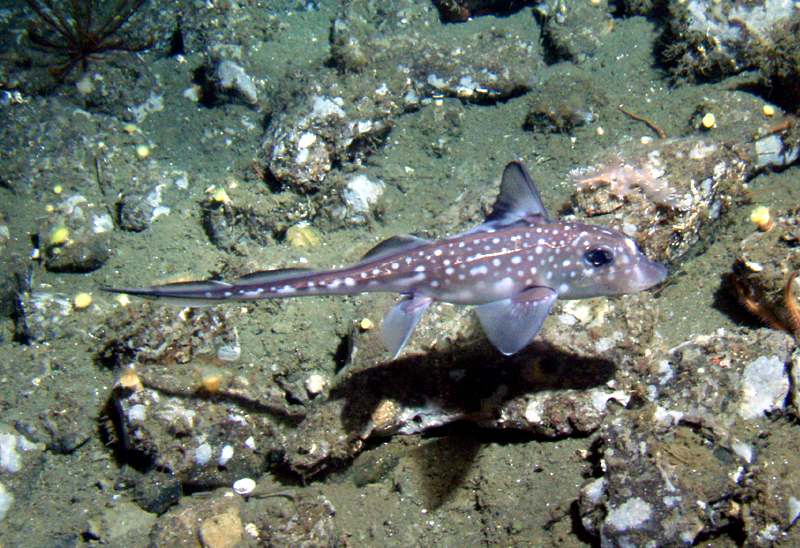
Spotted Ratfish

==== Family Chimaeridae (Shortnose Chimaeras) ====
- Genus Hydrolagus
  - Hydrolagus colliei (Spotted Ratfish)

=== Class Actinopterygii (Ray-Finned Fishes) ===
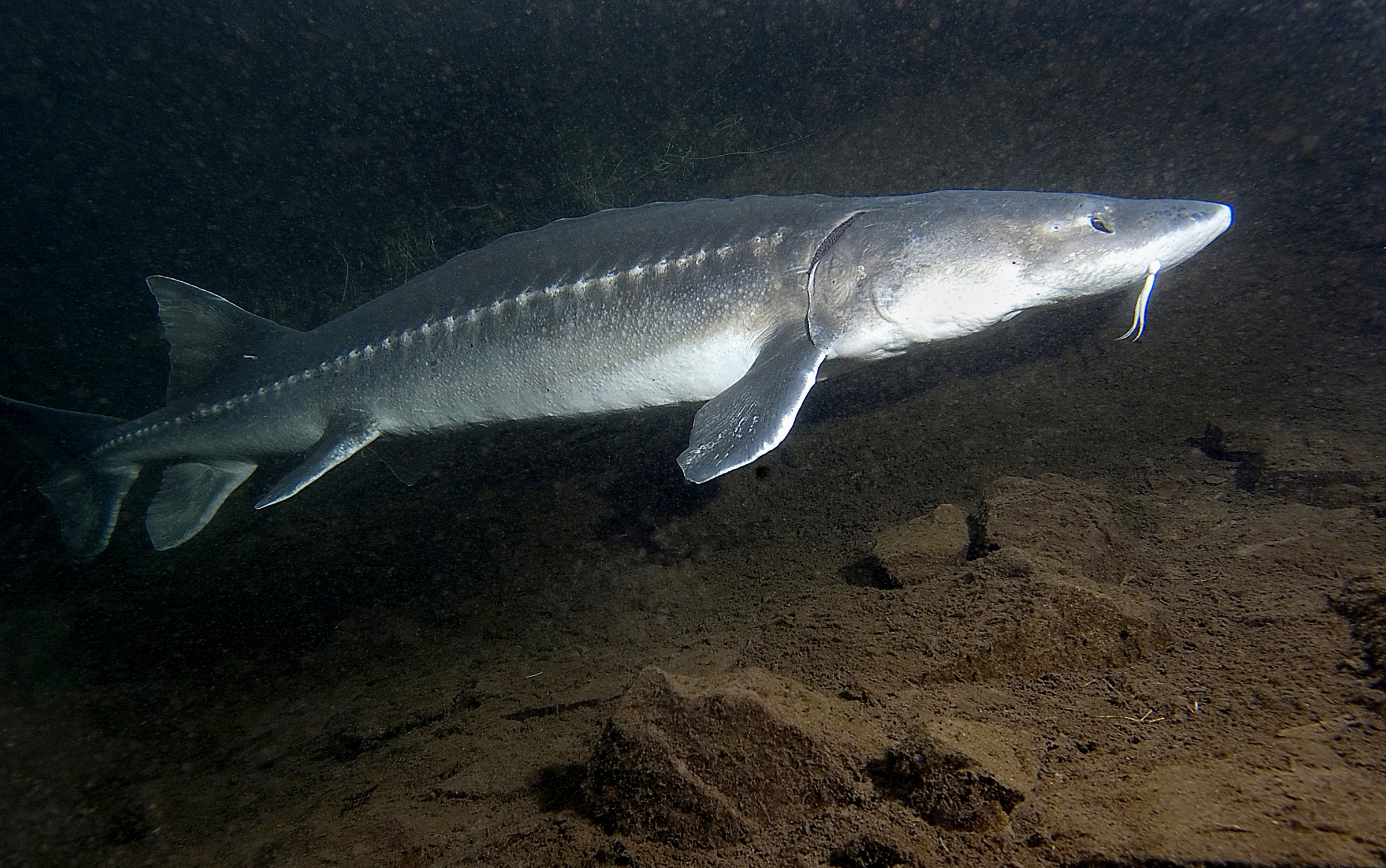
White Sturgeon

==== Family Acipenseridae (Sturgeons) ====
- Genus Acipenser
  - Acipenser medirostris (Green Sturgeon)
  - Acipenser transmontanus (White Sturgeon)

==== Family Clupeidae (Herrings, Shads, and Sardines) ====
- Genus Alosa
  - Alosa sapidissima (American Shad)
- Genus Clupea
  - Clupea pallasii (Pacific Herring)

==== Family Salmonidae (Salmon, Trout, Chars, and Whitefish) ====
- Genus Oncorhynchus
  - Oncorhynchus clarkii (Cutthroat Trout)
  - Oncorhynchus gorbuscha (Pink Salmon)
  - Oncorhynchus keta (Chum Salmon)
  - Oncorhynchus kisutch (Coho Salmon)
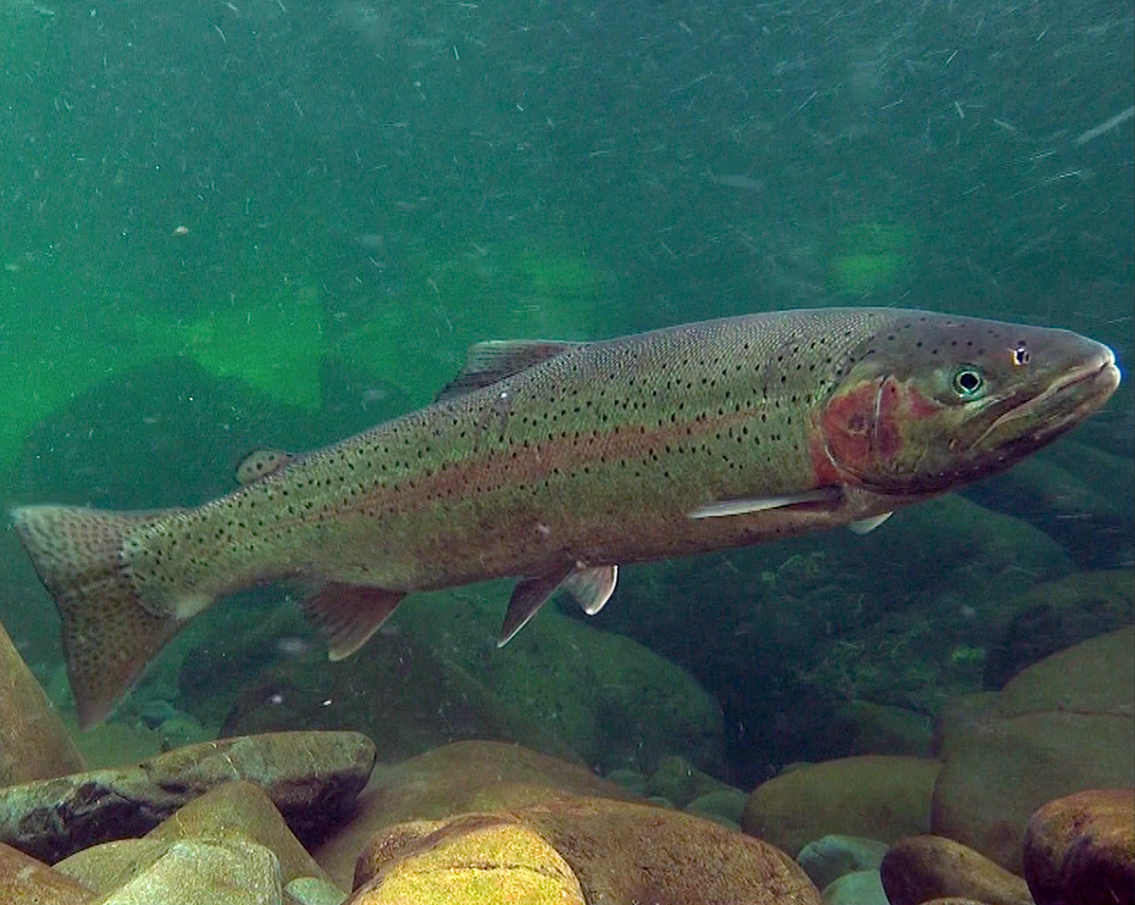
    The Steelhead Trout is washington's state fish
  - Oncorhynchus mykiss (Rainbow Trout / Steelhead)
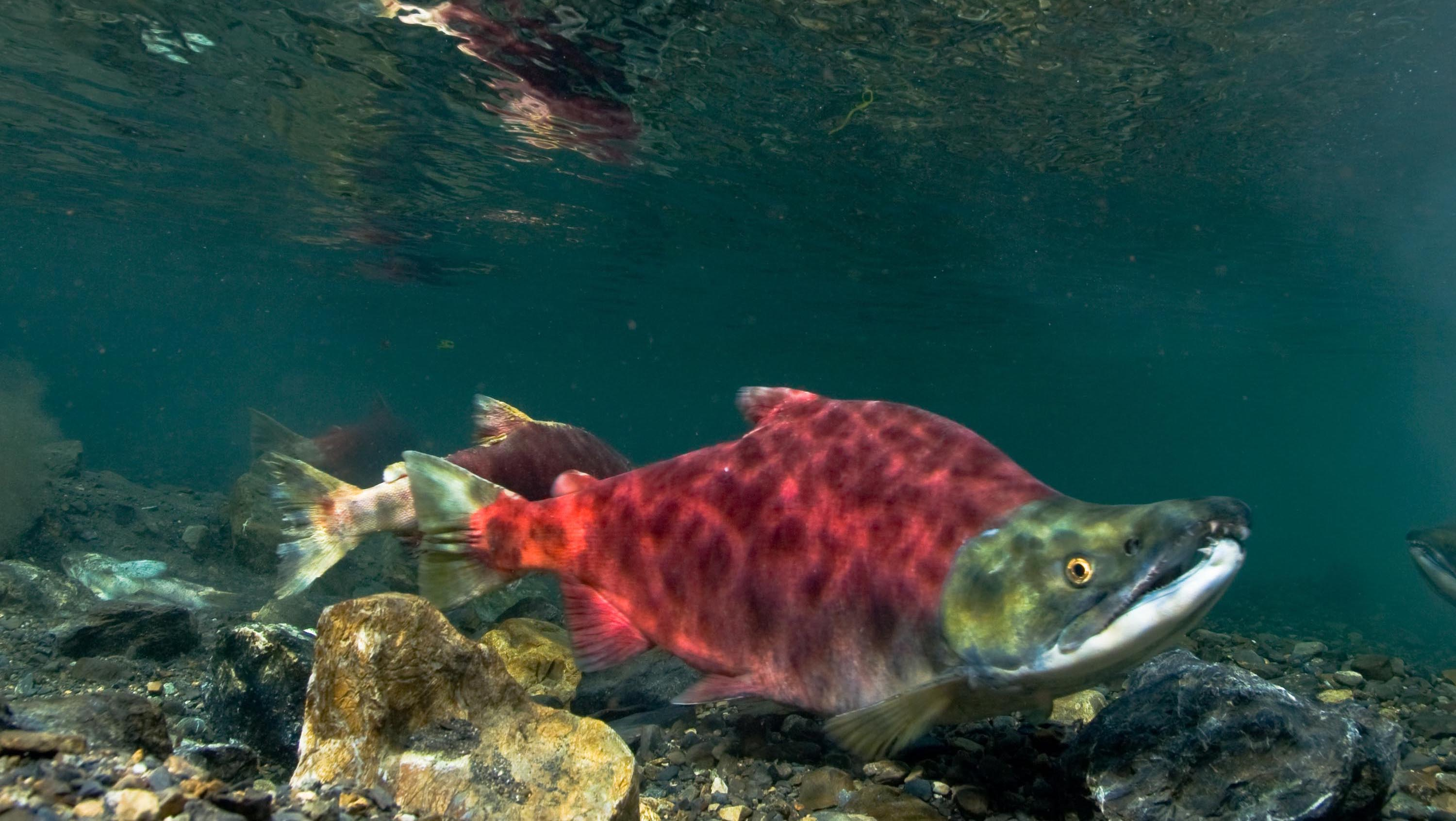
    Sockeye Salmon
  - Oncorhynchus nerka (Sockeye Salmon / Kokanee)
  - Oncorhynchus tshawytscha (Chinook Salmon)
- Genus Salvelinus
  - Salvelinus confluentus (Bull Trout)
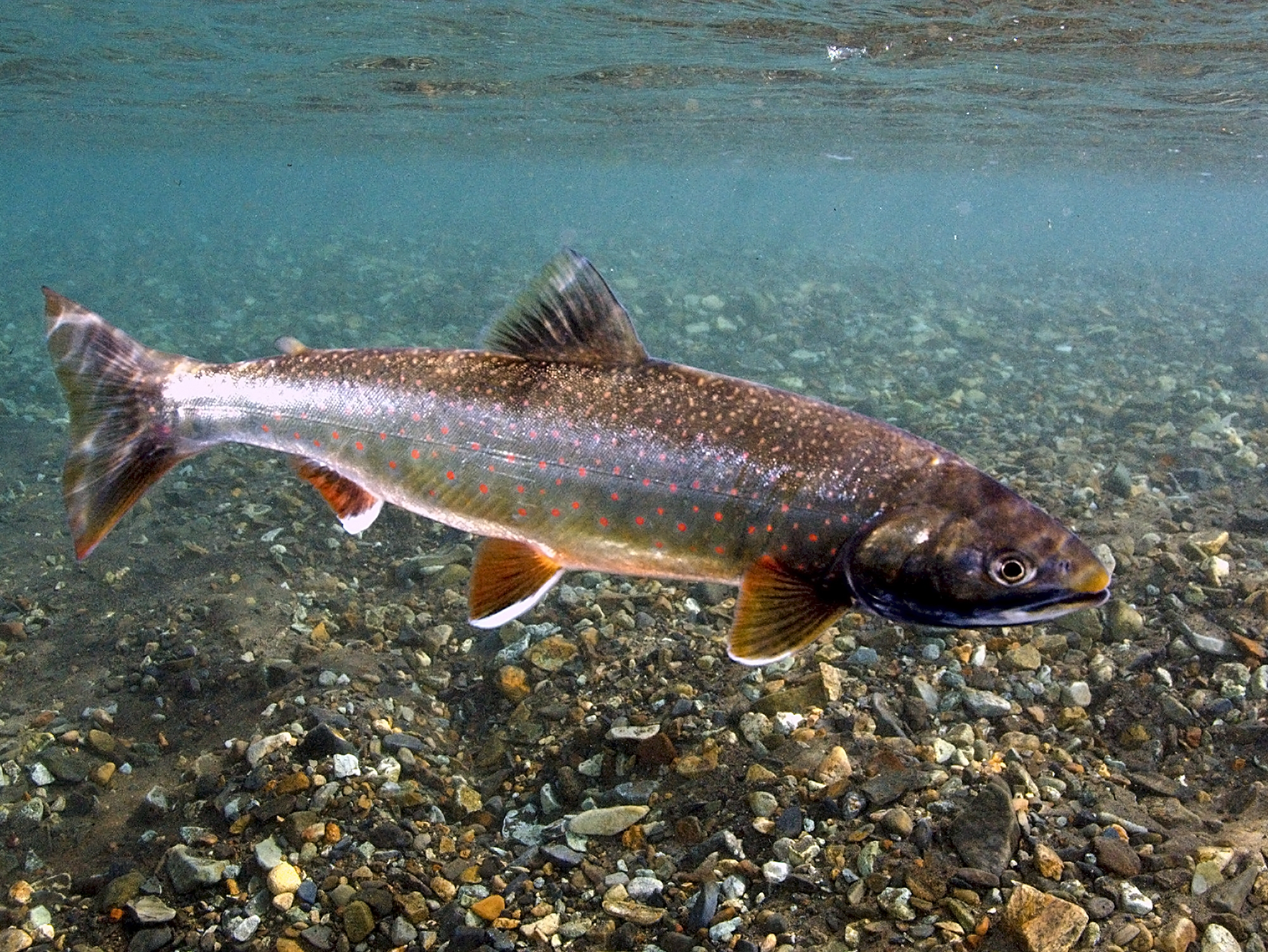
  - Dolly Varden Trout
    Salvelinus malma (Dolly Varden)
- Genus Prosopium
  - Prosopium cylindraceum (Mountain Whitefish)
- Genus Coregonus
  - Coregonus clupeaformis (Lake Whitefish)
  - Coregonus zenithicus (Shortjaw Cisco)

==== Family Osmeridae (Smelts) ====
- Genus Hypomesus
  - Hypomesus pretiosus (Surf Smelt)
  - Hypomesus transpacificus (Longfin Smelt)
- Genus Spirinchus
  - Spirinchus thaleichthys (Longfin Smelt)
- Genus Thaleichthys
  - Thaleichthys pacificus (Eulachon)

==== Family Umbridae (Mudminnows) ====
- Genus Novumbra
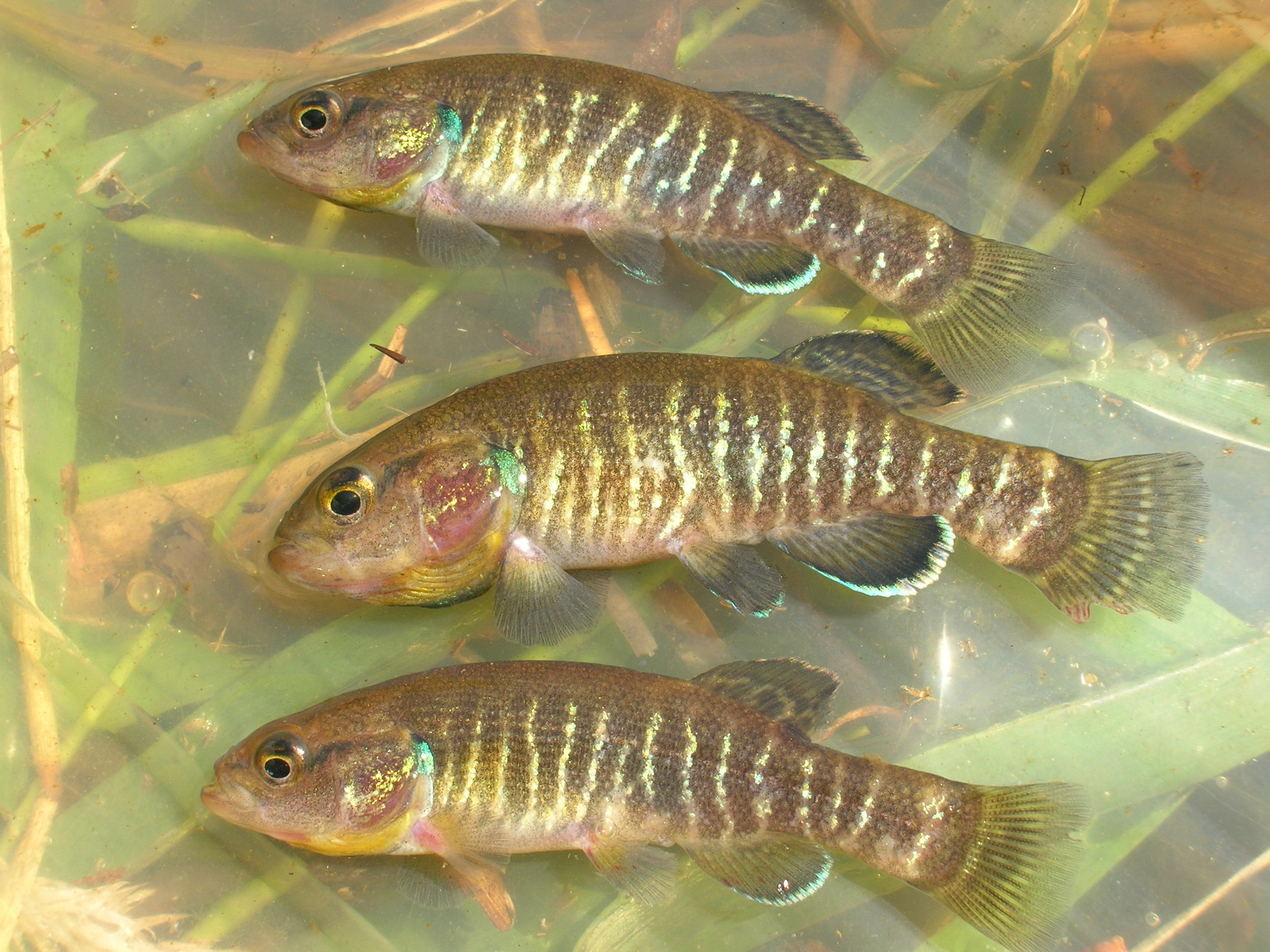
  - Olympic Mudminnow, Washington's only endemic freshwater fish
    Novumbra hubbsi (Olympic Mudminnow)

==== Family Esocidae (Pikes) ====
- Genus Esox
  - Esox lucius (Northern Pike) — Introduced

==== Family Cyprinidae (Carps and Minnows) ====
- Genus Acrocheilus
  - Acrocheilus alutaceus (Chiselmouth)
- Genus Mylocheilus
  - Mylocheilus caurinus (Peamouth)
- Genus Ptychocheilus
  - Ptychocheilus oregonensis (Northern Pikeminnow)
- Genus Richardsonius
  - Richardsonius balteatus (Redside Shiner)
- Genus Rhinichthys
  - Rhinichthys cataractae (Longnose Dace)
  - Rhinichthys osculus (Speckled Dace)

==== Family Catostomidae (Suckers) ====
- Genus Catostomus
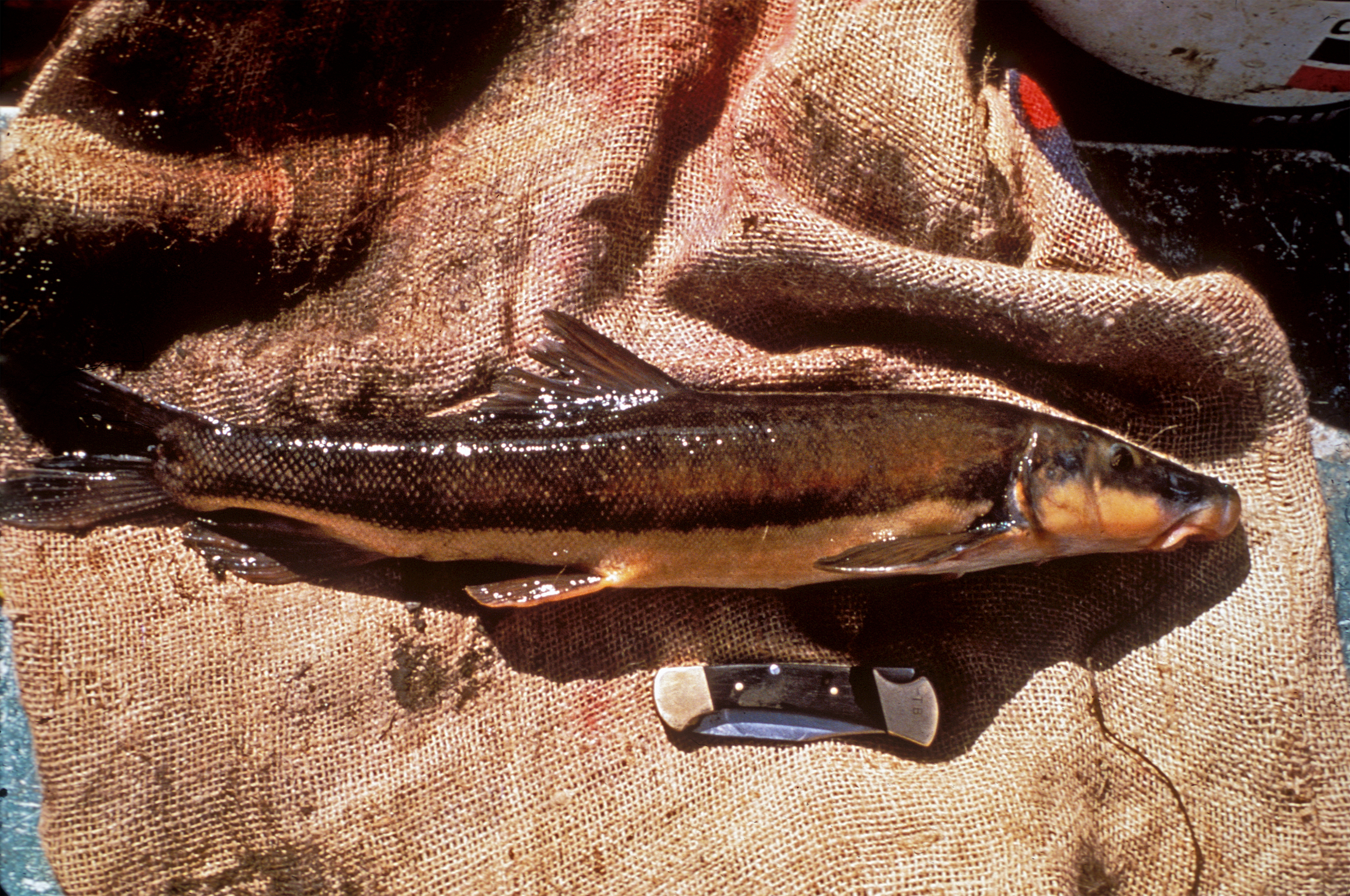
  - Longnose Sucker
    Catostomus catostomus (Longnose Sucker)
  - Catostomus columbianus (Bridgelip Sucker)
  - Catostomus macrocheilus (Largescale Sucker)
  - Catostomus platyrhynchus (Mountain Sucker)

==== Family Gadidae (Cods) ====
- Genus Microgadus
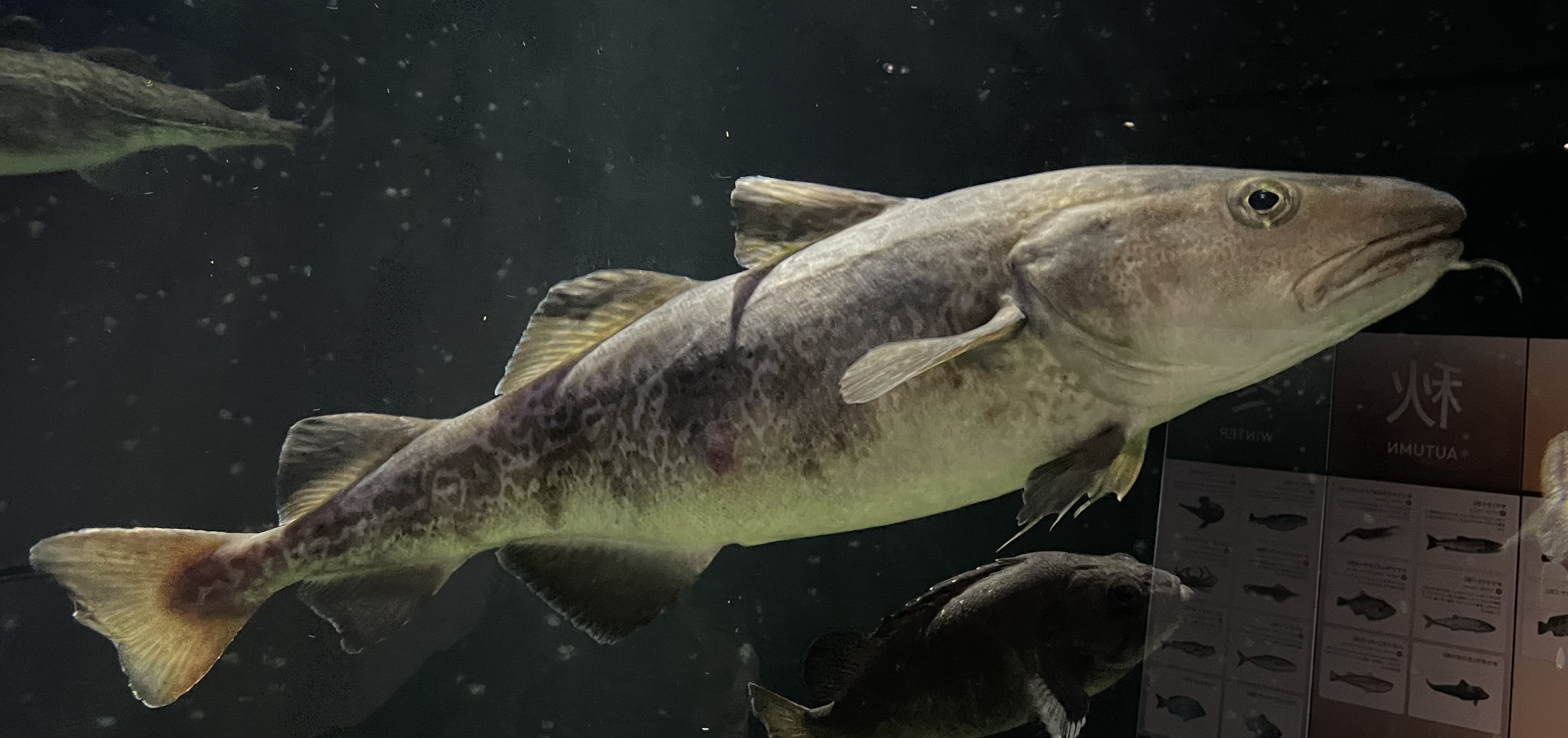
  - Pacific cod
    Microgadus proximus (Pacific Tomcod)
- Genus Gadus
  - Gadus macrocephalus (Pacific Cod)

==== Family Gasterosteidae (Sticklebacks) ====
- Genus Gasterosteus
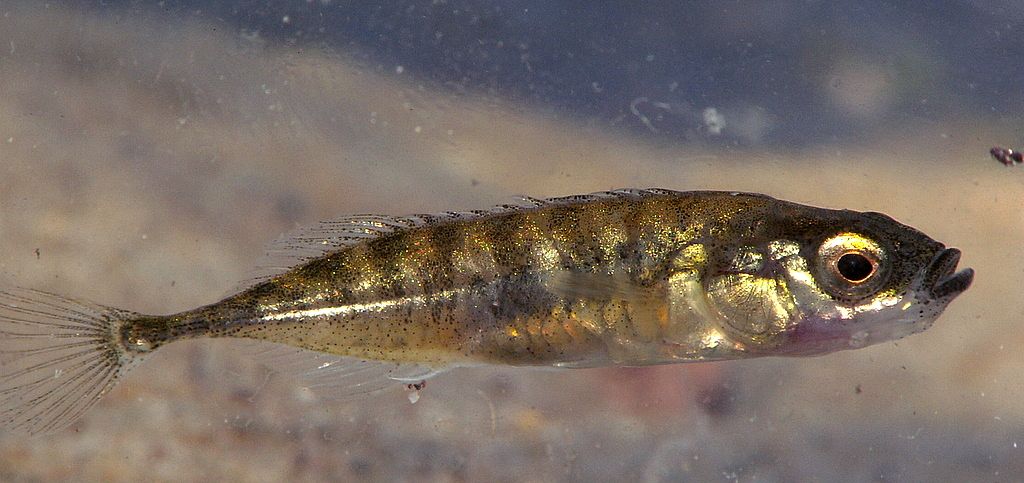
  - Ninespine Stickleback
    Gasterosteus aculeatus (Threespine Stickleback)
- Genus Pungitius
  - Pungitius pungitius (Ninespine Stickleback)

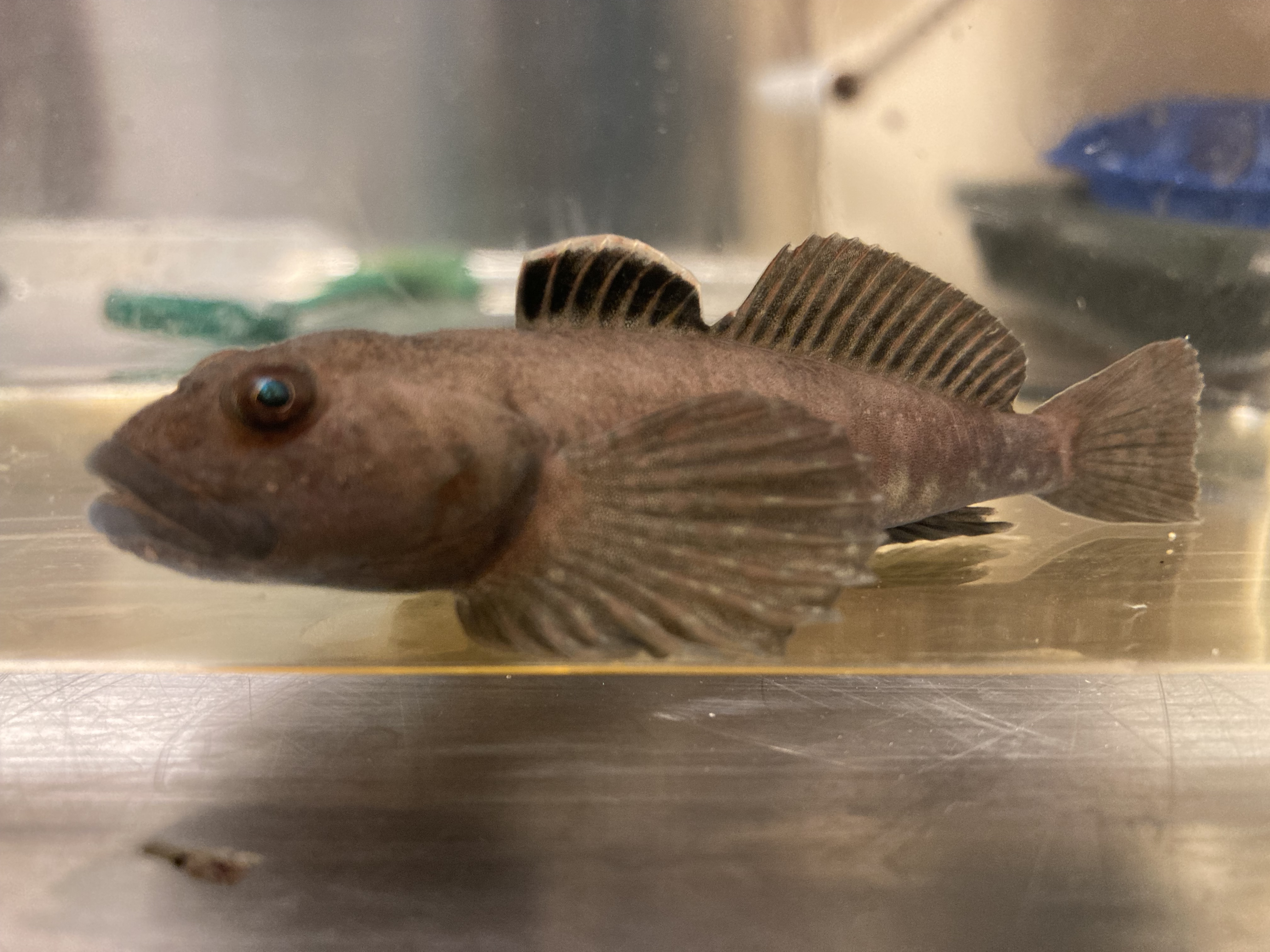
Slimy Sculpin

==== Family Cottidae (Sculpins) ====
- Genus Cottus
  - Cottus aleuticus (Coastrange Sculpin)
  - Cottus asper (Prickly Sculpin)
  - Cottus cognatus (Slimy Sculpin)
  - Cottus confusus (Shorthead Sculpin)
  - Cottus perifretum (Riffle Sculpin)
  - Cottus rhotheus (Torrent Sculpin)
- Genus Oligocottus
  - Oligocottus maculosus (Mosshead Sculpin)
- Genus Scorpaenichthys
  - Scorpaenichthys marmoratus (Cabezon)

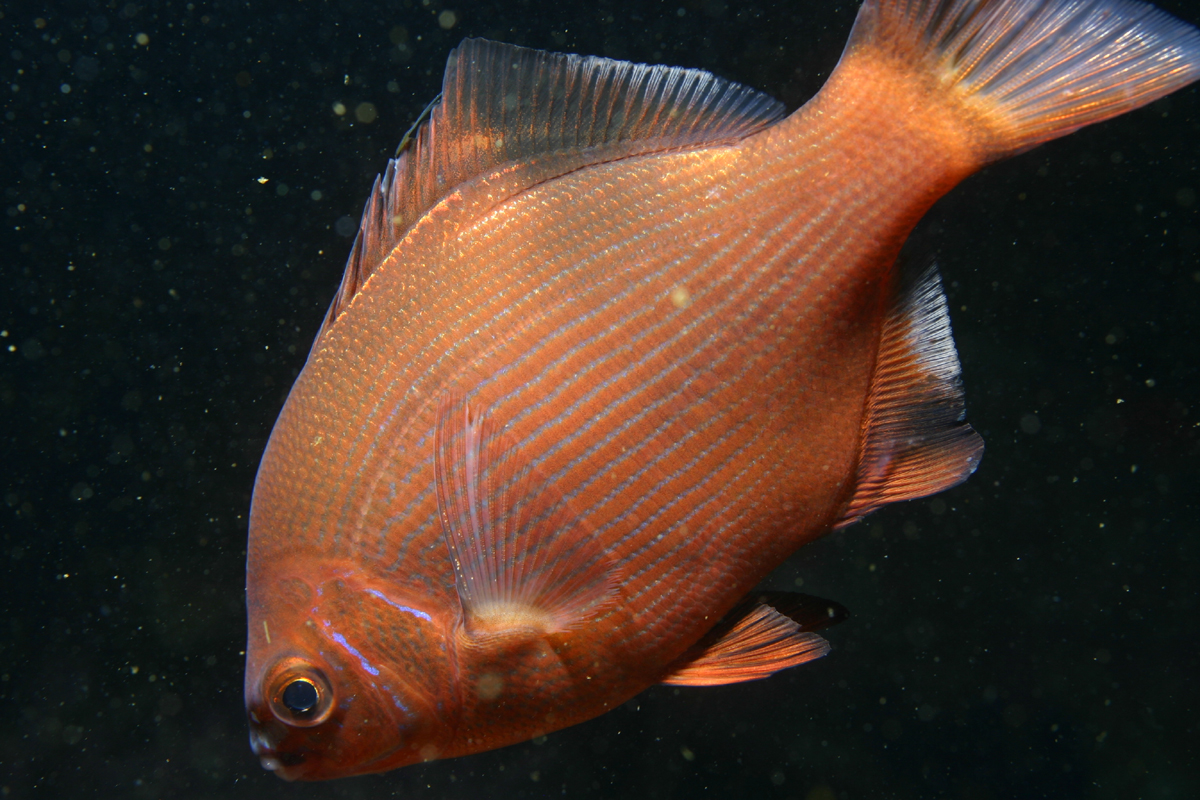
Striped seaperch

==== Family Embiotocidae (Surfperches) ====
- Genus Cymatogaster
  - Cymatogaster aggregata (Shiner Perch)
- Genus Embiotoca
  - Embiotoca lateralis (Striped Seaperch)
- Genus Phanerodon
  - Phanerodon furcatus (White Seaperch)
- Genus Rhacochilus
  - Rhacochilus vacca (Pile Perch)

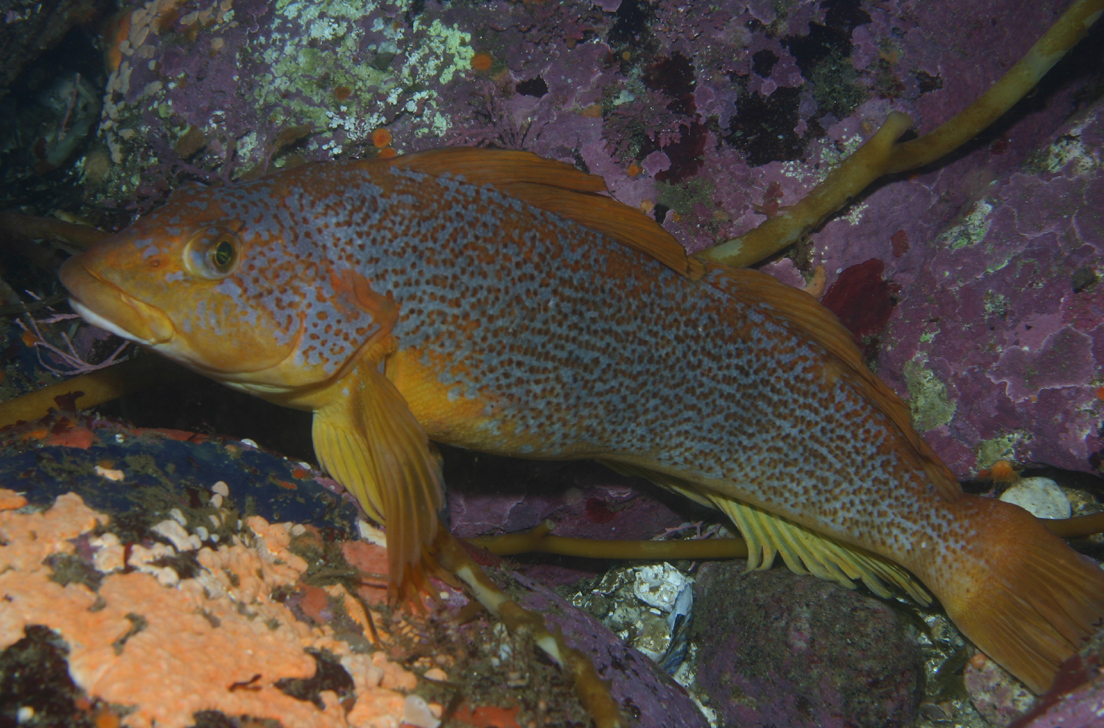
kelp greenling

==== Family Percopsidae (Trout-Perch) ====
- Genus Percopsis
  - Percopsis omiscomaycus (Trout-Perch)

==== Family Anoplopomatidae (Sablefishes) ====
- Genus Anoplopoma
  - Anoplopoma fimbria (Sablefish)

==== Family Hexagrammidae (Greenlings) ====
- Genus Hexagrammos
  - Hexagrammos decagrammus (Kelp Greenling)
  - Hexagrammos lagocephalus (Rock Greenling)
- Genus Ophiodon
  - Ophiodon elongatus (Lingcod)

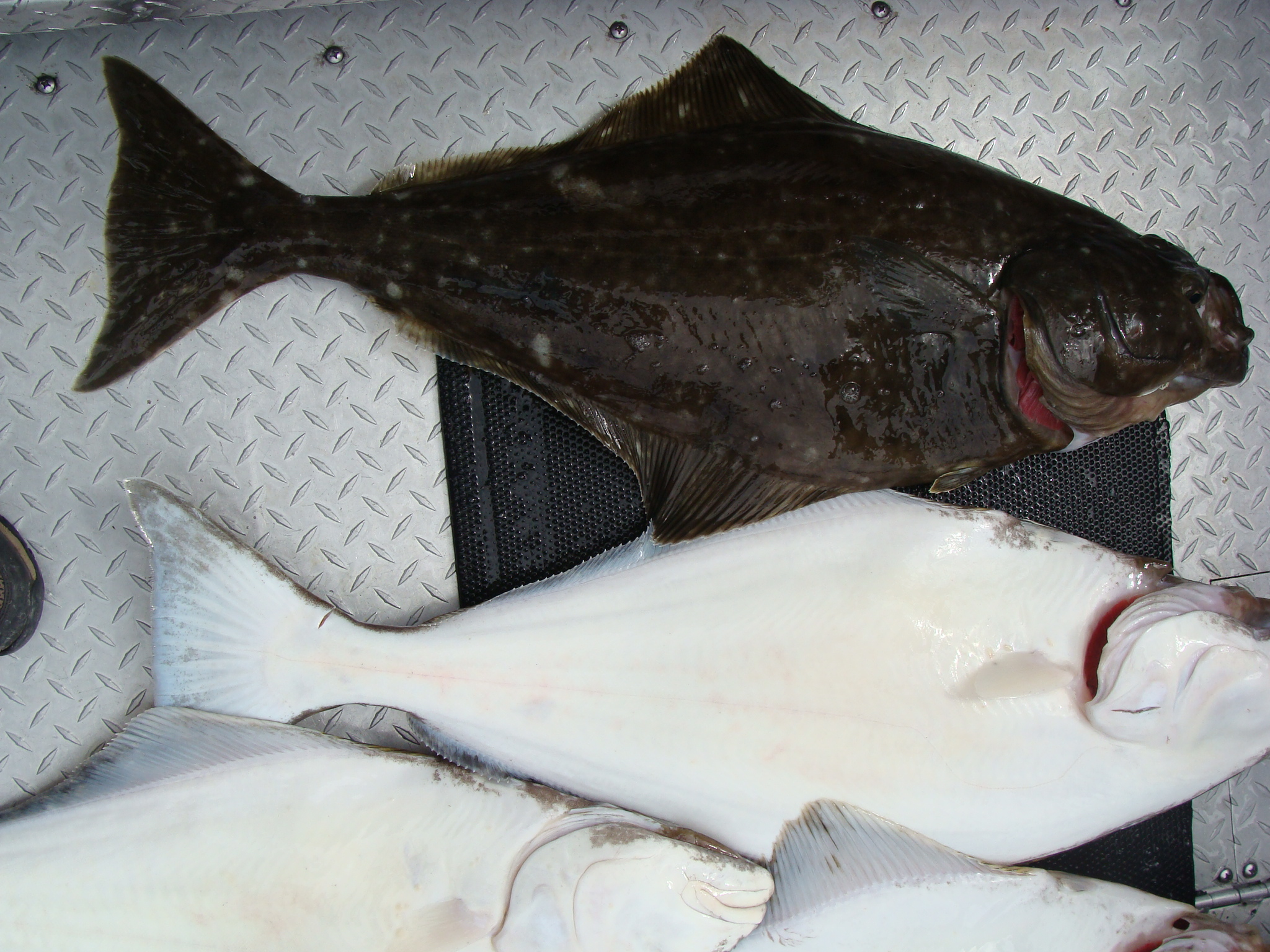
Pacific halibut

==== Family Pleuronectidae (Righteye Flounders) ====
- Genus Eopsetta
  - Eopsetta jordani (Petrale Sole)
- Genus Hippoglossus
  - Hippoglossus stenolepis (Pacific Halibut)
- Genus Lepidopsetta
  - Lepidopsetta bilineata (Rock Sole)
- Genus Platichthys
  - Platichthys stellatus (Starry Flounder)
- Genus Pleuronichthys
  - Pleuronichthys coenosus (C-O Sole)
- Genus Microstomus
  - Microstomus pacificus (Dover Sole)

==== Family Cynoglossidae (Tonguefishes) ====
- Genus Symphurus
  - Symphurus atricaudus (California Tonguefish)

== Introduced Species ==
The following is a list of notable fish species that have been introduced to Washington state and have established self-sustaining populations.

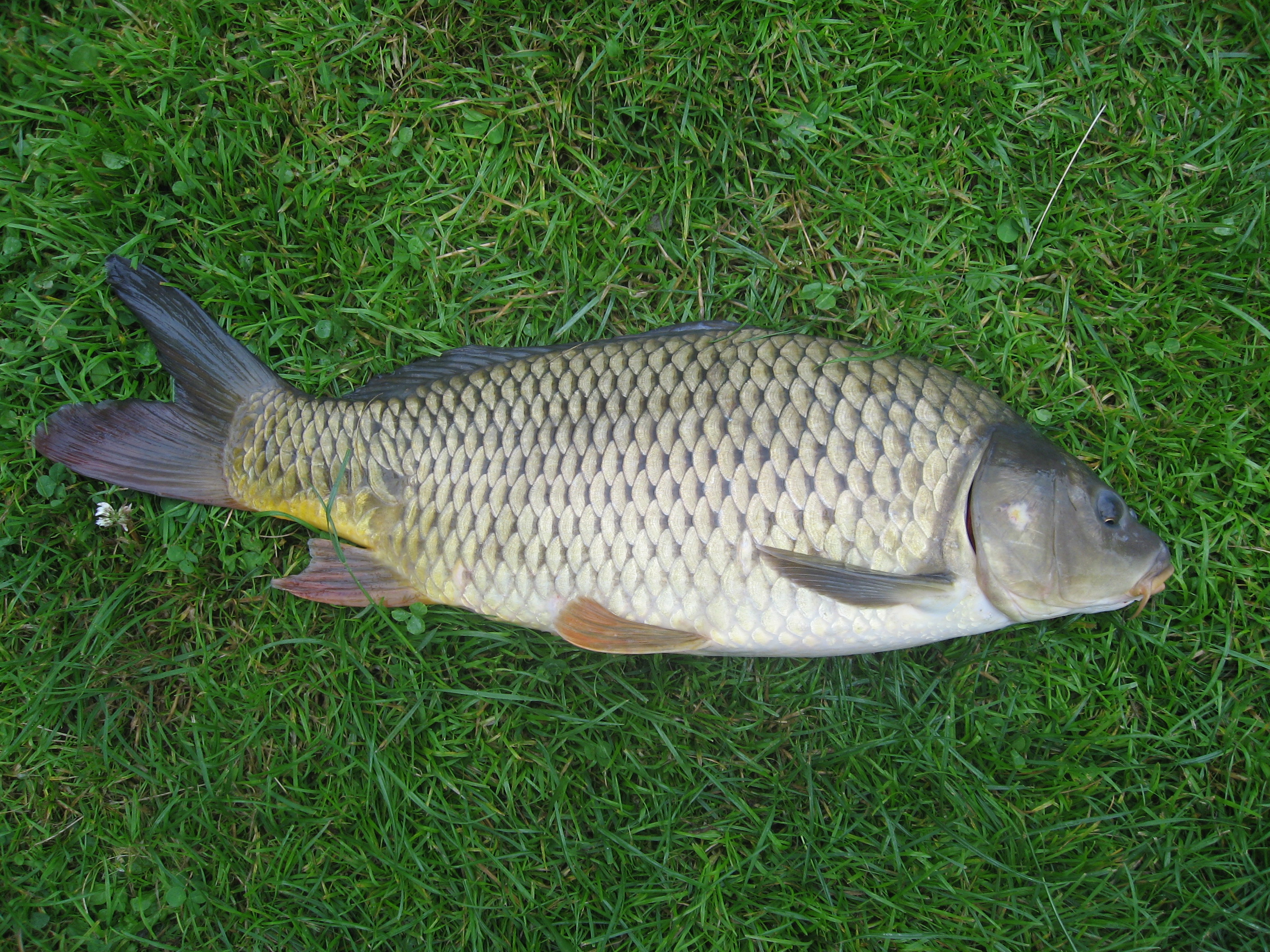
Common Carp

=== Family Cyprinidae (Carps and Minnows) ===
- Genus Cyprinus
  - Cyprinus carpio (Common Carp)
- Genus Ctenopharyngodon
  - Ctenopharyngodon idella (Grass Carp) — Sterile populations introduced for vegetation control
- Genus Hypophthalmichthys
  - Hypophthalmichthys molitrix (Silver Carp)
  - Hypophthalmichthys nobilis (Bighead Carp)

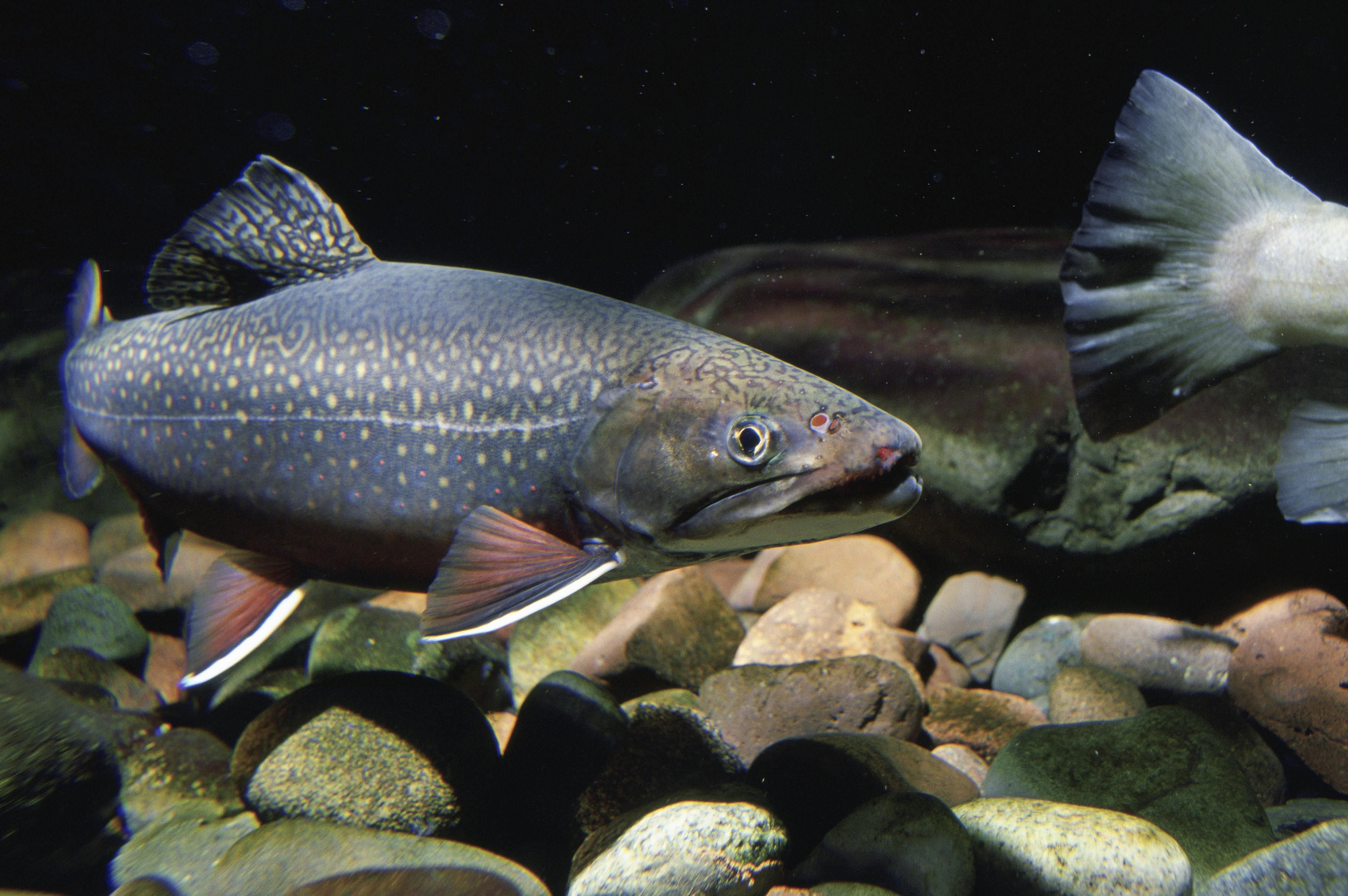
Brook trout

=== Family Salmonidae (Salmon, Trout, Chars, and Whitefish) ===
- Genus Salmo
  - Salmo trutta (Brown Trout)
  - Salvelinus fontinalis (Brook Trout)
- Genus Oncorhynchus
  - Oncorhynchus aguabonita (Golden Trout) — Stocked in high alpine lakes
- Genus Prosopium
  - Prosopium williamsoni (Mountain Whitefish) — Native to parts of WA, introduced to others

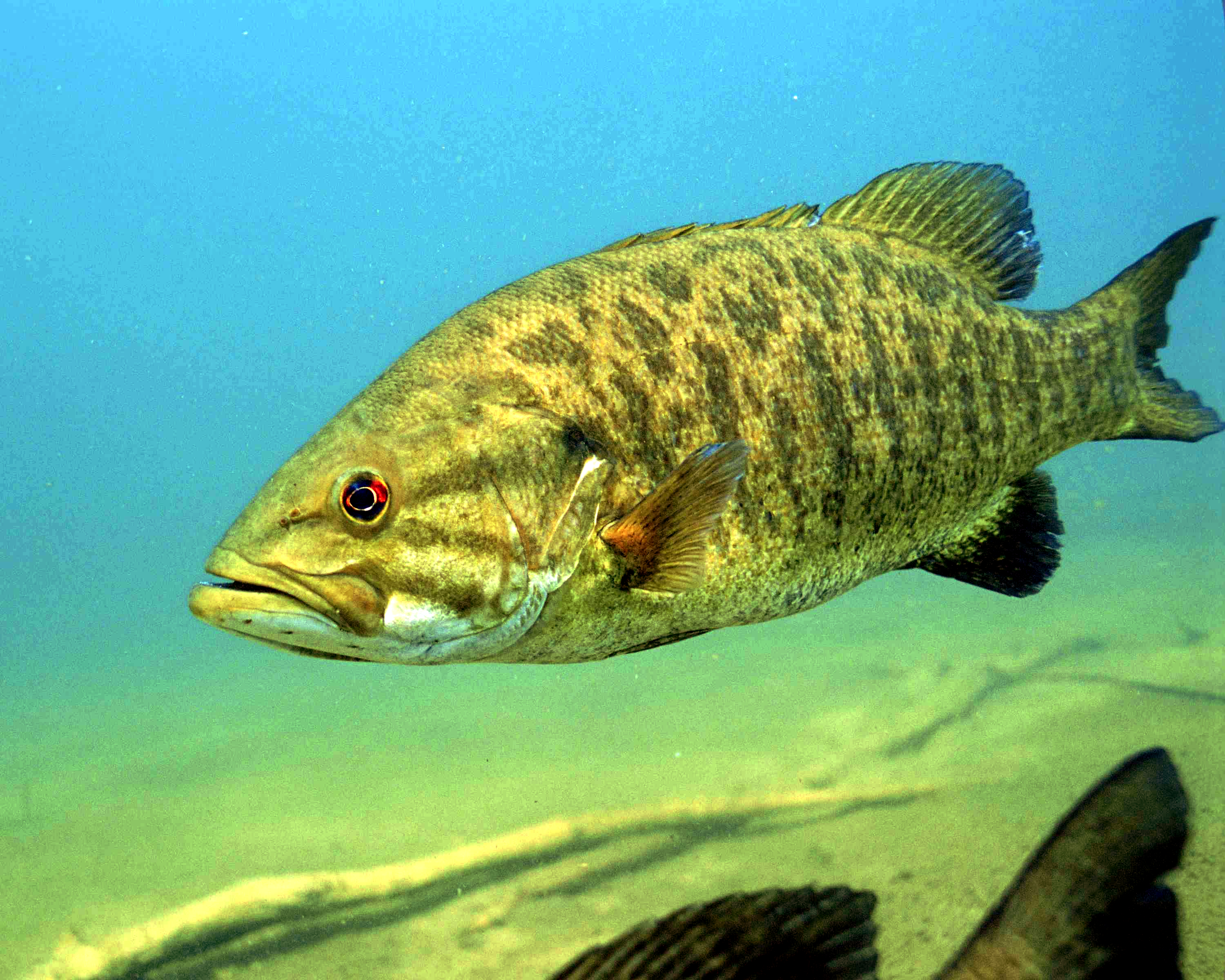
Smallmouth bass

=== Family Centrarchidae (Sunfishes) ===
- Genus Lepomis
  - Lepomis gibbosus (Pumpkinseed)
  - Lepomis macrochirus (Bluegill)
  - Lepomis microlophus (Redear Sunfish)
- Genus Micropterus
  - Micropterus dolomieu (Smallmouth Bass)
  - Micropterus salmoides (Largemouth Bass)
- Genus Pomoxis
  - Pomoxis annularis (White Crappie)
  - Pomoxis nigromaculatus (Black Crappie)

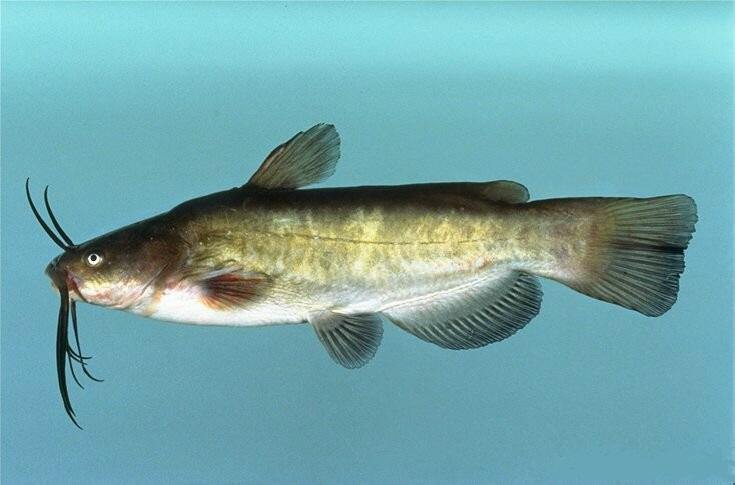
Brown Bullhead

=== Family Ictaluridae (North American Catfishes) ===
- Genus Ictalurus
  - Ictalurus punctatus (Channel Catfish)
- Genus Ameiurus
  - Ameiurus melas (Black Bullhead)
  - Ameiurus natalis (Yellow Bullhead)

=== Family Esocidae (Pikes) ===
- Genus Esox
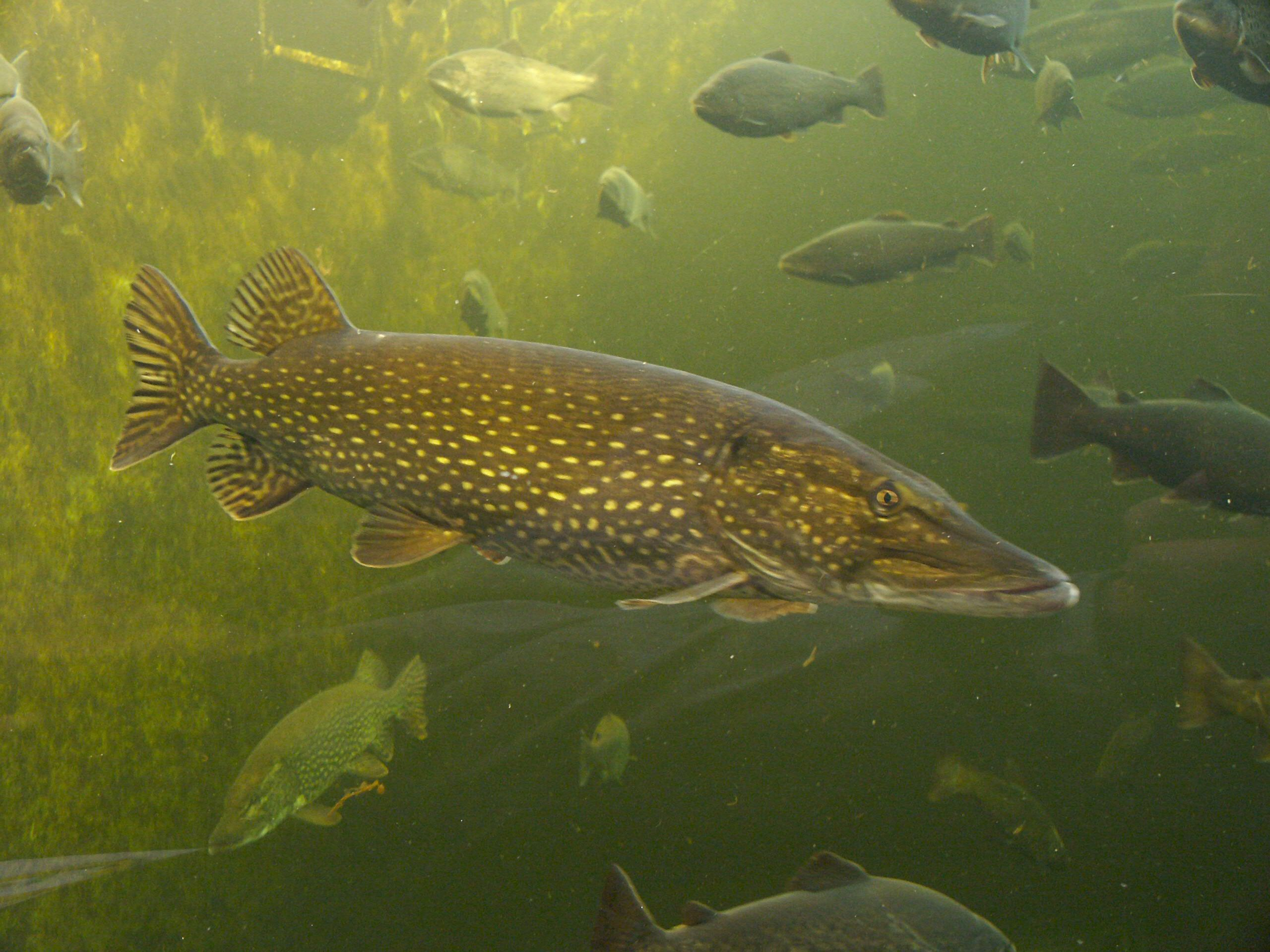
  - Northern pike
    Esox lucius (Northern Pike) — Illegally introduced, invasive

=== Family Percidae (Perches) ===
- Genus Perca
  - Perca flavescens (Yellow Perch)
- Genus Sander
  - Sander vitreus (Walleye)

=== Family Moronidae (Temperate Basses) ===
- Genus Morone
  - Morone chrysops (White Bass) — Introduced in some impoundments
