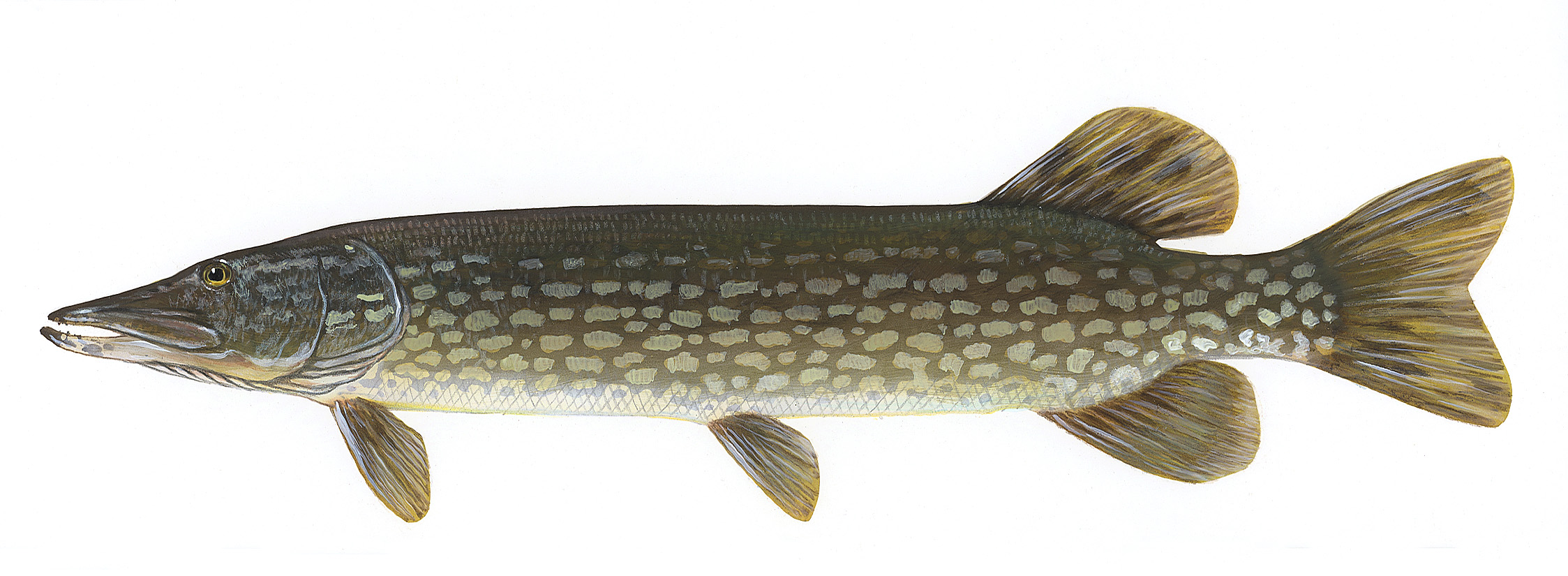
- Northern pike (Esox lucius)

Scientific classification
- Kingdom: Animalia
- Phylum: Chordata
- Class: Actinopterygii
- Division: Teleostei
- Order: Salmoniformes
- Suborder: Esocoidei; Bleeker, 1859

Type species
- Esox lucius Linnaeus, 1758

Families
- Esocidae G. Cuvier, 1817; Umbridae Bonaparte, 1845

Synonyms
- Esociformes Bleeker, 1859; Haplomi; Esocae; Umbriformes Günther, 1866

= Esocoidei =

Esocoidei Temporal range: Campanian–present

Order of ray-finned fishes

The Esocoidei (/ˈiːsɒsɪfɔːrmiːz/) is a small suborder of freshwater ray-finned fish, one of two suborders in the order Salmoniformes. It contains two families, Umbridae and Esocidae. The pikes of genus Esox give the suborder its name.

This suborder is closely related to the Salmonoidei, the two comprising the order Salmoniformes. The esociform fishes first appeared in the late Cretaceous — early products of the Euteleostei radiation of that time. They diverged from their sister group Salmoniformes about 110 million years ago, with the extant species having evolved from a common ancestor that lived about 90 million years ago. Today, they are found in weed-choked freshwater habitats in North America and northern Eurasia.

== Taxonomy ==
In the past, they were often placed in the order Salmoniformes as the suborder Esocoidei. During the early 21st century, due to their morphological divergence from Salmoniformes, they were instead treated as their own order, Esociformes. However, as phylogenetic studies have increasingly affirmed the relationship of Salmoniformes and Esociformes, more recent taxonomic authorities have revived the old classification of placing esocoids as a suborder of the Salmoniformes.

The following families are placed in this group:

- Suborder Esocoidei
  - Family Esocidae Rafinesque, 1815 - pikes
    - Subfamily Dalliinae Jordan, 1885 - blackfishes
    - Subfamily Esocinae Rafinesque, 1815 - pikes
  - Family Umbridae Bonaparte, 1845 - mudminnows

Several esocid genera are known from the Late Cretaceous of North America, including †Estesesox Wilson, Brinkman & Neuman, 1992, †Oldmanesox Wilson, Brinkman & Neuman, 1992, †Archaeosiilik Brinkman et al., 2025 & †Nunikuluk Brinkman et al., 2025. Their presence makes esocids one of the few North American freshwater teleost groups to have diversified prior to the Cretaceous-Paleogene extinction event.

The three extant esocid genera (Esox, Novumbra, and Dallia) together comprise a holarctic distribution. Two additional genera have been described from fossils dating to the Cretaceous of North America. Umbra remains the only extant genus in the family Umbridae, and can be found in eastern North America and Europe. Three additional genera have been described from fossils dating from the Paleocene of Europe; however, genetic studies on the extant species of Umbra have recovered a split between the North American and European species dating to the Late Cretaceous and earliest half of the Paleogene.

=== Relationships ===
While the family Esocidae traditionally only contained the genus Esox, recent genetic and paleontological research have recovered Novumbra and Dallia as members of the family Esocidae, being closer related to Esox than Umbra. Umbra is the only remaining extant species in Umbridae. Various fossils have been described as members of Esociformes and are placed on the following tree accordingly.

- Esocoidei
  - †Oldmanesox
  - †Estesesox
  - Esocidae
    - - - - Esox
        - Novumbra
      - Dallia
  - Umbridae
    - †Boltyshia
    - - †Palaeoesox
      - - †Proumbra
        - - Umbra
