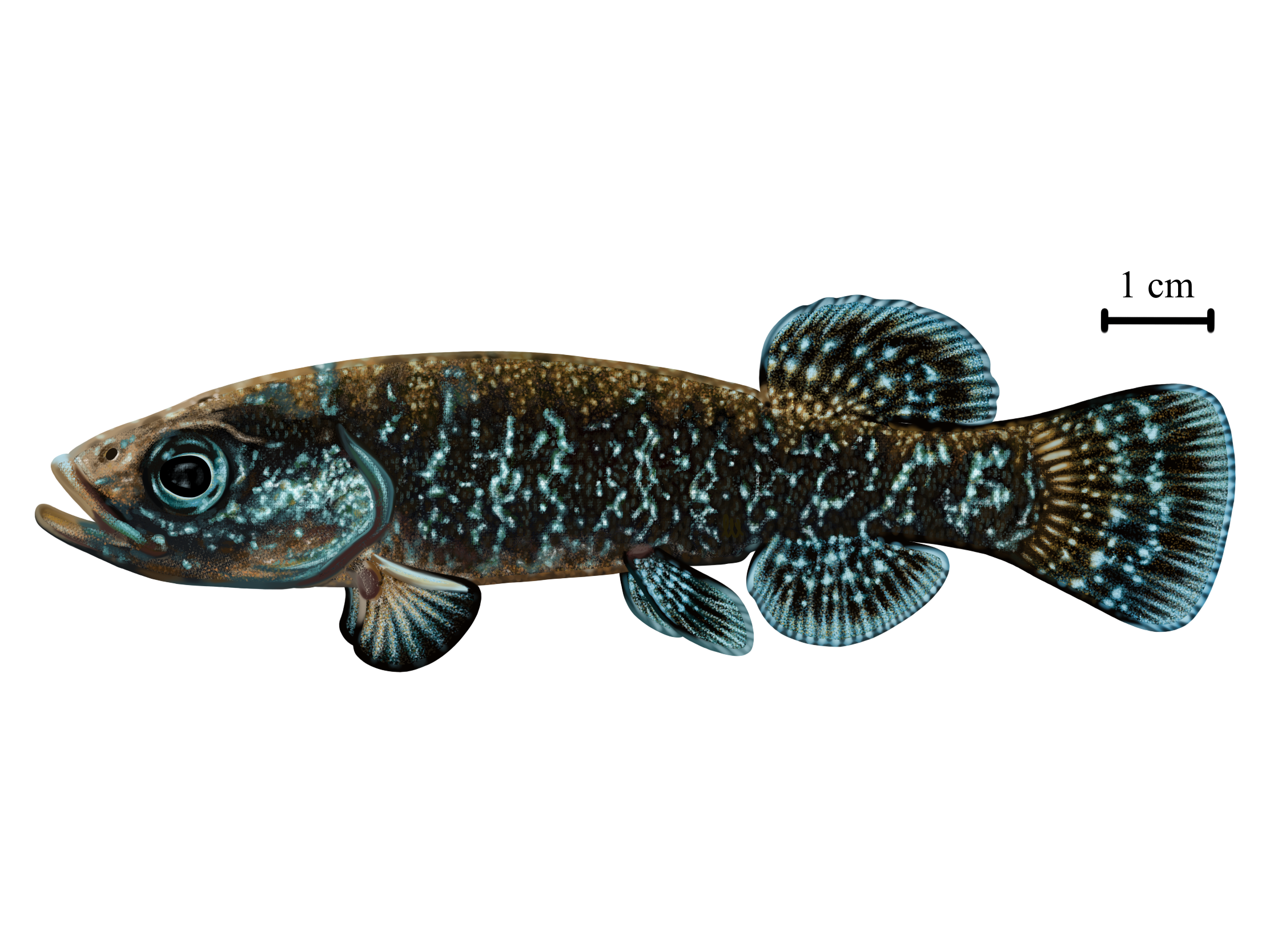
- Reconstruction of Novumbra oregonensis

Scientific classification
- Domain: Eukaryota
- Kingdom: Animalia
- Phylum: Chordata
- Class: Actinopterygii
- Order: Esociformes
- Family: Umbridae
- Genus: Novumbra
- Species: †N. oregonensis

Binomial name
- †Novumbra oregonensis Cavender, 1969

= Novumbra oregonensis =

Novumbra oregonensis Temporal range: Oligocene, 31.1 Ma

Extinct species of fish

Novumbra oregonensis is an extinct species of mudminnow from Oregon, USA. All fossils have been found in the lower member of the John Day Formation; the type specimens were found in the Knox Ranch leaf locality, and additional paratypes were found in the Bridge Creek flora locality. Similar to other mudminnows, its habitat would have been heavily vegetated waters, based on the presence of leaf imprints accompanying the fossils.

Novumbra oregonensis differs from the only other member of the genus, the Olympic mudminnow, by a larger head (the skull of the former goes into the standard length 3 times, while the latter's head goes into the standard length 3.5 times), and a significantly longer lower jaw. The pelvic, anal, and presumably dorsal fins are positioned more posteriorly on the body, and the standard length was slightly larger at 90 mm.
