= Nunikuluk =

Nunikuluk Temporal range: Late Cretaceous, Campanian

Scientific classification
- Kingdom: Animalia
- Phylum: Chordata
- Class: Actinopterygii
- Order: Salmoniformes
- Family: Esocidae
- Genus: †Nunikuluk; Murray, Brinkman, et al., 2025
- Species: †N. gracilis

Binomial name
- †Nunikuluk gracilis Murray, Brinkman, et al., 2025

Extinct genus of pike

Nunikuluk is an extinct genus of esocid fish from the Late Cretaceous (Campanian) of North America. It contains a single species, Nunikuluk gracilis.

== Taxonomy and discovery ==
The genus and its type species, Nunikuluk gracilis, were described by Murray, Brinkman, and colleagues in 2025. The holotype was collected from the Campanian-age deposits of the Prince Creek Formation in Alaska.
