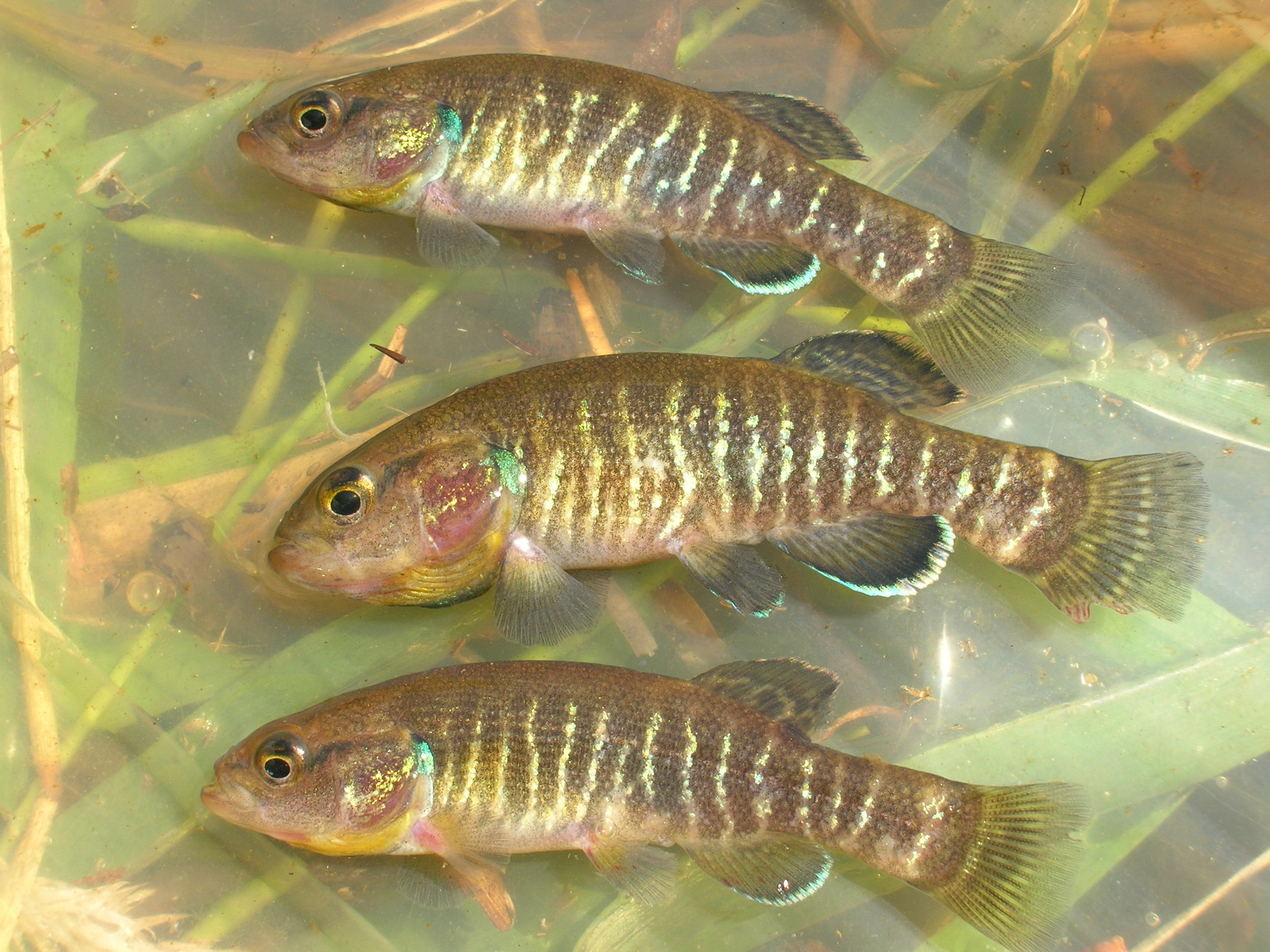
- Novumbra hubbsi

Scientific classification
- Kingdom: Animalia
- Phylum: Chordata
- Class: Actinopterygii
- Division: Teleostei
- Order: Salmoniformes
- Family: Esocidae
- Subfamily: Esocinae
- Genus: Novumbra; L. P. Schultz, 1929

= Novumbra =

Novumbra Temporal range: Early Oligocene–present

Genus of fishes

Novumbra is a genus of mudminnows native to Oregon and Washington state, USA. Although traditionally classified in family Umbridae, molecular data suggests that this genus is more closely related to Esox than Dallia and Umbra. Novumbra diverged from Esox roughly 65 million years ago in the Paleocene.

== Species ==
Two species in this genus are recognized:

- Novumbra hubbsi L. P. Schultz, 1929 (Olympic mudminnow)
- †Novumbra oregonensis Cavender, 1969
