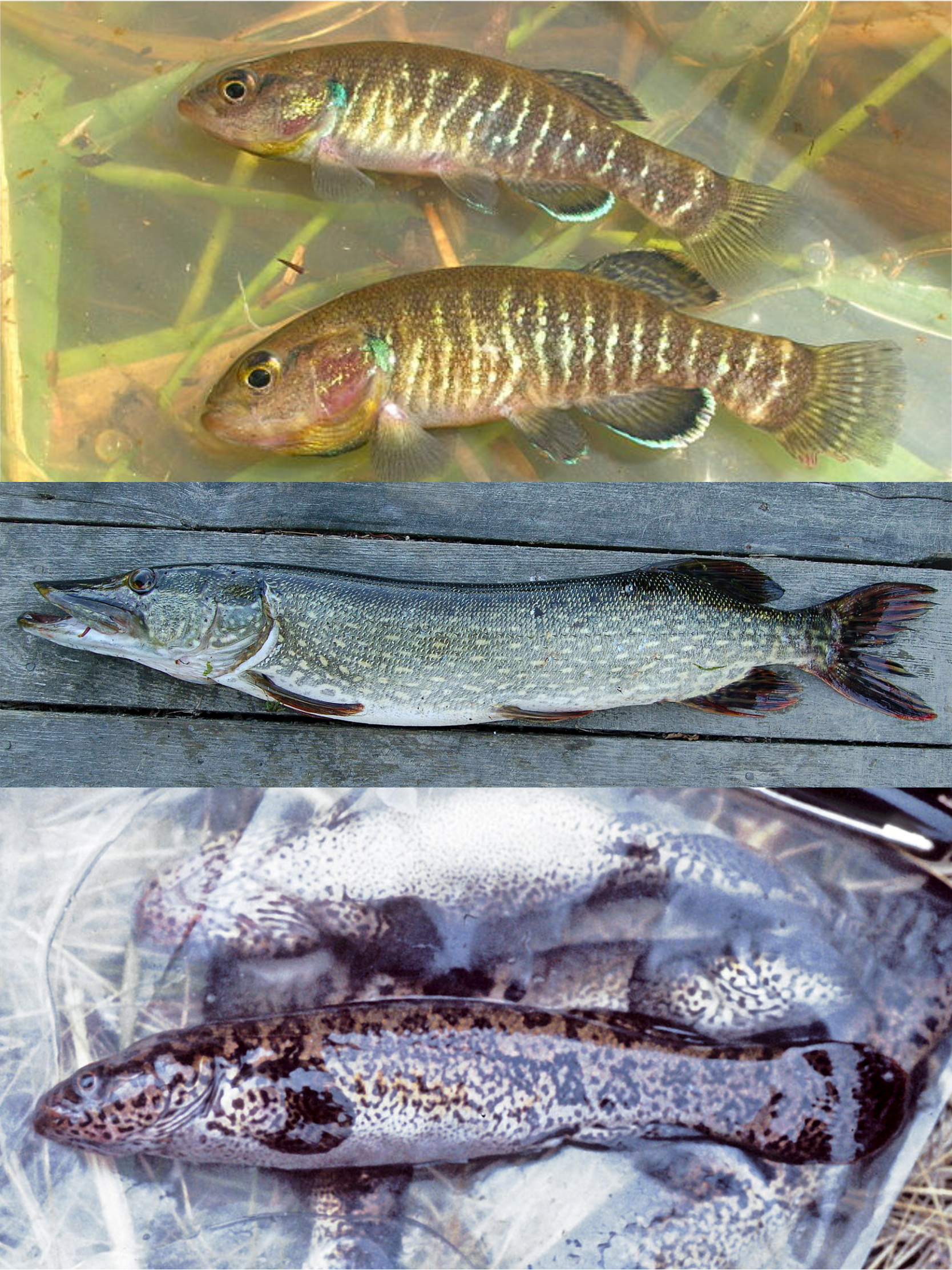

Scientific classification
- Kingdom: Animalia
- Phylum: Chordata
- Class: Actinopterygii
- Order: Salmoniformes
- Suborder: Esocoidei
- Family: Esocidae; G. Cuvier, 1817

Genera
- Esox Linnaeus, 1758; Dallia Bean, 1880; Novumbra Schultz, 1929; †Estesesox Wilson et al., 1992; †Oldmanesox Wilson et al., 1992; †Archaeosiilik Brinkman et al., 2025; †Nunikuluk Brinkman et al., 2025

= Esocidae =

Esocidae Temporal range: Campanian to present

Family of ray-finned fishes

Esocidae is a family of ray-finned fish in the order Salmoniformes, which contains pike, pickerel, and mudminnows. While the family traditionally only contained the genus Esox, recent genetic and paleontological research have recovered Novumbra and Dallia as members of the family Esocidae, being closer related to Esox than Umbra. Fossil specimens from the Mesozoic in North America have been assigned as two additional genera in this family, although they may actually be more basal.

== Taxonomy ==
The family is classified as follows:

- Family Esocidae
  - Subfamily Dalliinae Jordan, 1885
    - Genus Dallia Bean, 1880
  - Subfamily Esocinae Rafinesque, 1815
    - Genus Esox Linnaeus, 1758
    - Genus Novumbra Schultz, 1929

=== Classification ===
Esox is the youngest genus, with Dallia and Novumbra branching off further up the line. The cladogram below has been found by López et al., with the two additional fossil genera included at the base of the tree.

- Esociformes
  - Umbridae
  - Esocidae
    - †Oldmanesox
    - †Estesesox
    - - Dallia
      - - Novumbra
        - - Esox

The fossil genera Estesesox and Oldmanesox have been recovered in North America. Estesesox fossils have been described from the Lance, Hell Creek, Oldman, Foremost, and Milk River Formations. Oldmanesox fossils have been described from the Oldman Formation. In 2025, two more fossil esocid genera were described from the Prince Creek Formation of Alaska: Archaeosiilik and Nunikuluk.

Due to the fragmentary nature of Oldmanesox and Estesesox, little information on the exact relationships between the two genera and the rest of the species in the family has been published. More recent genetic studies which place Dallia and Novumbra in Esocidae may influence future studies on placement of Estesesox and Oldmanesox within the Esocidae and/or Esociformes family trees.

== Distribution ==
Esocidae has a holarctic distribution. Species in the genus Esox can be found in Eurasia and North America, while Dallia has a more restricted range in Alaska and eastern Siberia. Of extant esocids, Novumbra has the most restricted range of all, being found only on the Olympic Peninsula in Washington state.

== Behavior ==
Despite differing size and mouth shape, all extant species of esocids are sight-based ambush predators, taking any animal they can fit in their mouth. Both pike and blackfishes display cannibalistic tendencies. While the Olympic mudminnow is aggressively territorial to fish of the same size during the spawning season, it will generally leave its fry alone.
