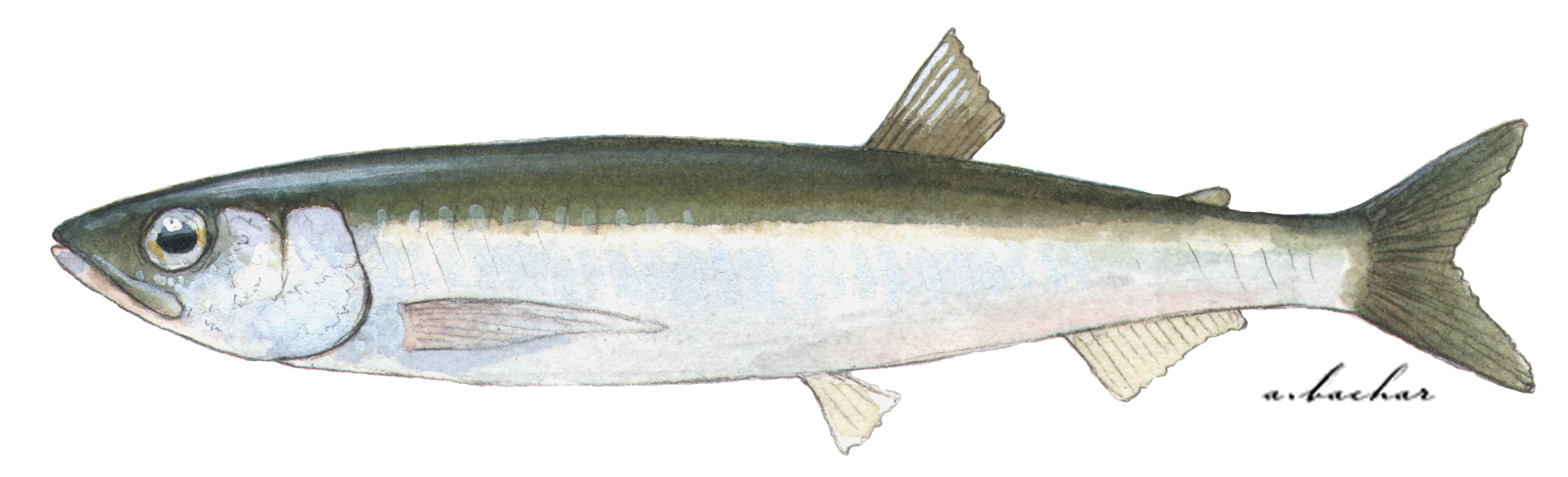

Scientific classification
- Kingdom: Animalia
- Phylum: Chordata
- Class: Actinopterygii
- Division: Teleostei
- Order: Osmeriformes
- Family: Osmeridae
- Genus: Spirinchus
- Species: S. starksi

Binomial name
- Spirinchus starksi (Fisk, 1913)

= Night smelt =

Species of ray-finned fish

The Night smelt (Spirinchus starksi) is a true smelt of the northern family Osmeridae and part of the larger order Osmeriformes. The family of the true smelt consists of 12 species; 7 of which are native to California's estuary and coastal waters. The night smelt is one of the three extant (still existing) species in the Spirinchus genus, along with the Longfin Smelt (Spirinchus thaleichthys) and the shishamo (Spirinchus lanceolatus), native to northern Japan.

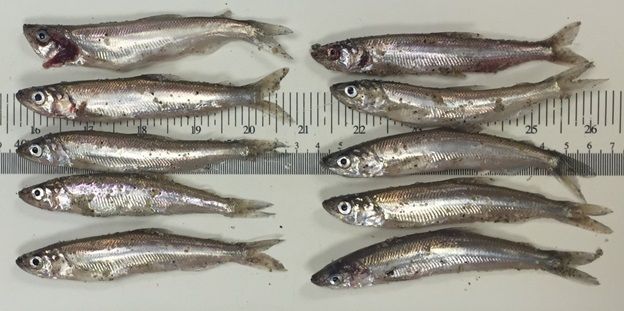
Night smelt caught and displayed

It is native to the Pacific coast of North America ranging from Point Arguello, California, northward to Shelikof Bay, southeast Alaska. They spawn nocturnally over coarse sand beaches in the surf zone, from Point Arguello in central California to southeast Alaska. Little is known about the night smelt because it is considered an enigmatic species, and has not been heavily studied.

== Physical characteristics ==
The night smelt are small, pelagic marine fish. They are bright golden to silvery in color and give off the distinctive odor of cucumber commonly found in other smelt species. The cucumber odor is caused by trans-2-cis-6- nonadienal and the smell's origin is uncertain. Previous studies have concluded it either results from bioaccumulation of the chemical from algal origins endogenous metabolite originating in the fish. They are laterally compressed, fusiform fish with cycloid scales. They have a soft-rayed dorsal fin, a forked caudal fin, and a bottom jaw that protrudes to the upper jaw when compressed. As a member of the smelt family, they possess a small adipose fin on their dorsal side, which is a distinguishing feature. They can be further distinguished from other osmerids because they do not have striations on the gill cover which is unique to eulachon. Wakasagi, surf, and delta smelt maxillaries do not extend beyond the middle or edge of the eye. On average they grow to 130 millimeters (<6 inches) with a maximum length of 9 inches. The night smelt are similar in appearance to the longfin smelt (Sprinchus thaleichthys). Additionally, due to overlapping habitats, night smelt are frequently caught alongside surf smelt due to their similar appearance. Night smelt are not to be confused with the California grunion (Leuresthes tenuis), an unrelated silverside that also spawns in the surf at night.

== Distribution ==
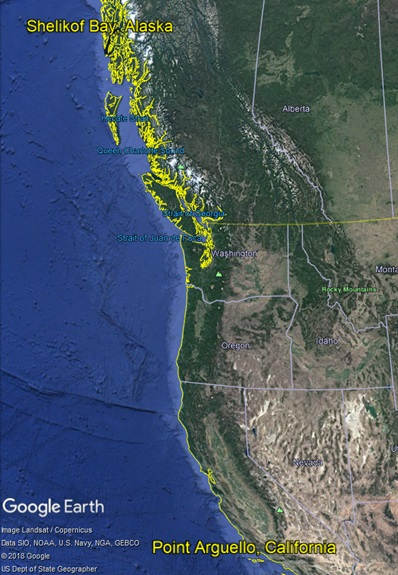
Night Smelt Range

Night smelt are found across the west coast of North America, spanning from the Shelikof Bay of Alaska to Point Arguello in central California. They span over 2736 kilometers along the coastline. A handful of published literature documented night smelt occurrences across North America's west coast, particularly north of Oregon. Two records of night smelt have also been recorded in Southeast Alaska off Sitka and Shelikof Bay. A single specimen was collected in Discovery Bay, Washington, on the eastern end of the Strait of Juan de Fuca. This discovery constituted a new record for this species in the Salish Sea, as it was the first of its species found in this body of water. Additionally, specimens have been found farther west and south in the Strait of Juan de Fuca, Hecate Strait, and the Queen Charlotte Islands. While the night smelt may be rare in the Salish Sea and present only in the Strait of Juan de Fuca, its presence in Discovery Bay raises the possibility that it might be more widespread in isolated locations in the Strait of Georgia. In the continental U.S., the night smelt is most commonly found from La Push, Washington to central California.

== Reproduction ==
Night smelt spawn along sandy open coasts and coarse sandy beaches often in proximity to river or creek mouths in north-central to northern California. However, little is known about the movement of night smelt in California. They spawn nocturnally in coarser sand grain sizes and spawning generally occurs from January to September. They spawn at high tides and are not found in the intertidal zones. Due to spawning in such shallow water, the eggs frequently become tidally emerged during incubation. Because their eggs are adhesive and demersal, the substrate type and water velocity are important to egg development. Eggs are usually deposited in areas with low to moderate velocities. Once released, the eggs adhere to coarse grains where they incubate for around 2 weeks.

The average ratio of males to females is around 8:1 and increases to 100:1 during spawning runs, where the sexes segregate nearshore with males dominating school compositions. Little is known of night smelt growth. Outside research has shown that the development of adjacent smelt species, like the rainbow smelt (Osmerus mordax), is often very rapid in young but slows as adults approach their maximum size. However, due to the lack of research, this is only an assumption for night smelt growth patterns.

== Habitat ==
Night smelt have been noted to live in surface waters and swim to depths of up to 420 feet below the surface (128 meters). They are benthopelagic, meaning, they live near or on the bottom of the lakes. Adults have been noted to access the beach during outgoing tides with a slight tidal height difference between high and low tide. Very little is known about the night smelt habitat requirements between hatching on sandy beaches to their reappearance as spawning adults. It is unclear if night smelt have preferences for specific beach attributes. They have often appeared in research bottom trawls over sandy substrate off Eureka and on beaches with coarser sand.

== Ecology ==
Juvenile and adult night smelt fill a role in pelagic ecosystems. They provide forage to a range of middle to high-trophic-level predatory fish, birds, and mammals. Additionally, night smelt embryos are forage for surf fish such as jacksmelt and surfperch.

The diet of night smelt has yet to be well-studied. Slama (1994) collected night smelt specimens from Freshwater Beach, Humboldt County in 1992 and 1993 to report their stomach content. Food content consisted of Onuphidae (a family of polychaete worms), crustaceans composed of gammarid amphipods, mysids, Crangon spp, diastylid cumacea, larval smelt, and fish embryos. Slama also noted crustaceans were consumed in higher frequencies by males and a higher proportion of onuphids were eaten by females.

All species of smelt, including the night smelt, form shoals as larvae and adults. The schools are predominantly male-dominated. The night smelt have seasonal movement patterns associated with foraging.

== Commercial ==
There is a minor commercial fishery for night smelt over much of its range but night smelt catch is often sold as "whitebait" or "smelt" in local markets.However, commercially, the night smelt is sold for human consumption and sold for consumption by fish, birds, and mammals. Historically, night smelt has been fished on sandy beaches along the coast of California and Oregon to Moss Landing in Monterey Bay. Eureka and Crescent City have been the primary ports of landing since 1980 and over 95% of commercial night smelt landings occur in Humboldt.

There are no estimates of commercial fishing efforts for the night smelt fishery other than the number of commercial fishermen submitting fish tickets annually. These values are hard to monitor as vessels are not used, fishing logs are not required, and fishing occurs in the dark.

== Recreation ==
Recreationally, night smelt are caught in the surf zone by dip net, A-frame net or (rarely) by hook and line. Some recreational fisheries involve cast nets or fish rakes. Night smelt are occasionally caught for bait, but their small size gives them little commercial importance overall.

== Cultural Significance ==
For hundreds of years, this species has been fished for subsistence and cultural purposes for the indigenous tribes of Humboldt and Del Norte counties. They have been fishing for this species using baskets and a-frame nets to catch the spawning fish individuals along the shore and their eggs. In recent decades, night smelt has been actively chosen to replace the lhvsmr population, who have been drastically reduced, for dietary needs. As such, this fish has transitioned into being a tribally important species.

== Conservation status ==
Environmental conditions play a critical role in the reproductive patterns and distribution of marine organisms and, consequently, the fisheries that they support. The potential of spawning habitat losses due to sea level rise could pose a major threat to the survival of night smelt populations. As a result, there could experience a rapid decline in population size. Historically, beaches that were fished for night smelt in California have been greatly reduced in width with extensive erosion of adjacent cliffs. The impact of these changes on the population dynamics of night smelt are currently unknown.

Outside of the fishing industry, there are no estimates of abundance for night smelt. Recent data from fishery sources suggest improvement in night smelt abundance indices. They have medium to high spawning potential rates, however, they may not recover as quickly following periods of low abundance. Other forage species have collapsed under fishing pressure exacerbated by unfavorable environmental conditions, however, night smelt is not immediately threatened by the fishing industry. It is often caught as a bycatch with other smelt species, but that is a small threat to population dynamics.
