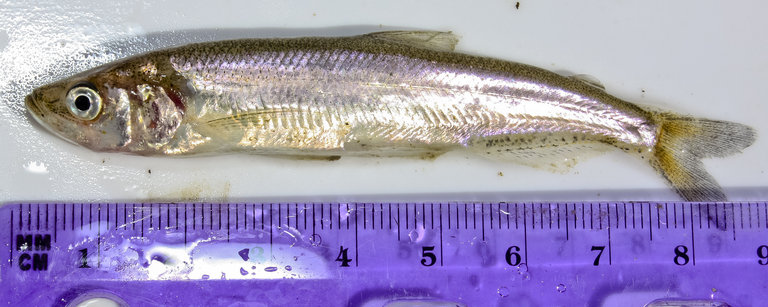
- Spirinchus thaleichthys

Scientific classification
- Kingdom: Animalia
- Phylum: Chordata
- Class: Actinopterygii
- Division: Teleostei
- Order: Osmeriformes
- Family: Osmeridae
- Genus: Spirinchus; D. S. Jordan & Evermann, 1896

Species
- See text.

= Spirinchus =

Spirinchus Temporal range: Miocene to Present

Genus of fishes

Spirinchus is a genus of smelts (Osmeridae) from the North Pacific Ocean and adjacent streams.

== Species ==
There are currently three recognized species in this genus:

- †Spirinchus izumoensis (Hamada, 2026)
- Spirinchus lanceolatus (Hikita, 1913) (Shishamo smelt, shishamo)
- Spirinchus starksi (Fisk, 1913) (Night smelt)
- Spirinchus thaleichthys (Ayres, 1860) (Longfin smelt)
