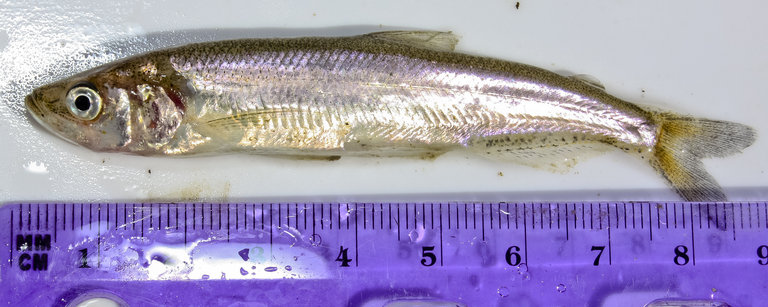

Conservation status
- Least Concern (IUCN 3.1)

Scientific classification
- Kingdom: Animalia
- Phylum: Chordata
- Class: Actinopterygii
- Order: Osmeriformes
- Family: Osmeridae
- Genus: Spirinchus
- Species: S. thaleichthys

Binomial name
- Spirinchus thaleichthys (Ayres, 1860)

= Longfin smelt =

Species of fish

The longfin smelt (Spirinchus thaleichthys) is a small anadromous fish native to the North Pacific, and adjacent streams and lakes. Its name is derived from its long pectoral fins, which extend almost to the base of its pelvic fins.

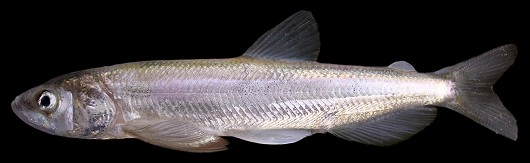
Photo: Rene Reyes, Tracy Fish Collection Facility, March 7 2008, US Bureau of Reclamation

== Taxonomy ==
S. thaleichthys is one of just three species in the genus Spirinchus, which are smelt native to the North Pacific Ocean. This genus is a part of the family Osmeridae, which is referred to as "true smelts". The name "thaleichthys" is derived from a smelt of the same family, Thaleichthys pacificus, whose name is derived from Greek, and means "rich fish". This is in reference to T. pacificus’ high fat content.

== Description ==
S. thaleichthys is characterized by its small size, not exceeding 20 centimeters in total length. It has a laterally compressed fusiform body, which means it is somewhat elongated and streamlined, and if viewed from above would be relatively thin. It is generally silver-white on the sides and ventral surface, with slightly darker coloration on the dorsal surface, ranging from olive-green/brown to pinkish. It has cycloid scales, and its lateral line is incomplete, only reaching just below the dorsal fin. Fins are soft-rayed, with 8-10 rays in the dorsal fin and 15-19 rays in the anal fin.The caudal fin is forked and homocercal (the two forks of its tail are the same size). S. thaleichthys possess an adipose fin. Their lower jaw protrudes beyond their upper jaw when compressed, and the base of their jaw reaches below the middle of the eye. Teeth are present on their tongue and both jaws. Most notably, their pectoral fins reach nearly the base of their pelvic fins, inspiring their common name "Longfin Smelt." There are few visible morphological differences between males and females, but males often have a small bump that protrudes their anal fin, and their anal fin is generally more angular, whereas females have a more rounded anal fin. Additionally, males are generally slightly smaller than females, but have longer fins.

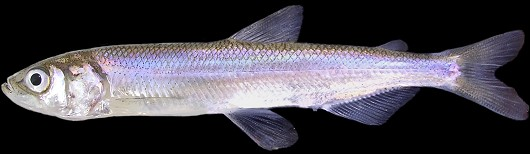
Photo: Rene Reyes, Tracy Fish Collection Facility, February 14 2008, US Bureau of Reclamation

== Distribution and habitat ==
S. thaleichthys is native to the Pacific coast of North America, its range stretching from the San Francisco Bay in California to the Gulf of Alaska. It is an anadromous species that spawns in coastal rivers but generally inhabits bays or estuaries. There are two known landlocked populations, one in Lake Washington (Seattle, WA, USA) and one in Harrison Lake (BC, Canada). While the Washington and California populations were once thought to be separate subspecies, more recent evaluation has shown that despite a lack of gene flow between populations, they are not significantly different and are therefore considered to be the same species. S. thaleichthys have a large salinity tolerance due to their habitat generally being estuaries or deltas in between salt and freshwater. They are able to inhabit marine, estuarine, or freshwater environments. They are open-water fish, inhabiting most of the range of the water column. They prefer shallow areas when they do inhabit marine environments, although that is also likely due to the necessity for proximity to an estuary or river system.

== Biology and behavior ==
S. thaleichthys is a shoaling species, occurring in large schooling groups. Their lifespan is generally 2 years, but some individuals can live an additional year. Their diet is somewhat consistent across their range, but changes slightly based on location. It also shifts as they age. Juveniles <1 year old feed on chironomids (midges), copepods, and cladocerans (water fleas), with copepods making up 85% of their diet in the first 6 months of life. In the Lake Washington population, juveniles have a more diverse diet in summer months leading into the fall, and their food source shifts as they grow, beginning to include more cladocerans, mysids, and chironomids. During autumn, when they reach an age of about 6 months, their diet switches to mainly mysids, composing 50-70% of the diet for the rest of their lives. This percentage was historically higher, but in the Lake Washington population human development allowed for higher egg retention, which in turn increased smelt population and lowered mysid population due to increased predation. During winter months, amphipods and cladocerans are still important food sources, while the summer diet becomes more diverse as in the juveniles. S. thaleichthys generally exhibit feeding behavior in response to the day-night cycle, remaining slightly deeper in the day to shelter from harsher sunlight, and ascending at night to feed. In the Lake Washington population this movement is analogous with that of the mysid shrimp which is a primary food source.

S. thaleichthys are prey to several fish species, depending on the population. In Lake Washington, they are preyed on by Northern Pikeminnows (Ptychocheilus oregonensis), Cutthroat Trout (Oncorhynchus clarkii), and Rainbow Trout (Oncorhynchus mykiss). In the California population, S. thaleichthys is preyed on by Striped Bass (Morone saxatilis), Sacramento Perch (Archoplites interruptus), Thicktail Chub (Gila crassicauda), and Steelhead (Oncorhynchus mykiss). Additionally, their larvae are preyed on by introduced Inland silversides (Menidia beryllina).

S. thaleichthys are sexually dimorphic, and many of their usually subtle morphological differences between sexes are pronounced during the spawning period. They have a large tolerance to differences in salinity, but they still require salinity between 2 and 18 ppt (parts per thousand). Larva require salinity between 0.4 and 10 ppt, and perform best between 5 and 10 ppt. Additionally, while S. thaleichthys can also tolerate a range of temperatures, their embryonic development requires temperatures between 10 and 12 °C to be fully successful. While temperatures as high as 15 °C can be tolerated, and likely temperatures lower than 10 °C, the ideal range is relatively small. These parameters are affected significantly by the amount of freshwater that flows into the delta, which informs S. thaleichthys population growth and survival.

== Life history ==
S. thaleichthys is an anadromous species, spending most of its life in estuaries, deltas, or marine environments but traveling up coastal rivers to spawn. They congregate in large groups at the mouth of their chosen river before traveling upstream. The migration is relatively short, generally only a few kilometers upstream, and as a result spawning can sometimes occur in somewhat brackish water. Males generally migrate before females, and outnumber them at the spawning site. Once the population reaches its spawning destination, spawning occurs among the entire group, strictly at night due to sunlight sensitivity and predator avoidance. S. thaleichthys are broadcast spawners, so they expel their eggs and sperm into the water column, where they mix and fertilize. This process takes place over sand, pebbles, or aquatic plants, and the fertilized eggs stick to the substrate. Typically, individuals die after spawning, but some females have been known to survive another year. S. thaleichthys have a long spawning period, generally ranging from October to June. The Lake Washington population spawns from January to April. In general, spawning occurs at water temperatures of 7-14.5 degrees celsius.

S. thaleichthys eggs are double membraned, and when the egg first contacts the water, the outer membrane ruptures, forming a stalk that it uses to attach to the substrate. The incubation period is about 40 days, but depends on water temperature. When hatched, larvae are 5-8 mm, and most of their growth occurs in the first 9 months of their life, at which point they are 60-75 mm in length. Larvae are rapidly moved by the currents back to the estuary or delta at the head of their spawning river after they hatch.

== Conservation status and controversy ==
S. thaleichthys is listed as "Least Concern" by the IUCN Red List, a comprehensive review of a species’ conservation status. This would indicate that they face few threats that could harm the population. However, this is more due to the species’ distribution and localization to several separate watersheds. S. thaleichthys are threatened by watershed destruction and diversion of freshwater, primarily for agriculture. While these threats exist, a threat to one population likely will not affect another, so the species as a whole is not threatened. However, individual populations of S. thaleichthys have been listed as endangered. Notably, the population inhabiting the San Francisco Bay-Delta was listed as Endangered by the U.S. Fish and Wildlife Service July 29, 2024, echoing a prior designation as threatened by California’s Endangered Species Act. This listing was in response to a significant decrease in S. thaleichthys population in the San Francisco Bay estuary since the 1980s. This designation would reallocate freshwater that was previously diverted for agriculture back to the habitat of S. thaleichthys. Before this change took effect, up to 65% of the water that would naturally flow into the San Francisco Estuary was diverted for human use. Additionally, several introduced species such as the Amur clam (Corbula amurensis) has lowered availability of food resources for native fish such as S. thaleichthys. However, this decision was challenged by U.S. House Representative Doug Lamalfa (R-CA) who claimed that the listing was "misguided" and "unscientific". This claim was disputed by scientists involved in the issue, who cited decades of research indicating that the population is in decline. Lamalfa introduced a resolution to repeal S. thaleichthys’ listing as Endangered, which subsequently passed the House of Representatives on May 1, 2025, in a 216-195 vote that fell along party lines. As of October 2025, the resolution has not passed the senate, so the ultimate outcome is undetermined. If it is passed, scientists warn that the resolution could lead to local extinction for S. thaleichthys.
