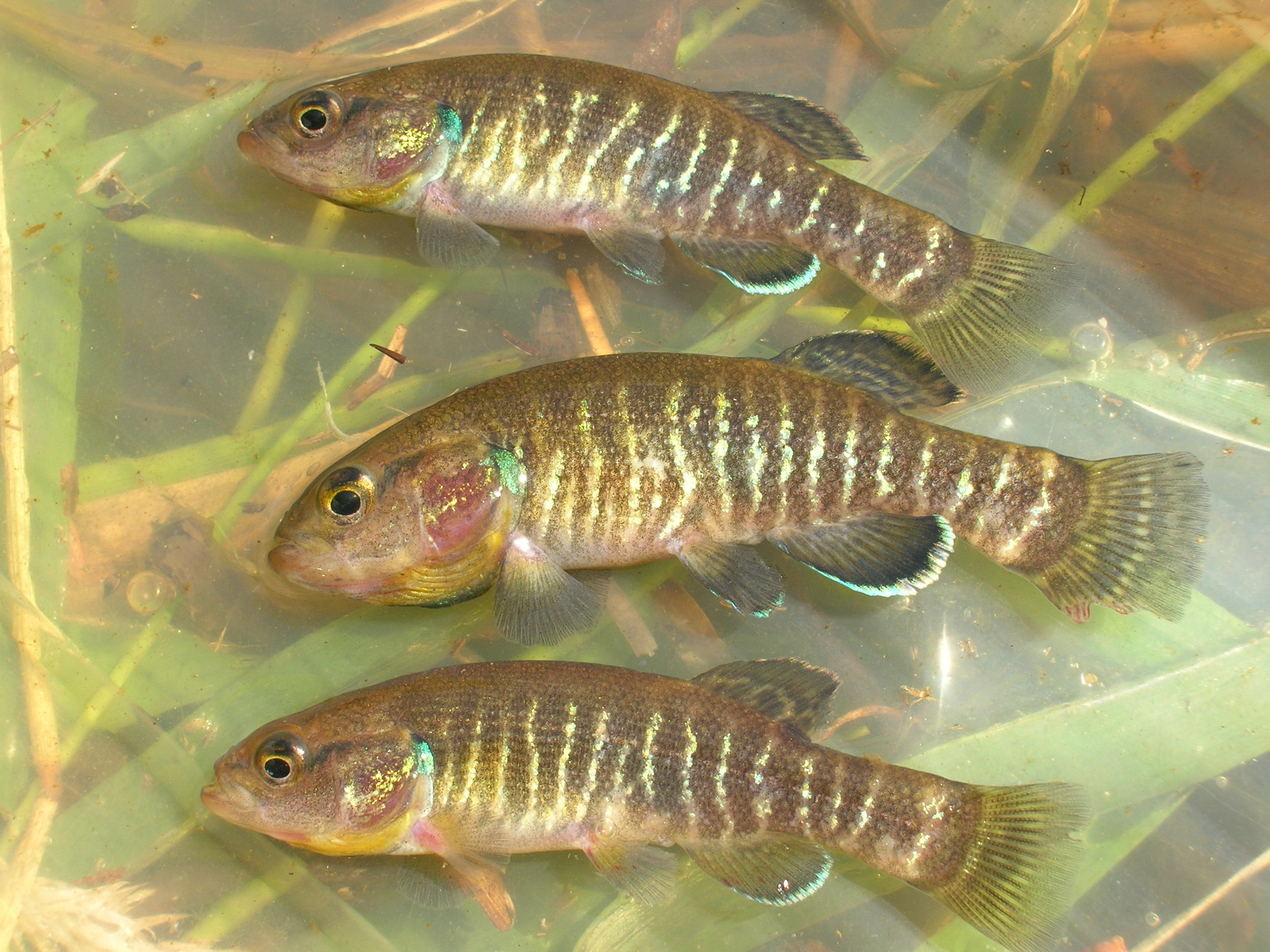

Conservation status
- Least Concern (IUCN 3.1)

Scientific classification
- Kingdom: Animalia
- Phylum: Chordata
- Class: Actinopterygii
- Division: Teleostei
- Order: Salmoniformes
- Family: Esocidae
- Genus: Novumbra
- Species: N. hubbsi

Binomial name
- Novumbra hubbsi L. P. Schultz, 1929

= Olympic mudminnow =

Species of fish

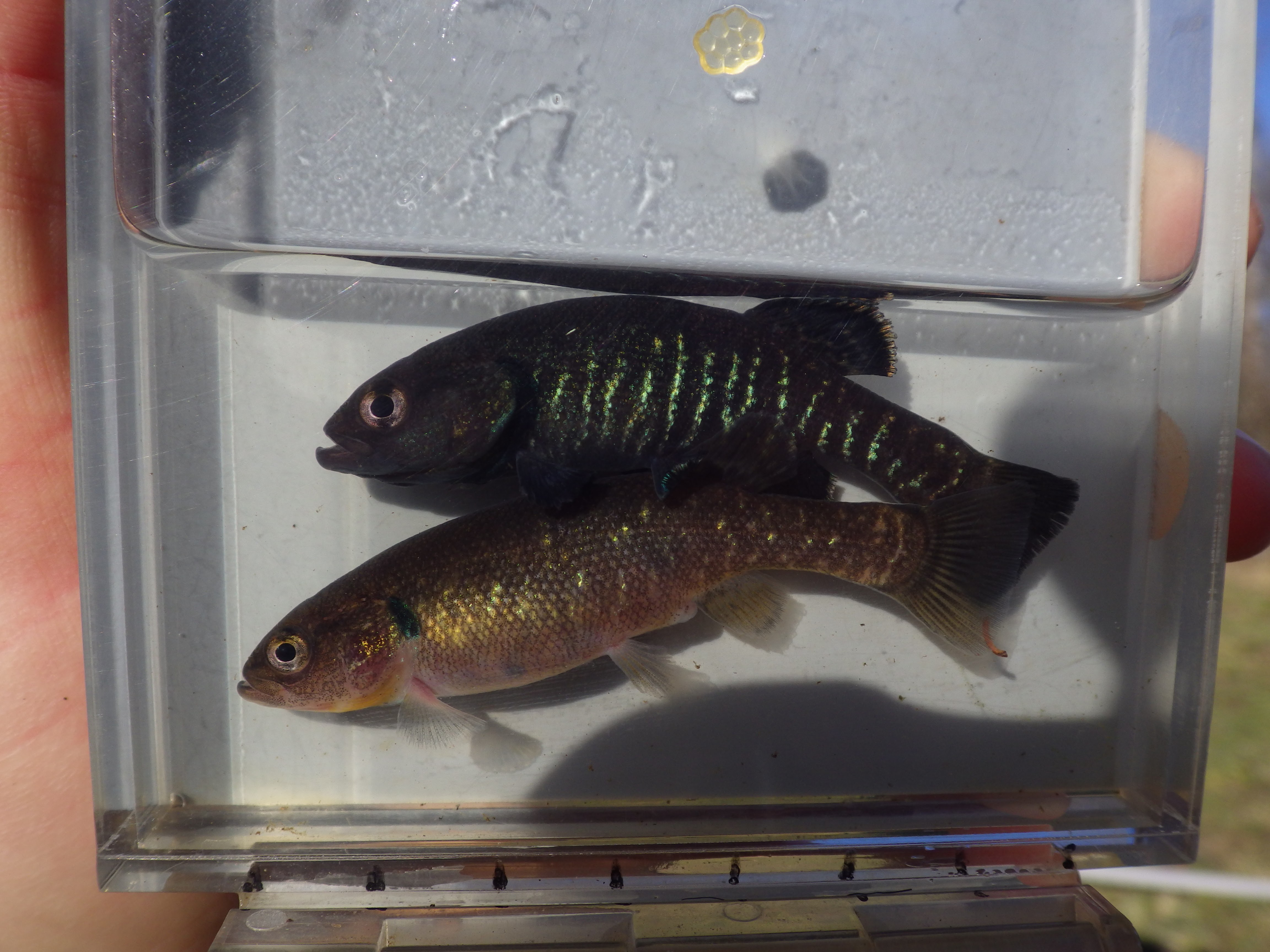
Novumbra hubbsi male, female, and eggs near Chehalis, WA

The Olympic mudminnow (Novumbra hubbsi) is a fish native to the western lowlands of the US state of Washington: the Chehalis River basin, Deschutes River basin, and some Olympic Peninsula basins. It grows to 8 cm (about 3 in) in length, and is Washington's only known endemic freshwater fish species. Although they strongly resemble killifish, mudminnows are more closely related to pike and muskellunge.

The Olympic mudminnow is the only living species in the genus Novumbra, and one of eight living species worldwide in the paraphyletic family Umbridae. It predominantly resides in darkly stained tannic waters in the lower levels of lentic ecosystems, although may be found in clearwater swamps, and feeds on fish larvae, eggs, but more often small invertebrates. It prefers areas with mudbeds and dense vegetation, and has a remarkable tolerance for low oxygen levels. The Olympic mudminnow is listed as a sensitive species by the state of Washington. Although many populations are found, the range is limited, and suitable habitat is easily lost to development.

Spawning occurs after overwintering with a short photoperiod and temperatures under 40 degrees Fahrenheit. Once temperatures are in the high 50's, fish will start producing gametes. Females will become noticeably fatter, while males will darken and begin to move into their spawning territories. Spawning takes place over fine leaved plants (submerged terrestrial moss and water wisteria have both been documented in the lab and in the wild) in which the male entices the female to spawn. Spawning happens multiple times as the female only releases one or two eggs for each copulation. Once finished resealing eggs, the female is chased off the territory by the male. After around 10 days, the fry hatch and remain glued to their natal plant until absorbing their yolk sac; after 7 days they become free swimming. The male shows no parental care aside from chasing off any intruders in the territory.

Knowledge of the ecology of Olympic mudminnow is limited, which limits management and conservation actions for this species.

Where their ranges overlap, the spawning coloration of the three-spined stickleback is black, similarly to male Olympic mudminnows. This causes rivalry between the males of the two species.

== Etymology ==
The fish is named in honor of ichthyologist Carl Leavitt Hubbs.
