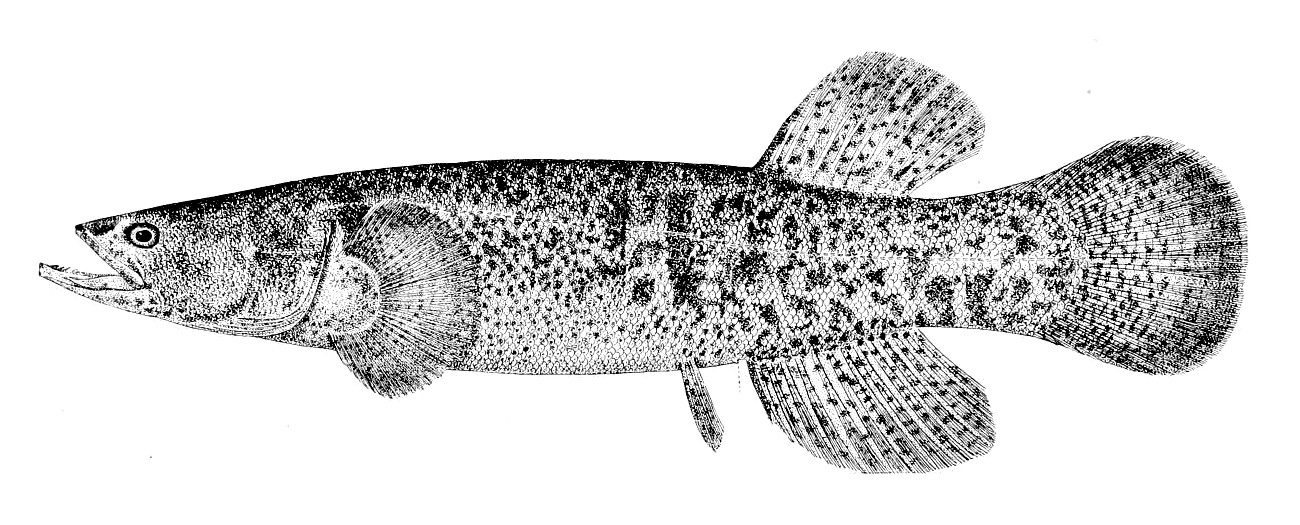
- Dallia pectoralis

Scientific classification
- Kingdom: Animalia
- Phylum: Chordata
- Class: Actinopterygii
- Order: Salmoniformes
- Family: Esocidae
- Subfamily: Dalliinae; Jordan, 1885
- Genus: Dallia; T. H. Bean, 1880

= Dallia =

Dallia Temporal range: Late Miocene–present

Genus of fishes

Dallia (Blackfish) is a genus of mudminnows native to Russia and Alaska. Molecular data indicates the genus is more closely related to Esox and Novumbra than Umbra. Dallia diverged from Novumbra + Esox approximately 66 million years ago. The genus was named after American naturalist William Healey Dall.

== Species ==
Three species in this genus are recognized:

- Dallia admirabilis Chereshnev, 1980 (Amguema blackfish)
- Dallia delicatissima Smitt, 1881 (Pilkhykay blackfish)
- Dallia pectoralis T. H. Bean, 1880 (Alaska blackfish)

Mitochondrial sequence data was examined from D. pectoralis and D. admirabilis and did not indicate that speciation within the genus in Russia; however, genetic isolation within Alaska for populations of D. pectoralis could be high and associated with karyotype differences.

Fossil remains of Dallia are known from the Late Miocene near Homer, Alaska, suggesting they were found further south in the past. Pleistocene-aged fossil remains also suggest they ranged significantly more west in Siberia as well.
