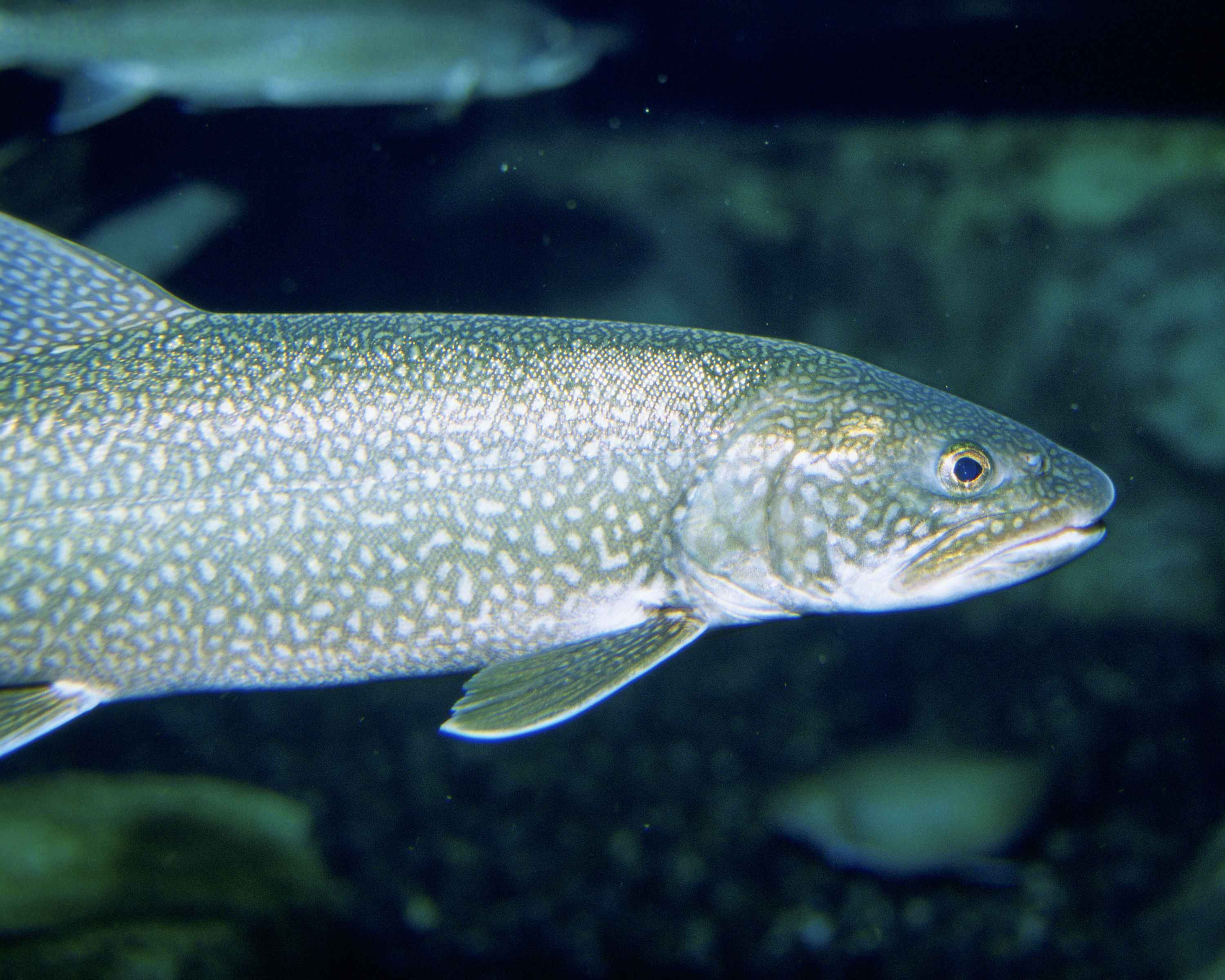
- Lake trout (Salvelinus namaycush)
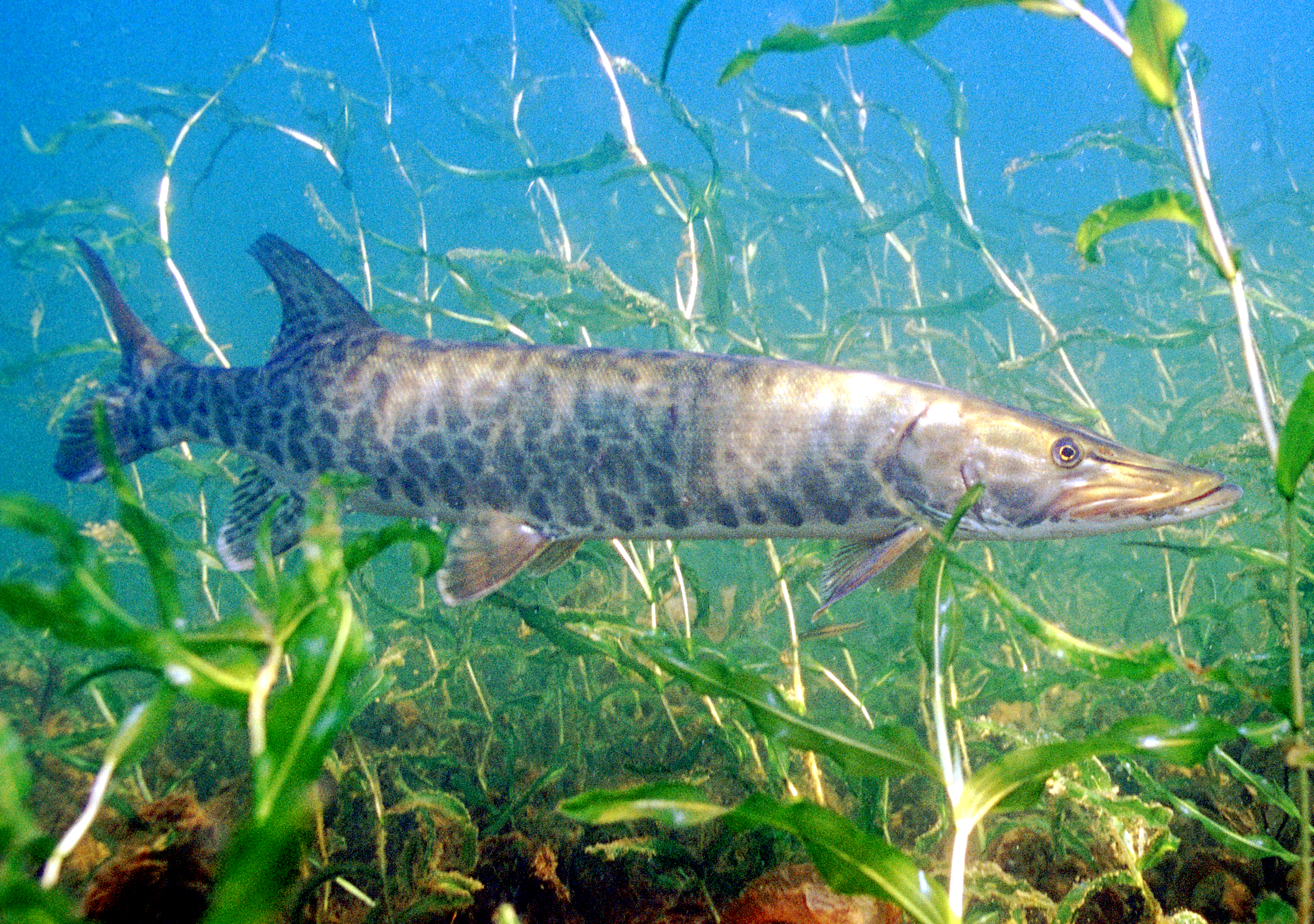
- Muskellunge (Esox masquinony)

Scientific classification
- Kingdom: Animalia
- Phylum: Chordata
- Class: Actinopterygii
- Division: Teleostei
- Superorder: Protacanthopterygii
- Order: Salmoniformes; Bleeker, 1859

Families
- Salmonidae; Esocidae; Umbridae

= Salmoniformes =

Salmoniformes Temporal range: Cenomanian–present

Order of fishes

Salmoniformes (/sælˈmɒnɪfɔːrmiːz/, lit. "salmon-shaped") is an order of ray-finned fishes native to the temperate and subarctic Northern Hemisphere. It contains two suborders: Salmonoidei (containing only the Salmonidae) and Esocoidei (containing pikes and mudminnows). In addition, potential fossil members of the group, dating back to the Late Cretaceous, are also known from Europe and Africa. Both large-sized members of this order (Salmonidae and Esocidae) are important food and sport fish of the Northern Hemisphere.

== Taxonomy ==
The relationship between salmons, pikes, and mudminnows has long been well-attested based on phylogenetic and morphological studies, and all three groups were long placed in the Salmoniformes. In the early 21st century, pikes and mudminnows were split from the Salmoniformes and placed into their own order, Esociformes. However, as recent studies have reaffirmed their close relationship, more recent taxonomic authorities again place the Esociformes as a group within the Salmoniformes (Esocoidei).

The following classification is based on Eschmeyer's Catalog of Fishes:

- Order Salmoniformes
  - Suborder Esocoidei
    - Family Esocidae Rafinesque, 1815 - pikes
      - Subfamily Dalliinae Jordan, 1885 - blackfishes
      - Subfamily Esocinae Rafinesque, 1815 - pikes
    - Family Umbridae Bonaparte, 1845 - mudminnows
  - Suborder Salmonoidei
    - Family Salmonidae Cuvier, 1816
      - Subfamily Coregoninae Bonaparte, 1845
      - Subfamily Thymallinae Gill, 1885
      - Subfamily Salmoninae Cuvier, 1816

The following fossil taxa are also considered much more basal members of this order:

- †Barcarenichthys Gayet, 1989 (Cenomanian of Portugal)
- †Kermichthys Taverne, 1992 (Cenomanian of Morocco)
- †Pyrenichthys Gayet & Lepicard, 1985 (Maastrichtian of France)
- ?†Stompooria Anderson, 1998 (potentially a galaxiiform) (Maastrichtian of South Africa)

Indeterminate potential salmoniform remains are known from Santonian-aged freshwater deposits of Hungary.

In the past, other euteleost fish such as the smelts or tubeshoulders were also placed within this order, but such a placement is now known to be inaccurate. Phylogenetic studies generally recover either the Argentiniformes or the Galaxiiformes as the closest relatives of the Salmoniformes.
