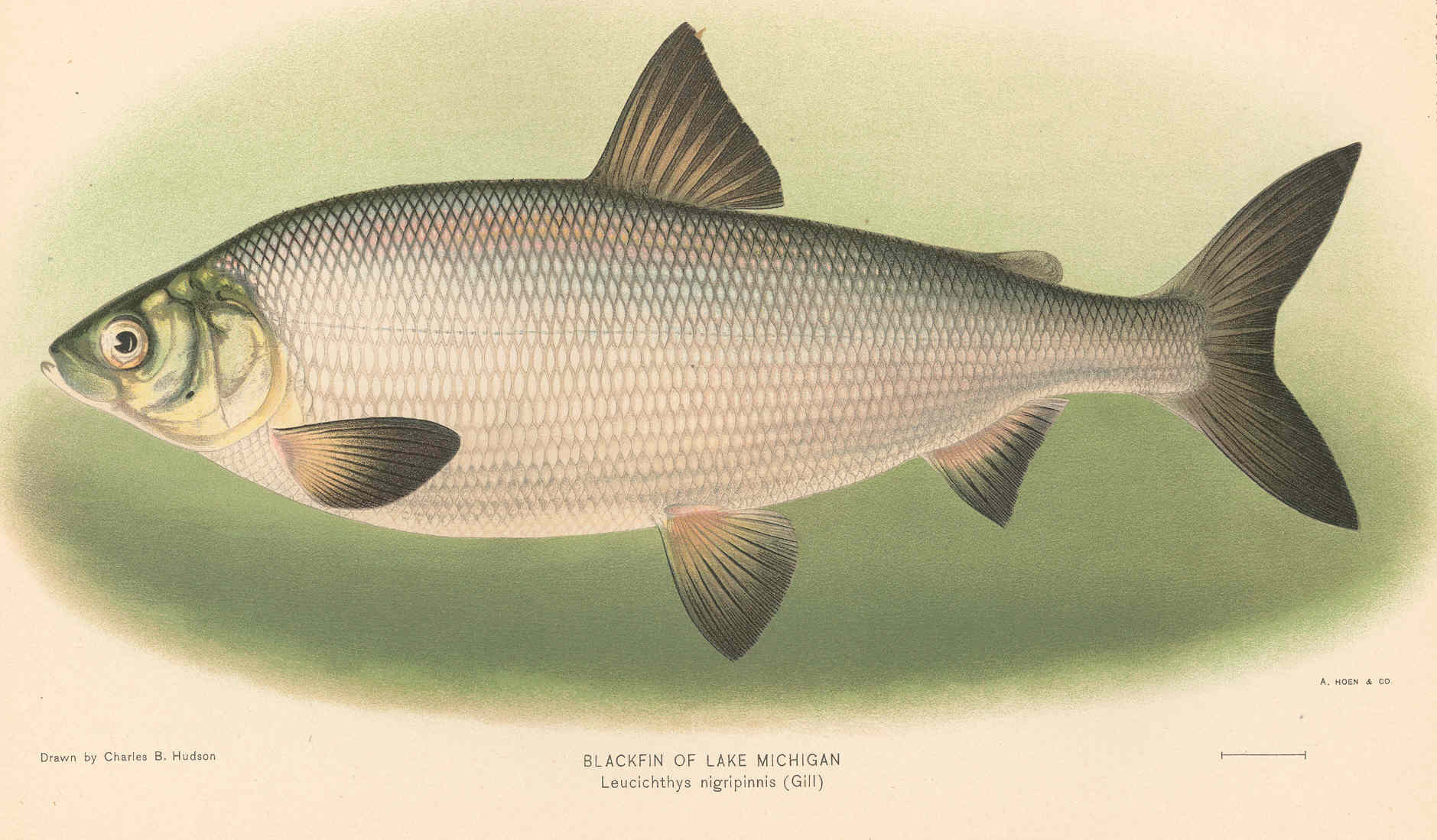

Conservation status
- Extinct (IUCN 3.1)

Scientific classification
- Kingdom: Animalia
- Phylum: Chordata
- Class: Actinopterygii
- Order: Salmoniformes
- Family: Salmonidae
- Genus: Coregonus
- Species: †C. nigripinnis

Binomial name
- †Coregonus nigripinnis (Milner, 1874)

= Blackfin cisco =

Species of fish

The blackfin cisco (Coregonus nigripinnis) was a North American salmonid fish in the freshwater whitefish sub-family Coregoninae. This silvery, deep-bodied fish with black fins, large eyes, a blunt snout and a terminal mouth, was one of the largest forms of ciscoes. The blackfin cisco used to inhabit the Great Lakes of North America until recently, but has been reported to have gone extinct. The blackfin cisco is a member of the C. artedi complex, whose taxonomy has not yet been resolved, and it may not represent a valid species.

== Taxonomy ==
The species was first mentioned by P.R. Hoy 1872, attributing Gill as the species authority, but Gill's manuscript was never published. The first valid description of this species is attributed to James Wood Milner in 1874.

The taxonomy of C. nigripinnis, along with other ciscoes in the C. artedi complex, is unresolved. C. nigripinnis was recognized by W.N. Koelz in 1929 to consist of four subspecies, but he had difficulty distinguishing some specimens from C. kiyi. The subspecies he named were C. n. nigripinnis in Lake Huron and Lake Michigan, C. n. cyanopterus in Lake Superior, C. n. prognathus in Lake Ontario and C. n. regalis in Lake Nipigon. C. n. cyanopterus was later synonymized with C. zenithicus, and C. n. prognathus was declared a nomen dubium. Specimens from inland lakes in central Canada are generally regarded to be C. artedi.

Turgeon and Bernatchez proposed in 2003 to merge several cisco species, including the blackfin cisco, into the taxon C. artedi sensu lato.

== Description ==
It was a dark silvery color, with a dark green to black back, and pink or purple on the sides; the outer half of the fins was black. Blackfin ciscoes measured up to 510 mm (21 inches in length). Its preferred habitat was cold lakes at depths of up to 180 metres (590 ft).

== Decline ==
The decline of the species was largely caused by overfishing, which occurred during the 1950s as the result of mismanagement in an unregulated fishery, and predation from the invading sea lamprey. The introduced alewife (Alosa pseudoharengus) and rainbow smelt (Osmerus mordax) were also aggressive predators of juveniles. Blackfin ciscoes were commercially fished until the early 1960s when declining stocks made the fishery uneconomic. Current threats to any remaining populations include commercial fishing, predation by rainbow smelt and interbreeding with lake herring (Coregonus artedi).

The blackfin cisco was last seen in Lake Huron in 1960 and in Lake Michigan in 1969. The last sighting of the previously-linked "cyanopterus" population was in 2006 in Long Lake near Thunder Bay on Lake Superior. This species may still be extant in Lake Nipigon. The IUCN Red List lists it as extinct in 1996. The Committee on the Status of Endangered Wildlife in Canada listed it as threatened in 1988 and as data deficient in 2007, due to the uncertainty of its taxonomic status. Efforts are being made to consider reintroducing populations of cisco into the Great lakes, specifically Lake Michigan.
