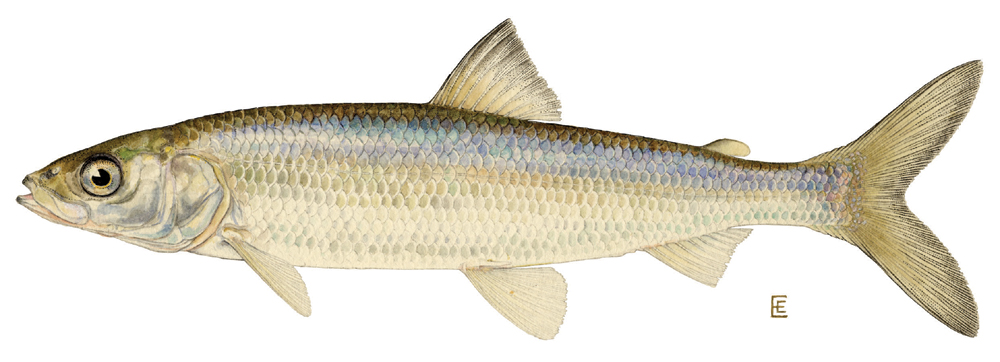

Conservation status
- Least Concern (IUCN 2.3)

Scientific classification
- Kingdom: Animalia
- Phylum: Chordata
- Class: Actinopterygii
- Division: Teleostei
- Order: Salmoniformes
- Family: Salmonidae
- Genus: Coregonus
- Species: C. artedi

Binomial name
- Coregonus artedi Lesueur, 1818

= Coregonus artedi =

Species of fish

Coregonus artedi, commonly known as the cisco, is a North American species of freshwater whitefish in the family Salmonidae. The number of species and definition of species limits in North American ciscoes is a matter of debate. Accordingly, Coregonus artedi may refer either narrowly (sensu stricto) to one of the several types of cisco found e.g. in the Great Lakes, or broadly (sensu lato) to the complex of all ciscoes in continental North American lakes, Coregonus artedi sensu lato.

== Coregonus artedi, narrow sense ==
Narrowly defined, Coregonus artedi is known variously with the common names cisco, northern cisco, lake herring, chub or tullibee and its Anishinaabe name Odoonibiins. It is a pelagic fish occurring in the midwater zone of cold water lakes in North America. In the northern and western parts of its range it is also found in large rivers.

This species occasionally grows as large as 40 cm and 2.3 kg (five pounds), but is more commonly 28 to 38 cm long and 170 to 907 grams (six ounces to two pounds) in weight. It is slender-bodied and silvery with pinkish iridescence on its sides.

Diet is predominantly zooplankton and insect larvae, although fish eggs and larvae, including those of their own species are also documented. Small fish, including some minnow species, are also known to be consumed at times.

Northern cisco are preyed upon by a wide variety of predatory species, and have a particularly important place in the diet of lake trout (Salvelinus namaycush). It is also a common food of rainbow trout (Oncorhynchus mykiss), northern pike (Esox lucius), burbot (Lota lota), yellow perch, (Perca flavescens) and walleye (Sander vitreum) where the species overlap ranges.

The abundance of northern cisco in the North American Great Lakes is much reduced from the levels of the 19th Century. Once abundant in all five lakes, it is now common only in Lake Superior. The Lake Huron population has been increasing recently, perhaps as a consequence of low alewife (Alosa pseudoharengus) abundance. Limited numbers have also reappeared in Lake Michigan's lower Green Bay. Numbers in Lakes Erie and Ontario remain far below historical levels. The reduced abundance is believed to result from the cumulative effects of several factors, including the expansion of non-native species such as alewife, rainbow smelt (Osmerus mordax) and sea lamprey (Petromyzon marinus). These species prey on and compete with various life stages of northern cisco. It is unclear what effect the annual stocking of several million non-native Pacific salmon in the Great Lakes has had on northern cisco.

Additionally, substantial environmental degradation in some parts of the range has undoubtedly contributed to the stresses on northern cisco populations. The populations are therefore believed to be more vulnerable to the effects of exploitation than previously, even at levels of harvest lower than what was once sustainable. The cisco is also very sensitive to changes in temperature and levels of dissolved oxygen.

Northern cisco are fished commercially and for sport. In the early years of the fishery, herring provided some of the largest catches from the Great Lakes and, when salted down or smoked for preservation, provisioned much of the surrounding territory. Northern cisco roe is also valued on the international market.

== The Coregonus artedi species complex ==
The northern cisco or lake herring discussed above is one of several closely related North American species or forms of cisco. The group is the subject of considerable debate about the taxonomic independence and relationships of the different forms, and it has been credibly argued that they all comprise merely one highly variable larger species that also includes the ecologically and morphologically separable fishes, including the following at least (some of which may be extinct):

- Coregonus alpenae — longjaw cisco (extinct)
- Coregonus artedi sensu stricto — cisco, northern cisco or lake herring
- Coregonus johannae — deepwater cisco (extinct)
- Coregonus hoyi — bloater
- Coregonus kiyi — kiyi
- Coregonus nigripinnis — blackfin cisco (extinct)
- Coregonus reighardi — shortnose cisco (possibly extinct)
- Coregonus zenithicus — shortjaw cisco
- Coregonus hubbsi — Ives Lake cisco (possibly extinct)

Collectively, these fishes are often referred to as a species complex, the Coregonus artedi complex, or as Coregonus artedi sensu lato (broad sense).

== Fishing ==
=== Commercial fishing ===
Commercial fishing for northern cisco in Lake Superior and the Northern Channel of Lake Huron is a very important economical source for communities in the Great Lakes region. Commercial fishing for northern cisco began in the 1800s. Initially, in Lake Ontario, northern cisco were destroyed because they were thought of as a nuisance. However, there is evidence of a turnaround in the perception of northern cisco by 1833, where northern cisco were targeted and thought of as better eating than the related lake whitefish. In Ontario, the yield of northern cisco was 328 tonnes in 2018. This number is substantially lower than previous years dating back to 2012, all of which numbered over 350 tonnes. This decline was due to a reduction of quotas for commercial fisheries in hopes to combat a possible population decline.

While northern cisco does play an important role in the diet of many people still, its primary utility from commercial sources is for its roe. Caviar of northern cisco has become popular in Scandinavian culture, and is the leading cause of demand for northern cisco in recent decades. Smaller northern cisco can also be gill-netted and sold as bait for use in recreational fishing.

=== Recreational fishing ===
Northern cisco are fished recreationally in many parts of the United States and Canada. They are popular to catch, especially while ice fishing when they are more likely to be found in the shallower parts of the Great Lakes. Recreational fishing is not restricted to the Great Lakes. There is unique popularity for ice fishing in Lake Simcoe, where the fishery reopened in 2015 after a successful population rehabilitation.
