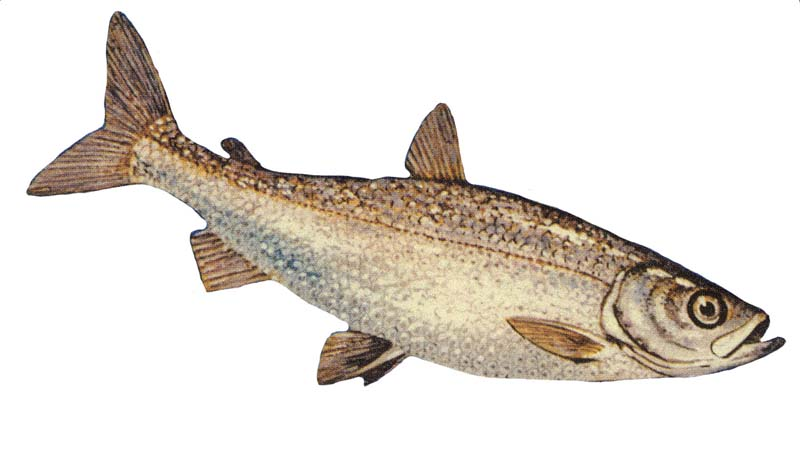

Conservation status
- Least Concern (IUCN 2.3)

- Apparently Secure (NatureServe)

Scientific classification
- Kingdom: Animalia
- Phylum: Chordata
- Class: Actinopterygii
- Order: Salmoniformes
- Family: Salmonidae
- Genus: Coregonus
- Species: C. hoyi

Binomial name
- Coregonus hoyi (Milner, 1874)

Synonyms
- Argyrosomus hoyi Milner, 1874

= Coregonus hoyi =

Bloater

Species of fish

Coregonus hoyi, also known as the bloater, is a species or form of freshwater whitefish in the family Salmonidae. It is a silvery-coloured herring-like fish, 25.5 centimetres (10.0 in) long. It is found in most of the Great Lakes and in Lake Nipigon, and inhabits underwater slopes. This fish is not to be confused with the extinct deepwater cisco (Coregonus johannae), a large fish that shared a common name with the bloater.

== Description ==
The bloater is a small, silvery-coloured whitefish with a pink and purple iridescence. It has a greenish tinge above, and a whitish belly. It is very similar to the kiyi, from which it may be distinguished by its lighter upper lip and smaller eye. Its body is deepest at its middle, it has small and pale fins, and it has 40–47 long gill rakers. The discoverer of the bloater, P. R. Hoy, thought it to be "the most beautiful of the white fish". It reaches a maximum total length of 37.0 centimetres (14.6 in) and commonly is 25.5 centimetres (10.0 in).

== Distribution ==
The bloater is native to all of the Great Lakes (except Lake Erie) and in Lake Nipigon. Across its range it is in decline, and it is listed as Vulnerable to global extinction by the IUCN Red List. It was extirpated in Lake Ontario and is extirpated in Lake Nipigon, is uncommon in Lake Michigan and is in decline Lakes Superior and Huron. This decline is caused mostly by predation by the alewife, and also by sea lamprey predation and pollution.

However, efforts to re-introduce the species in to Lake Ontario have been met with great success. Multiple North American fishery agencies have aided in the bloater's return to the lake, due to the positive impact it could have on its food web. Recent studies have shown that this fish has made a surprising comeback, and it is now re-established in Lake Ontario. State, provincial and federal agencies aim to stock 500,000 Coregonus hoyi into Lake Ontario by the year 2015.

== Taxonomy and etymology ==
The specific epithet of the bloater is given after Dr. P. R. Hoy of Racine, Wisconsin. Dr. Hoy collected the first specimens of this species in 1870 while dredging in Lake Michigan at least 16 miles (14 nmi; 26 km) off Racine, at depths of 50 to 70 fathoms (300 to 420 ft; 91 to 128 m). Hoy did not describe the fish himself, but had ichthyologist James W. Milner name the species. Milner placed it in the genus Argyrosomus, now considered a junior synonym of Coregonus, the genus in which the bloater is now placed. The generic name Coregonus, given by Carl Linnaeus in his 1758 tenth edition of Systema Naturæ, is derived from Greek and means "angled eye", referring to the tilted pupil of whitefishes. It is closely related to the cisco or lake herring, Coregonus artedi, and the shortjaw cisco, both of which it is known to hybridise with. The common name of the bloater comes from the swollen appearance it has after being brought up from the deep waters it inhabits. The same name is given to certain type of smoked herring in Britain, which is swelled in its preparation. The bloater is one of the several taxa in the Coregonus artedi complex of freshwater whitefishes, which sometimes all are considered to belong to a single species.

== Ecology and behaviour ==
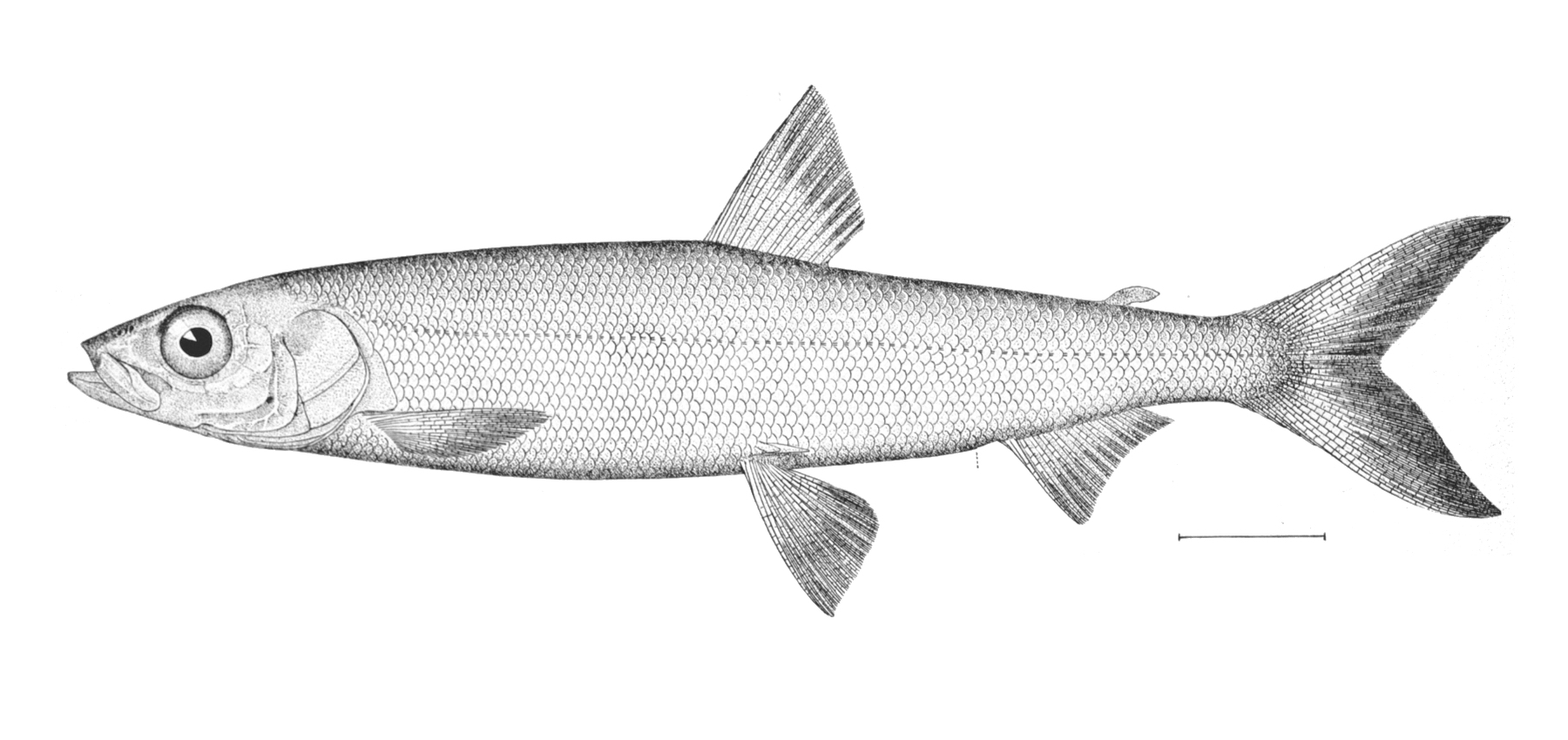
Illustration from The Natural History of Useful Aquatic Animals

The bloater is found at depths of 30 to 198 metres (98 to 650 ft). There it inhabits underwater slopes, and is tolerant of temperatures between 34.7 and 52.4 degrees Fahrenheit (1.5 to 11.4 Celsius). When it is brought to the surface its gas bladder expands, giving it a swollen appearance.

The bloater feeds mostly on animals living at the lake bottom (zoobenthos), but will sometimes eat small drifting animals, or zooplankton. The shrimp Mysis diluviana, and the amphipod Diporeia hoyi, also named after P. R. Hoy, are recorded as food items. The lake trout, various species of introduced salmon, and the burbot all are known to prey on the bloater. In the nineteenth century it was abundant, and was often caught by fishermen, among whom it was known as the "moon-eye". It was considered a good panfish, but too small to be marketable. Since most of the other "chubs" of the Great Lakes have become extinct, the average size of the bloater has increased, and it is caught and smoked in the United States. The bloater is ignored by sport fishermen, since it is small and found at great depths, and it has too small of a mouth to be used as bait.

Spawning occurs all year round, but is usually in the winter or autumn. Spawning occurs at depths of 37 to 92 metres (121 to 302 ft). The amount of eggs produced by the female varies depending upon her size, and ranges between 3,230 and 18,768. Eggs incubate for 4 months, and bloaters are 1.01 centimetres (0.40 in) in length at hatching. Larval bloaters head to the cool bottom of lakes before becoming pelagic, and by their first summers they become bottom-dwellers. Larval bloaters have a high mortality until they become large enough to avoid predation by other bloaters and alewives. It is slow-growing, because of the scarcity of food in its habitat. The bloater's average length at maturity is 18.3 centimetres (7.2 in), and maximum age reported from otoliths is 10 years.

== Works cited ==
- Becker, George C. (1983). Fishes of Wisconsin. Madison, Wisconsin: University of Wisconsin Press. ISBN 0-299-08790-5.
- Crowder, Larry B.; Binkowski, Fred P. (1983). "Foraging behaviors and the interaction of alewife, Alosa pseudoharengus, and bloater, Coregonus hoyi". Environmental Biology of Fishes. 8 (2): 105–113. doi:10.1007/BF00005177. S2CID 46623493.
- Dickson, Tom (2008). The Great Minnesota Fish Book. Minneapolis, Minnesota: University of Minnesota Press. ISBN 978-0-8166-5135-1.
- Froese, Rainer; Pauly, Daniel, eds. (2009). "Coregonus hoyi". FishBase.
- Gimenez Dixon, M. (1996). "Coregonus hoyi". IUCN Red List of Threatened Species. 1996 e.T5366A11123739. doi:10.2305/IUCN.UK.1996.RLTS.T5366A11123739.en.
- Hesselberg, Robert J.; Hickey, James P.; Nortrup, David A.; Willford, Wayne A. (1990). "Contaminant residues in the bloater (Coregonus hoyi) of Lake Michigan, 1969–1986". Journal of Great Lakes Research. 16 (1): 121–129. doi:10.1016/s0380-1330(90)71403-7. Archived from the original on 2011-07-28.
- Hubbs, Carl C.; Lagler, Karl F.; Smith, Gerald R. (2004). Fishes of the Great Lakes Region (revised ed.). Ann Arbor, Michigan: University of Michigan Press. ISBN 0-472-11371-2.
- Page, Lawrence M.; Burr, Brooks M. (1991). A Field Guide to Freshwater Fishes. Boston, Massachusetts: Houghton Mifflin. ISBN 0-395-91091-9.
- Partridge, Eric (1983). Origins: A Short Etymological Dictionary of Modern English. New York: Greenwich House. ISBN 0-517-414252.
- Rice, James A.; Crowder, Larry B.; Binkowski, Fred P. (1987). "Evaluating Potential Sources of Mortality for Larval Bloater (Coregonus hoyi): Starvation and Vulnerability to Predation". Canadian Journal of Fisheries and Aquatic Sciences. 44 (2): 467–472. doi:10.1139/f87-055.
- Smith, Hugh M. (1895). Marshall, McDonald (ed.). "Notes on Two Hitherto Unrecognised Species of American Whitefishes". Bulletin of the United States Fish Commission. XIV: 1–14.
- "Fish of the Great Lakes: Profiles". Wisconsin Sea Grant. Archived from the original on 23 March 2010.
