= Great Lakes Fishery Commission =

US-Canadian commission

The Great Lakes Fishery Commission (GLFC) is a bi-national commission made up of representatives of the United States and Canada. It was formed by the Convention on Great Lakes Fisheries, concluded in 1954 and ratified in 1955. The commission has eight members: four appointed by the Privy Council of Canada and four appointed by the President of the United States for six-year terms. The commission conducts research, makes recommendations to manage Great Lakes fisheries, and eradicates sea lamprey from the Great Lakes.

== Program ==
GLFC is also involved in global fish regulation. The Canadian government increased funding for sea lamprey population control program. Terry Sheehan stated:

"The sea lamprey control program of the Great Lakes Fishery Commission is a shining example of the binational commitment between Canada and the United States....I am pleased to be reaffirming our dedication to...through this increase in annual funding...."

== Invasive species control ==
Populations of sea lamprey in the region are controlled by TFM, a lampricide targeting the specific species, largely non-toxic to other marine species, and which does not spread throughout bodies of water. The United States Fish and Wildlife Service, Fisheries and Oceans Canada, and United States Army Corps of Engineers have all contributed to lamprey control research. As sea lamprey primarily feed on larvae, biological research efforts have aimed to determine the nature of the larval sea lamprey, which would provide information about species distribution, size structure, presence, and population in territories they inhabit.

Traps are often set to prevent them moving upstream to spawn in the aim of reducing the spawning of individuals.

The GLFC and the Grand Rapids White Water are planned on additional funds equal to a seven million federal dollar increase for lamprey control. The budget is intended to restore balance in the ecosystem of the rapids by protecting populations of other species from the lamprey. GLFC is working on a lamprey barrier.
