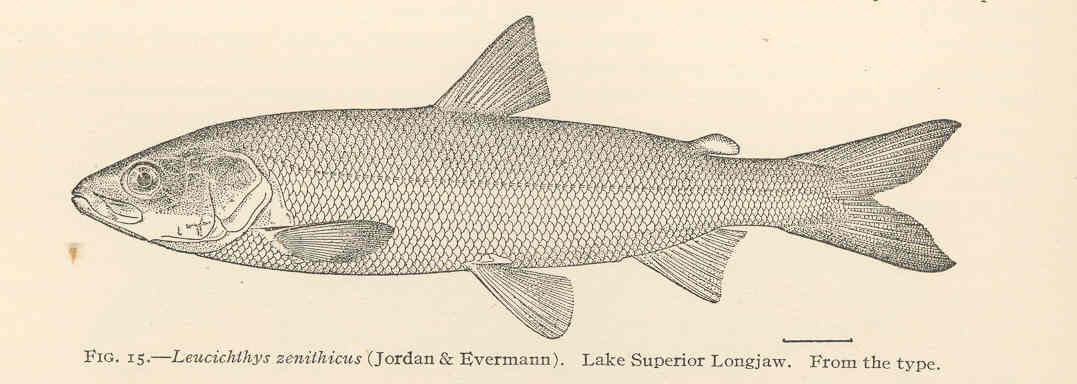

Conservation status
- Vulnerable (IUCN 2.3)

Scientific classification
- Kingdom: Animalia
- Phylum: Chordata
- Class: Actinopterygii
- Order: Salmoniformes
- Family: Salmonidae
- Genus: Coregonus
- Species: C. zenithicus

Binomial name
- Coregonus zenithicus (D. S. Jordan & Evermann, 1909)

= Shortjaw cisco =

Species of fish

The shortjaw cisco (Coregonus zenithicus) is a North-American freshwater whitefish in the salmon family. Adult fish range to about 30 cm (12 in) in length and are silver, tinged with green above and paler below. One of the members of the broader Coregonus artedi complex of ciscoes, it is distributed widely in the deeper lakes of Canada, but populations in the Great Lakes have been declining and it is no longer present in Lakes Michigan, Huron, and Erie. It feeds mainly on crustaceans and insect larvae and spawns in the autumn on the lake bed. It is part of the important cisco (chub) fishery in the Great Lakes. The International Union for Conservation of Nature has rated its conservation status as "vulnerable". Shortjaw cisco have however evolved from the cisco Coregonus artedi independently in different lakes and different parts of the range, and conservation assessments therefore should be made on a lake-wise rather than range-wide basis.

== Description ==
The shortjaw cisco has large, smooth scales and is iridescent silver, with a greenish back and white belly. The mouth is small and toothless, and the lower jaw is shorter than or equal in length to the upper jaw. It typically weighs approximately 300 g (11 oz), and ranges from 150 to greater than 300 mm (6 to 12 inches) standard length. Very difficult to differentiate from other cisco species by superficial appearance, this species typically has fewer gillrakers than other ciscoes.

== Distribution ==
Once common throughout the upper Laurentian Great Lakes Coregonus zenithicus is no longer found in Lake Michigan or Lake Huron, with the last specimens reported in 1975 and in 1982, respectively. It has been absent from Lake Erie since 1957. The population in Lake Superior is known to be lower than historic levels, based on commercial catch statistics. Its status in Lake Nipigon is uncertain. It has been reported in at least 22 other lakes outside of the Great Lakes, from the Canadian provinces of Ontario, Manitoba, Saskatchewan, Alberta, and the Northwest Territories. It is not known whether the remaining Great Lakes populations are increasing, decreasing or stable. Population trends in other lakes are unknown.

== Habitat ==
The shortjaw cisco is most commonly found in the deeper waters of large lakes. It has been found at depths of between 55 and 114 m (180 and 374 ft) in Lakes Superior, Michigan, and Huron, and is known to exhibit seasonal changes in depth distribution in Lake Superior.

== Reproduction ==
Spawning occurs in the autumn. Eggs are deposited over the lake bottom in deep water and develop over three to four months, depending on water temperature. This fish reaches sexual maturity at five years of age.

== Ecology ==
Crustaceans and insect larvae are important food items. Lake trout (Salvelinus namaycush) and burbot (Lota lota) are known to feed on shortjaw cisco. Shortjaw cisco are believed to be vulnerable to the invasive sea lamprey (Petromyzon marinus,) which has presumably played a role in its decline in the Great Lakes, where expansion in the range of sea lamprey has overlapped the decline in shortjaw cisco numbers.

== Fisheries ==
This species was an important component of the cisco (chub) fishery in the Great Lakes. Competition and predation from rainbow smelt (Osmerus mordax) and alewife (Alosa pseudoharengus), two introduced exotic fish species, have had a negative impact on shortjaw cisco populations. The cumulative effect of these factors, sea lamprey predation and habitat changes associated with urban, agricultural, and industrial activities in the Great Lakes Basin undoubtedly combined to make this species vulnerable to over-exploitation, even at exploitation rates that had once been sustainable.

In lake Superior, the shortjaw cisco has been part of deepwater cisco fisheries. The deepwater ciscoes there also comprise Coregonus hoyi and Coregonus kiyi.

== Systematics ==
The systematics of the group of fishes called "ciscoes" is complicated. The shortjaw cisco is part of the Coregonus artedi complex (which also comprises C. hoyi and C. kiyi). Particularly it was thought to be conspecific with the (presumably now extinct) longjaw cisco (Coregonus alpenae). Genetic data show that the shortjaw cisco is not a unique and coherent taxon, but has evolved from the sympatric Coregonus artedi s.str. independently in different lakes. Particularly there is a major distinction between the eastern and western parts of the range, and the differences between sympatric C. artedi and C. zenithicus are smaller than differences among lakes.
