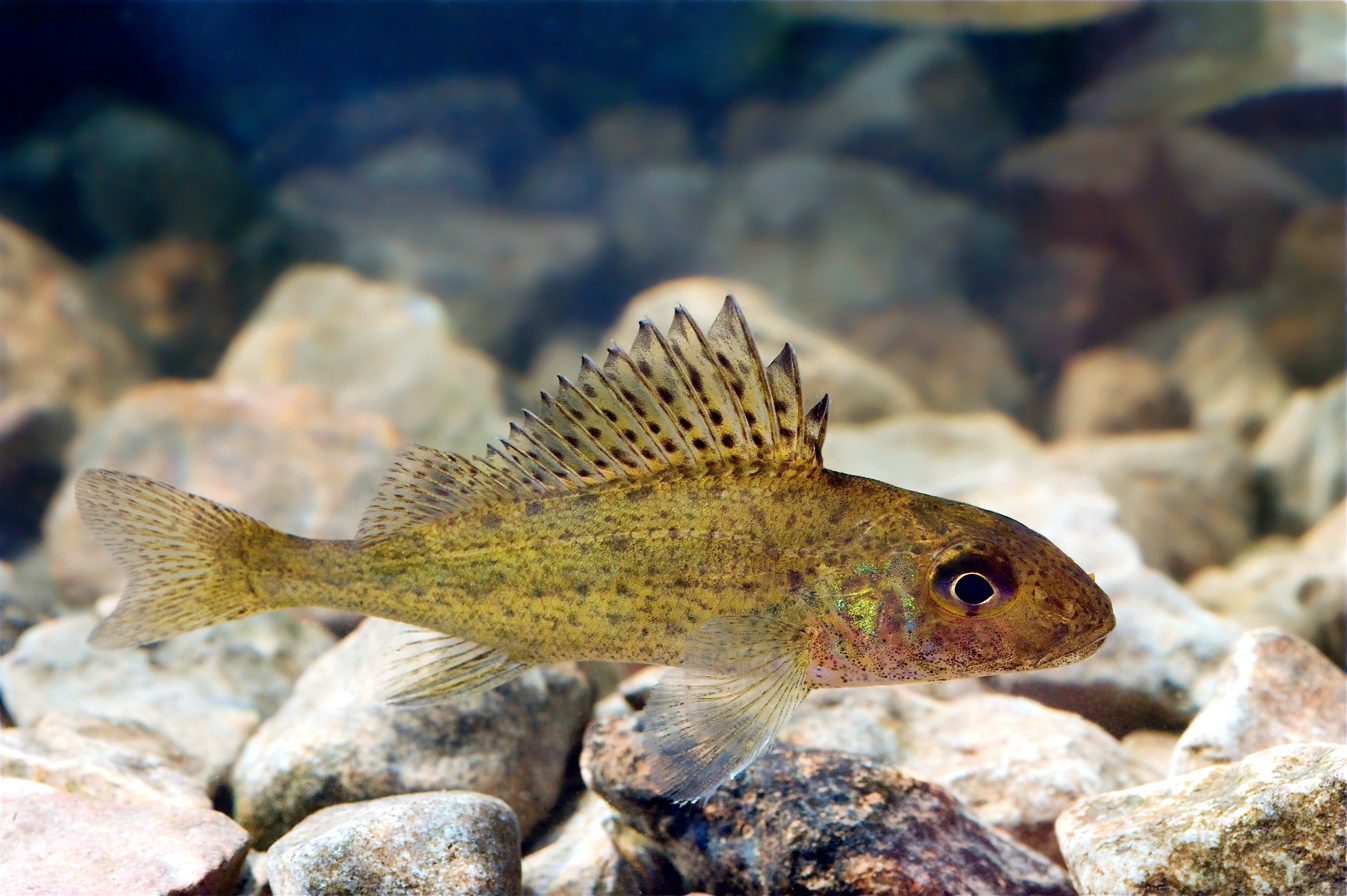
- Ruffe in Pärnu River (Estonia)

Conservation status
- Least Concern (IUCN 3.1)

Scientific classification
- Kingdom: Animalia
- Phylum: Chordata
- Class: Actinopterygii
- Division: Teleostei
- Order: Perciformes
- Family: Percidae
- Genus: Gymnocephalus
- Species: G. cernua

Binomial name
- Gymnocephalus cernua (Linnaeus, 1758)

Synonyms
- Perca cernuus Linnaeus, 1758; Acerina cernua (Linnaeus, 1758); Holocentrus post Lacépède, 1802; Cernua fluviatilis J. Fleming, 1828; Acerina vulgaris G. Cuvier, 1829; Acerina fischeri Eichwald, 1873; Acerina czekanowskii Dybowski, 1874; Acerina cernua danubica Vladykov, 1931 (ambiguous); Acerina cernua essipovi Burmakin, 1941

= Ruffe =

Species of fish

The ruffe (Gymnocephalus cernua), also known as the Eurasian ruffe or pope, is a freshwater fish found in temperate regions of Europe and northern Asia. It has been introduced into the Great Lakes of North America as an invasive species and is causing unfortunate results as it is reproducing faster than other species. Its common names are ambiguous – "ruffe" may refer to any local member of its genus Gymnocephalus, which as a whole is native to Eurasia.

== Description ==
The colours and markings are similar to those of the walleye, an olive-brown to golden-brown colour on its back, paler on the sides with yellowish white undersides. The ruffe can reach up to 25 cm (9.8 in) in length, but is usually around half that size. It is a very aggressive fish for its size. The ruffe also has a large, spiny dorsal fin which is likely distasteful to its predators. It also has two fins on top, the front fin has hard and sharp spines, the back fin has soft spines called rays. The most obvious features to recognize a ruffe are the ruffe's large, continuous dorsal fin and its slightly downturned mouth.

== Distribution ==
The species occurs in the basins of the Caspian, Black, Aral, Baltic and North Sea, and is also found in Great Britain, parts of Scandinavia and some regions of the Arctic Ocean basin eastward to the drainage of the Kolyma. It has been introduced to parts of Western Europe (France, northern Italy) and Greece, as well as to the North American Great Lakes.

== Diet ==
In Eurasia, the ruffe diet mainly consists of zoobenthos: chironomids, small aquatic bugs and larvae, which are all found in the benthic zone of the water column. As far as researchers have been able to learn, it has kept the same diet in its transfer to the Great Lakes.

== Reproduction ==
The ruffe has the capacity to reproduce at an extremely high rate. A ruffe usually matures in two to three years, but a ruffe that lives in warmer waters has the ability to reproduce in the first year of life. A single female has the potential to lay from 130,000 to 200,000 eggs annually. Ruffe will leave the deep dark water where they prefer and journey to warmer shallow water for spawning. The primary spawning season for the ruffe occurs from the middle of April through approximately June.

== Life cycle ==
Ruffe egg sizes typically range from 0.34 to 1.3 mm (0.013 to 0.051 in) in diameter, depending on the size of the female. If the same female has a second batch in the same season, the eggs will be smaller than the first batch. The size of the second batch of eggs is about 0.36 to 0.47 mm (0.014 to 0.019 in), while the first batch of eggs goes from 0.90 to 1.213 mm (0.0354 to 0.0478 in) in size. If the female lays twice in one season, there is usually one in late winter/early spring and one in late summer. Hatching occurs in 5–12 days in temperatures of 10–15 °C (50–59 °F). The next stage in life is the embryonic/juvenile stage. Embryos that are freshly hatched are between 3.5 and 4.4 mm (0.14 and 0.17 in) in size. These embryos are sedentary for 3–7 days, and in that time grow to about 4.5 to 5.0 mm (0.18 to 0.20 in) in length. One week after the hatching, the young ruffe start to swim and feed actively; they do not form schools at this age.

From here, the ruffe gradually mature until they are 2–3 years old, when they reach full maturity. At full length, the adult ruffe is usually around 20 cm (7.9 in), and a maximum of 29 cm (11 in) Growth usually occurs more when the ruffe is in clear, brackish waters. Generally, female and male ruffe do not live longer than 7 to 11 years.

== Presence in the North American Great Lakes area ==
=== Ecological effects ===
The introduction of the ruffe seems to be causing much damage to Lake Superior. This fish's invasion of the lake has not only caused problems with space, but competing with other fish for food supply. The ruffe has similar eating habits, but an accelerated reproduction rate compared to other similar fish. Therefore, having more ruffe in the water leads to less food for other fish. This fish is unique in its ability to adapt in many habitats and temperatures, resulting in success despite such factors as climate change or other biological changes. The ruffe also has an exceptional ability to detect water vibrations through organs called neuromasts. This trait both aids the ruffe in finding food and gives the ruffe an edge in avoiding predators. These develop into more advanced and sensitive organs as the fish matures; of note, the perch's neuromasts weaken as it matures. The ruffe has the potential to overtake many other fish species, and consequently damage the Great Lakes' ecosystem. Without concerted intervention, the ruffe have the potential to ruin Lake Superior.

The ruffe is the first invasive species to have been classified as a nuisance by the Non-indigenous Aquatic Nuisance Prevention and Control Program. Along with it being the most populous fish in the St. Louis river basin, it has disrupted ecosystems all across the Great Lakes. The invasion was first noticed in the 1980s by the DNR. They suggest that the fish was introduced to the lake via ballast water that was dumped into the Duluth, Minnesota, harbor by anchored freight ships. Ever since the ruffe were detected, studies have shown that the ruffe and the yellow perch are closely related and are quickly becoming rivals. The ruffe and perch are competing in numbers and are also competing for food; this is a match that the ruffe are winning.

=== Control ===
Ever since the ruffe was introduced into the Great Lakes system, scientists and fishery managers have been searching for the right way to get rid of them. In the beginning, the main method of control was to increase the Walleye and Northern Pike populations, because they are natural predators of the ruffe.

Other methods that have been considered are poison and chemical control. If a large school of ruffe is found, they can be poisoned. If some survive, however, they will rapidly reproduce. Chemicals can be targeted to act on specific species of fish. The chemical lampricide TFM kills ruffe, but leaves other fish unharmed.

As long as a couple of the fish survive, they can move and repopulate. The problem will increase if the ruffe invade southern river systems. The use of pheromones is being investigated as a control. After extensive studies, scientists discovered that the ruffe can be repelled by their own alarm pheromone. When injured, a ruffe will release this pheromone into the water to warn other ruffe to stay away.

Scientists have concluded three things:

- The pheromone repels the ruffe (it was unclear if it would in the beginning).
- The pheromone is species specific, so it would only repel the ruffe, none of the other fish.
- The pheromone is resilient to freezing, so could be used even during Minnesota's long winter season; the ruffe could still be controlled. By using this method, scientists could block ruffe from natural mating spots and produce a population decline; their goal is to kill the species in the Great Lakes.

== Other invasive situations ==
Ruffe were first discovered in Loch Lomond, Scotland, in 1982, probably introduced as live bait by pike anglers. It is now abundant throughout the Loch. There are concerns about the effect of the huge ruffe population on the endemic whitefish population known as powan (Coregonus lavaretus) as ruffe prey on their eggs. Ruffe became the principal food item for the three main fish predators found in the area: the great cormorant, grey heron and northern pike.

== Sources ==
- Gangl, James Allen (1998). Effects of Eurasian Ruffe (Gymnocephalus cernuus) and Yellow Perch (Perca flavescens (M.S. thesis). Duluth: University of Minnesota. pp. 1–5.
- McLean, Mike. "Ruffe: A New Threat to Our Fisheries." Minnesota Sea Grant. 24 July 2007.1 Oct 2007 http://www.seagrant.umn.edu/ais/ruffe_threat
- Peter J. Maniak; Ryan D. Lossing & Peter W. Sorensen (2000). "Injured Eurasian ruffe, Gymnocephalus cernuus, release an alarm pheromone that could be used to control their dispersal". Journal of Great Lakes Research. 26 (2): 183–195. Bibcode:2000JGLR...26..183M. doi:10.1016/S0380-1330(00)70685-X.
- Crosier, Danielle M., Molloy, Daniel P., Marsden, J. Ellen. "Ruffe – Gymnocephalus cernuus." New York State Museum. University of Vermont. 23 October 2007.
