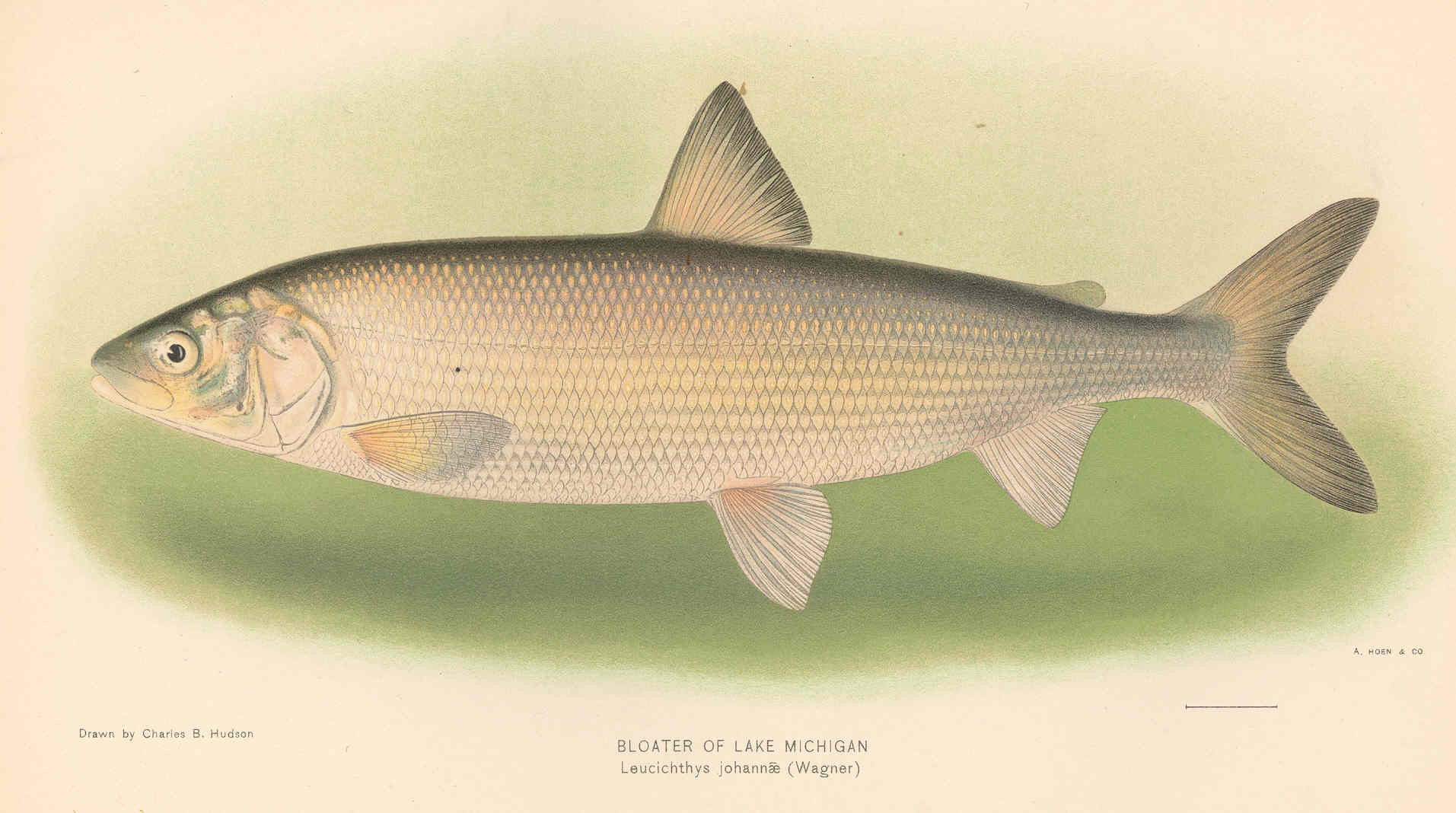

Conservation status
- Extinct (1955) (IUCN 2.3)

Scientific classification
- Kingdom: Animalia
- Phylum: Chordata
- Class: Actinopterygii
- Order: Salmoniformes
- Family: Salmonidae
- Genus: Coregonus
- Species: †C. johannae

Binomial name
- †Coregonus johannae G. Wagner, 1910

= Deepwater cisco =

Species of fish

The deepwater cisco (Coregonus johannae) was one of the largest ciscoes in the Great Lakes. Its average length was 30 cm (12 inches) and it was about 1.0 kilogram (2.2 pounds) in weight. Occurring only in Lakes Huron and Michigan, and inhabiting waters between 50 and 150 metres deep, it was difficult to distinguish from other ciscoes and was possibly the same species as the shortjaw cisco (Coregonus zenithicus). The deepwater cisco was distinguished by usually having fewer than 33 gill rakers, relatively long pectoral fins, and unpigmented jaws. It was a silvery colour with a pink or purple lustre and a green or blue back. It spawned in August and September, earlier than most other ciscoes. Not much is known about its specific behaviors. Its diet consisted of Mysis relicta, fingernail clams, and various aquatic insects. Because of its large size, the deepwater cisco was heavily fished commercially.

The main reasons for its extinction was a combination of competition from the invasive alewife, predation by the introduced sea lamprey, and commercial fishing on the Great Lakes.

== Commercial fishing in 1930s ==
Part of the reason for the lack of information on this species could be attributed to the commercial fishing during the early 1930s, before deep water species were properly analysed. The deepwater cisco was abundant before the 1900s as, before large-scale commercial fishing commenced in Lake Michigan, the larger ciscoes had no natural predators.

It was not until the 1930s that the species was subject to commercial fishing exploitation. The deepwater cisco, also known as chubs in fishing terms, was prized for its larger-than-normal size. During this exploitation, the numbers of this species declined dramatically.

The last deepwater cisco specimens were recorded in Lake Michigan in 1951 and Lake Huron in 1952. The species was declared extinct shortly after. When a re-evaluation was conducted in several states bordering Lake Michigan in the 1960s, there were no identifiable specimens of the deepwater cisco in any of the samplings. This served to confirm its extinction, caused by a combination of commercial fishing and invasive predators such as the sea lamprey.
