= BMERB1 =

Protein-coding gene found in humans

Identifiers
- Aliases: BMERB1, MINP, chromosome 16 open reading frame 45, bMERB domain containing 1, C16orf45
- External IDs: MGI: 1914504; GeneCards: BMERB1

Gene location (Human)
Chr.	Chromosome 16 (human)
Band	16p13.11	Start	15,434,475 bp
Band	16p13.11	End	15,625,028 bp

Gene location (Mouse)
Chr.	Chromosome 16 (mouse)
Band	16|16 A1	Start	13,804,468 bp
Band	16|16 A1	End	13,919,364 bp
RNA expression pattern
Bgee	Human / Mouse (ortholog); Top expressed in: superior frontal gyrus; primary visual cortex; prefrontal cortex; dorsolateral prefrontal cortex; Brodmann area 9; right frontal lobe; anterior cingulate cortex; hippocampus proper; temporal lobe; amygdala / Top expressed in: medial dorsal nucleus; dentate gyrus of hippocampal formation granule cell; visual cortex; medial geniculate nucleus; primary visual cortex; dorsal tegmental nucleus; supraoptic nucleus; dorsomedial hypothalamic nucleus; subiculum; piriform cortex; More reference expression data
BioGPS	n/a
Gene ontology
Molecular function	protein binding
Cellular component	microtubule cytoskeleton
Biological process	negative regulation of microtubule depolymerization; negative regulation of cell motility involved in cerebral cortex radial glia guided migration
Sources:Amigo / QuickGO
Orthologs
Databases	NCBI: entry; OMA: entry
Species	Human	Mouse
Entrez	89927	67254
Ensembl	ENSG00000278823; ENSG00000166780	ENSMUSG00000044117
UniProt	Q96MC5	Q8R1Y2
RefSeq (mRNA)	NM_001142469; NM_033201	NM_144518
RefSeq (protein)	NP_001135941; NP_149978	NP_653101
Location (UCSC)	Chr 16: 15.43 – 15.63 Mb	Chr 16: 13.8 – 13.92 Mb
PubMed search
- Wikidata
View/Edit Human	View/Edit Mouse

bMERB domain containing 1 (or bMERB1) is a gene expressed in humans which has broad expression across the brain. This gene codes for bMERB1 domain-containing protein 1 isoform 1. It is predicted that this gene is involved in actin cytoskeleton regulation, microtubule regulation and glial cell migration.

== Gene ==
Homo sapiens bMERB1 is a protein-coding gene located on Chromosome 16 open reading frame 45 in the cytogenetic band 16p13.11. This gene exists under several aliases, the most common being “MINP” and "c16orf45". bMERB1 spans 2,111 base pairs and contains 6 exons.

== mRNA Transcript ==
Known Transcript Variants
Name	Size (bp)	Protein Length (aa)	Biotype	# of Exons
bMERB1-201	2111	204	protein coding	6
bMERB1-202	1865	187	protein coding	6
bMERB1-209	1854	151	protein coding	5
bMERB1-206	865	175	protein coding	5
bMERB1-203	534	134	protein coding	5
bMERB1-207	497	115	protein coding	5
bMERB1-204	737	88	nonsense mediated decay	6
bMERB1-211	622	36	nonsense mediated decay	5
bMERB1-208	934	no protein	processed transcript	4
bMERB1-205	462	no protein	processed transcript	2
bMERB1-210	546	no protein	retained intron	4

Figure 1. This table describes the 11 splice site variants of the bMERB1 transcript.

== Protein ==
=== Protein Sequence ===
The bMERB1 isoform 1 protein product is composed of 204 amino acids and it is the longest isoform. Isoform 2 is only 187 amino acids long. In the bMERB1 protein, there are two known regions. One such region (DUF3585) has unknown function and spans around 140 amino acids. Much of the DUF region has been conserved across many species going as far back as birds. A much smaller section of this DUF region was found to be conserved as far back as sharks and rays. The other region is considered a “disordered” region and is only about 20 amino acids long.

=== Protein Composition ===
The bMERB1 has a molecular weight of about 24 kilodaltons and has an isoelectronic point of 5.93. There are no positive or negative charge clusters in this sequence. The only repeated amino acid sequence was RLRE, which was only repeated twice. It should also be noted that there are no predicted transmembrane regions in this protein and no hydrophobic regions. bMERB1 can be considered a glycine poor protein.

== Gene Level Regulation ==
=== Expression Pattern ===
NCBI human transcriptome analyses reveal that the bMERB1 gene has moderate to high expression in most tissues of the body. However, bMERB1 expression is significantly highest in the brain. More specifically, bMERB1 expression is highest in the amygdala and the frontal cortex. In conclusion, although this gene is not limited to expression in only one tissue, there is a definite pattern of high expression in brain tissue.

=== Abundance and Localization ===
The bMERB1 protein has a relatively moderate abundance, and this is true across several other species. In studying antibodies to target bMERB1, it was also determined that the protein is expected to be localized in the cytoplasm.

=== Transcription Factors ===
Several transcription factors have been identified to bind to the bMERB1 gene promoter and upstream sequence. It can be noted that a significant number of these transcription factors have known expression patterns in brain tissue. This finding is consistent with the significant bMERB1 gene expression in brain tissue.

== Protein Level Regulation ==
=== Subcellular Localization ===
In a PSORTII analysis of BMERB1, it is predicted that this protein is generally located in the nucleus (47.8%), the cytoplasm (26.1%) and the cytoskeleton (13%).

=== Modifications ===
BMERB1 does not obtain many post-translational modifications. A few modifications are predicted with low confidence, most of which being phosphorylation sites. Although the confidence of these predictions is low, similar results were found using PhosphoSitePlus. Using various DTU Health Tech tools, it was also determined that there are no predicted N-glycosylation or myristylation sites. Along with this, PSORTII reported that this protein contains no motifs or transmembrane regions.

== Homology and Evolution ==
=== Orthologs ===
Genus and species	Common name	Taxonomic group	Estimated Divergence (MYA)	Accession number	Sequence length (aa)	Sequence identity (%) ! !Sequence similarity (%)	
Homo sapiens	Human	Primates	0	NP_149978.1	204	100	100
Aotus nancymaae	Nancy Ma's Night Monkey	Primates	43	XP_012332861.1	234	86.3	86.3
Ochotona princeps	American Pika	Lagomorpha	87	XP_004586852.1	204	95.1	96.6
Mus Musculus	Mouse	Rodentia	90	NP_653101.1	203	95.1	97.1
Canis lupus familiaris	Dog (beagle)	Carnivora	94	XP_038525013	204	97.06	97.1
Ornithorhynchus anatinus	Duck-Billed Platypus	Monotremata	180	XP_001508518.1	204	86.27	92.2
Nothoprocta perdicaria	Chilean Tinamou	Tinamiformes	319	XP_025909891.1	204	87.7	95.1
Gallus gallus	Chicken	Galliformes	319	NP_001264503.1	204	85.29	93.6
Phaethon lepturus	White-Tailed Seabird	Phaethontiformes	319	XP_010280262.1	200	79.41	90.2
Chelonia mydas	Green Sea Turtle	Testudines	319	XP_007058204.1	208	88	93.8
Varanus komodoensis	Komodo Dragon	Squamata	319	XP_044289683.1	207	79.23	90.8
Eleutherodactylus coqui	Puerto Rican Coqui	Anura	353	XP_018419715	210	72.9	84.8
Stegastes partitus	Perch-Like Fish	Perciformes	464	XP_008278140.1	200	68.6	81.6
Chiloscyllium plagiosum	Carpet Shark	Orectolobiformes	464	XP_043568064.1	206	64.08	78.6
Petromyzon marinus	Sea Lamprey	Sea lamprey	615	XP_032832012.1	208	46.1	65.3
Danio rerio	Zebrafish	Actinoptergyii (bony fish)	435	NP_001028910.1	184	54.9	71.1

=== Paralogs ===
There are no paralogs of bMERB1.

=== Mutation Rate of bMERB1 ===
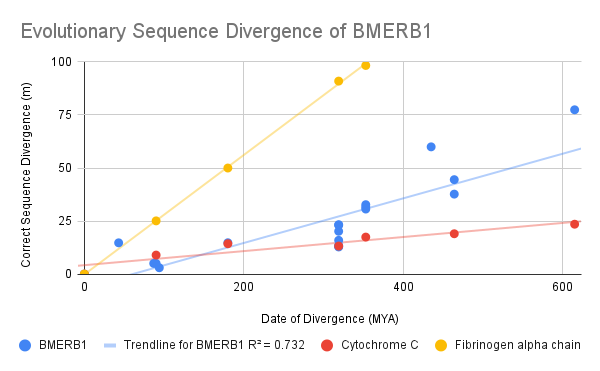

From this graph, it can be noted that the rate of sequence divergence in BMERB1 is between the fast-diverging protein Fibrinogen alpha chain and the slow-diverging Cytochrome C. This would indicate that BMERB1 is not under evolutionary pressure to mutate at an accelerated rate but is also not being prevented from mutating.

== Interacting Proteins ==
Several bMERB1 protein interactions have been identified and their functions also discovered. Generally, the bMERB1 protein interactions have functions likely to be involved in actin cytoskeleton maintenance and microtubule formation/maintenance.

== Clinical Significance ==
No pathogenic genetic mutations have been identified in the bMERB1 sequence.
