= Pygmy smelt =

Scientific classification
- Domain: Eukaryota
- Kingdom: Animalia
- Phylum: Chordata
- Class: Actinopterygii
- Order: Osmeriformes
- Family: Osmeridae
- Genus: Osmerus
- Species: O. spectrum

Binomial name
- Osmerus spectrum Cope, 1870

Species of ray-finned fish

The pygmy smelt (Osmerus spectrum) is a North-American freshwater ray-finned fish in the family Osmeridae. It is found in a number of deep, thermally stratified lakes in eastern Canada and New England (United States).

The pygmy smelt coexists with the rainbow smelt Osmerus mordax, and is distinguished from it by slower growth, earlier maturation, shorter life span, later spawning time, and use of smaller food items.

Genetic data suggest that the pygmy smelt occurrences in each lake have evolved independently from the rainbow smelt lineage, which calls the identity of the pygmy smelt as a species into question. Another, intermediate form of smelt has been identified in Lake Utopia, New Brunswick, which is genetically distinct from local rainbow smelt but is able to hybridize with it. Jelks et al. (2008) consider this pygmy smelt to be a form of O. mordax called the Lake Utopia, New Brunswick dwarf population and deem it "threatened".
