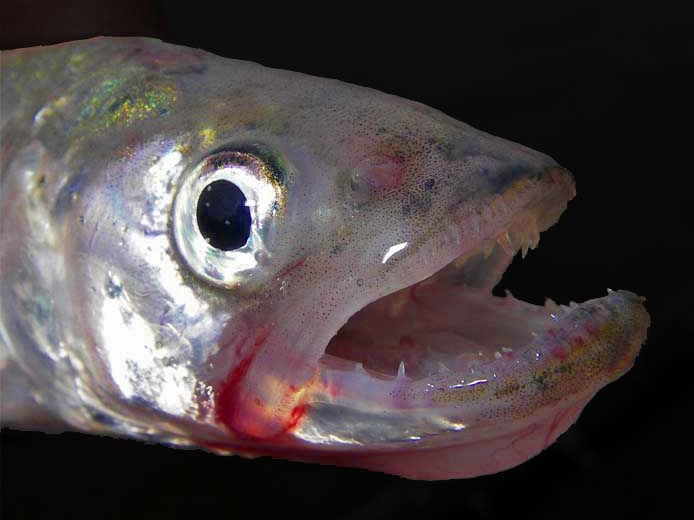

Conservation status
- Least Concern (IUCN 3.1)

Scientific classification
- Kingdom: Animalia
- Phylum: Chordata
- Class: Actinopterygii
- Division: Teleostei
- Order: Osmeriformes
- Family: Osmeridae
- Genus: Osmerus
- Species: O. eperlanus

Binomial name
- Osmerus eperlanus (Linnaeus, 1758)

= European smelt =

Edible species of European fish

The smelt, cucumber smelt, or European smelt (Osmerus eperlanus) is a small species of fish in the family Osmeridae, native to coastal areas in Western Europe. They are a regional specialty in some countries, and are also known as sparling within Scotland.

== Description ==
The body of the European smelt is long and slim with a pointed head, with the dorsal fin behind the pectoral fin. The back of the fish is olive green, and the underside is white. The smelt has a distinctive silver stripe on its flanks. Its length is typically around 13 cm (5.1 in) when it first reaches maturity, and its average length is approximately 16.5 cm (6.5 in). The largest individuals can reach up to 45 cm (17.7 in) in length. They have a distinctive smell, reminiscent of cucumber.

== Distribution and habitat ==
The European smelt inhabits the western coasts of Europe, including the Baltic Sea, living in large lakes and estuaries in various Nordic countries but can be found as far south as the north-west of Spain. Smelt survive best in pelagic areas of oligotrophic lakes, but can inhabit much more polluted habitats, such as the lower Elbe river, and are tolerant of a wide salinity range. Within Scotland, they are found only within the rivers Cree, Forth, and Tay, but were previously recorded in 15 Scottish rivers.

In the Volga River basin, the European smelt is considered a "northern" invasive species that entered the reservoir system from Lake Beloye. However, due to long-term climate warming and changing thermal dynamics, its population has significantly declined, and its range is currently regressing. In the local food web, it has been largely replaced by the invasive Black and Caspian Sea sprat (Clupeonella cultriventris).

== Behaviour and ecology ==
=== Spawning ===
European smelt have both landlocked and anadromous forms. Landlocked individuals spawn in the littoral zone of lakes during the spring, and return to the shore during autumn once the water temperature drops. The anadromous individuals migrate to rivers to spawn on sandy rock bottoms of 3 metres of depth or less. During spawning, cannibalism may occur, especially when both adults and larvae are present in large numbers. The egg count per female on average is over 50,000 eggs per female, and hatching was found to be most successful within low temperature and low salinity waters.

=== Diet ===
European smelt are opportunistic hunters that feed on copepods and cladocerans. As the fish grow, they change their diet from small zooplankton to larger crustaceans, and in rare cases will eat other fish, sometimes of their own species. They also consume the young of vendace.

=== Predators ===
The European smelt is of significant importance within the ecosystems it inhabits, as it is a valuable food source for seabirds. It is also consumed by larger predatory fish including the common bream and European eel. However, the European smelt is a paratenic host of the parasitic Anguillicola crassus, which causes swimbladder lesions within the eels that prey upon them.

== Conservation and threats ==
Smelts are considered a species of Least Concern on the IUCN Red List.

Threats to smelt include dredging within the estuaries they inhabit, barriers to migration, localised overfishing, and deterioration in water quality, typically due to pollution. They are also at risk of unsustainable exploitation due to their use as bait.

Within Scotland, smelts are considered a conservation feature in two of Scotland's Sites of Special Scientific Interest, making them protected under the Wildlife and Countryside Act 1981.

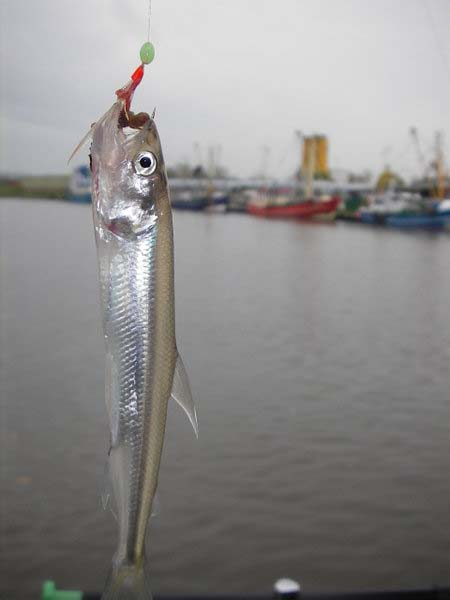
Smelt caught by angling

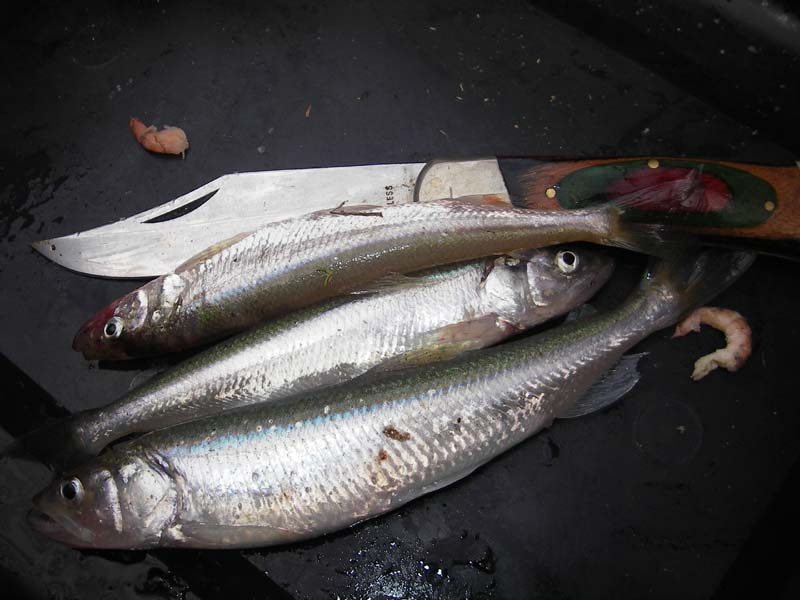
Smelt are about 15–20 cm long

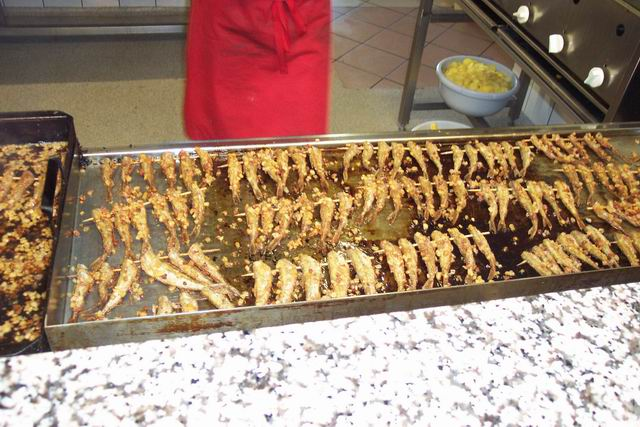
Fried smelt

== Smelt as food ==
=== Commercial aspects ===
Smelt are typically caught with small-scale trawling or inshore nets. They can also be caught by angling with small hooks.

In Sweden, smelt was previously of much more importance as a food fish, and was caught using nets and wooden traps. At this time smelt was often regarded as food for the poor. Due to the pollution of rivers during the 20th century, inland fisheries declined, demand decreased, and it is now of much less significance. However, in neighbouring countries, it is still being exploited commercially, such as in Germany, where water quality has improved, and restaurants have shown more interest in smelt, offering it as a regional and seasonal specialty.

Smelt has also been used as animal feed and fertiliser, and is currently also sold as dry dog food.

=== Regional culinary aspects ===
Smelt is an important food fish in many European countries, as the bones do not need to be removed during preparation due to their softness; the fish can simply be cooked and eaten whole, and the head does not need to be removed. The fish is typically fried in margarine or butter, and it is considered a regional delicacy in parts of Germany and Russia, along with parts of eastern Europe. Sometimes the smelt is soaked in milk and rolled in flour before frying. Deep-frying is also another common cooking method, although smelt is sometimes also boiled, smoked, pickled, or prepared au gratin. The fish is typically served with lemon, parsley, and potatoes.

In northern Germany, the fish is coated in rye flour and then fried in butter and bacon. It is served with fried potatoes, potato salad, and applesauce.

A traditional dish in Sweden is slompannkaka or 'smelt pancake', particularly in the provinces of Värmland and Södermanland. This may be an actual pancake using the fried fish and batter, or in other cases it may just be fish filling up the frying pan, sometimes with an added egg custard.

== See also ==
- Smelts
