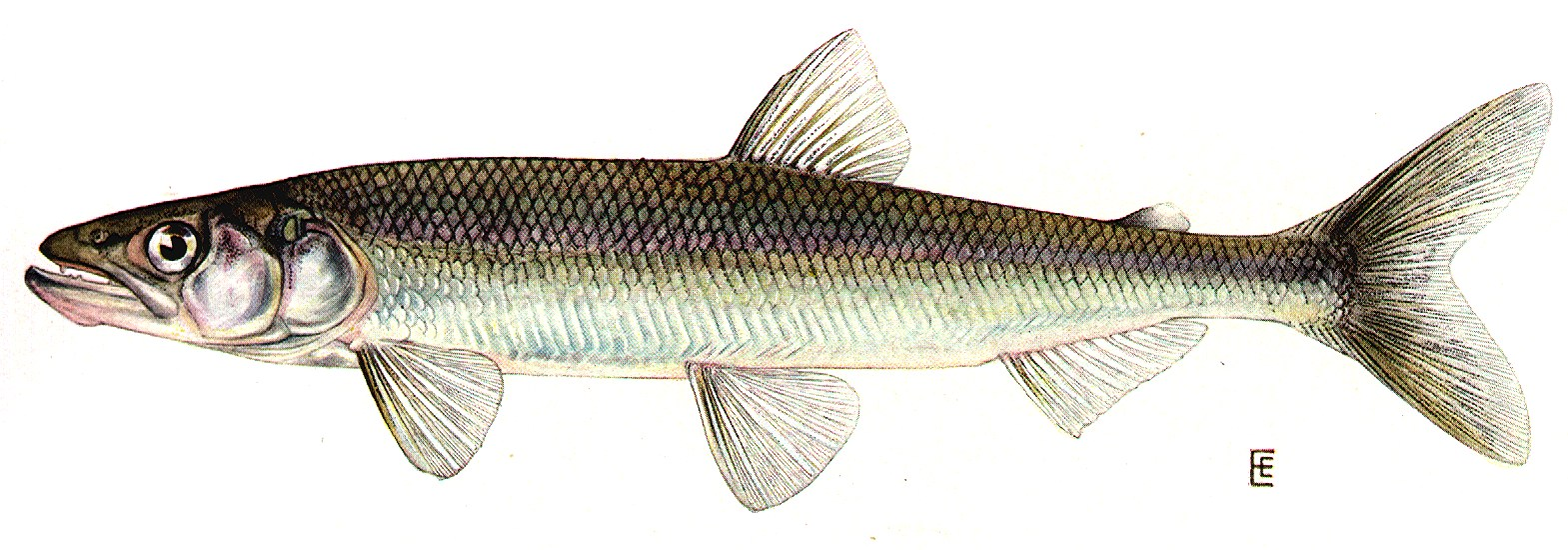

Conservation status
- Least Concern (IUCN 3.1)

Scientific classification
- Kingdom: Animalia
- Phylum: Chordata
- Class: Actinopterygii
- Division: Teleostei
- Order: Osmeriformes
- Family: Osmeridae
- Genus: Osmerus
- Species: O. mordax

Binomial name
- Osmerus mordax (Mitchill, 1814)

Subspecies
- Osmerus mordax mordax (Mitchill, 1814); Osmerus mordax dentex Steindachner & Kner, 1870

= Rainbow smelt =

Species of fish

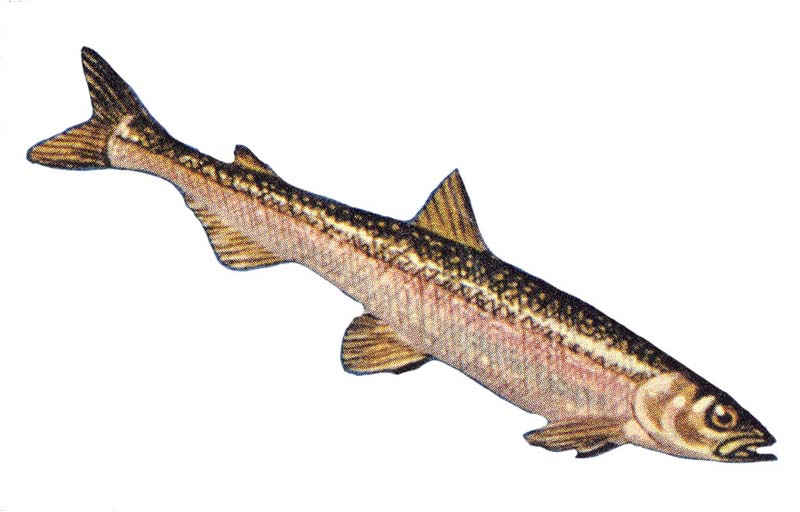
Rainbow smelt

The rainbow smelt (Osmerus mordax) is a North American species of fish of the family Osmeridae. Walleye, trout, and other larger fish prey on these smelt. The rainbow smelt prefer juvenile ciscoes, zooplankton such as calanoid copepods (Leptodiaptomus ashlandi, L. minutus, L. sicilis), and other small organisms, but are aggressive and will eat almost any fish they find. They are anadromous spring spawners and prefer clean streams with light flow and light siltation. The rainbow smelt face several barriers. They are weak swimmers and struggle to navigate fish ladders preventing them from making it past dams to the headwater streams where they spawn. The rise in erosion and dams helped to decimate the smelt population in the 1980s. There are currently plans to try to reduce damming and to help control erosion.

== Description ==
The body of the rainbow smelt is slender and cylindrical. It has a silvery, pale green back and is iridescent purple, blue, and pink on the sides, with a light underside. When full grown, the rainbow smelt is between 7 and 9 inches (18 and 23 cm) long and weighs about 3 ounces (85 g). Individuals over 12 inches (30 cm) long are known.

== Distribution and habitat ==
The rainbow smelt is widespread across North American watersheds. The North American native range of the rainbow smelt extends through the Atlantic drainages between New Jersey and Labrador to Arctic drainages, and the Pacific drainages as far south as Vancouver Island. The rainbow smelt has been introduced into water bodies in the U.S. states of Colorado, Connecticut, Georgia, Idaho, Illinois, Indiana, Iowa, Kansas, Kentucky, Louisiana, Maine, Maryland, Massachusetts, Michigan, Minnesota, Missouri, Montana, Nebraska, New Hampshire, New York, North Carolina, North Dakota, Ohio, Pennsylvania, South Dakota, Tennessee, Vermont, Virginia, and Wisconsin.

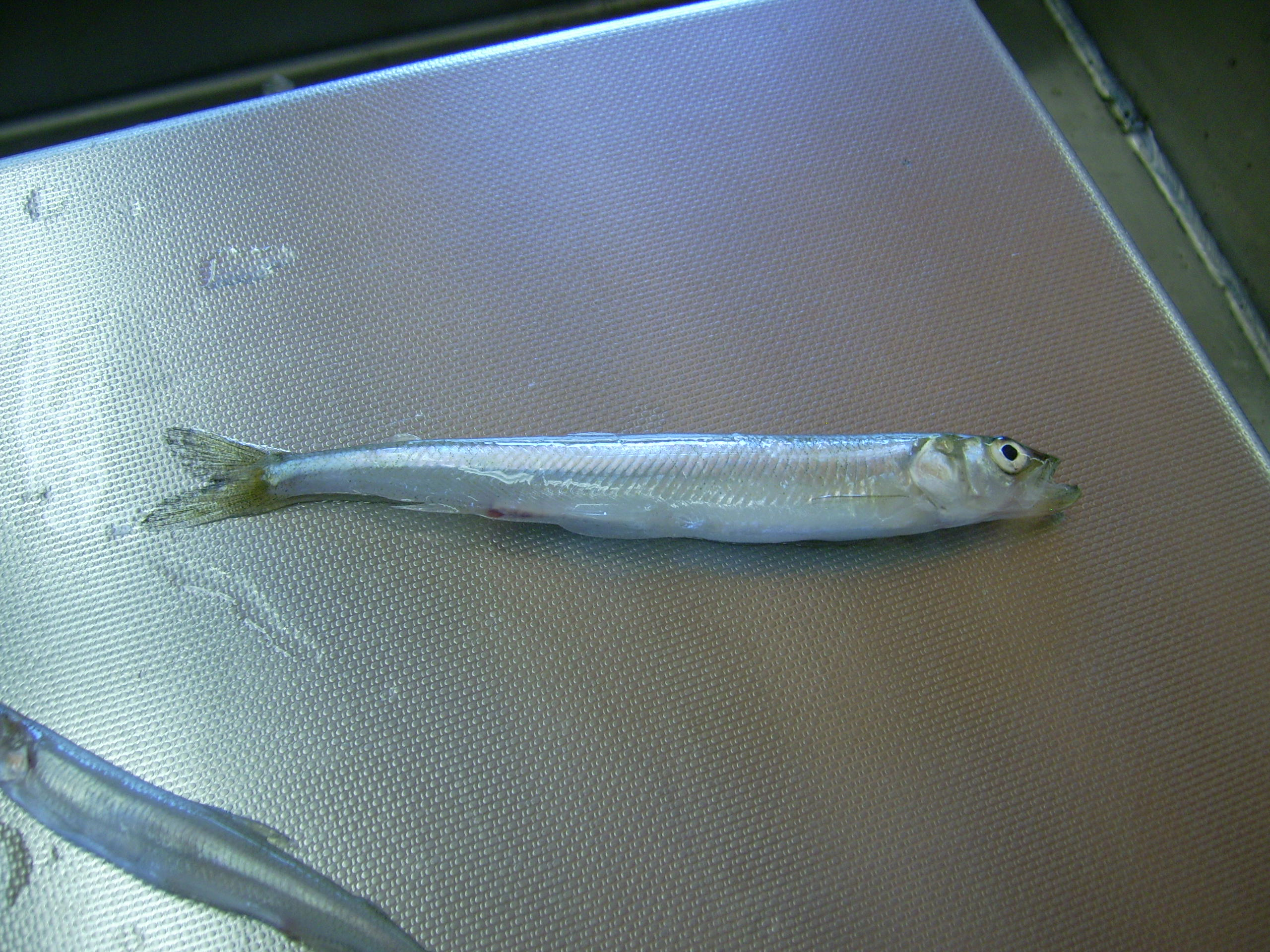
Lake Superior-caught rainbow smelt

Rainbow smelt invaded the Great Lakes watershed through the intentional introduction of eggs from historically known landlocked populations in Maine to Crystal Lake, Michigan in 1912. This lake drains into Lake Michigan, from which fish escaped into Lake Michigan and spread quickly throughout the Great Lakes and their tributaries. Early records documenting the smelt's range expansion in the Great Lakes include Lake Michigan, Lake Erie, Lake Huron, Lake Ontario, and Lake Superior. Rainbow smelt were first reported from Lake Ontario in 1929, and probably reached it by dispersal along natural waterways from the Finger Lakes, New York, where they were intentionally introduced in 1917. The ability of rainbow smelt to disperse is determined by the connectivity of lakes, the ability of smelt to move through connecting streams, and the suitability of connected lakes as habitat. Rainbow smelt are weak swimmers so they cannot make it over fish ladders. This has helped to prevent an even wider spread of their range.

Rainbow smelt occur in rivers, coastal areas and ponds. In their anadromous territories, they spend the summers along the coast, normally in waters no more than 20 feet (6.1 m) deep and no more than 1 mile (1.6 km) from shore. They overwinter under the ice in estuaries, producing an antifreeze protein and glycerol. In the spring, they spawn at night in small streams, often ones that go dry in the summer.

== Ecology ==
In 1883 Stedman and Argyle found that the rainbow smelt consumed bloaters (Coregonus hoyi) and alewives (Alosa pseudoharengus). However, they also stated that this predator had not affected the population of bloaters but that impact could be a possibility. A 2003 study by Horppila et al. shows that smelt densities can exceed 40,000 individuals per hectare and may create a large predation pressure on the lake. Horppila et al. also states that a single smelt can consume between 0.12 and 0.14 grams food wet weight per day. Another study showed that in Lake Ontario the primary food sources for rainbow smelt were slimy sculpins (Cottus cognatus) and opossum shrimp (Mysis relicta), but nothing was said on whether this predation had significant impact on the populations. In 1973 Havey reported that there was increased growth in landlocked Atlantic salmon populations after the introduction of the smelt. It was also shown by Brandt and Madon in 1986 that adult lake trout (Salvelinus namaycush) could be a keystone predator species for the smelt. Hrabik et al. (1998) found evidence of competition for food between introduced rainbow smelt and native yellow perch (Perca flavescens) in Wisconsin lake habitats, and smelt may be partially responsible for the decline of Great Lakes whitefish (Coregonus spp.). The U.S. EPA stated in 2008 that they believe the smelt contributed to the extinction of the blue pike (Stizostedion vitreum glaucum) by outcompeting for food. Acidity may alter smelt distributions because they were not found in small lakes with pH less than 6.0 in several surveys. Because of snowmelt, rainbow smelt eggs might be exposed to lethal pH decreases in poorly buffered lakes.

== Life history ==
Rainbow smelt are anadromous, ascending from saltwater to freshwater to spawn. Smelt are also capable of completing their life history exclusively in freshwater. Landlocked adult rainbow smelt spawn shortly after ice-off at night in the lower reaches of streams. Shaw found in his research that no shoreline spawning had ever occurred. McKenzie states that the number of eggs extruded by a female is positively related to its size and Nellbring stated in his 1989 research that the eggs are adhesive and attach to substrates such as gravel, sand, mud, or submerged vegetation. Eggs are left unattended and hatch in 1–4 weeks, depending on water temperature. The time to sexual maturity is dependent on food supply and water temperature and abundant food and warmer temperatures encourage faster growth. Crossman and Scott state that in optimal conditions and large lakes, rainbow smelt may reach 35.6 centimetres (14.0 in) and can live for over seven years.

== Fishing ==
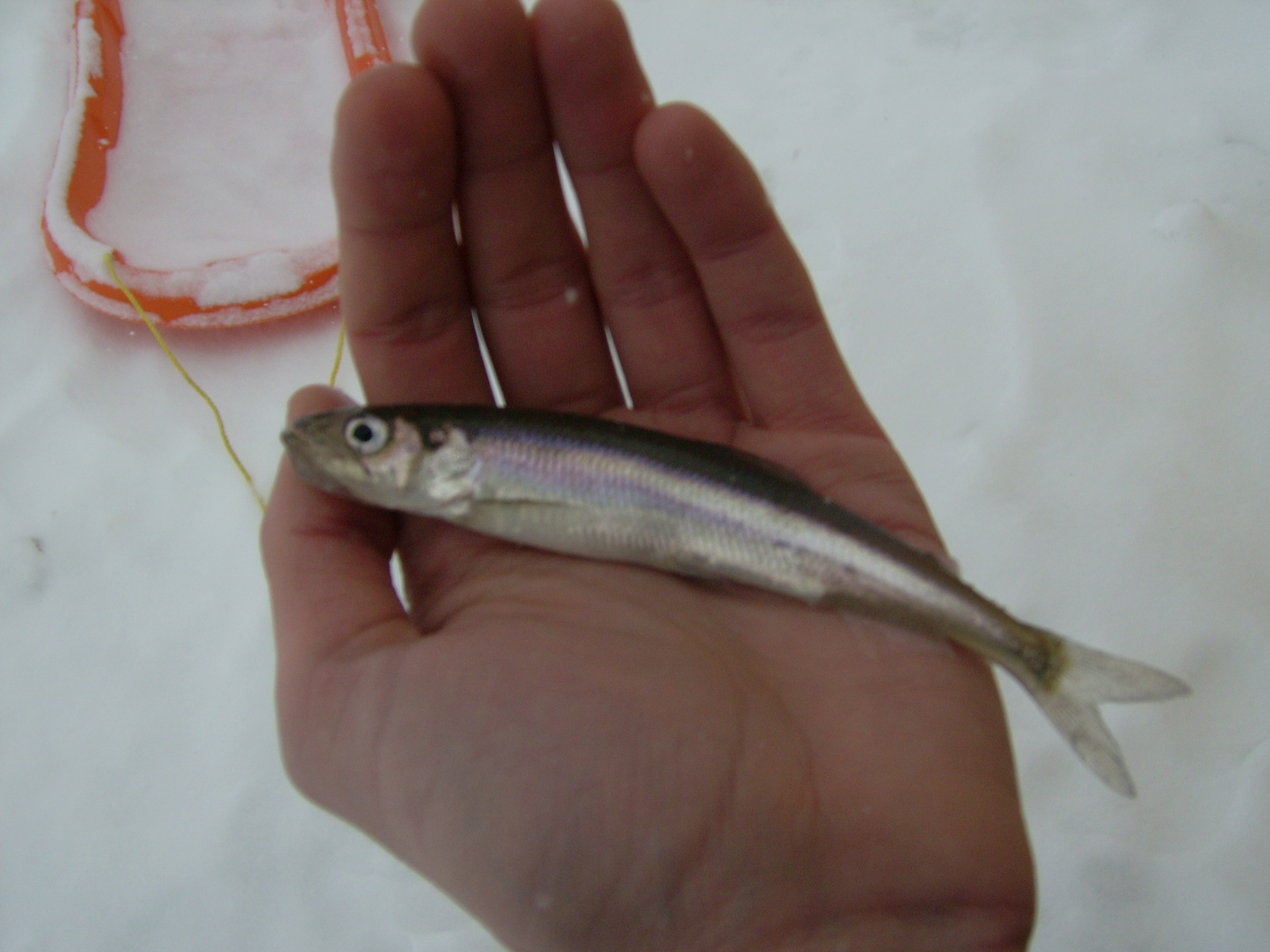
Ice fishing for rainbow smelts

Rainbow smelt are fished both commercially and for sport. Commercial harvests are down from historic levels; for example around 1880 an annual harvest from the Charles River alone was around 9 million fish, while today few smelt are found in the Charles River. They are commonly processed into animal feed, but are also eaten by humans. They are a popular winter game fish and the spring smelt run is a tradition in many parts of their distribution. Fishing for rainbow smelt using a gill net has historically been a popular activity along the City of Chicago's lakefront.

== Management ==
The populations of the rainbow smelt in areas where it has been introduced, such as the Great Lakes, have been increasing in many regions, even with efforts to control its spread. Several things are being done to manage this species. Massive fish removal by over-fishing reduced the rainbow smelt populations in some lakes by the 1980s. Some people are taking a chemical approach to this growing problem, using Rotenone. While this is effective, it also harms other organisms and is unpopular with the public.

The rainbow smelt is a U.S. National Marine Fisheries Service Species of Concern, one of those species about which the U.S. Government's National Oceanic and Atmospheric Administration has some concerns regarding status and threats, but for which insufficient information is available to indicate a need to list the species under the U.S. Endangered Species Act (ESA).

== See also ==
- Smelt (fish)
- Pacific rainbow smelt

== Other references ==
- Burroughs, Frank (August 2006). "The Microfishery". Confluence: Merrymeeting Bay. Gardiner, Maine: Tilbury House. pp. 39–46. ISBN 978-0-88448-282-6.
