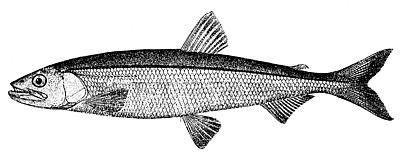

Conservation status
- Least Concern (IUCN 3.1)

Scientific classification
- Kingdom: Animalia
- Phylum: Chordata
- Class: Actinopterygii
- Order: Osmeriformes
- Family: Osmeridae
- Genus: Osmerus
- Species: O. dentex

Binomial name
- Osmerus dentex Steindachner & Kner, 1870

= Pacific rainbow smelt =

Species of fish

The Pacific rainbow smelt (Osmerus dentex), also known as the Arctic rainbow smelt or cucumber fish in Japan, is a North Pacific species of fish of the family Osmeridae. The fish usually lives in marine and brackish environment, with a wide distribution from North Korea, Sea of Okhotsk to Bering Sea and British Columbia. They are also seen in estuaries and coastal waters of European and Siberian shores of Arctic Ocean from White Sea to Chukota in Russian Far East.

== Description ==
The Pacific rainbow smelt has a cylindrical elongated body shape, with lengths ranging between 14 and 16 centimetres (5.5 and 6.3 in). The body color is mostly silver. They usually prey on plankton and squid.

== Life cycle ==
Pacific rainbow smelt usually return to their natal streams to spawn when the water temperature reaches 2 degree Celsius and above, but the degree of homing varies from one population to another and may be genetically controlled. Movement to spawning grounds are usually made at night when the spawning group crowd together and move upstream. The whole spawning usually lasts several hours each night for several nights. Many spawned-out fish, especially males, die after spawning, but those that survive would spawn again in the following year.

== See also ==
- Smelt (fish)
- Rainbow smelt
