= Piscicide =

Poison for fish

A piscicide is a chemical substance which is poisonous to fish. The primary use for piscicides is to eliminate a dominant species of fish in a body of water, as the first step in attempting to populate the body of water with a different fish. They are also used to combat parasitic and invasive species of fish.

Examples of piscicides include rotenone, saponins, TFM, niclosamide and Antimycin A (Fintrol).

== Plant-based piscicides ==
Historically, fishing techniques of indigenous people around the world have frequently included the use of plant-based piscicides. Many of these plants are natural sources of rotenone and saponins.

The genera Tephrosia, Wikstroemia, and Barringtonia are well known as fish poisons.

== See also ==
- Cyanide fishing
- Environmental impact of pesticides § Aquatic life
