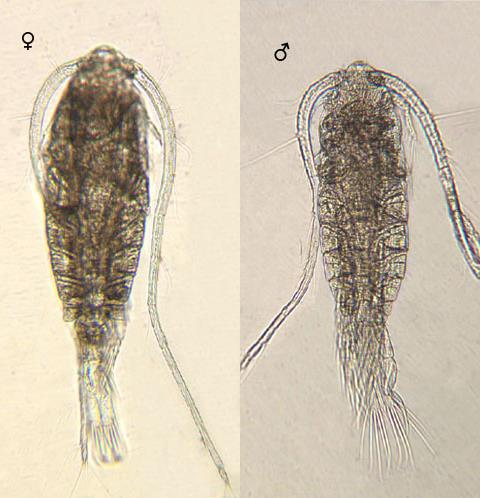
- Leptodiaptomus minutus

Scientific classification
- Domain: Eukaryota
- Kingdom: Animalia
- Phylum: Arthropoda
- Class: Copepoda
- Order: Calanoida
- Family: Diaptomidae
- Genus: Leptodiaptomus; Light, 1938

= Leptodiaptomus =

Genus of crustaceans

Leptodiaptomus is a genus of copepods belonging to the family Diaptomidae.

The species of this genus are found in Northern America.

== Species ==
The genus contains the following species:

- Leptodiaptomus angustilobus (Sars G.O., 1898)
- Leptodiaptomus ashlandi (Marsh, 1893)
- Leptodiaptomus coloradensis (Marsh, 1911)
- Leptodiaptomus connexus Light, 1938
- Leptodiaptomus cuauhtemoci (Osorio-Tafall, 1941)
- Leptodiaptomus dodsoni Elías-Gutiérrez, Suárez-Morales & Romano-Márquez, 1999
- Leptodiaptomus insularis (Kincaid, 1956)
- Leptodiaptomus judayi (Marsh, 1907)
- Leptodiaptomus mexicanus (Marsh, 1929)
- Leptodiaptomus minutus (Lilljeborg in Guerne & Richard, 1889)
- Leptodiaptomus moorei Wilson M.S., 1954
- Leptodiaptomus natriophilus Light, 1938
- Leptodiaptomus novamexicanus (Herrick, 1895)
- Leptodiaptomus nudus (Lilljeborg in Guerne & Richard, 1889)
- Leptodiaptomus sicilis (Forbes S.A., 1882)
- Leptodiaptomus siciloides (Lilljeborg in Guerne & Richard, 1889)
- Leptodiaptomus signicauda (Lilljeborg in Guerne & Richard, 1889)
- Leptodiaptomus spinicornis Light, 1938
- Leptodiaptomus tenuicaudatus (Marsh, 1903)
- Leptodiaptomus trybomi Lilljeborg in: Guerne & Richard, 1889
- Leptodiaptomus tyrrelli (Poppe, 1888)
