= Longjaw cisco =

Conservation status
- Extinct (1978) (IUCN 2.3)

- Extinct (1978) (ESA)

Scientific classification
- Kingdom: Animalia
- Phylum: Chordata
- Class: Actinopterygii
- Order: Salmoniformes
- Family: Salmonidae
- Genus: Coregonus
- Species: †C. alpenae

Binomial name
- †Coregonus alpenae Koelz, 1924

Extinct species of fish

The longjaw cisco (Coregonus alpenae) was a deep-water cisco or chub, usually caught at depths of 100 metres (328 ft) or more from Lakes Huron, Michigan, and Erie. Its Latin name was derived from Alpena, a city in Michigan. Silver colored and growing to a maximum length of about 30 centimeters (12 inches) long, the extinction of longjaw cisco was a result of overfishing, pollution of the Great Lakes and the disruption of Great Lakes food chains after the introduction of the sea lamprey.

The systematics of the group of fishes called "ciscoes" is complicated and scientists now generally believe that the longjaw cisco was not a separate species, but a distinctive population of large-bodied individuals of shortjaw cisco (Coregonus zenithicus).

The deepwater cisco fishery caught longjaw ciscoes and sold them as "smoked herring". The commercial catch peaked around the 1930s when about one-third of the catch of ciscoes was this species.

No individuals have been reported in commercial fish catches since 1967, and in Ontario the last individual was recorded from Georgian Bay in 1975.
