= Kiyi =

Conservation status
- Vulnerable (IUCN 3.1)

Scientific classification
- Kingdom: Animalia
- Phylum: Chordata
- Class: Actinopterygii
- Order: Salmoniformes
- Family: Salmonidae
- Genus: Coregonus
- Species: C. kiyi

Binomial name
- Coregonus kiyi (Koelz, 1921)

Species of fish

The kiyi (Coregonus kiyi) is a species of freshwater whitefish, a deepwater cisco, endemic to the Great Lakes of North America. It previously inhabited Lake Superior, Lake Michigan, Lake Huron and Lake Ontario, but is now believed to persist only in Lake Superior where it is common. The various deepwater ciscos are also called chubs (not to be confused with the various species of Cyprinidae also called chubs). The kiyi is part of the large group of related northern ciscos known as the Coregonus artedi complex.

== Description ==
The kiyi is one of the smaller ciscos. Adult kiyi average approximately 250 millimetres (9.8 in) in total length and 170 grams (6.0 oz) in weight. Individuals can reach more than 280 millimetres (11 in). They are silvery pink or purple iridescence, darker on the back and white on the belly. They may have a dark tip on the lower jaw. They have a large head and a conspicuous, large eye.

== Subspecies ==
Two subspecies of kiyi have been recognised based on morphological characteristics and distribution. The nominate subspecies Coregonus kiyi kiyi, or the Upper Great Lakes kiyi, was found in Lakes Superior, Huron and Michigan. The Lake Ontario kiyi, C. k. orientalis, was only found in Lake Ontario. However, recent examination of the ciscos as a group using genetic techniques has suggested that some recognized species are not genetically distinct from others, and it has been suggested that the deepwater ciscos in general may be forms of the northern cisco C. artedi adapted to life in different ecological niches. The distinction between the subspecies of kiyi has been rendered academic, however, by the extinction of the Lake Ontario form, which has not been seen since the 1960s and has been extinct since 2005. The subspecies was driven to extinction by commercial exploitation, predation and competition by introduced species.

== Ecology and behavior ==
The kiyi is reportedly most abundant at depths greater than 80 metres (260 ft) over its range, with Lake Superior kiyi said to be abundant at depths of 180 metres (590 ft).

Females are known to grow larger and live longer (10 years) than males (8 years). Age at maturity is believed to be 2 to 3 years. The minimum size at maturity is reported as 132 millimetres (5.2 in) in Lake Superior. Spawning takes place in autumn or early winter, and has been reported in depths of 106–165 metres (348–541 ft). Ciscoes are known to exhibit large fluctuations in reproductive success and will produce several years of strong year classes followed by several years of poor reproductive success.

Although not the preferred chub species owing to their relatively small size, kiyi were a substantial component of the Great Lakes chub fisheries at one time, particularly in Lake Ontario. They, along with other deepwater chubs, have been negatively affected by a combination of factors, including the invasion of the Great Lakes by several non-native species that prey on various life stages of the chubs or compete with them. Parasitic sea lamprey (Petromyzon marinus), alewife (Alosa pseudoharengus) and rainbow smelt (Osmerus mordax), in particular, have been implicated in their demise, and are believed to have stressed populations to the extent that previously sustainable levels of exploitation became unsustainable.
