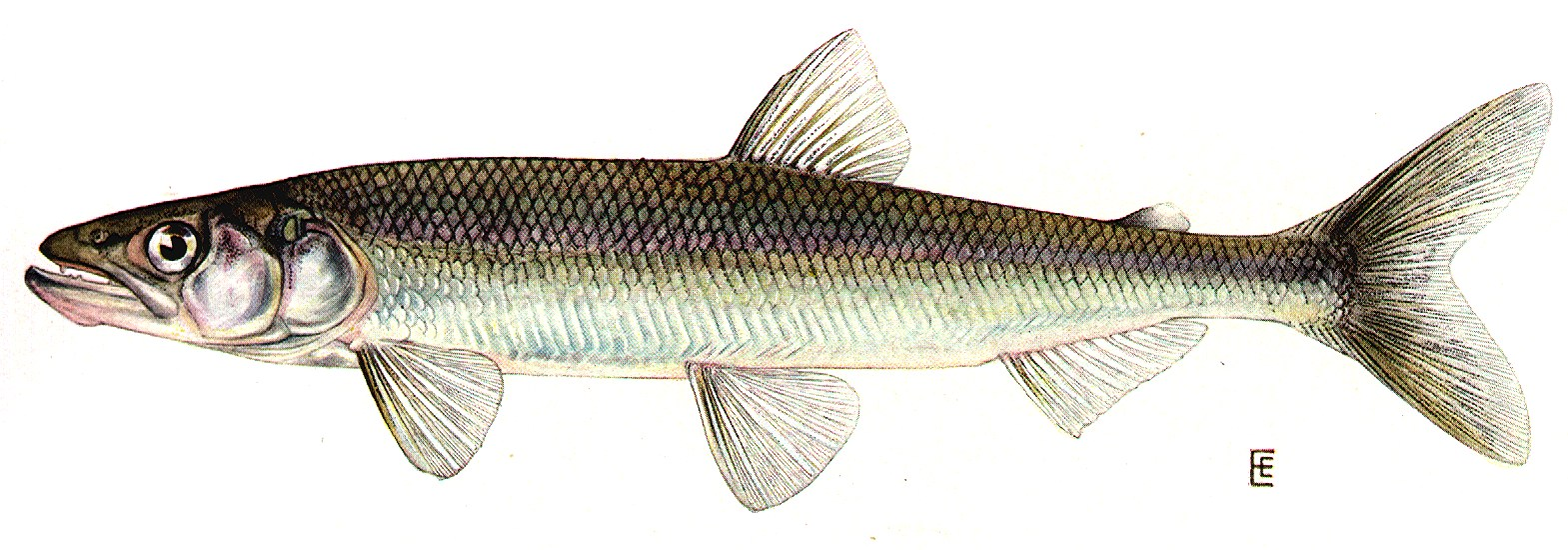
- Osmerus mordax

Scientific classification
- Kingdom: Animalia
- Phylum: Chordata
- Class: Actinopterygii
- Division: Teleostei
- Order: Osmeriformes
- Family: Osmeridae
- Genus: Osmerus; Linnaeus, 1758

Synonyms
- Salmo (Osmerus) Linnaeus, 1758; Osmerus Forskal, 1775; Osmerus Lacepède, 1803; Eperlanus Valenciennes in Gaimard, 1851

= Osmerus =

Osmerus Temporal range: Thanetian to Present

Genus of fishes

Osmerus /ɒsˈmɪərəs/ is a genus of smelt.

== Species ==
There are currently three recognized species in this genus:

- Osmerus dentex (Steindachner & Kner, 1870) (Pacific rainbow smelt)
- Osmerus eperlanus (Linnaeus, 1758) (European smelt)
- Osmerus mordax (Mitchill, 1814)
  - Osmerus mordax dentex Steindachner & Kner, 1870 (Arctic rainbow smelt)
  - Osmerus mordax mordax (Mitchill, 1814) (Rainbow smelt)

The Pygmy smelt Osmerus spectrum described by Edward Drinker Cope in 1870 is a synonym of O. mordax.

Fossil species

- Osmerus albyi Sauvage, 1870 (Messinian of Italy)
- Osmerus glarisianus Agassiz, 1842 (Oligocene of Czechia & Romania)
- Osmerus larteti Sauvage, 1870 (Messinian of Italy)
- Osmerus propterygius Sauvage, 1870 (Messinian of Italy)
- Osmerus stilpnos Sauvage, 1870 (Messinian of Italy)
