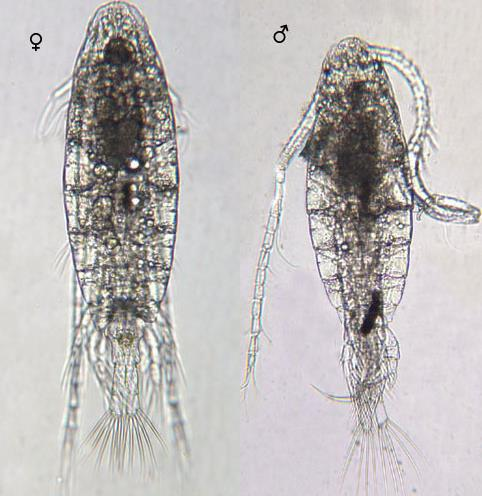
- Female and male L. ashlandi

Scientific classification
- Kingdom: Animalia
- Phylum: Arthropoda
- Class: Copepoda
- Order: Calanoida
- Family: Diaptomidae
- Genus: Leptodiaptomus
- Species: L. ashlandi

Binomial name
- Leptodiaptomus ashlandi (Marsh, 1893)

= Leptodiaptomus ashlandi =

Species of crustacean

Leptodiaptomus ashlandi is a calanoid copepod zooplankton native to the Laurentian Great Lakes and their basin.

== Distribution ==
Leptodiaptomus ashlandi is a zooplankton species widely distributed across Canada and the northern half of the United States in large deep lakes. It occurs in all the Great Lakes.

== Morphology ==
Adult females of L. ashlandi can be distinguished by their two-segmented urosome and asymmetrical, rounded metasomal wings. Males are characterized by a large lateral spine on leg 5, located in the proximal third of the terminal segment, and by the presence of a slender process on the third segment from the distal end of the right antennule. This species is morphologically similar to other leptodiaptomids (Leptodiaptomus minutus, L. sicilis) and skistodiaptomids (Skistodiaptomus oregonensis).

== Ecology ==
Leptodiaptomus ashlandi are known prey items for a number of native and non-native Great Lakes fishes. They are also prey items for other invertebrate zooplankton. Remains have been found within gut-contents of Mysis diluviana and are trophically below Limnocalanus macrurus.
