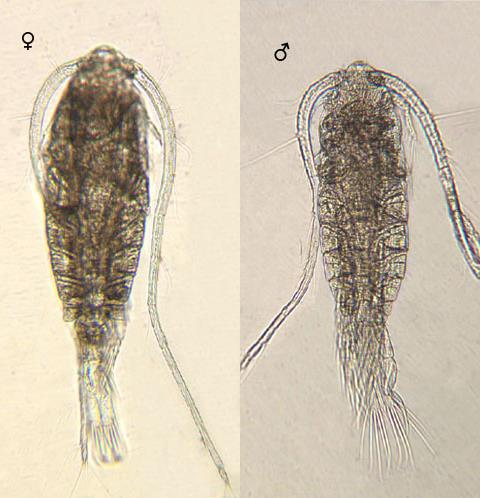
- Female and male L. minutus

Scientific classification
- Kingdom: Animalia
- Phylum: Arthropoda
- Class: Copepoda
- Order: Calanoida
- Family: Diaptomidae
- Genus: Leptodiaptomus
- Species: L. minutus

Binomial name
- Leptodiaptomus minutus (Lilljeborg in Guerne & Richard, 1889)

= Leptodiaptomus minutus =

Species of crustacean

Leptodiaptomus ashlandi is a calanoid copepod zooplankton.

== Distribution ==
Leptodiaptomus minutus is found over most of North America north of the 40th parallel and in Greenland and Iceland. It may extend further south in mountainous areas of the East, but appears to be absent from the far western United States. It is found in all the Great Lakes and is particularly abundant in Lake Huron and Lake Michigan

== Morphology ==
Leptodiaptomus minutus adult females are characterized by a two-segmented urosome, metasomal wings that are nearly symmetrical and rounded, and endopods of leg 5 are greatly reduced in size. In adult males, the small lateral spine on the terminal segment of leg 5 is located in the proximal third of the segment, and the right (geniculate) antennule has a slender process on the third to the last segment. This species is the smallest calanoid in the Great Lakes, only Leptodiaptomus ashlandi may overlap its size range. One might determine that the lateral spine on leg 5 of L. minutus is located more in the middle portion of the terminal segment. However, the size of the spine (less than half the width of the exopod terminal segment) would not allow its confusion with Onychodiaptomus sanguineus, Leptodiaptomus sicilis, or Leptodiaptomus siciloides, where the spine is at least as long as the width of the segment. These species are physically similar to other leptodiaptomids (Leptodiaptomus ashlandi, Leptodiaptomus sicilis and skistodiaptomids (Skistodiaptomus oregonensis).

== Ecology ==
Leptodiaptomus minutus are known prey items for a number of native and non-native Great Lakes fishes. They are also prey items for other invertebrate zooplankton. Remains have been found within gut-contents of Mysis diluviana and are trophically below Limnocalanus macrurus.
