= TFM (piscicide) =

Names
- Preferred IUPAC name 4-Nitro-3-(trifluoromethyl)phenol

Identifiers
CAS Number	88-30-2
3D model (JSmol)	Interactive image
ChemSpider	6665
ECHA InfoCard	100.001.653
PubChem CID	6931
UNII	96W52A3IFS
CompTox Dashboard (EPA)	DTXSID7021788
- InChI: InChI=1S/C7H4F3NO3/c8-7(9,10)5-3-4(12)1-2-6(5)11(13)14/h1-3,12H Key: ZEFMBAFMCSYJOO-UHFFFAOYSA-N
- SMILES: O=[N+]([O-])c1c(cc(O)cc1)C(F)(F)F

Properties
Chemical formula	C_{7}H_{4}F_{3}NO_{3}
Molar mass	207.108 g·mol^{−1}
- Except where otherwise noted, data are given for materials in their standard state (at 25 °C [77 °F], 100 kPa). verify (what is ?) Infobox references

TFM (3-trifluoromethyl-4-nitrophenol) is a common piscicide, i.e., a fish poison used to combat parasitic and invasive species of fish.

The substance was discovered in 1958 when researching means to combat sea lampreys and it currently remains the primary lampricide (lamprey-killer) in the Great Lakes area.

TFM toxicity has not been thoroughly investigated for humans, but is considered an irritant, respiratory irritant, and toxic by the manufacturer. Toxicity studies of other mammals have generally found it to be non-toxic at concentrations expected to be found in treated areas. Impact on other fish species may be controlled by selective application during the larvae season for lampreys and other management of its concentration. TFM does not accumulate, since it breaks down within several days.
