= Lampricide =

Class of pesiticides used to control lampreys

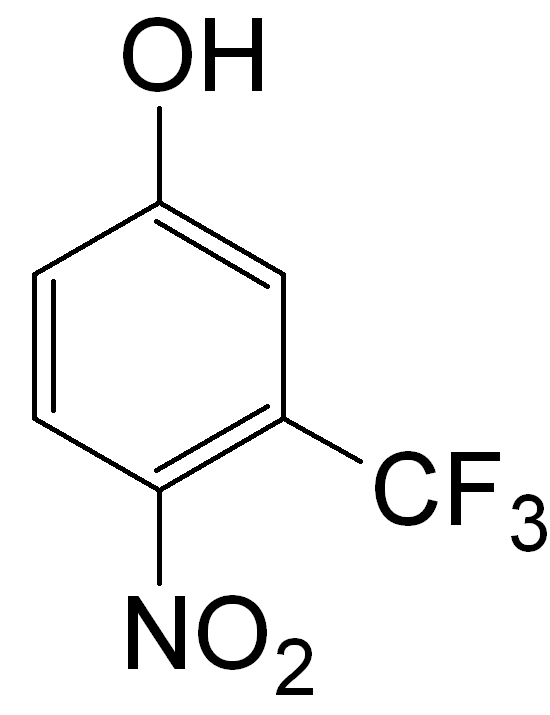
Chemical structure of 3-trifluoromethyl-4-nitrophenol (TFM), a common lampricide

A lampricide is any chemical designed to target the larvae of lampreys in river systems before they develop into parasitic adults. One lampricide is used in the headwaters of Lake Champlain and the Great Lakes to control the sea lamprey (Petromyzon marinus), an invasive species to these lakes.

TFM (3-trifluoromethyl-4-nitrophenol) is the main chemical used for this purpose. As it is hydrophobic, it passes through biological membranes.

TFM is a metabolic uncoupler—that is, TFM separates the electron transport chain from ATP synthesis, resulting in the failure of the aerobic respiration process. It accomplishes this by disrupting the electrochemical gradient that powers ATP synthase—as an acid, it donates H+ ions to the mitochondrial matrix. The electron transport chain is not affected and continues using oxygen, without producing ATP.

While the general opinion is that TFM typically does not harm other fish (due to the relationship between true fish and lampreys), lampricide can be problematic for many amphibians, such as mudpuppies (genus Necturus) which often share the same habitats. Also, some more "primitive" species of fish, such as the sturgeon in the Great Lakes are sensitive to chemicals such as TFM.
