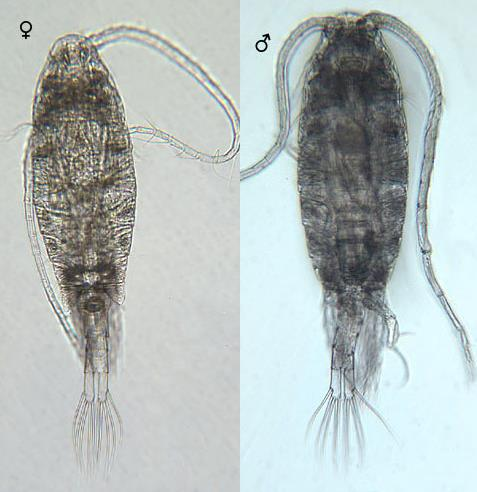
- Female and male L. sicilis

Scientific classification
- Kingdom: Animalia
- Phylum: Arthropoda
- Class: Copepoda
- Order: Calanoida
- Family: Diaptomidae
- Genus: Leptodiaptomus
- Species: L. sicilis

Binomial name
- Leptodiaptomus sicilis (S.A. Forbes, 1882)

= Leptodiaptomus sicilis =

Species of crustacean

Leptodiaptomus sicilis is a calanoid copepod native to the Laurentian Great Lakes and its basin.

== Distribution ==
The species is found all over North America, north of Missouri, in fresh and saline waters. It is found in all the Great Lakes but is most abundant in Lake Superior.

== Morphology ==
Leptodiaptomus sicilis adult females are distinguished by their three-segmented urosome; pointed, triangular metasomal wings with minute sensilla; and the genital segment without obvious lateral projections. In the mature male, the right exopod lateral spine of leg 5 is located in the middle of the segment, is quite long, and projects almost perpendicularly to the segment. In addition, the projections on the left exopod terminal segment are short, blunt, and well-separated. The right antennule on the male has a long, slender process coming off the terminal end of the third segment from the distal end and the metasomal wings are expanded and triangular in shape. These species are physically similar to other leptodiaptomids (Leptodiaptomus ashlandi, Leptodiaptomus minutus and skistodiaptomids (Skistodiaptomus oregonensis).

== Ecology ==
Leptodiaptomus sicilis are known prey items for a number of native and non-native Great Lakes fishes. They are also prey items for other invertebrate zooplankton. Remains have been found within gut-contents of Mysis diluviana and are trophically below Limnocalanus macrurus while also primarily a herbivore.
