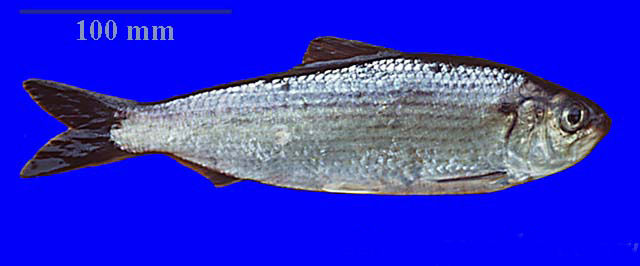

Conservation status
- Least Concern (IUCN 3.1)

Scientific classification
- Kingdom: Animalia
- Phylum: Chordata
- Class: Actinopterygii
- Division: Teleostei
- Order: Clupeiformes
- Family: Alosidae
- Genus: Alosa
- Subgenus: Pomolobus
- Species: A. pseudoharengus

Binomial name
- Alosa pseudoharengus (A. Wilson, 1811)

Synonyms
- Clupea vernalis Mitchill, 1815; Clupea megalops Rafinesque, 1818; Clupea parvula Mitchill, 1814; Clupea pseudoharengus Wilson, 1811; Clupea virescens DeKay, 1842; Meletta venosa Valenciennes, 1847; Pomolobus pseudoharengus (Wilson, 1811)

= Alewife (fish) =

Species of North American shad

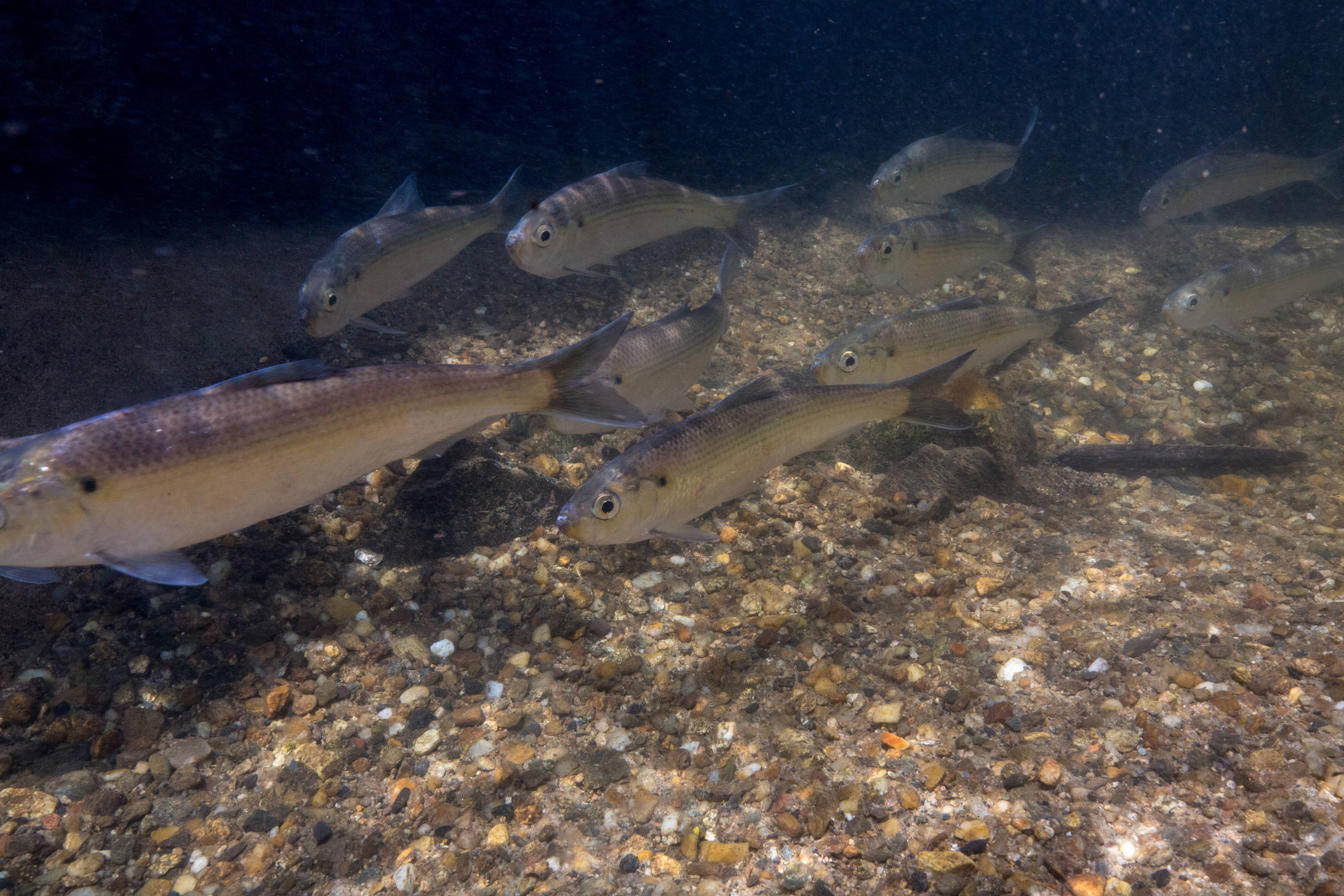
School of alewife

The alewife or river herring (Alosa pseudoharengus; pl.: alewives) is a species of herring found in North America. It is commonly anadromous but there are also significant landlocked populations. It is one of the smaller species of shad, of the subgenus Pomolobus. As an adult it is a marine species found in the northern West Atlantic Ocean, moving into estuaries before swimming upstream to breed in freshwater habitats, but some populations live entirely in fresh water.

It is known for its colonization of the Great Lakes via the Welland Canal, bypassing Niagara Falls. There, its population peaked between the 1950s and 1980s to the detriment of many native species of fish. In an effort to control it biologically, Pacific salmon were introduced, only partially successfully. As a marine fish, the alewife is a US National Marine Fisheries Service "Species of Concern".

== Description ==
Alewife reach a maximum standard length (SL) of about 40 centimetres (16 in), but have a typical SL of about 30 centimetres (12 in). The front of the body is deep and larger than other fish found in the same waters.

Alewife have bronze-colored heads and a grey-blue to greyish green dorsum. A humeral spot is often present. The tongue does not bear teeth. The peritoneum is light-colored with spots to dusky-appearing, an internal feature that distinguishes alewife from blueback herring (Alosa aestivalis), which have a dark peritoneum. The otolith is shaped like a letter "L", unlike its hooked shape in A. aestivalis. Additionally, the eye is larger than that of A. aestivalis; the width of the eye often exceeds the length of the snout in A. pseudoharengus.

== Etymology and folklore ==
Its common name is said to come from comparison with a corpulent female tavernkeeper ("ale-wife"), or, alternatively, from the word aloofe, possibly of Native American origin, that was used to describe this fish in the seventeenth and eighteenth centuries.

In southwestern Nova Scotia, alewife are referred to as kiacks (or kyacks). In Atlantic Canada it is known as the gaspereau, from the Acadian French word gasparot, first mentioned by Nicolas Denys. William Francis Ganong, New Brunswick biologist and historian, wrote:

Gaspereau, or Gasparot. Name of a common salt-water fish of Acadia (also called alewife), first used, so far as I can find, by Denys in 1672. Nowhere can I find any clue to its origin. It seems not to be Indian.

A number of locations are named after the Gaspereau around the historic region of Acadia. Acadians named three rivers after the fish, the Gaspereau River in Nova Scotia, as well as the Gaspereau River near Grand Lake and Gaspereau River near Northumberland Strait that are both in New Brunswick. Further, several lakes in Nova Scotia and New Brunswick hold the name Gaspereau Lake or Gaspereaux Lake, including in Kings County, Nova Scotia; Clare, Nova Scotia; Antigonish County, Nova Scotia; and Maugerville Parish, New Brunswick. The community of Gaspereau and the Gaspereau Valley are also found in Kings County, NS.

Both anadromous and landlocked forms occur. The landlocked form is also called a sawbelly or mooneye (although this latter name is more commonly applied to Hiodon spp.) Adult alewife are caught during their spring spawning migration upstream by being scooped out of shallow, constricted areas using large dip nets. They are the preferred bait for the spring lobster fishery in Maine, and are eaten by humans, usually smoked.

== In the North American Great Lakes ==
Alewife are known for their invasion of the Great Lakes by using the Welland Canal to bypass Niagara Falls. Although the United States Department of Agriculture suggests they may be native to Lake Ontario, alewife colonized the other Great Lakes and became abundant mostly in Lake Huron and Lake Michigan. It appears that they had spread from Lake Erie to other Great Lakes by the Detroit River and Lake St. Clair. They reached their peak abundance from the 1950s through the 1980s. Alewife grew in number unchecked because the lakes lacked a top predator (lake trout were essentially wiped out around the same time by overfishing and the invasion of the sea lamprey)

For a time, alewife, which often exhibit seasonal die-offs, washed up in windrows on the shorelines of the Great Lakes. Various species of Pacific salmon (first coho, and later the Chinook salmon) were introduced as predators. Though marginally successful, this led to the development of a salmon/alewife fishery popular with many sport anglers.

In spite of such biological control methods, alewife remain implicated in the decline of many native Great Lakes species. It is also a common predator of numerous native and non-native zooplankton taxa (e.g. Bythotrephes longimanus, Leptodiaptomus ashlandi, Limnocalanus spp., Leptodiaptomus minutus, Leptodiaptomus sicilis, and Leptodora kindtii). Wells (1970) found that increases in population of alewife in the Great Lakes between 1954 and 1966 were associated with population declines in certain larger species of zooplankton, while an alewife die-off in 1967 was temporally related to population rebound in most of those species.

== Conservation ==
Alewife populations have seen big declines throughout much of their range. Several threats have most likely contributed to their decline, including loss of habitat due to decreased access to spawning areas from the construction of dams and other impediments to migration, habitat degradation, fishing, and increased predation due to recovering striped bass populations.

In response to the declining population trend for alewives, the states of Massachusetts, Rhode Island, Connecticut, Virginia, and North Carolina have instituted moratoria on taking and possession.

In eastern Massachusetts, Alewife Brook flows through Arlington, Cambridge, and Somerville to the Mystic River. The brook gives its name to the Alewife Brook Parkway and the Alewife Brook Reservation. The Red Line (MBTA) of Boston's T ends at the Alewife station, so the name of this fish adorns the front of every northbound Red Line train. An extensive habitat restoration and education project, combined with a fish ladder with monitoring cameras, is yielding increasing numbers of alewife back in the improving Mystic River watershed.

The alewife is a US National Marine Fisheries Service Species of Concern, about which the National Oceanic and Atmospheric Administration, National Marine Fisheries Service, has some concerns regarding status and threats, but for which insufficient information is available to indicate a need to list the species under the US Endangered Species Act.
