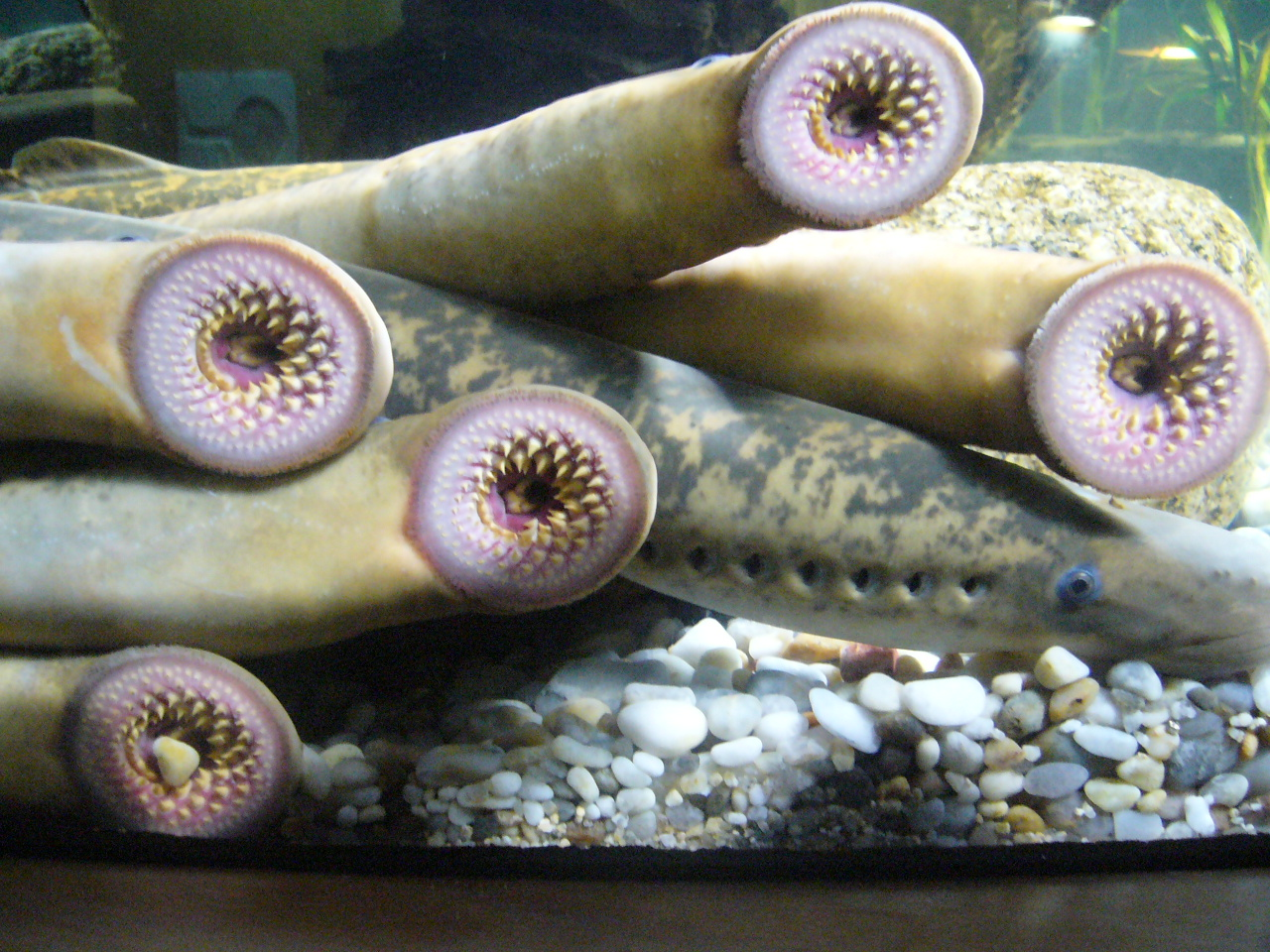
- Multiple sea lampreys in the Aquarium Finisterrae, Spain
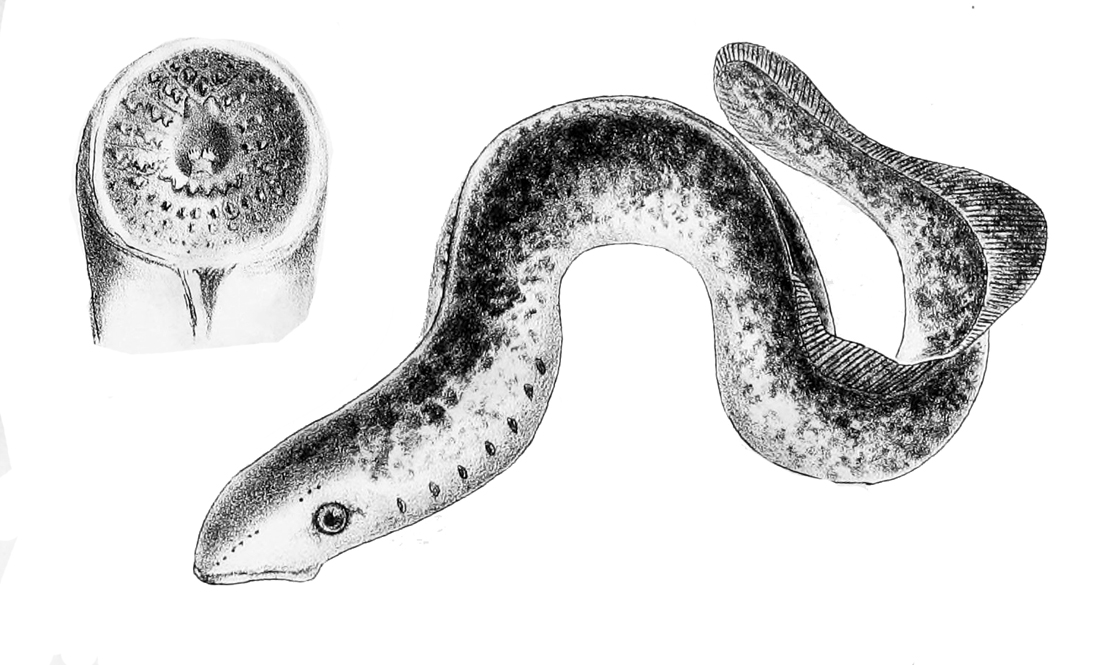

Conservation status
- Least Concern (IUCN 3.1)

Scientific classification
- Kingdom: Animalia
- Phylum: Chordata
- Infraphylum: Agnatha
- Class: Petromyzontida
- Order: Petromyzontiformes
- Family: Petromyzontidae
- Genus: Petromyzon; Linnaeus, 1758
- Species: P. marinus

Binomial name
- Petromyzon marinus Linnaeus, 1758

Synonyms
- Genus synonymy: Ammocoetus Dumeril 1812 non Erichson 1847; Petromyzon (Bathymyzon) Gill 1883; Bathymyzon (Gill 1883); Oceanomyzon Fowler 1908; Lampreda Rafinesque 1815 nomen nudum; Pricus Rafinesque 1815 nomen nudum; Species synonymy: Lampetra marina (Linnaeus 1758); Petromyzon (Bathymyzon) bairdii Gill 1883; Bathymyzon bairdii (Gill 1883); Petromyzon ruber Lacepède 1800; ?Petromyzon lampetrus Forsskål 1775 non Pallas 1814; Petromyzon lampetrus Pallas 1814 non Forsskål 1775; Petromyzon maximus Cuvier 1816; Petromyzon americanus Lesueur 1818; Petromyzon nigricans Lesueur 1818; Ammocoetes bicolor Lesueur 1818; ?Petromyzon adriaticus Nardo 1847; Petromyzon maculosus Gronow 1854; Petromyzon marinus dorsatus Wilder 1883; Petromyzon marinus unicolor Gage 1928; Oceanomyzon wilsoni Fowler 1908; ?Petromyzon leucopterus Rafinesque 1818; ?Petromyzon maurari DeKay 1840

= Sea lamprey =

Species of fish native to the Northern Hemisphere

The sea lamprey (Petromyzon marinus) is a parasitic lamprey native to the Northern Hemisphere. It is sometimes referred to as the "vampire fish".

It was likely introduced to the Great Lakes region through the Erie Canal in 1825 and the Welland Canal in 1919 where it has attacked native fish such as lake trout, lake whitefish, chub, and lake herring. Sea lampreys are considered a pest in the Great Lakes region as each individual has the potential of killing 40 pounds of fish through its 12–18 month feeding period.

== Description ==
The sea lamprey has an eel-like body without paired fins. Its mouth is jawless, round and sucker-like, and as wide or wider than the head; sharp teeth are arranged in many concentric circular rows around a sharp, rasp-like tongue. There are seven branchial or gill-like openings behind the eye. Sea lampreys are olive or brown-yellow on the dorsal and lateral part of the body, with some black marblings, with lighter coloration on the belly. Within their seven-year lifespans, adults can reach a length of up to 120 cm (47 in) and a body weight up to 2.3 kg (5.1 lb).

== Etymology ==
The genus name Petromyzon comes from Ancient Greek πέτρα (pétra), meaning "stone", and μυζάω (muzáō), meaning "to suck", and thus, "stone sucker". The specific epithet marinus is Latin for "of the sea".

== Distribution and habitat ==
The species is found in the northern and western Atlantic Ocean along the shores of Europe and North America, in the western Mediterranean Sea, the Black Sea, and as an invasive species in the Great Lakes. They have been found at depths up to 4,000 metres (13,120 ft) and can tolerate temperatures of 1–20 °C (34–68 °F).

In North America, they are native to the Connecticut River basin in the United States, and invasive to the inland Great Lakes and Lake Champlain in New York and Vermont. The largest European populations of sea lampreys are located throughout the southwestern areas of Europe (north-central Portugal, north-northwest of Spain, and west–southwest of France). These countries also support the main fisheries of the species.

== Ecology ==
Sea lampreys are anadromous; from their lake or sea habitats, they migrate up rivers to spawn. Females deposit a large number of eggs in nests made by males in the substrate of streams with moderately strong current. Spawning is followed by the death of the adults. Larvae burrow in the sand and silt bottom in quiet water downstream from spawning areas and filter-feed on plankton and detritus.

After several years in freshwater habitats, the larvae undergo a metamorphosis that allows young, post-metamorphic lampreys to migrate to the sea or lakes, and start the adult hematophagous method of feeding. Some individuals start hematophagous feeding in the river before migrating to the sea, where sea lampreys prey on a wide variety of fish.

The lamprey uses its suction cup-like mouth to attach itself to the skin of a fish and rasps away tissue with its sharp, probing tongue and keratinized teeth. A fluid produced in the lamprey's mouth, called lamphredin, prevents the victim's blood from clotting. Victims typically die from excessive blood loss or infection. After one year of hematophagous feeding, lampreys return to the river to spawn and die, a year and a half after the completion of metamorphosis.

Lampreys are considered a delicacy in some parts of Europe, and are seasonally available in France, Spain, and Portugal. They are served pickled in Finland. Mostly known for preparing cooked or grilled river lamprey, the sea lamprey occasionally is caught in the rivers of Latvia as well together with river lampreys.

== Physiology ==
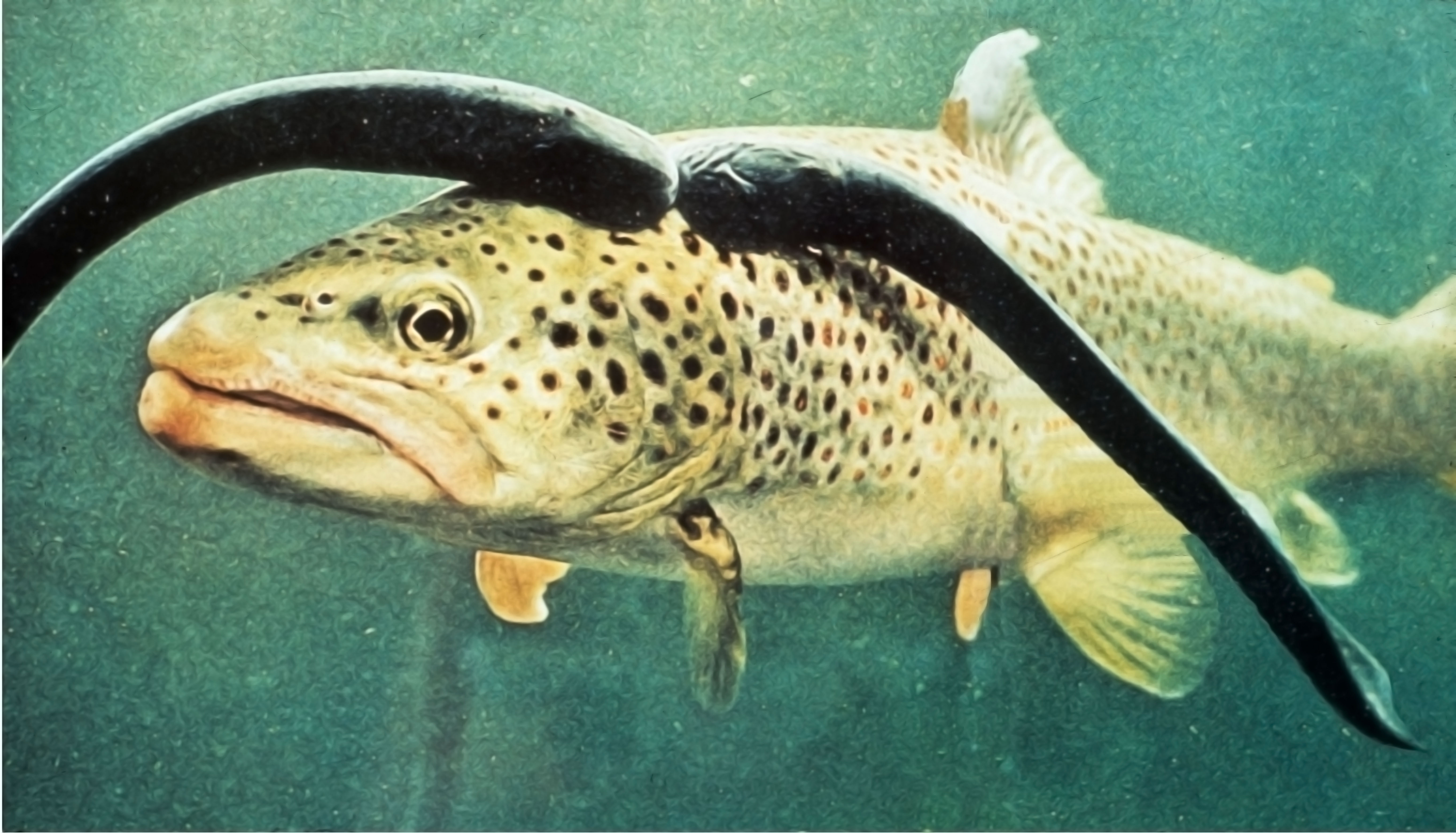
Two sea lamprey preying on a brown trout

Due to its lifecycle that switches between fresh and salt water, the sea lamprey is adapted to tolerate a wide range of salinities. Cell membranes on the surface of the gills are major contributors to ionoregulation. Changes in membrane composition influence the movement of different ions across the membrane, changing amounts of components to change the membranes' environment. In some instances, the sea lamprey has adapted to living exclusively in fresh water, as evidenced by the population in the Great Lakes.

As the larvae (called ammocoetes) move towards the oceans, the ratio between saturated fatty acids (SFA) and polyunsaturated fatty acids (PUFA) in the gills shifts towards higher amounts of SFA, as they affect the fluidity of the membrane, and higher levels of SFA lead to a decrease in permeability compared to PUFA. Lamprey ammocoetes have a relatively narrow range of salinity tolerance, but become better able to withstand wider ranges of salinity concentrations as they reach later stages of life. Tight regulation of Na/K-ATPase and an overall decrease in expression of H-ATPase assists in regulating the lamprey's internal fluid and ion balance as it moves to areas of higher salinity.

Lampreys also maintain acid-base homeostasis. When introduced to higher levels of acids, they are able to excrete excess acids at higher rates than most other saltwater fishes, and in much shorter times, with the majority of the transfer of ions occurring at the gill surface.

Sea lampreys parasitize other fishes for their diet, including elasmobranchs such as sharks and rays, which have naturally high levels of urea in their blood. Urea is toxic to most fishes in high concentrations, and is usually excreted immediately. Lampreys are able to tolerate much higher concentrations than most other fish and excrete it at extremely high rates, obtained from ingested blood. Trimethylamine oxides present in ingested elasmobranch blood aid in counteracting the detrimental effects of high urea concentration in the lamprey's bloodstream as it feeds.

=== Immunology ===
Two presumptive apolipoprotein B mRNA editing enzyme, catalytic polypeptide-like (APOBEC)s expressed in lymphocytes—CDA1 and CDA2—have been discovered in P. marinus.

== Genetics ==
The genome of Petromyzon marinus was sequenced in 2013. This sequencing effort revealed that the lamprey has unusual guanine-cytosine content and amino acid usage patterns compared to other vertebrates. The full sequence and annotation of the lamprey genome is available on the Ensembl genome browser.

The lamprey genome may serve as a model for developmental biology and evolution studies involving transposition of repetitive sequences. The lamprey genome undergoes drastic rearrangements during early embryogenesis in which about 20% of the germline DNA from somatic tissues is shed. The genome is highly repetitive. About 35% of the current genome assembly is composed of repetitive elements with high sequence identity. Northern lampreys have the highest number of chromosomes (164–174) among vertebrates.

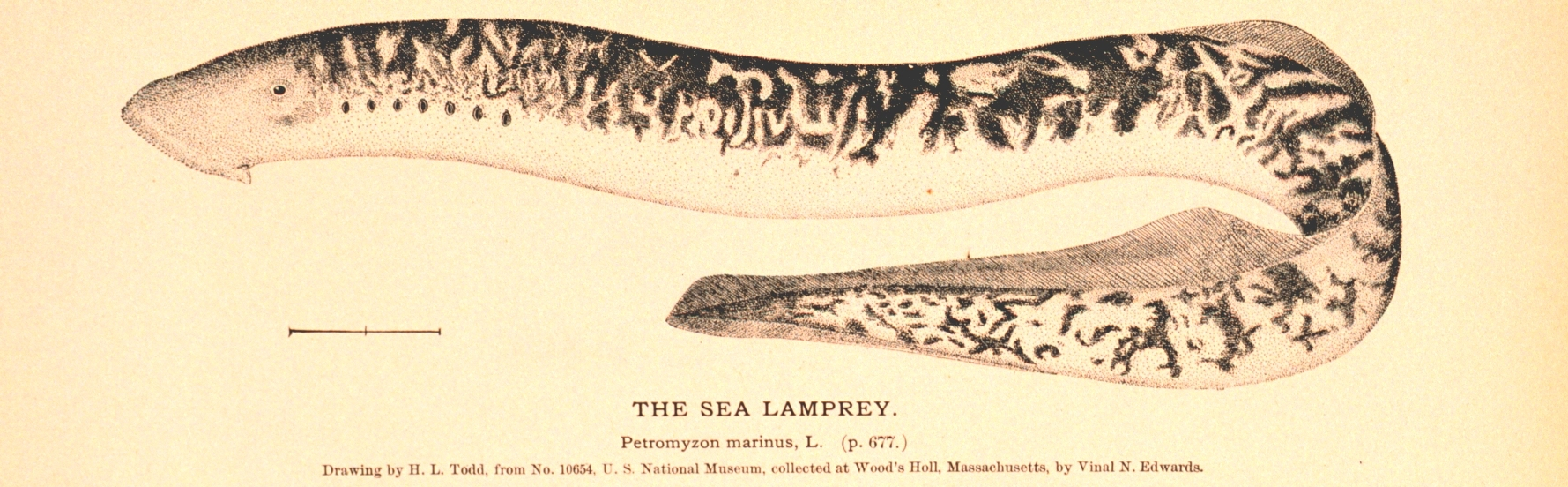
Sea lamprey drawn by H. L. Todd

Two genes important to immune function—CDA1 and CDA2—were first discovered in P. marinus and then found to be conserved across lampreys. See §Immunology above.

== Invasive species ==
Sea lampreys are considered a pest in the Great Lakes region. Whether it is native to Lake Ontario, where it was first noticed in the 1830s, or whether it was introduced through the Erie Canal, which opened in 1825 was not clear as of 2007. The species was first contained to Lake Ontario due to the natural barrier formed by Niagara Falls. However, after the Welland Canal was built in the late 1800s – early 1900s, they were able to bypass Niagara Falls and invade the remaining Great Lakes: Lakes Erie (1921), Michigan (1936), Huron (1937), and Superior (1938), where it decimated indigenous fish populations in the 1930s and 1940s.

In its original habitats, the sea lamprey coevolved with its hosts, and those hosts evolved a measure of resistance to the sea lampreys. However, in the Great Lakes, the sea lamprey attacks native fish such as lake trout, lake whitefish, chub, and lake herring, which historically did not face sea lampreys. Elimination of these predators allowed the alewife, another invasive species, to explode in population, with adverse effects on many native fish species.

The lake trout plays a vital role in the Lake Superior ecosystem. The lake trout has traditionally been considered an apex predator, which means that it has no predators. The sea lamprey is an aggressive predator by nature, which gives it a competitive advantage in a lake system where it has no predators and its prey lacks defenses against it. The sea lamprey played a large role in the destruction of the Lake Superior trout population. Lamprey introduction along with poor, unsustainable fishing practices caused the lake trout populations to decline drastically. The relationship between predators and prey in the Great Lakes ecosystem then became unbalanced. Each individual sea lamprey has the potential of killing 40 pounds of fish through its 12–18 month feeding period.

=== Efforts at control ===
Mouth of a sea lamprey, Petromyzon marinus

Video of the breathing of sea lamprey, Gijón Aquarium

Control efforts, including electric current and chemical lampricides have met with varied success. The control programs are carried out under the Great Lakes Fishery Commission, a joint Canada–U.S. body, specifically by the agents of the Fisheries and Oceans Canada and the United States Fish and Wildlife Service.

Genetic researchers have mapped the sea lamprey's genome in the hope of finding out more about evolution; scientists trying to eliminate the Great Lakes problem are coordinating with these genetic scientists, hoping to find out more about its immune system and fitting it into its place in the phylogenetic tree.

Researchers from Michigan State University have teamed up with others from the Universities of Minnesota, Guelph, and Wisconsin, and others in a research effort into newly synthesized pheromones. These are believed to have independent influences on the sea lamprey behavior. One group of pheromones serves a migratory function in that when they are made by larvae, they are thought to lure maturing adults into streams with suitable spawning habitat. Sex pheromones emitted from males are capable of luring females long distances to specific locations. These pheromones are both several different compounds thought to elicit different behaviors that collectively influence the lampreys to exhibit migratory or spawning behaviors. Scientists are trying to characterize the function of each pheromone, and each part of the molecules, to determine if they can be used in a targeted effort at environmentally friendly lamprey control. However, as of 2017, the most effective control measures still involve the application of (3-trifluoromethyl-4-nitrophenol), or TFM, a selective pesticide, into rivers. As of 2018 no lampricide resistance has been detected in the Great Lakes. Further research and combined use of multiple control methods are needed to forestall future development of resistance.

Another technique used in the prevention of lamprey population growth is the use of barriers in major reproduction streams of high value to the lamprey. The purpose of the barriers is to block their upstream migration to reduce reproduction. The issue with these barriers is that other aquatic species are also inhibited by this barrier. Fish that use tributaries are impeded from traveling upstream to spawn. To account for this, barriers have been altered and designed to allow the passage of most fish species, but still impede others.

==== Restoration ====
The intent of lamprey control programs is a safer habitat and a healthier population growth for vulnerable native fish species such as lake trout. The Connecticut Department of Energy and Environmental Protection (DEEP) has taken a different path to this same goal by introducing sea lampreys to freshwater rivers and lakes of the Connecticut River watershed, and providing easier access around dams and other barriers for the lampreys to reach spawning sites high upstream. After preying on larger fish at sea, the adult lampreys migrate up the rivers to spawn, whereupon they quickly die of natural causes and decompose, thus providing a food source for the native freshwater fish species.

== See also ==
- Lamprey pie
