= Freshwater smelt =

Freshwater smelt may refer to:

  - Wakasagi smelts, an introduced species of smelt in California, native to eastern Asia.
  - Great Lakes smelts, (North American) in the family Osmeridae and genera Allosmerus, Hypomesus, Mallotus, Osmerus, Spirinchus and Thaleichthys
  - Whitebait smelts (North American) in the family Osmeridae and genera: Allosmerus, Elongatus, Hypomesus and Mallotus
