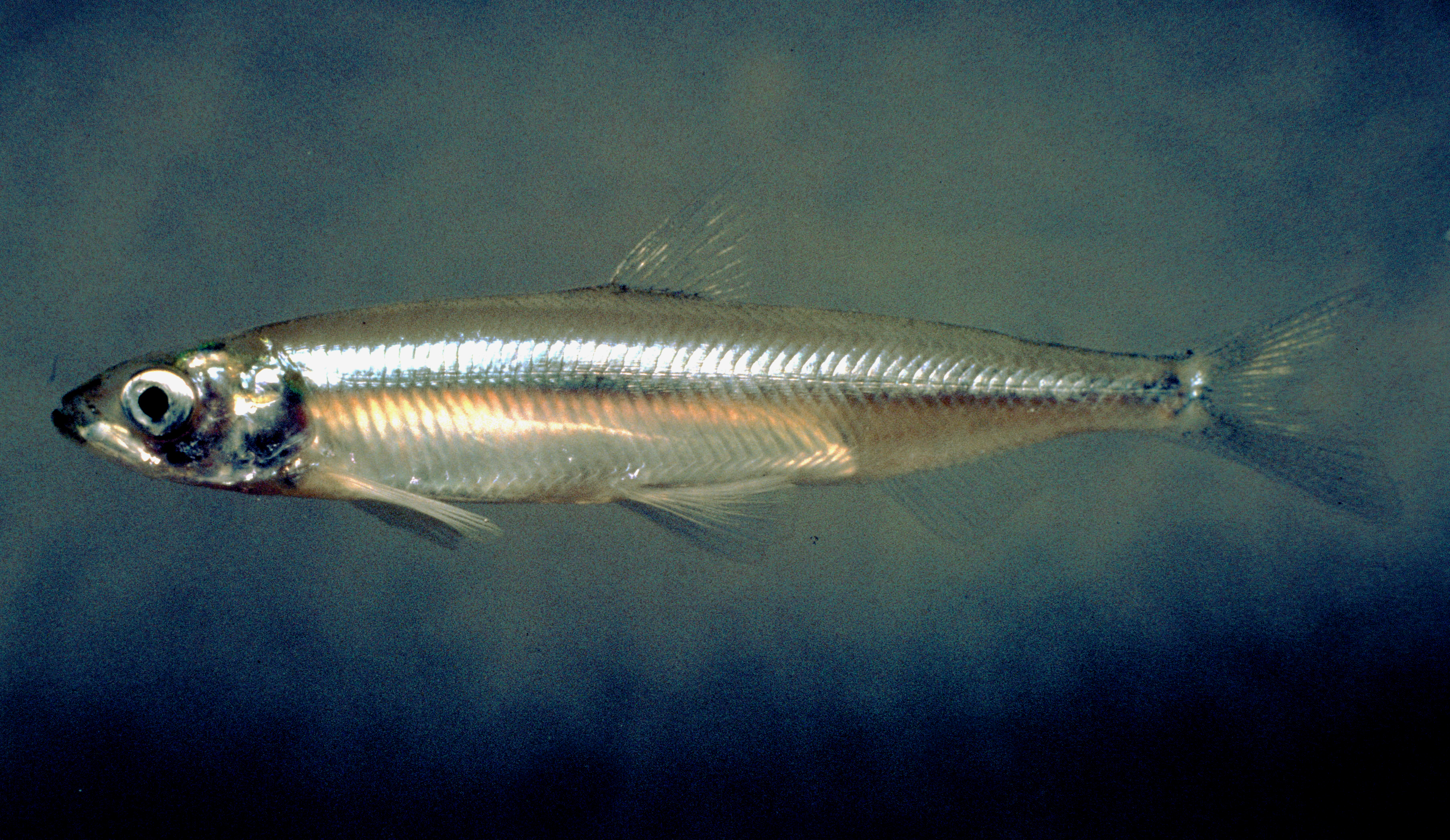

Conservation status
- Critically Endangered (IUCN 3.1)

- Threatened (ESA)

Scientific classification
- Kingdom: Animalia
- Phylum: Chordata
- Class: Actinopterygii
- Order: Osmeriformes
- Family: Osmeridae
- Genus: Hypomesus
- Species: H. transpacificus

Binomial name
- Hypomesus transpacificus McAllister, 1963

= Delta smelt =

Species of fish

The delta smelt (Hypomesus transpacificus) is an endangered slender-bodied smelt, about 5 to 7 cm (2.0 to 2.8 in) long, in the family Osmeridae. Endemic to the upper Sacramento-San Joaquin Estuary of California, it mainly inhabits the freshwater-saltwater mixing zone of the estuary, except during its spawning season, when it migrates upstream to fresh water following winter "first flush" flow events (around March to May). It functions as an indicator species for the overall health of the Delta's ecosystem. Delta Smelt are usually found at temperatures of less than 25 °C and prefer temperatures of around 20 °C. They are euryhaline but occur mostly at salinities of 0–7 practical salinity units.

Because of its one-year lifecycle and relatively low fecundity, it is very susceptible to changes in the environmental conditions of its native habitat. It is listed as a federally threatened species under the Endangered Species Act of 1973. Efforts to protect the fish from further decline and extinction have focused on limiting or modifying the large-scale pumping activities of state and federal water projects at the southern end of the estuary, thereby limiting water available to farming. However, these efforts have not prevented the species from becoming functionally extinct in the wild.

Delta smelt is easily confused with longfin smelt (Spirinchus thaleichthys). They are both small, pelagic fish species native to the estuarine and coastal waters of the Pacific coast, but they exhibit distinct ecological, morphological, and behavioral characteristics. The delta smelt, a key indicator species, is endemic to the San Francisco Bay-Delta and has a slender body averaging 5–7 cm in length, with a translucent appearance and a faint, blue lateral line. It primarily inhabits low-salinity waters and is critically endangered due to habitat loss and water management practices. In contrast, the longfin smelt is slightly larger, typically reaching up to 15 cm, and is distinguished by its long pectoral fins that extend beyond the base of the pelvic fins.

== Taxonomy and evolution ==
- - - H. olidus
    - H. nipponensis
  - - H. japonicus
    - - H. pretiosus
      - H. transpacificus

Phylogeny of the genus Hypomesus.

The delta smelt is one of five currently recognized species within the genus Hypomesus, which is part of the larger smelt family, Osmeridae. The genus has been subject to many revisions since it was first classified by Gill in 1863. The first major revision occurred in 1963, when the family Osmeridae was re-examined by Canadian ichthyologist Donald Evan McAllister. Expanding on Japanese researcher Hamada's earlier determination that H. olidus was not a monolithic widespread species, but rather one of three distinct species of Hypomesus, McAllister assigned them new names, and further delineated what he believed were four subspecies. This was the first description of H. transpacificus, named for its supposed occurrence on both sides of the Pacific, and also "to the friendship of Japanese and Canadian ichthyologists." He separated these geographically isolated populations into separate subspecies: H. t. transpacificus and H. t. nipponensis.

Modern analysis of the genus would elevate all of McAllister's subspecies to full species status, based on fin ray counts and the number of chromatophores between their mandibles, a change which genetic analysis has supported. In fact, genetic analysis would conclude that despite their morphological similarities, H. nipponensis and H. transpacificus are actually members of different phylogenetic clades.

The abbreviated distribution of Hypomesus species along both the east and west sides of the Pacific Ocean suggests that their common ancestor had a range that would have crossed the Pacific. Researchers have hypothesized that climatic changes may have reduced the range of the ancestral species during cooling periods, which would have created a reproductive barrier, allowing speciation to occur. Although the low number of species in the genus and high levels of homoplasy have frustrated attempts to determine whether the northern Pacific H. olidus or H. nipponensis are sister to the remaining species of Hypomesus, the most recent speciation event in Hypomesus is known to have been between the two native east Pacific species, H. pretiosus and H. transpacificus. This is plausibly due to a geographic isolation of a widespread eastern Pacific ancestor, of which some members were isolated in a freshwater basin in western California, possibly in the lakes that would have been located in the southern San Joaquin Valley during the Pleistocene epoch.

Genetic studies of delta smelt populations in recent years have revealed potential signs of adaptation to environmental changes, such as increased tolerance to warmer water temperatures. These changes are thought to be driven by the increasingly challenging conditions in the San Francisco Estuary, where rapid alterations in water temperature, salinity, and habitat availability have exerted selective pressures on the species. Evidence of genetic differentiation between wild and hatchery populations has also been observed, raising concerns about the long-term viability of hatchery supplementation programs designed to conserve the species.

== Habitat ==
The delta smelt is endemic to the Sacramento–San Joaquin River Delta in California, where it is distributed from the Suisun Bay upstream through the delta in Contra Costa, Sacramento, San Joaquin, and Solano Counties. The delta smelt is a pelagic (lives in the open water column away from the bottom) and euryhaline species (tolerant of a wide salinity range). It has been collected from estuarine waters with salinities up to 14 parts per thousand.Delta smelt populations tend to aggregate in areas with moderate turbidity, which enhances their ability to feed and avoid predators.

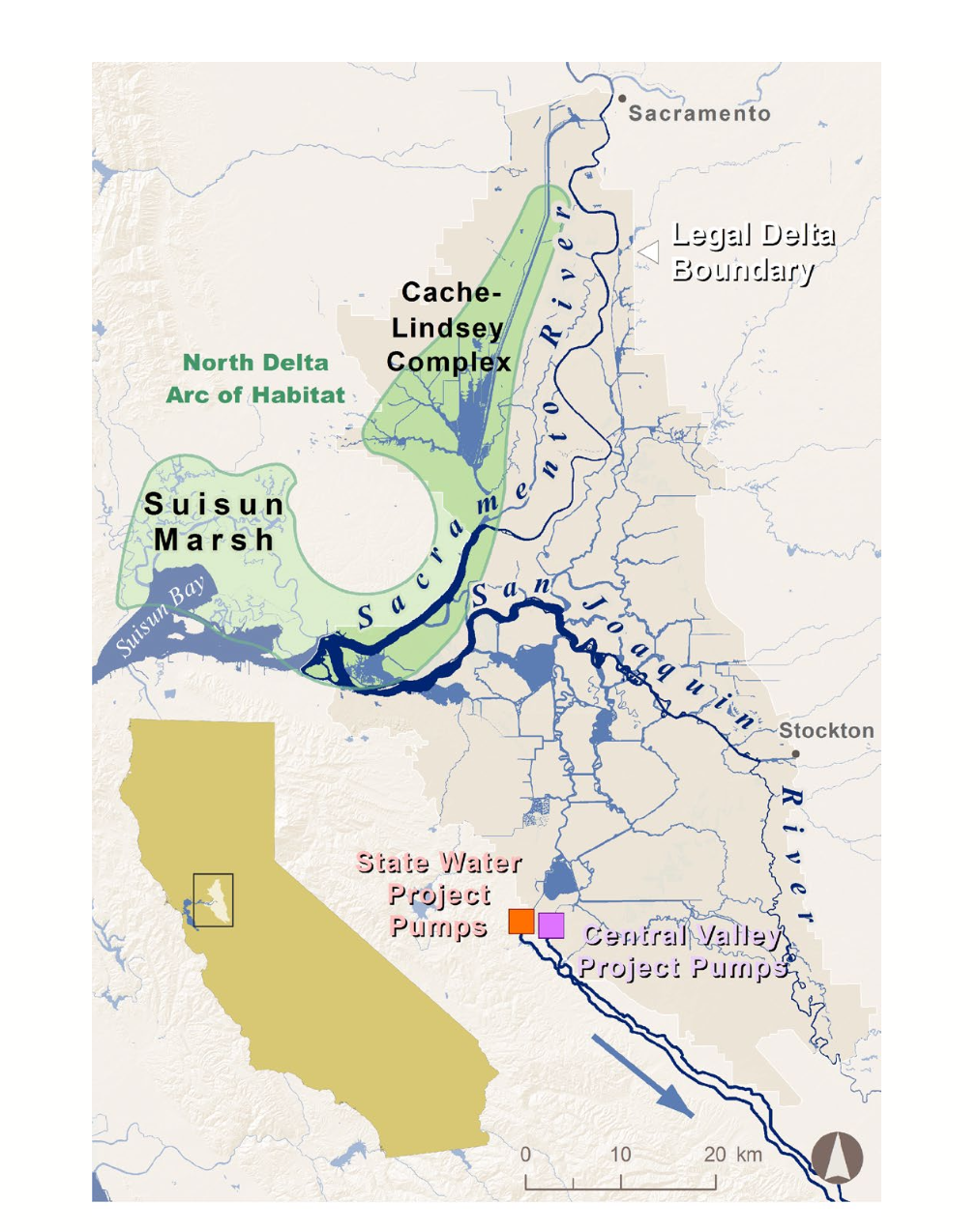
Current Habitat of Delta Smelt

Historically, delta smelt were distributed from San Pablo Bay upstream to Sacramento on the Sacramento River and Mossdale on the San Joaquin River, which varied seasonally and with freshwater outflow. Today, large areas of historic delta smelt habitat and designated critical habitat have become unsuitable for some life history stages of the species, though key environmental characteristics (e.g. temperature, salinity, water depth) of these areas have not changed. Delta smelt disappeared from the southern portion of their historic habitat in the late 1970s, which coincides with substantial increases in the amounts of water exported from the delta. Water export operations likely have a great effect on the distribution, abundance, and genetic diversity of delta smelt.

== Lifecycle ==
The delta smelt is semelparous, living one year and dying after its first spawning. Their spawning occurs in spring in river channels and tidally influenced backwater sloughs upstream of the mixing zone where salt water meets fresh water. The Sacramento and San Joaquin Rivers then transport the delta smelt larvae downstream to the mixing zone, normally located in the Suisun Bay. Young delta smelt then feed and grow in the mixing zone before starting their upstream spawning migration in late fall or early winter.

The delta smelt is preyed upon by larger fish, especially striped bass and largemouth bass, which are introduced species in the Sacramento-San Joaquin Delta.

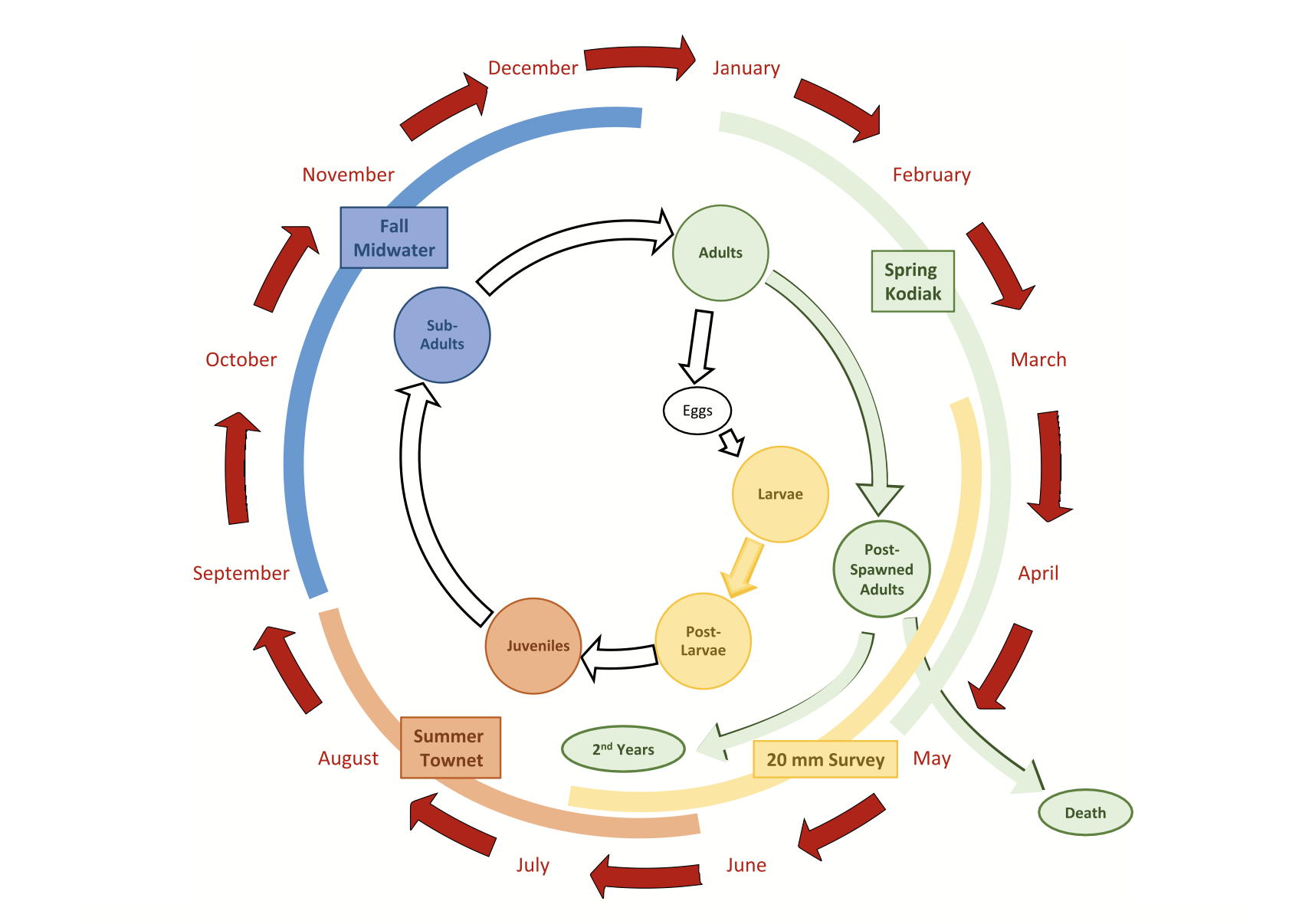
Life Cycle of Delta Smelt Throughout the Year

== Endangered status ==
Historically, delta smelt were relatively abundant in the upper Sacramento-San Joaquin Estuary, with populations declining dramatically in the 1980s. They were listed as threatened by both federal and state governments in 1993, and sustained record-low abundance indices, prompted their listing as endangered under the California Endangered Species Act in 2010. Critical habitat was listed for delta smelt on December 19, 1994.

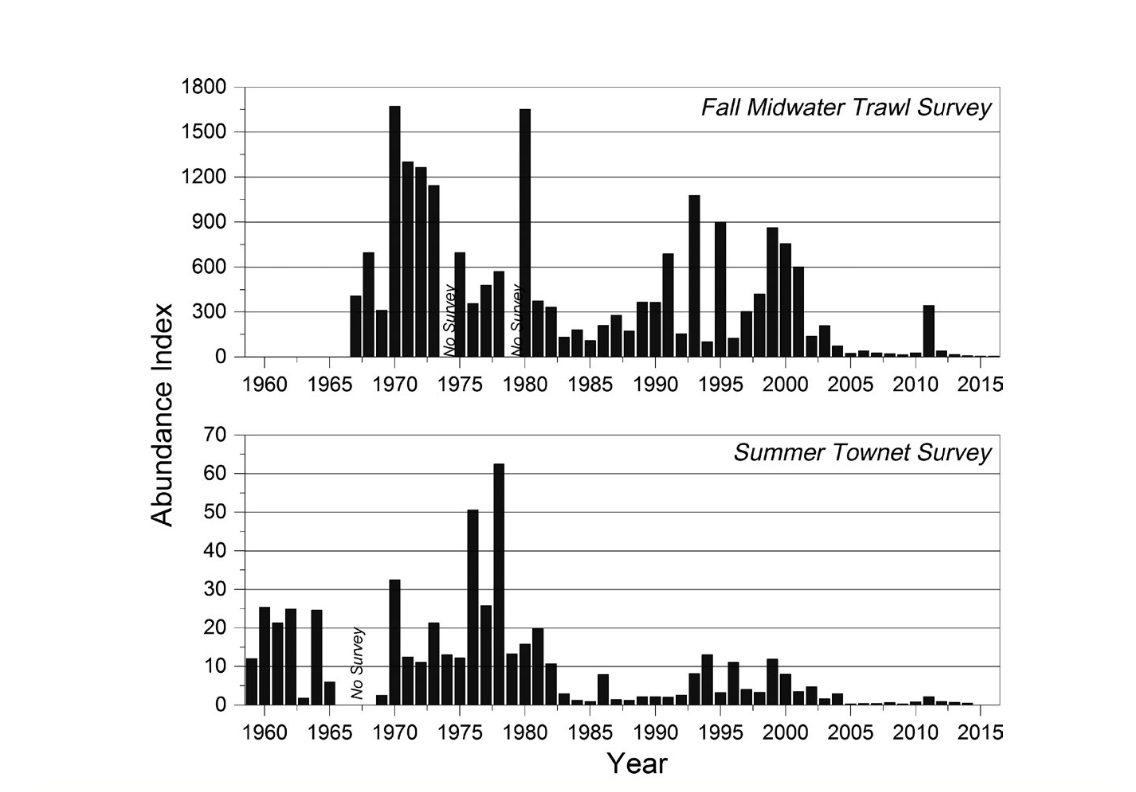
Abundance Index of Delta Smelt from 1960 to 2015

Delta smelt are threatened with extinction due to anthropogenic alterations to their ecosystem, including urbanization, non-native species, water diversions, contaminants, and the conversion of complex tidal habitats to leveed channels. A survey in April 2015 found only one individual delta smelt. Although the fish is almost extinct in the wild, extant populations remain in a captive-breeding program at UC Davis and in a fish hatchery operated by the U.S. Fish and Wildlife Service near Shasta Dam.

== Environmental threats and challenges ==
The decline of the delta smelt may have been caused by environmental challenges, both natural and human-derived.

=== Habitat degradation ===
The transformation of the Sacramento-San Joaquin Delta into a network of levees and channels changed the natural hydrology of the region. This has resulted in the loss of important tidal wetlands and shallow water habitats that are essential for delta smelt spawning, feeding, and rearing. Agricultural and urban developments have dramatically reduced the available natural habitat for the species, pushing delta smelt into fragmented and degraded environments. Water diversion projects, such as the Central Valley Project and the State Water Project, have further reduced the availability of freshwater flows, particularly during dry years. These reduced flows impact not only the quality of delta smelt habitat but also their access to low-salinity areas, which are critical for survival.

=== Invasive species ===
The introduction of non-native species, such as the overbite clam (Potamocorbula amurensis) and Mississippi silverside (Menidia audens), has greatly affected delta smelt survival. These invasive species compete with delta smelt for food resources, particularly zooplankton, which is crucial for their diet. Invasive predators, such as striped bass and largemouth bass, also pose a significant threat by preying on delta smelt, further reducing their already dwindling populations. Invasive aquatic plants, like water hyacinth (Eichhornia crassipes), have altered the structure of the delta ecosystem by creating dense mats of vegetation. These mats limit water movement and light penetration, reducing water quality and making the delta less hospitable for delta smelt and other native species.

=== Water contamination ===
The delta smelt's habitat contains a variety of pollutants, including agricultural runoff, pesticides, heavy metals, and urban contaminants. Pesticide use, particularly in agricultural areas surrounding the delta, has led to toxic runoff entering the waterways, affecting the smelt's reproductive success and overall health. Studies have shown that exposure to contaminants like copper and ammonia can impair the smelt's behavior, physiology, and immune response. Histopathological assessments conducted over several year-classes of delta smelt have revealed significant tissue damage, particularly in the liver and gills, which is linked to chronic exposure to pollutants such as ammonia and heavy metals. Endocrine-disrupting chemicals (EDCs) have also been detected in the delta, which can interfere with the delta smelt's hormonal systems and reproduction. These contaminants can have long-term, sub-lethal effects that reduce the population's resilience to other environmental stressors.

=== Climate change ===
Climate change is an emerging threat to the delta smelt. Rising water temperatures, changes in precipitation patterns, and increased frequency of droughts are expected to further reduce the availability of suitable habitat for delta smelt. Higher water temperatures have a direct impact on the species' reproductive success and survival, as delta smelt are sensitive to temperature fluctuations. Warmer waters can accelerate metabolic rates, leading to increased oxygen demand and heightened stress levels. Higher water temperatures have a direct impact on the species' behavior, as delta smelt exhibit increased swimming speeds and altered group structures in warmer waters, which makes them more susceptible to predation. Studies have shown that delta smelt's anti-predator responses weaken in higher temperatures, which increases their vulnerability to predators like largemouth bass. These predator-prey dynamics become especially pronounced in mixed-species shoals, where temperature increases shift interspecies interactions and further impact delta smelt survival. Additionally, climate change can alter the timing and quantity of freshwater flows, pushing the delta smelt into more saline environments, which are less suitable for their survival.

=== Hydrological changes ===
Water diversion projects have altered the natural flow of freshwater into the delta, reducing the amount of water available for delta smelt habitats, especially during critical spawning and rearing periods. The diversion of freshwater for agriculture, combined with increasing urban water demands, has left the delta smelt with fewer areas of low salinity where they can thrive. Recent studies have highlighted the potential effects of water flow management on the migration and behavior of delta smelt. The timing of freshwater pulses, especially in dry years, is crucial for the species to access key habitats. In some years, water management practices have inadvertently resulted in higher mortality rates due to entrainment at water export facilities, where smelt are sucked into pumps and removed from their habitats.

== Court protection ==
In 2005, the U.S. Fish and Wildlife Service (FWS) issued a biological opinion that the Central Valley Project and the California State Water Project were not having an adverse effect on the recovery of the delta smelt. The Natural Resources Defense Council sued, and in 2007, Fresno U.S. District Court Judge Oliver Wanger found the biological opinion was arbitrary and capricious and ordered protections for the delta smelt while the document was redone.

In 2008, at the close of the court's deadline, the FWS issued a new biological opinion. This time, the FWS came to the opposite of its earlier conclusion, finding the water projects were jeopardizing the continued existence of the delta smelt. When six new plaintiffs sued, Judge Wanger preliminarily ordered the FWS to give him weekly justifications of delta flow restrictions and appointed four scientists as his own expert witnesses. After haranguing FWS expert witnesses as "zealots", in December 2010 Judge Wanger, again, found the FWS BioOp was arbitrary and capricious and, again, ordered the FWS to complete a new one.

In 2014, a divided panel of the Ninth Circuit Court of Appeals reversed Judge Wanger. While the new biological opinion was "a ponderous, chaotic document, overwhelming in size", it was found not arbitrary and capricious. The Ninth Circuit affirmed that the water projects were jeopardizing the existence of the delta smelt, and given TVA v. Hill's command that endangered species must be saved "whatever the cost", Circuit Judge Jay Bybee opined that California could only use the smelts' water after receiving an exemption from the God Squad. In January 2015 the U.S. Supreme Court declined review without comment.

The smelt is unpopular among farmers, with a common complaint being that 200,000 acres of farmland have been left fallow due to "four buckets of minnows". Although allegations have been made that this protection has hurt California's agricultural sector, with the devastation of hundreds of thousands of acres of farmland and the loss of tens of thousands of jobs in the Central Valley, a 2009 UC Davis study estimated that job losses due to smelt protection were closer to 5,000.

In more recent developments, the Trump administration's 2019 rollback of environmental protections, including changes to the Endangered Species Act, led to renewed legal battles over the delta smelt's habitat protection. Critics argued that the revised rules weakened critical safeguards for species like the delta smelt by prioritizing water deliveries to agriculture over the preservation of essential ecosystems. Environmental groups filed lawsuits challenging these regulatory changes, claiming that the rollback would further endanger the already critically low delta smelt population. The legal back-and-forth continued under the Biden administration, which signaled a return to stronger protections for endangered species, including the delta smelt. In 2021, federal agencies began revisiting the rollback of these water and species protections, but debates between agricultural interests and conservation groups remain ongoing.

== Conservation and restoration efforts ==
Efforts to conserve and restore the delta smelt (Hypomesus transpacificus) population have been ongoing for decades, as this species continues to face significant threats from habitat degradation, climate change, and water management practices. Multiple state and federal agencies, in partnership with universities and conservation organizations, have implemented a variety of strategies aimed at preventing the extinction of this critically endangered species.

=== Captive breeding programs ===
Since 2008, the delta smelt has been bred in captivity as part of a conservation hatchery program at UC Davis. The Fish Conservation and Culture Laboratory in Byron, California, has successfully developed techniques to raise delta smelt under controlled conditions, with a focus on maximizing genetic diversity and preserving the species' genetic integrity. Recent research has highlighted the importance of maintaining genetic diversity in hatchery populations to ensure their resilience and adaptability when reintroduced into the wild. These hatchery programs have become critical as wild populations continue to decline. However, concerns remain about the ability of hatchery-reared delta smelt to adapt to the natural environment and survive long-term without genetic degradation.

=== Habitat restoration initiatives ===
In response to habitat loss and degradation, large-scale habitat restoration projects have been initiated in the Sacramento-San Joaquin Delta and Suisun Marsh.Restoration efforts focus on recreating tidal wetlands and improving water quality, which are essential for the delta smelt's life cycle. These restored habitats aim to provide the delta smelt with improved spawning grounds, adequate food resources, and reduced predation pressures. However, the success of these restoration efforts is often challenged by the ongoing presence of invasive species, such as the overbite clam (Potamocorbula amurensis) and the Mississippi silverside (Menidia audens), which compete with delta smelt for food and further reduce their chances of survival.

=== Water management and flow regulation ===
The management of water resources in California has long been at odds with the conservation of delta smelt. Water diversions for agricultural and urban uses have significantly reduced the freshwater flows that are crucial for maintaining the delta smelt's habitat. Regulatory measures, such as the enforcement of flow restrictions and the establishment of critical habitat areas, have been implemented to ensure that sufficient freshwater reaches key delta smelt habitats, especially during dry years. Despite these efforts, balancing the competing demands for water remains a challenge, and legal battles over water allocation continue to play a central role in delta smelt conservation.

=== Scientific research and monitoring ===
Ongoing scientific research helps scientists understand delta smelt's life history, genetic diversity, and environmental needs. Researchers have conducted extensive studies on the impact of environmental factors such as temperature, salinity, and turbidity on delta smelt behavior, growth, and survival. Recent studies have highlighted how climate change, including rising water temperatures and altered precipitation patterns, is likely to exacerbate the challenges faced by delta smelt populations. Furthermore, the use of advanced modeling techniques has helped predict how changes in water flow and habitat conditions will affect delta smelt distribution and survival, providing essential data for future conservation efforts.

== See also ==
- California Aqueduct
