= Japanese smelt =

Japanese smelt may refer to:

- Hypomesus nipponensis, also known as the wakasagi smelt, a native freshwater fish of Japanese lakes and estuaries.
- Hypomesus japonicus, a marine smelt ranging from northern Japan up to Peter the Great Bay of Russia.

== See also ==
- Shishamo, Spirinchus lanceolatus, a smelt common in Japanese cuisine
