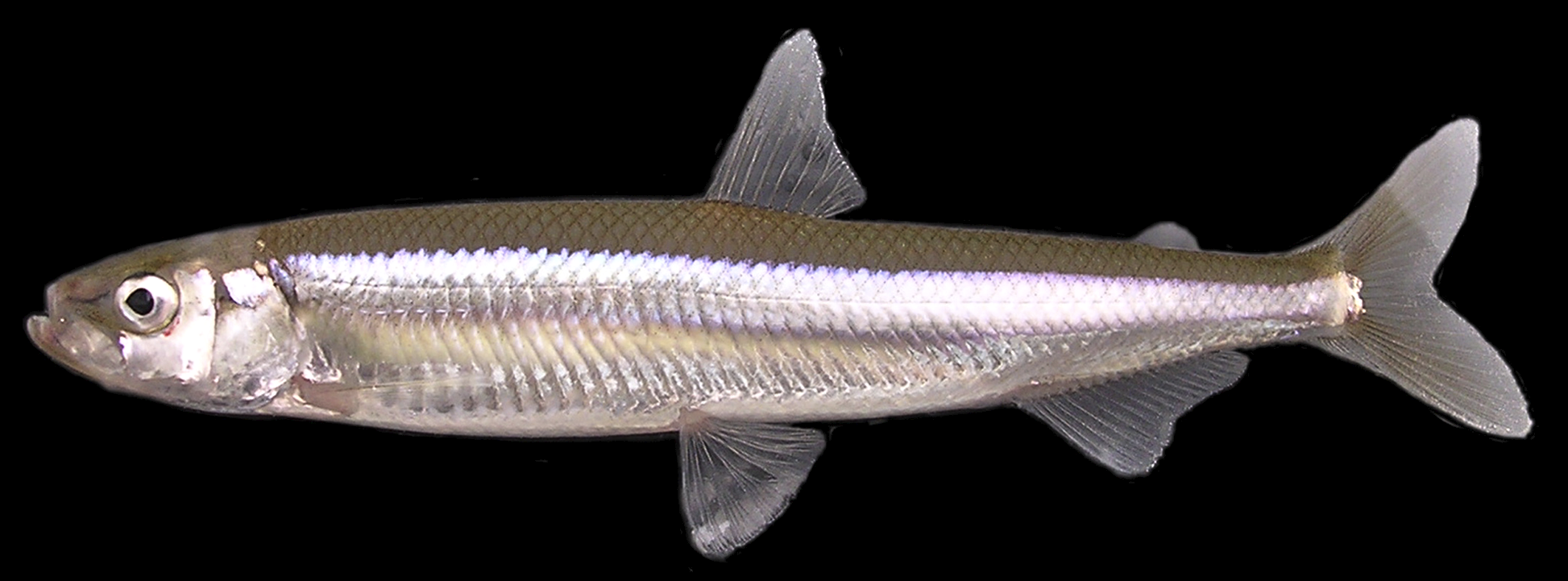

Conservation status
- Least Concern (IUCN 3.1)

Scientific classification
- Kingdom: Animalia
- Phylum: Chordata
- Class: Actinopterygii
- Order: Osmeriformes
- Family: Osmeridae
- Genus: Hypomesus
- Species: H. nipponensis

Binomial name
- Hypomesus nipponensis McAllister, 1963

= Hypomesus nipponensis =

Species of fish

Hypomesus nipponensis (Japanese smelt, in Japanese: wakasagi) is a commercial food fish native to the lakes and estuaries of northern Honshu and Hokkaido, Japan, Korea, and Sakhalin, Khabarovsk Krai, and Primorsky Krai, Russia. It has been introduced in other locations, including the San Francisco Delta of the United States. It is raised in fisheries, and is very similar in appearance to the delta smelt (H. transpacificus).

== Genomics ==
A chromosome-level genome assembly of the Japanese smelt (Hypomesus nipponensis) was published in 2026. The genome size is approximately 708 Mb, with the assembly anchored to 28 chromosomes. The assembly has a BUSCO completeness of 97.3%, and 24,102 protein-coding genes were predicted.

== Synonyms ==
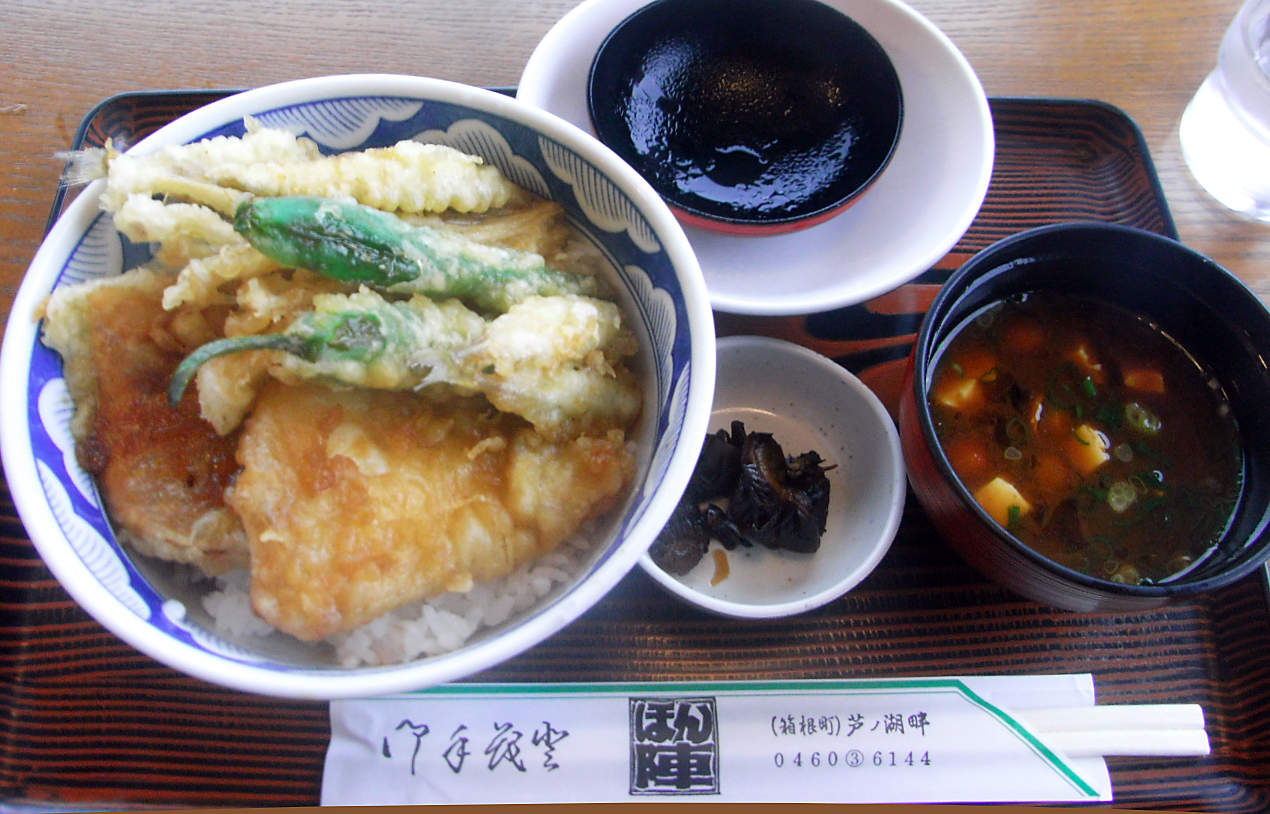
Fried wakasagi in a Japanese dish, under the green peppers

- - - Hypomesus olidus
    - Hypomesus nipponensis
  - - Hypomesus japonicus
    - - Hypomesus pretiosus
      - Hypomesus transpacificus

Phylogeny of the genus Hypomesus including H. chishimaensis under H. nipponensis.

Hypomesus chishimaensis was described as being a new species in the lakes of Kunashir and Iturup in 1997 based on claimed morphological differences. After later studies failed to find these morphological differences, it regarded as an ecotype of H. nipponensis. A 2007 genetic analysis supported this classification, and recommended that H. chishimaensis not be given its own binomial designation.

== Introduction to the United States ==
Native to the lakes and estuaries of Hokkaido, Japan and introduced to the lakes on Honshu and Kyushu, the Japanese wakasagi was introduced to California water reservoirs by the California Department of Fish and Game to provide more prey for stocked rainbow trout after failed attempts to introduce native delta smelt to three foothill reservoirs. At the time, the California-native delta smelt and the Japanese smelt were thought to be separated members of the same species, H. olidus. In 1959 the CDFG imported 3.6 million fertilized eggs attached to palm fiber mats from a population in Suwa Lake, located east of Tokyo; many of these eggs were dead on arrival. The fiber mats were placed in streams feeding into six lakes and reservoirs that appeared to be ecologically suitable for the smelt. (Note: The fish were introduced into Freshwater Lagoon in Humboldt County, as well as the Dodge (Lassen County), Shastina (Siskiyou County), Spaulding (Nevada County), Jenkinson-Sly Park (El Dorado County) and Big Bear (San Bernardino County) Reservoirs.) It was thought at the time that these reservoirs could be chemically treated to eradicate the fish if they were found to be undesirable. In 1972 and 1973 about 77,000 fish from the Shastina Reservoir were moved to the Almanor Reservoir in Plumas County. All attempts to introduce the fish were successful, except the Dodge and Big Bear Reservoir introductions, the latter of which may have been partially attributable to chemical treatments meant to eradicate stunted crappie and goldfish.

=== Progression into delta ===
Although a retrospective analysis of preserved delta smelt samples caught in 1972 and 1982 from the Delta region has shown that wakasagi had been invading the estuaries in undetected quantities since at least the early 1970s, wakasagi expansion from these original introduction sites southward was not tracked until several years later. In 1994 they were detected at the State Water Project pumping plant for the first time, and by 1998 the fish could be found throughout the estuary including the Suisun and San Pablo Bays.

=== Consequences ===
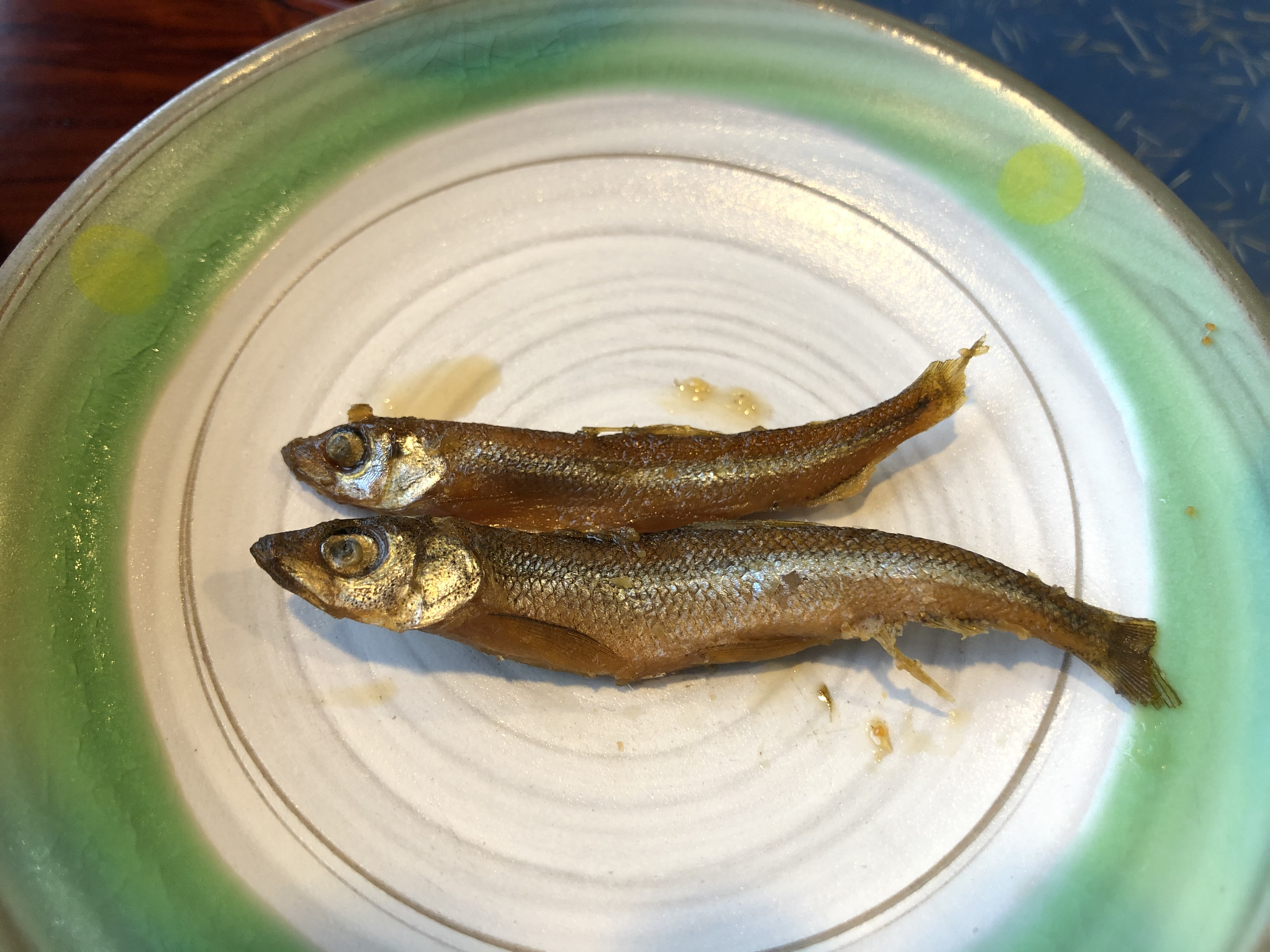
Simmered and candied Japanese smelt

Because the two species are very similar in morphology and life history, the wakasagi presents several potential threats to the endangered delta smelt. Besides direct competition for nutritional resources and the possibility that wakasagi may prey on the eggs and larvae of delta smelt, hybridization could either dilute the species or cause population decline due to sterilizing effects. In fact, a few hybrids have been captured in the wild, although all of them were first generation crosses and no evidence of back-crossing has been found, which would suggest that the hybrids were not viable. Misidentification of the species is an additional concern, which could lead to inaccurate assessments critical to making policy decisions; however this problem may be mitigated if genetic markers are used for identification.

In addition to its negative effects on the delta smelt, the wakasagi significantly reduced Kokanee fisheries, but helped increase growth rates of other salmon and trout fisheries.
