= Kushikatsu =

Japanese food

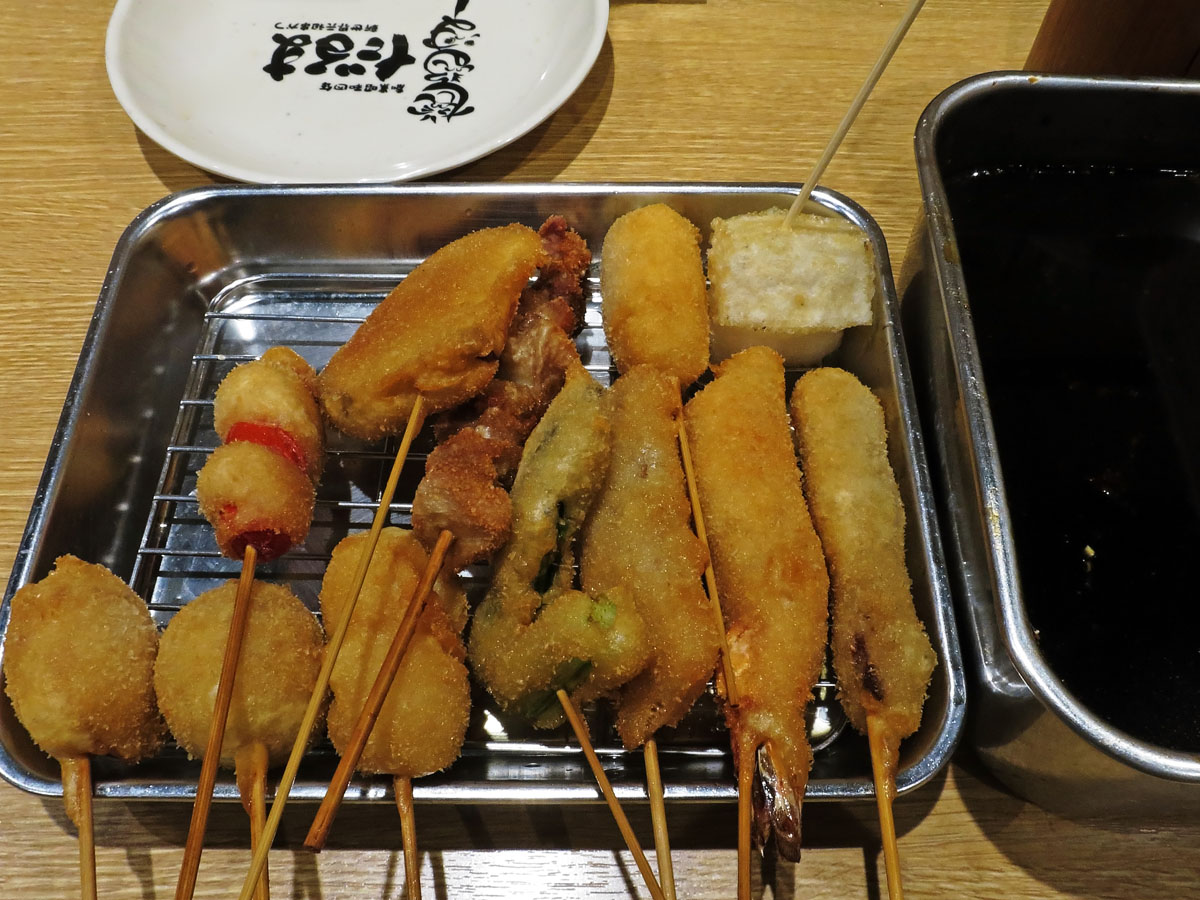
- Skewers of Osaka-style kushikatsu
- Alternative names: Kushiage
- Type: Deep-fried skewered meat and vegetables
- Place of origin: Japan
- Main ingredients: Chicken, pork, seafood, and seasonal vegetables
- Ingredients generally used: Egg, flour, and panko
- Variations: Osaka, Tokyo, Nagoya

Kushikatsu (串カツ), also known as kushiage (串揚げ), is a Japanese dish of deep-fried skewered meat and vegetables. In Japanese, kushi (串) refers to the skewers used while katsu means a deep-fried cutlet of meat.

== Ingredients ==
Kushikatsu can be made with chicken, pork, seafood, and seasonal vegetables. These are skewered on bamboo kushi, then dipped in seasoned flour, egg wash, and panko and deep-fried in vegetable oil. They may be served alone or with tonkatsu sauce.

Meat
beef (gyūniku), pork meat (butaniku) and cartilage (nankotsu), sausage, chicken parts including tsukune (minced chicken), gizzard (sunagimo), skin (torikawa), and horse meat (baniku), chicken egg and Japanese quail egg
Seafood
Atlantic horse mackerel (aji), Japanese smelt-whitings (kisu), shishamo smelt, wakasagi blackwater smelt, prawn and shrimp (ebi), Japanese scallop (hotate or kaibashira), oyster (kaki), octopus (tako), squid and cuttlefish (ika)
Vegetable
onion, eggplant (nasu), bamboo shoot (takenoko), okra, tomato, potato, sweet potato, Chinese yam (nagaimo), bell pepper (pīman), lotus root (renkon), greater burdock (gobō), pumpkin (kabocha), broccoli, asparagus, shiitake mushroom, garlic and shishito pepper
Products and prepared
fish products: chikuwa, hanpen and kamaboko
dairy: hard, cream, and smoked cheeses
prepared: bell pepper stuffed with minced pork, asparagus wrapped with bacon strips, chikuwa filled with hard cheese, mochi rice cakes, dumplings including jiaozi (gyōza), shūmai, and beni shōga (pickled ginger root colored bright pink)

== Geographical varieties ==
=== Osaka area ===
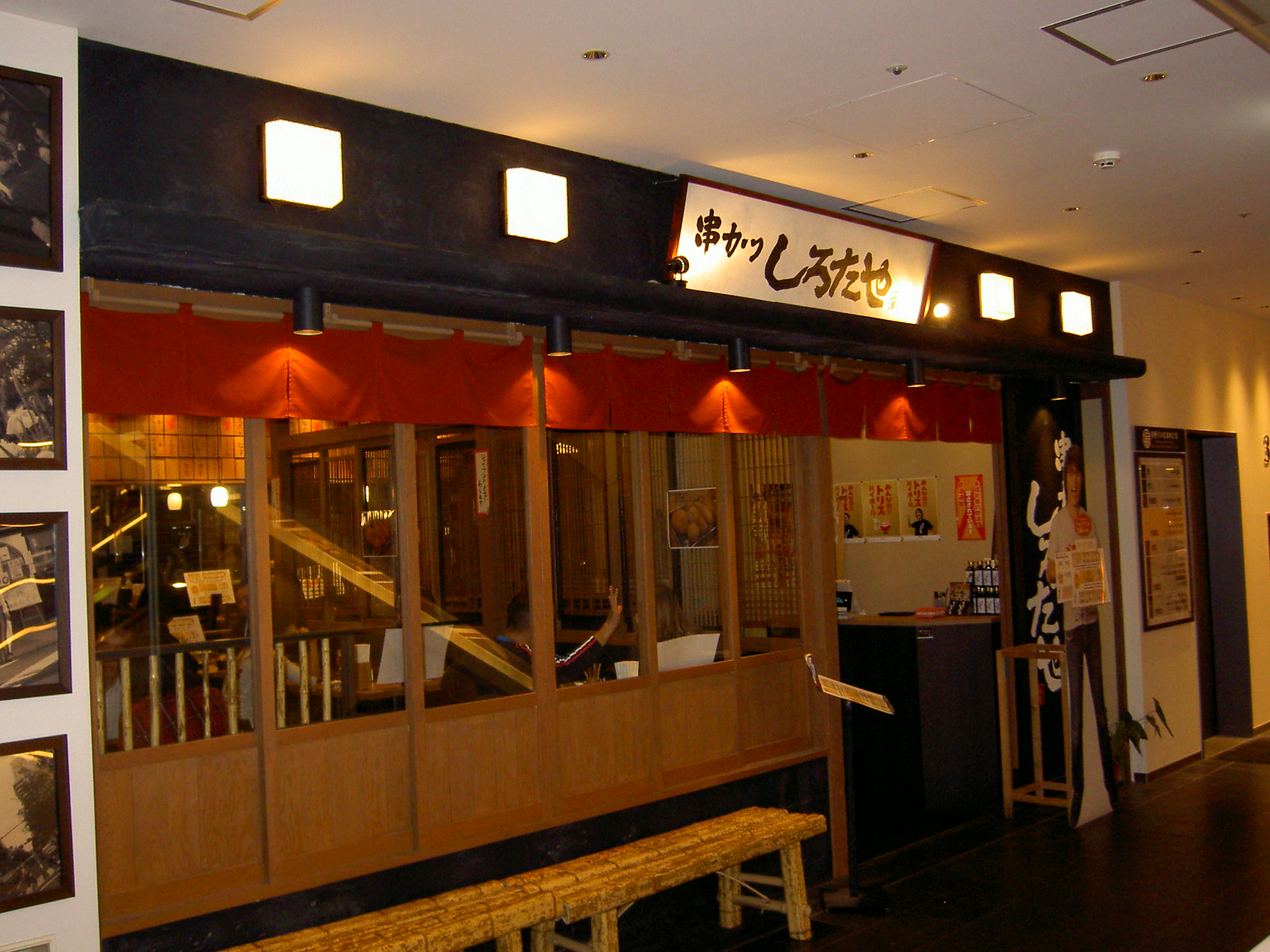
Shirotaya restaurant in Osaka

The origin of kushiage is said to be served at food bars in downtown Osaka, in the Shinsekai neighborhood. Kushikatsu restaurants specialize in the dish. An owner of a small Shinsekai food bar since 1929 is said to be the pioneer cook, and her menu was quite popular among the district of blue-collar workers. She prepared and deep-fried meat on skewers, which was a kind of fast food handy to eat, not costly, and filling.

As that menu spread to other areas of Osaka and beyond, it is standard that kushikatsu are prepared with a single food—not like that in Tokyo where, for example, they alternately put pork and onion on a skewer. Wider varieties of foods were prepared as the menu developed, unlike those in Nagoya or Tokyo—for instance, thin slices of pickled ginger or sausage by itself.

Generally speaking, the food on a skewer is smaller in Osaka-style kushikatsu, and customers tend to order larger numbers of kushi compared to Tokyo or Nagoya. That encouraged many kushiage restaurants to use a premixed "batter flour" of powdered egg and flour (compared to that in Tokyo or Nagoya where batter is prepared with fresh egg, water and flour topped with panko crusts). High-end kushiage restaurants in Osaka serve kushikatsu in Tokyo-Nagoya style. Grated yam is added for softer texture. New types of kushikatsu restaurants serve fondue-style kushikatsu, in which customers fry kushi at the table in a deep pan with cooking oil. Kushinobō is a typical high-end Osaka-style kushiage restaurant with franchises across Japan, and it is appreciated for its unique serving style — until a customer informs staff that they are full and do not need any more, staff continues to bring variations of kushiage to the table.

=== Tokyo area ===
The basic kushikatsu in Kanto eastern Japan area including Tokyo is made with diced pork rib in 3–4 cm (1.5 in) cubes, skewered with sliced onions or leeks. Battered with fresh egg, flour and a thin layer of panko crust, the skewer is deep-fried in vegetable oil — cottonseed, soybean, canola or rapeseed oil. At the table, skewers are seasoned with thick brown sauce, sweeter than Worcestershire sauce, with mustard if provided in the cruet stand.

=== Nagoya area ===
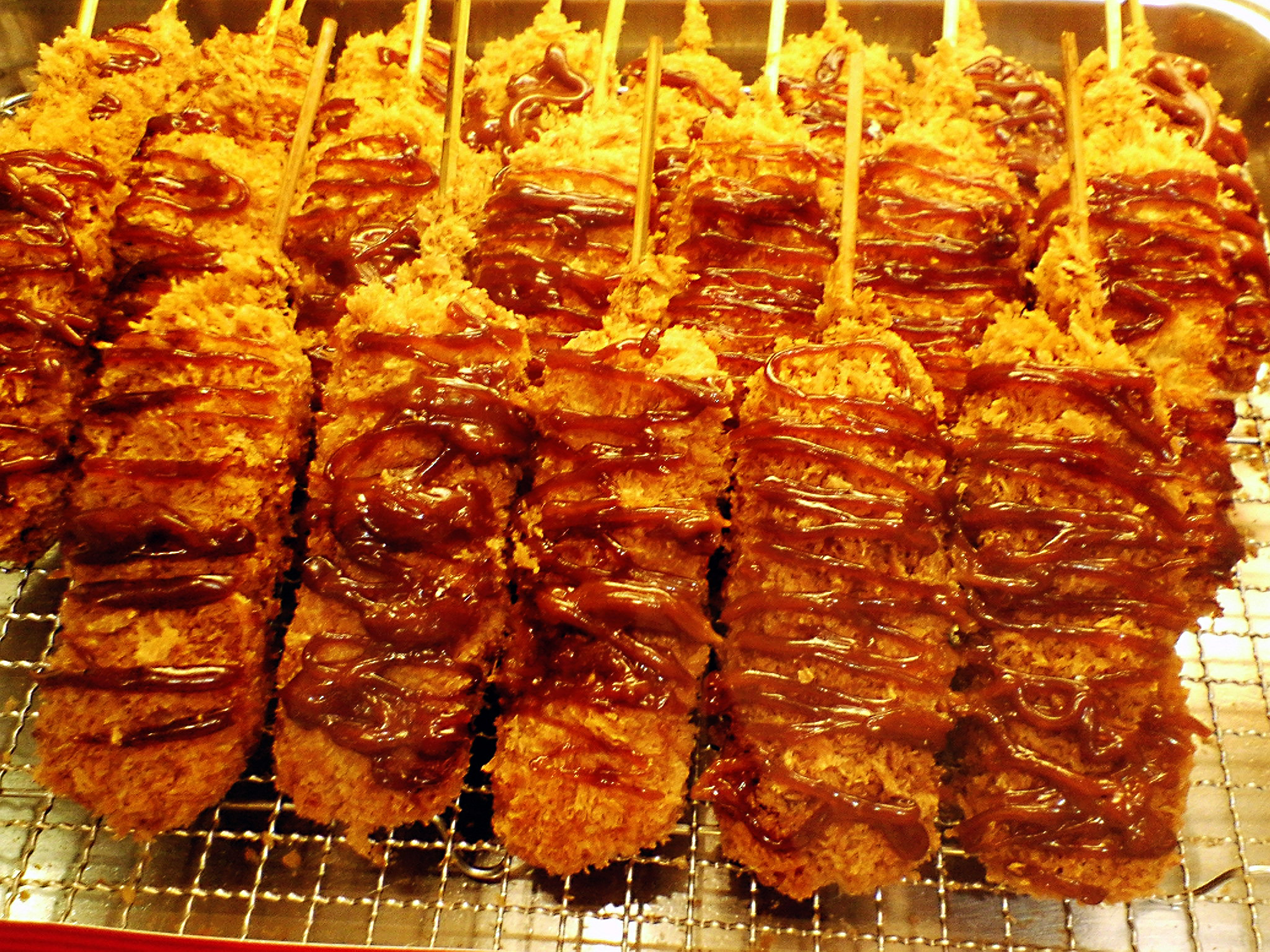
Miso kushikatsu, kushikatsu with miso sauce, originated in the Nagoya region.

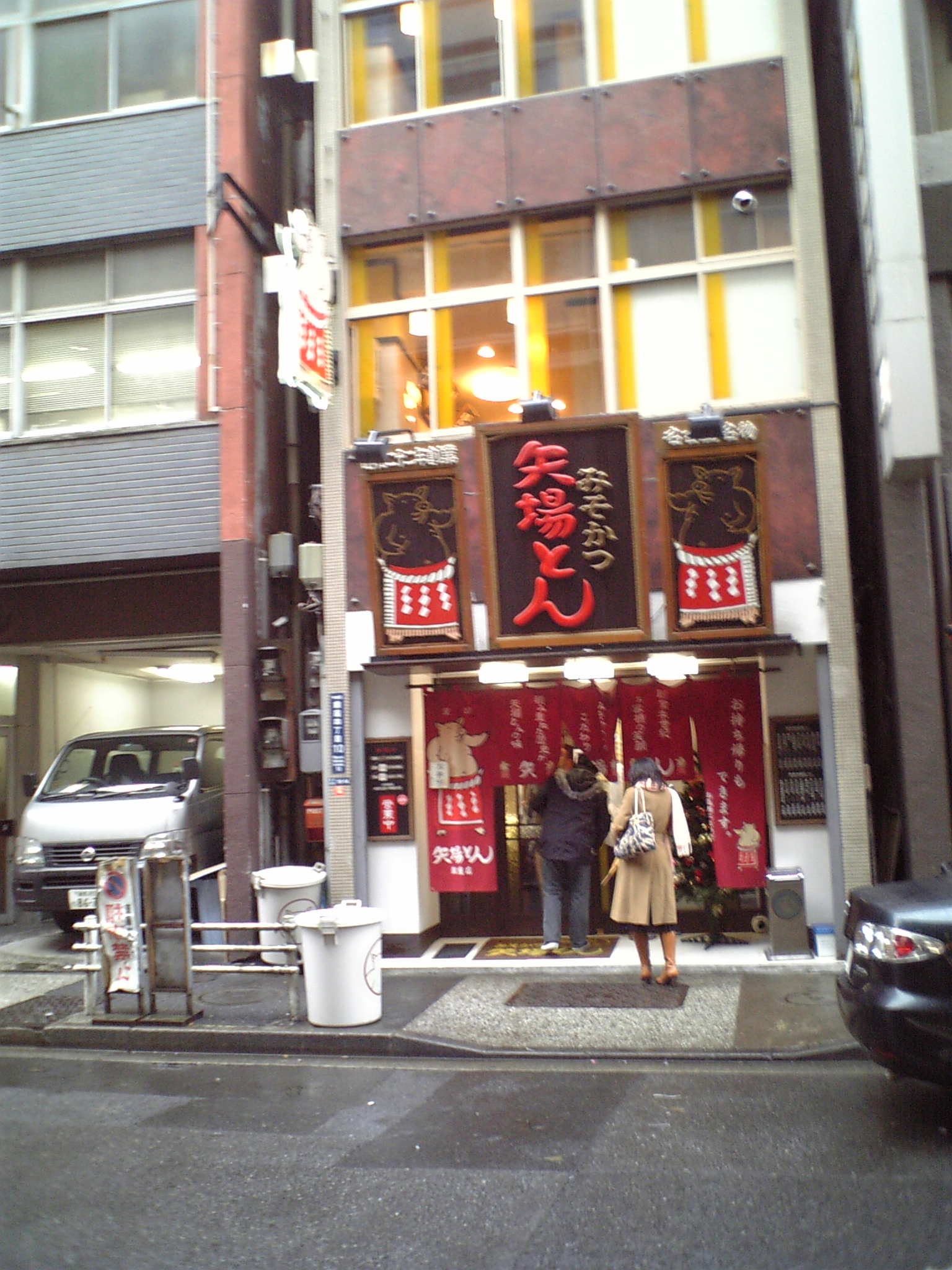
Yabaton, a Nagoya-style miso katsu restaurant in Ginza

In Nagoya and its surrounding cities, they serve the local specialty doteni, and have an option to order kushikatsu with it. Unlike the serving style in Osaka and Tokyo, in Nagoya they dip kushikatsu in the thick sauce they grilled and sauteed beef sinew. That sauce is based on hatcho-miso, and the kushikatsu is called miso katsu.

== Other varieties ==
Sophisticated sauces are prepared in suburban areas of other cities including Nishinomiya and Kobe, and several sauces are served along with kushikatsu course. Plain salt, soy sauce, sesame oil and ketchup along with tartar sauce, miso, mayonnaise and other dip-style sauce could be the speciality of each restaurant.

== Eating etiquette ==
Eating style is unique at kushikatsu restaurants and food bars as kushikatsu is dipped into a pot of thinner sauce before eating. As a sauce pot is shared among customers, reinserting food after a bite is seen as bad manners and unsanitary. Instead, a slice of cabbage is used to scoop up sauce from the pot and pour it onto the kushikatsu. Some restaurants put a brush or spoon at the shared pot to season the kushi.

Some kushiyaki restaurants have a menu and instructions in English and other languages to warn travelers not to dip food into the shared sauce pot after biting it. (Note: 新世界：外国人も「2度漬け禁止」 a warning article was published on mainstream newspaper.)

== Children's songs ==
A comic kushikatsu song titled "Kushikatsu wa ippon" became popular to the generation born in 1990s as they enjoyed the song in children's song program on TV broadcast.

- "Kushikatsuwa ippon" (Single Kushikatsu Skewer), broadcast on NHK channel (Note: Young mothers and their children enjoyed singing the song "Kushikatsuwa ippon" during the young children's program Okāsan to Issho (With your mother), a hallmark program NHK TV runs from the 1970s. An anthology of songs were recorded later on DVD.)
- "Daruma no Ossan no Uta - sōsu no nidozuke wa kinshi ya de" (Song dedicated to Mr. Darma - never dip your kushikatsu twice in the sauce pot) (Note: An old kushikatsu restaurant Darma closed as Mr. Darma, the owner, decided to retire. Kamon dedicated a song to him.)

== See also ==
- List of deep-fried foods
- Kebab
