= Whitebait (disambiguation) =

Whitebait is a collective term for the juvenile of various fish species worldwide.

Whitebait (disambiguation) may refer to:

- Whitebait Smelt (Allosmerus elongatus), a species of smelt that lives off the west coast of North America
- Operation Whitebait, an air attack on Berlin during the Second World War

== See also ==
- WhitebaitMedia
