= Donald McAllister =

Donald or Don McAllister may refer to:

- Don McAllister, footballer
- Donald McAllister (cricketer), Australian cricketer
- Don McAllister (publisher)
- Donald Evan McAllister, Canadian ichthyologist

== See also ==
- Donald MacAlister, physician and Chancellor of Glasgow University
