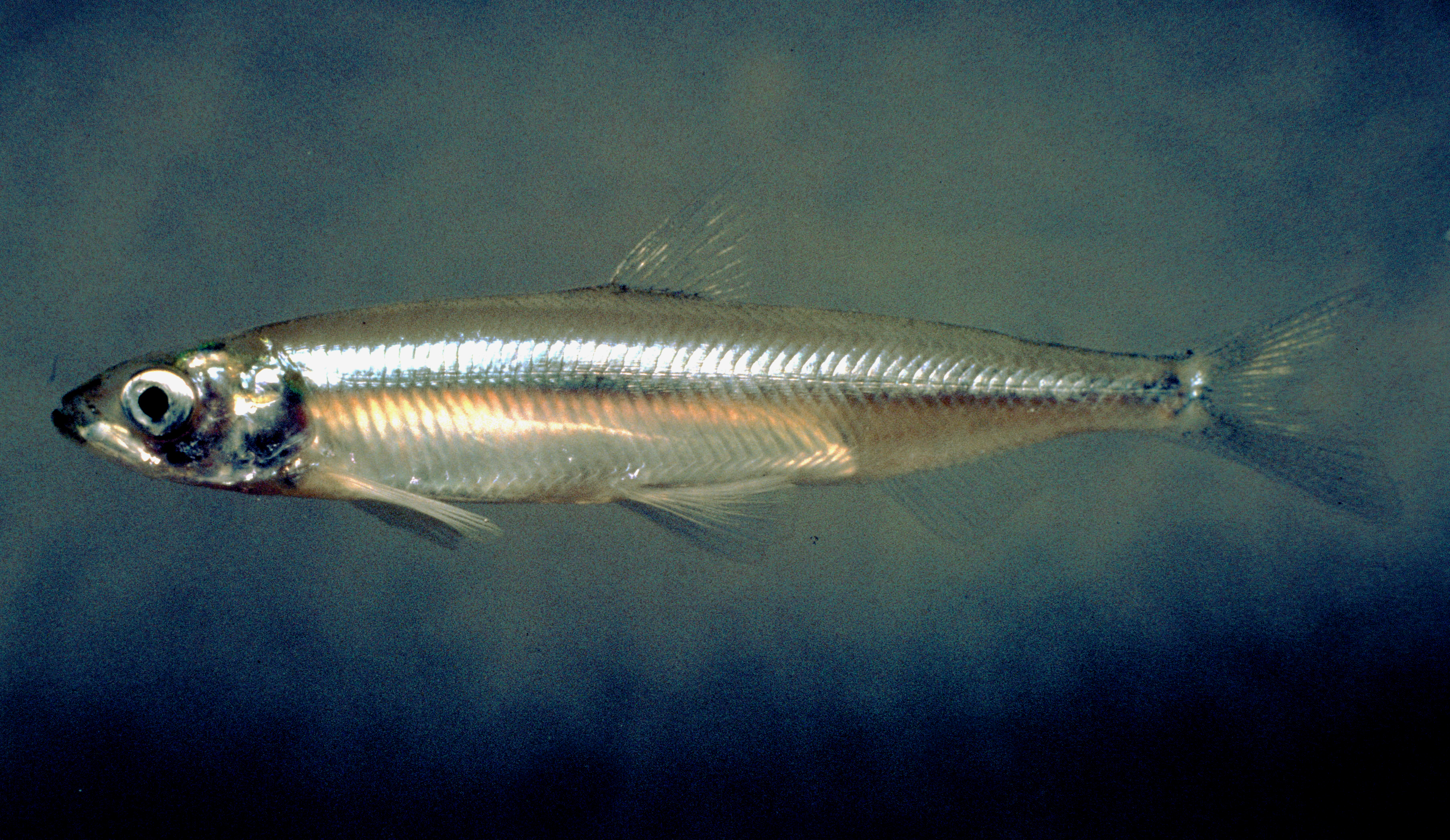
- Delta smelt, Hypomesus transpacificus

Scientific classification
- Kingdom: Animalia
- Phylum: Chordata
- Class: Actinopterygii
- Order: Osmeriformes
- Family: Osmeridae
- Genus: Hypomesus; T. N. Gill, 1862

= Hypomesus =

Hypomesus Temporal range: 28–0 Ma Late Oligocene to Present

Genus of fishes

Hypomesus is a genus of smelts (Osmeridae), consisting of five species found in the northern hemisphere.

== Genomics ==
A chromosome-level genome assembly of Hypomesus nipponensis was published in 2026, representing a high-quality reference genome for the genus. The genome is approximately 708 Mb in size, assembled into 28 chromosomes, with a BUSCO completeness of 97.3%, and 24,102 protein-coding genes were predicted.

== Species ==
There are currently five recognized species in this genus:

- Hypomesus japonicus (Brevoort, 1856)
- Hypomesus nipponensis McAllister, 1963 (Japanese smelt)
- Hypomesus olidus (Pallas, 1814) (Pond smelt)
- Hypomesus pretiosus (Girard, 1854) (Surf smelt)
- Hypomesus transpacificus McAllister, 1963 (Delta smelt)

The pond smelt H. olidus is widespread across northeastern Asia, Alaska, and northwestern Canada, while the Delta smelt H. transpacificus is an endangered species of the Sacramento Delta in California. H. chishimaensis was at one time thought to be a separate species, but has since been identified as a population of H. nipponensis.

Hypomesus

- - - H. olidus
    - H. nipponensis
  - - H. japonicus
    - - H. pretiosus
      - H. transpacificus

Phylogeny of the genus Hypomesus including H. chishimaensis under H. nipponensis.
