= Enoplophthalmus =

Enoplophthalmus Temporal range: Early Oligocene to Early Miocene

Scientific classification
- Kingdom: Animalia
- Phylum: Chordata
- Class: Actinopterygii
- Order: Osmeriformes
- Family: Osmeridae
- Genus: †Enoplophthalmus; Sauvage, 1880

Type species
- †Enoplophthalmus schlumbergeri Sauvage, 1880

Species
- †E. alsaticus Gaudant, 1984; †E. rhenanus (Weiler, 1963); †E. robustus (Weiler, 1963); †E. schlumbergeri Sauvage, 1880

Extinct genus of fishes

Enoplophthalmus is an extinct genus of prehistoric freshwater smelt that inhabited Europe during the Oligocene and early Miocene epoches, from the Rupelian to the Aquitanian. It appears to be closely related to the modern capelin (Mallotus villosus). Until the description of the Paleocene-aged Speirsaenigma from Canada, it was the oldest known fossil smelt genus.

The following species are known:

- †E. alsaticus Gaudant, 1984 - Early Oligocene of France (Pechelbronn Formation), potentially late Oligocene of Armenia
- †E. rhenanus (Weiler, 1963) - Early Miocene (Aquitanian) of Germany (Hydrobienkalk Formation)
- †E. robustus (Weiler, 1963) - Early Miocene (Aquitanian) of Germany (Hydrobienkalk Formation)
- †E. schlumbergeri Sauvage, 1880 (type species) - Early Oligocene of France (Calcaires de Campagne-Calavon)

Indeterminate otoliths of this genus are known from Romania.

Alongside Dapalis, Enoplopthalmus appears to have been one of the dominant freshwater fishes that inhabited Europe during the late Paleogene and early Neogene. Uniquely, Enoplopthalmus is most closely related to capelin, a fish of northern temperate and Arctic affinities, while Dapalis was related to the glassfishes, which are a mainly tropical group today. This indicates that there was significantly less provincialism in fish distribution during the mid-Cenozoic, allowing for these now widely separated groups to coexist.

== See also ==
- Prehistoric fish
- List of prehistoric bony fish
