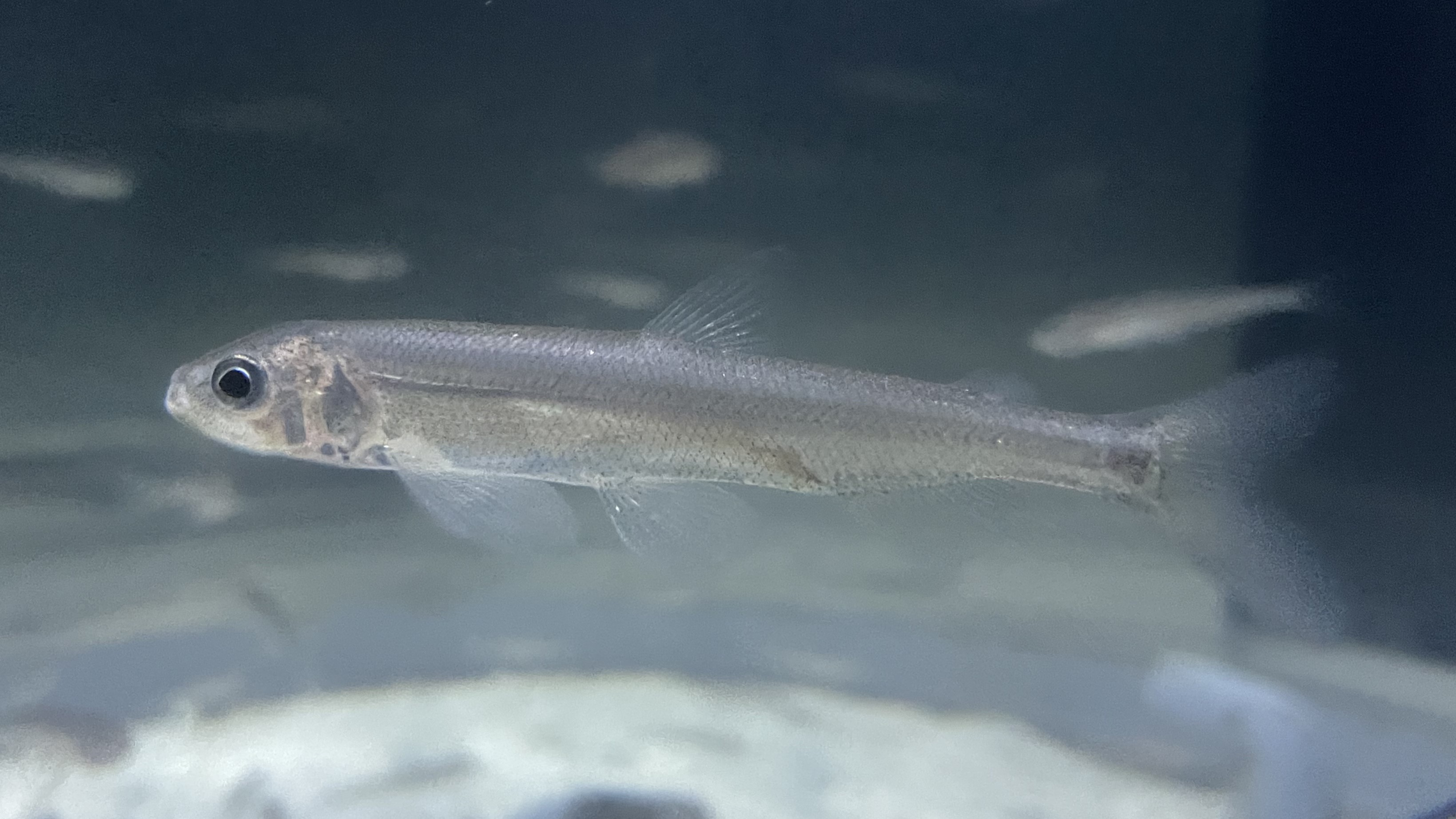
- Shishamo exhibited at Chitose Aquarium

Scientific classification
- Kingdom: Animalia
- Phylum: Chordata
- Class: Actinopterygii
- Division: Teleostei
- Order: Osmeriformes
- Family: Osmeridae
- Genus: Spirinchus
- Species: S. lanceolatus

Binomial name
- Spirinchus lanceolatus (Hikita, 1913)

= Shishamo =

Species of fish

Shishamo (柳葉魚; literally "willow leaf fish"), or Spirinchus lanceolatus, is an anadromous smelt native to Hokkaido, Japan.

== Description ==
This fish averages 15 centimeters in length, with a maximum recorded length of 70 cm. It is generally dark on the back with a silver-white underside. It is distributed only along the Pacific coastal regions of Hokkaido, from Uchiura Bay to the coast of Akkeshi..

== Etymology ==
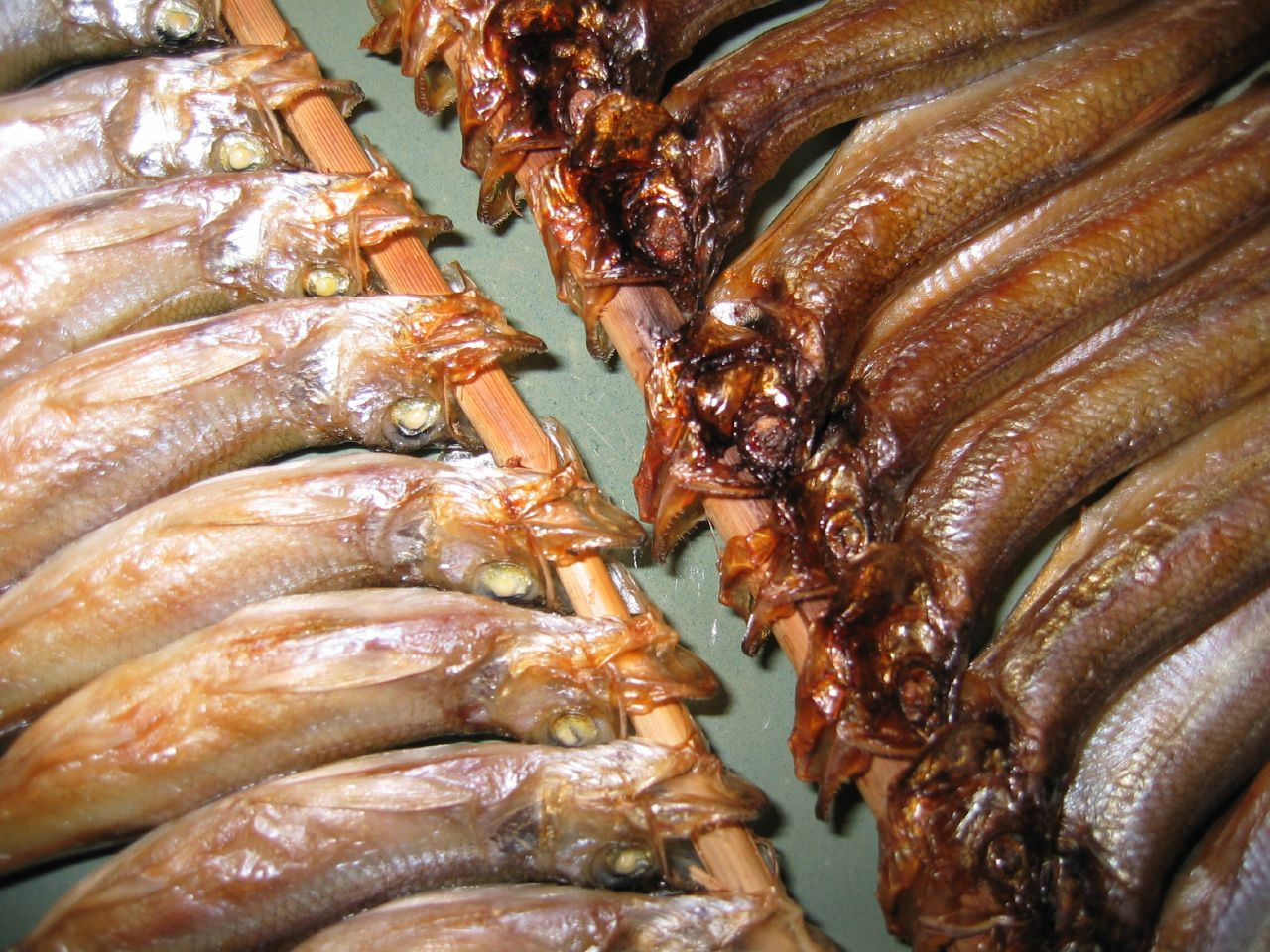
Shishamo in Hokkaido

The fish is said to resemble a willow leaf, and its Japanese name reflects this; shishamo, is derived from the Ainu name for the same fish, susam, which is supposed to be derived from a compound of Ainu susu "willow" + ham "leaf", hence its name in Chinese characters (柳葉魚 jukujikun, where the characters have no phonetic relation to the word).

== Food use ==
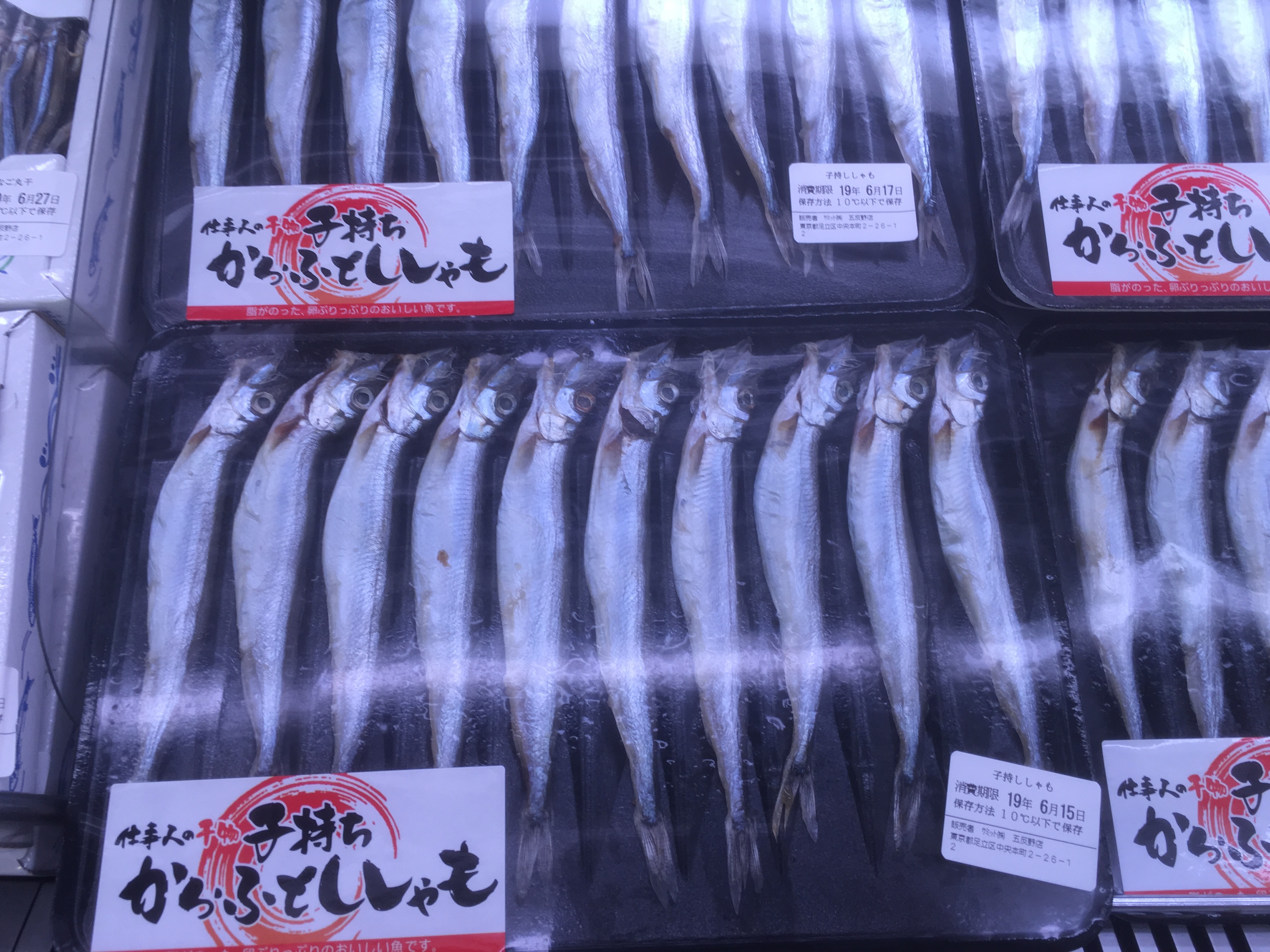
Karafuto Shishamo sold in Tokyo

In Japanese cuisine, this fish is grilled or fried whole and served with its roe intact. The roe takes up most of the fish's body.

The total 2021 catch in Kushiro, where 85% of Japanese shishamo are caught, was 124 tons - a reduction of 50% compared to the year before. Due to declining catches in recent years, attempts have been made to commercially farm the fish in Japan. In recent years capelin (Mallotus villosus) has appeared on the market with the name "Karafuto shishamo." Approximately 20,000 tons are imported to Japan annually.

== Ecology ==
This species migrates upstream from October through December each year in order to spawn, when females of the species lay adhesive eggs on pebbles along the riverbed. The number of fertilized eggs produced is correlated with the length of the parent fish, with larger fish laying more eggs, typically around 4000-10000. Shishamo mostly spawn in areas where the flow velocity at the riverbed is less than 0.6m/s.
