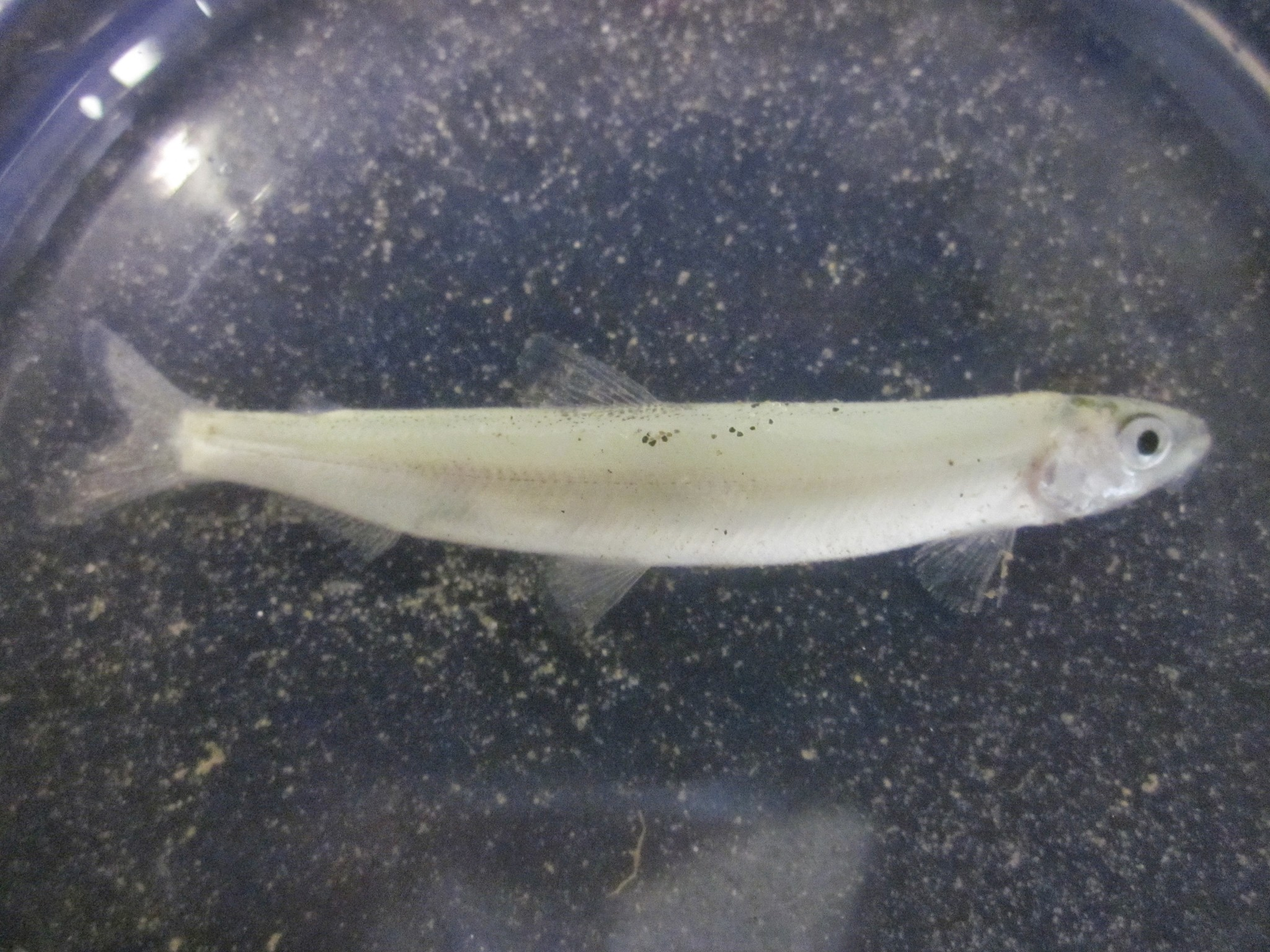

Scientific classification
- Kingdom: Animalia
- Phylum: Chordata
- Class: Actinopterygii
- Order: Osmeriformes
- Family: Osmeridae
- Genus: Hypomesus
- Species: H. pretiosus

Binomial name
- Hypomesus pretiosus (Girard, 1854)

= Hypomesus pretiosus =

Surf smelt

Species of fish

Hypomesus pretiosus, or surf smelt, is a marine smelt with a range from Prince William Sound, Alaska to Long Beach, California, although its population declines south of San Francisco. The surf smelt grows to be about 10 inches in southern waters, and 8 3/4 inches in northern waters near Canada. On average, surf smelt weigh about 10 to the pound.

Spawning occurs in the nighttime, which is why it is sometimes called the night smelt, peaking in the months from May to October. With a maximum age of three to four years, some females will spawn at the age of one, and all will spawn at the age of two. Females lay from 1,500–36,000 sticky eggs in the surf zone per spawn, which they may do three to five or more times in a season.

H. pretiosus feed on polychaete worms, larval fish and jellyfish, but they primarily feed on small crustaceans. They can be important parts of salmon and halibut diets, and are the most economically important fish among California smelts. Around 225,000 kilograms are harvested there every year.
