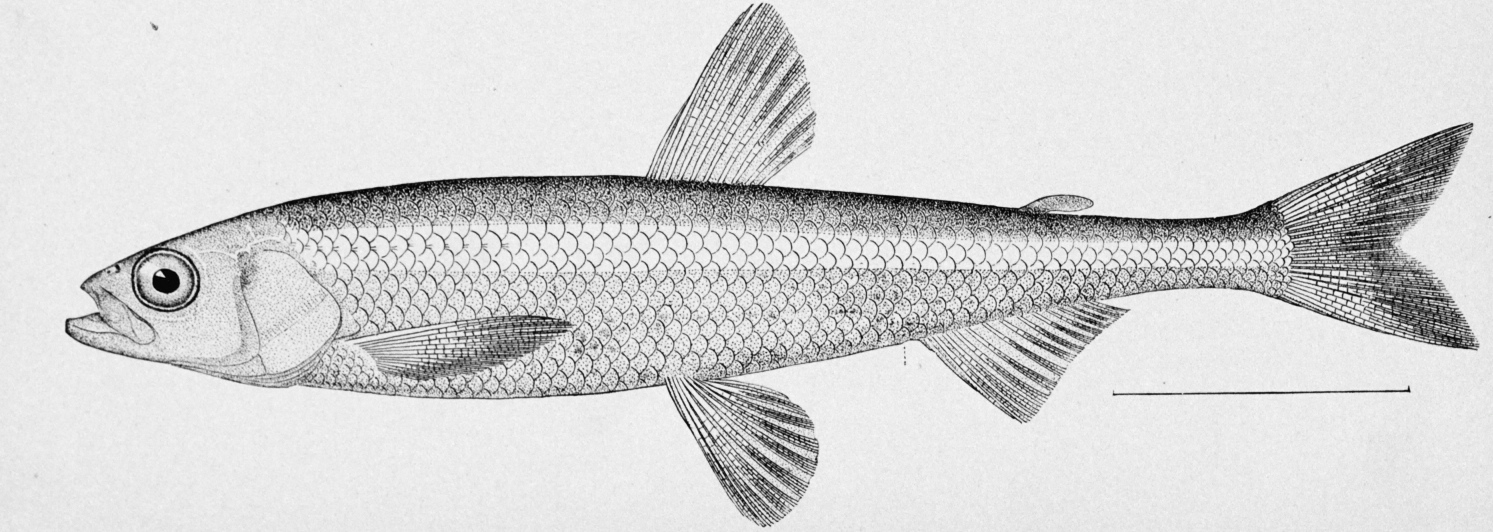
- Illustration of a pond smelt

Scientific classification
- Kingdom: Animalia
- Phylum: Chordata
- Class: Actinopterygii
- Order: Osmeriformes
- Family: Osmeridae
- Genus: Allosmerus; C. L. Hubbs, 1925
- Species: A. elongatus

Binomial name
- Allosmerus elongatus (Ayres, 1854)

= Allosmerus =

Whitebait smelt

Genus of fishes

Allosmerus is a monotypic genus of smelt. Its sole species, Allosmerus elongatus, the whitebait smelt, is an uncommon Northeast Pacific smelt, about which little is known. Originally described as both Osmerus attenuatus and O. elongatus, these two species were determined to be conspecific in 1946. The fish can grow from 7–9 inches (18–23 cm) in length, has large eyes, a greenish-gray color on its back, and a silver band along its sides. Unlike most other smelt species which generally have no enlarged teeth in the roof of their mouth, the whitebait has single large tooth in the center of its vomer, which is sometimes flanked by a smaller tooth on either side. The adult males of the species have a longer anal fin.

Their range extends from Vancouver Island to San Francisco, California, although one fish has been found as far south as San Pedro, California, a specimen which may have been released as live bait. Often abundant in bay areas, whitebait are known to spawn on subtidal sandbanks and swim in schools. The fish has fairly minor economic importance; it serves as food for larger fish, and is netted by some fishermen during the spring and summer to be used as bait.
