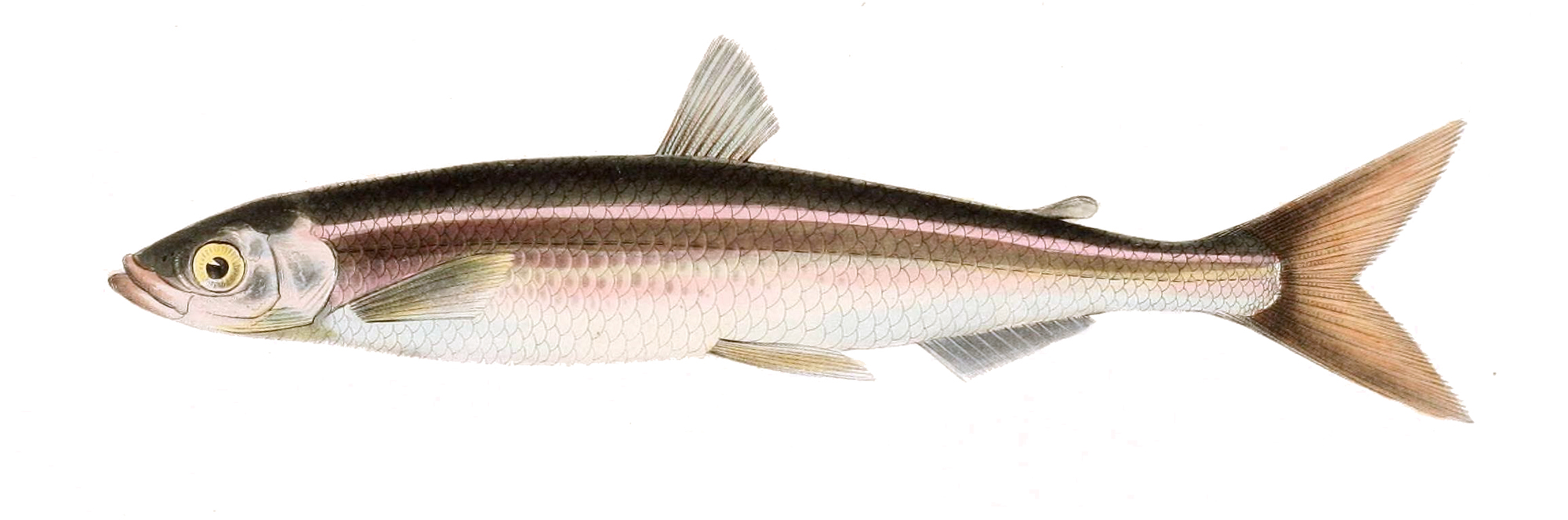

Conservation status
- Least Concern (IUCN 3.1)

Scientific classification
- Kingdom: Animalia
- Phylum: Chordata
- Class: Actinopterygii
- Order: Osmeriformes
- Family: Osmeridae
- Genus: Hypomesus
- Species: H. japonicus

Binomial name
- Hypomesus japonicus (Brevoort, 1856)

Synonyms
- Osmerus japonicus Brevoort, 1856

= Hypomesus japonicus =

Hypomesus japonicus,

Species of fish

Hypomesus japonicus, the Japanese smelt, is a coastal fish species of the northwestern Pacific Ocean, ranging from the Korean Peninsula and northern Japan to the Kuril Islands and Peter the Great Bay.

== Size and age ==
The maximum total length is about 25 centimeters, and the maximum weight is about 158 grams. The oldest reported age is 8 years.

== Habitat and reproduction ==
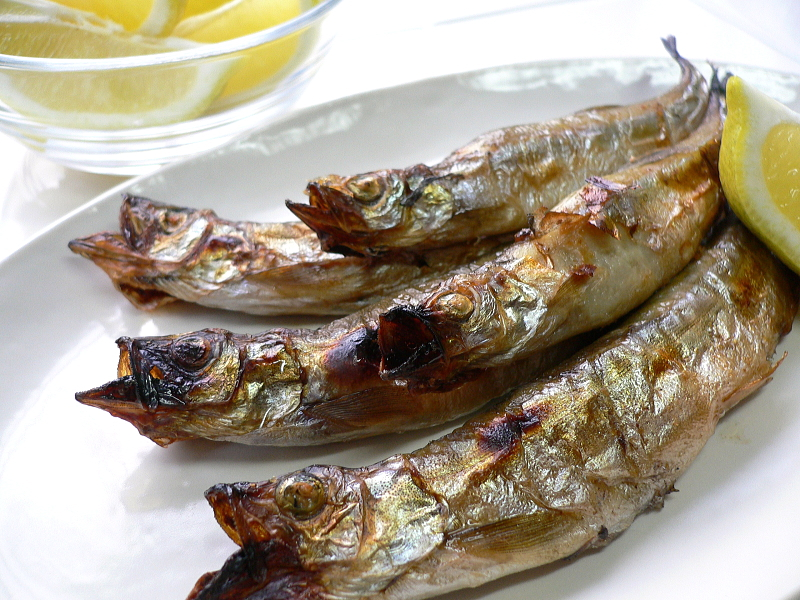
Grilled

Hypomesus japonicus is a marine species that enters freshwater coastal lagoons and estuaries. Spawning occurs in the month of May on beaches. They prefer marine environments but is found near coastlines, with some populations exhibiting variations in habitat characteristics depending on specific regions.

== Morphological Variation ==
Hypomesus japonicus is distinguished from its closely related species, H. nipponensis, by several morphological characteristics. Although both species are commonly referred to as Japanese smelt, they possess clear differences. H. japonicus has a relatively smaller eye diameter, and the heights of its dorsal fin and adipose fin are greater. Notably, this species exhibits morphological variation according to habitat, with individuals from the Russky Island coastline displaying the most pronounced morphological differences when compared to those from Olga Bay and the Terney coastline.
