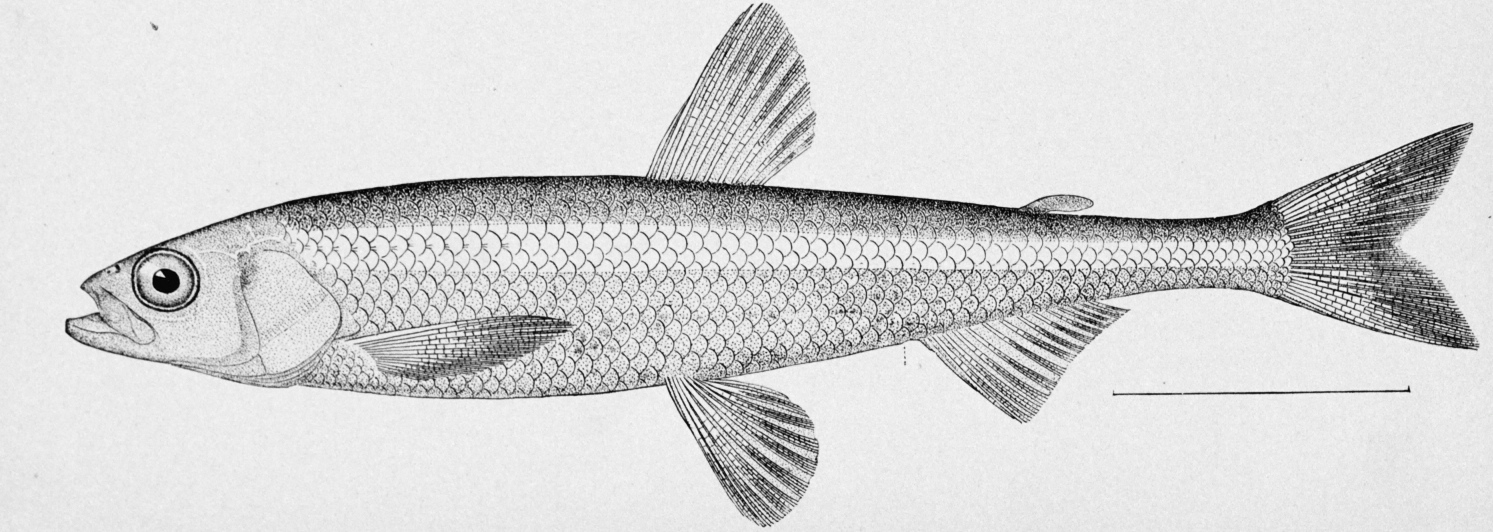

Conservation status
- Least Concern (IUCN 3.1)

Scientific classification
- Kingdom: Animalia
- Phylum: Chordata
- Class: Actinopterygii
- Order: Osmeriformes
- Family: Osmeridae
- Genus: Hypomesus
- Species: H. olidus

Binomial name
- Hypomesus olidus Pallas, 1814

= Pond smelt =

Species of fish

The pond smelt (Hypomesus olidus) is a fresh and brackish water species of smelt. It is found in the East Asia (eastern Siberia, northeast China, Korea, Hokkaido) and the northwestern North America (Alaska, northwestern Canada). It can grow to 20 cm (7.9 in) total length.

== Name ==
In Korea, H. olidus is most commonly known as bing-eo (빙어; 氷魚), meaning 'ice fish', although it has many different names depending on the region or the time period. It is recorded as dong-eo (동어; 凍魚) meaning 'frozen fish' in old literature, while the geography section of the Annals of King Sejong recorded it as gwa-eo (과어; 瓜魚), a local product of what is now the modern-day counties of Chongpyong and Kowon in North Korea; gwa-eo is named so because of its taste and shape resembling that of a melon.

Among its various names, in the provinces of Jeolla and North Chungcheong, as well as the city of Daejeon, it is known as gong-eo (공어; 公魚), in Suwon it is mereuchi (메르치), and in Hwacheon, Gwangju, and Sokcho, it is baeng-eo (뱅어). The name bing-eo is coined by Silhak scholar Seo Yu-gu.

== Description ==
H. olidus has a long and slender body, and there is an adipose fin between the back and the tail fin, which is transparent without patterns. A wide silvery-white vertical stripe runs through the middle of both sides of the body, while there is a dark black vertical line on the side.

During spawning season, which spans from January to June, it moves up from the sea to the river. In 1925, the colonial government of Korea introduced bing-eo from the Ryongheung River (룡흥강; 龍興江), located in South Hamgyong Province, to reservoirs across the country. Well-known habitats include the reservoirs in Jecheon, Jangheung Reservoir in Ganghwa County, Incheon, as well as Soyang Lake, Chuncheon Lake in Chuncheon, Gangwon Province, and Hapcheon Lake in Hapcheong County, South Gyeongsang Province.

It is a popular species in ice-fishing, boasting a soft meat, a mild taste, and no fishy smell. It can be prepared in various ways such as hoe, braised, or marinated.
