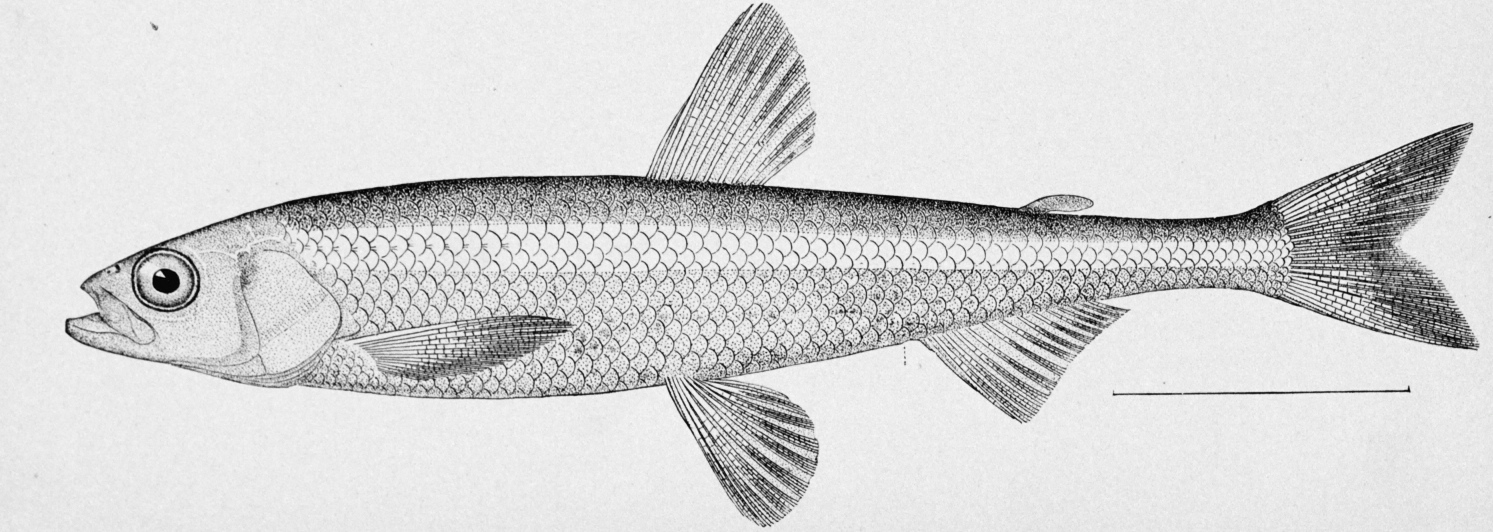
- Pond smelt (Hypomesus olidus)

Scientific classification
- Kingdom: Animalia
- Phylum: Chordata
- Class: Actinopterygii
- Order: Osmeriformes
- Suborder: Osmeroidei
- Family: Osmeridae; Regan, 1913

Genera
- Allosmerus; Hypomesus; Mallotus; Osmerus; Plecoglossus; Spirinchus; Thaleichthys †Enoplophthalmus (fossil) ?†Speirsaenigma (fossil)

= Smelt (fish) =

Smelt Temporal range: Oligocene–present

Family of fishes

Smelts are a family of small fish, the Osmeridae, found in the North Atlantic and North Pacific oceans, as well as rivers, streams and lakes in Europe, North America and Northeast Asia. They are also known as freshwater smelts or typical smelts to distinguish them from the related Argentinidae (herring smelts or argentines), Bathylagidae (deep-sea smelts), and Retropinnidae (Australian and New Zealand smelts).

Some smelt species are common in the North American Great Lakes, and in the lakes and seas of the northern part of Europe, where they run in large schools along the saltwater coastline during spring migration to their spawning streams. In some western parts of the United States, smelt populations have greatly declined in recent decades, leading to their protection under the Endangered Species Act. The Delta smelt (Hypomesus transpacificus) found in the Sacramento Delta of California, and the eulachon (Thaleichthys pacificus) found in the Northeast Pacific and adjacent rivers, are both protected from harvest.

Some species of smelts are among the few fish that sportsmen have been allowed to net, using hand-held dip nets, either along the coastline or in streams. Some sportsmen also ice fish for smelt. They are often fried and eaten whole.

The earliest known fossil smelt is Enoplophthalmus from the Early Oligocene of Europe; Speirsaenigma from the Paleocene of Canada may be an even earlier representative, although some authors instead consider it a relative of the ayu.

== Description ==
In size, most species rarely exceed 20 centimetres (8 in), although some grow larger. Some females of European smelt can reach 25–40 cm (9.8–15.7 in) in length.

Like salmon, many species are anadromous, living most of their lives in the sea, but traveling into fresh water to breed. However, a few exceptions, such as the surf smelt, spend their entire lives at sea.

Family Osmeridae

- Osmeridae
  - - Salangidae, Plecoglossus
    - Hypomesus
    - - Mallotus
      - - Osmerus
        - - Thaleichthys
          - - Allosmerus
            - Spirinchus

Cladogram of the family Osmeridae. Salangidae and Plecoglossus might be sister clades to the osmerid genera.

== Smelt dipping ==
Smelt dipping in the Keweenaw Peninsula in Michigan

In the Canadian provinces and U.S. states around the Great Lakes, "smelt dipping" is a common group sport in the early spring and when stream waters reach around 4 °C (39 °F). Fish are spotted using a flashlight or headlamp and scooped out of the water using a dip net made of nylon or metal mesh. The smelt are cleaned by removing the head and the entrails. Fins, scales, and bones of all but the largest of smelts are cooked without removal.

On the Maine coast, smelts were also a sign of spring, with the run of these small fish up tiny tidal estuaries. Many of these streams were narrow enough for a person to straddle and get a good catch of smelts by dipping a bucket.

== Culinary use ==
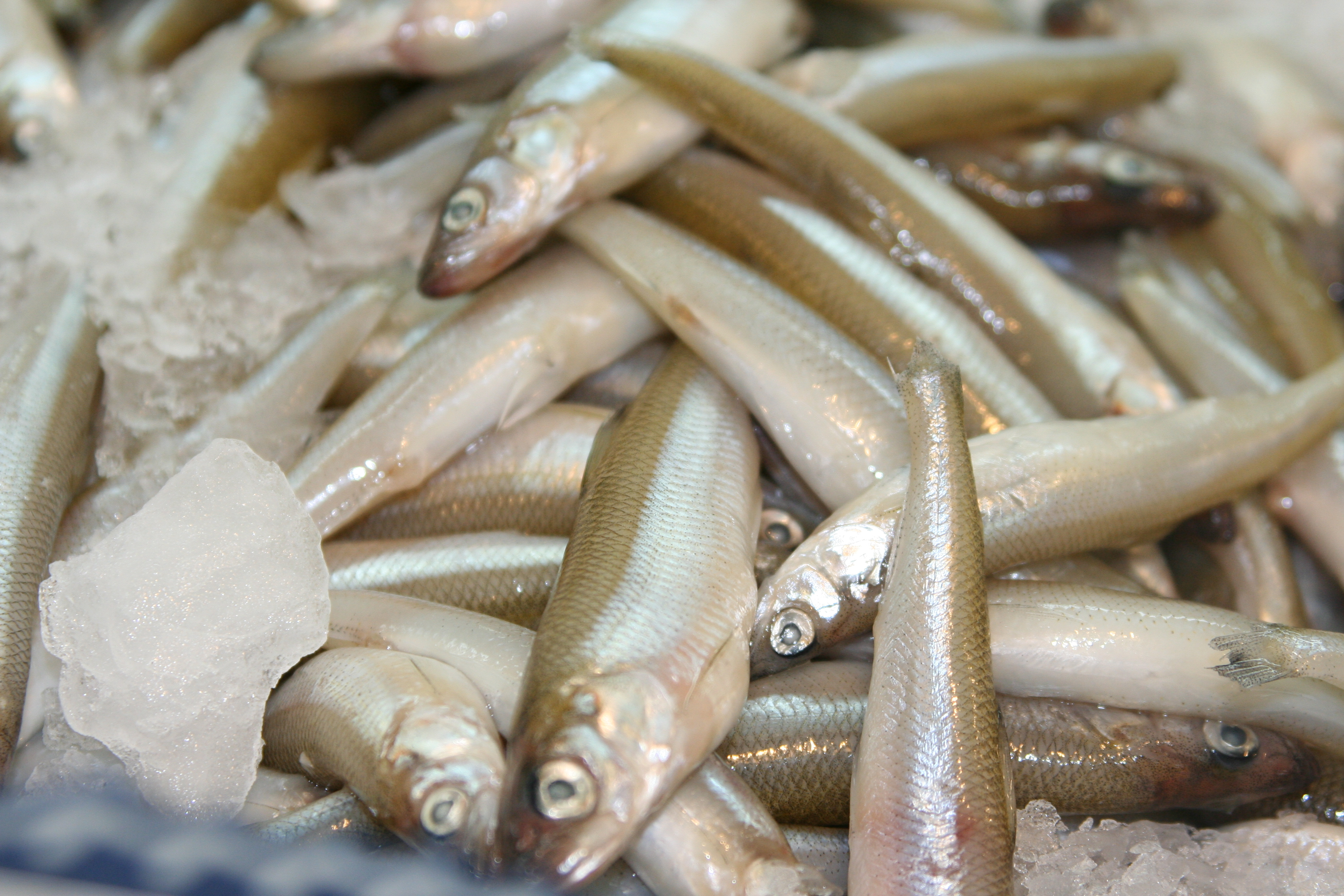
Close-up of smelt for sale at a California seafood market

=== North America ===
Smelts are an important winter catch in the saltwater mouths of rivers in New England and the Maritime Provinces of Canada. Fishermen would historically go to customary locations over the ice using horses and sleighs. Smelt taken out of the cold saltwater were preferred to those taken in warm water. The fish did not command a high price on the market, but provided a source of supplemental income due to their abundance. The smelts were "flash frozen" simply by leaving them on the ice and then sold to fish buyers who came down the rivers.

In the present day, smelts are fished commercially using nets at sea, and for recreation by hand-netting, spearing or angling them through holes in river ice. They are often the target fish of small 'fishing shack' villages that spring up along frozen rivers. Typical ways of preparing them include pan-frying in flour and butter, deep-frying in batter and cooking them, directly out of the water, over small stoves in the shacks.

In January 2025, the smelt gained notoriety after being mentioned by president-elect Donald Trump in a critique of Gavin Newsom, the governor of California during the 2025 California wildfires. In his January 8, 2025 Truth Social post, Trump referred to the smelt as "an essentially worthless fish," and he stated that Newsom blocked the provision of water for drinking purposes and firefighters in order to protect local smelt populations, which ultimately led to raging wildfires and extensive property damage.

==== Canada ====
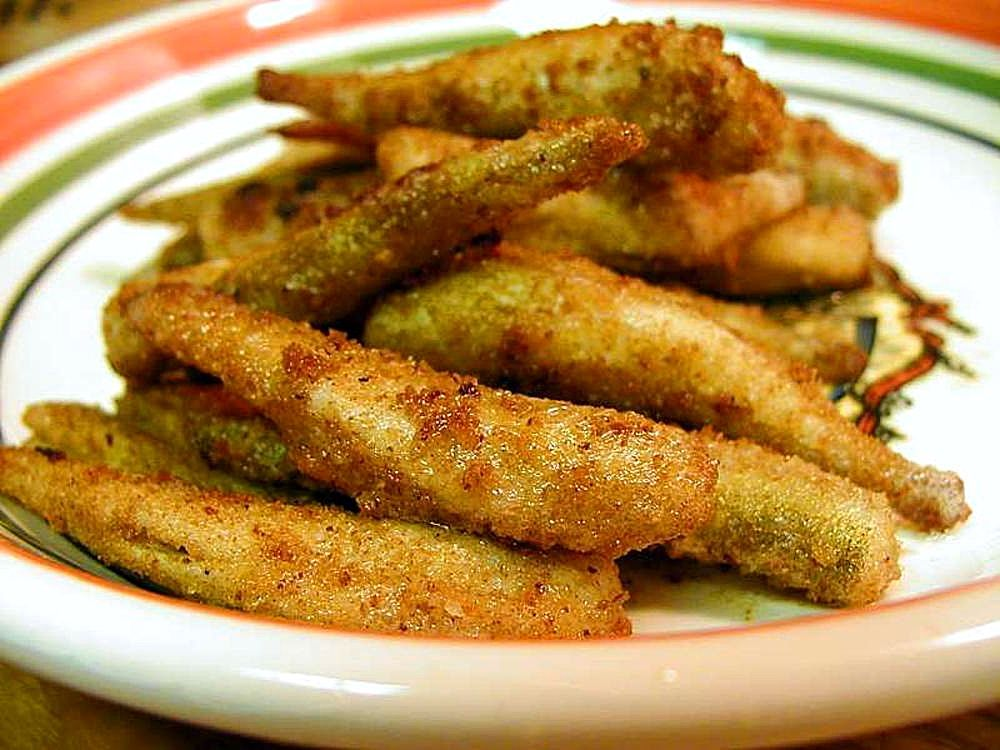
Fried smelt

Indigenous peoples in Canada native to the Great Lakes regions (Lake Huron, Lake Ontario, and Lake Superior), as well as nearby Lake Erie (which still is well known for its smelts today), were both familiar and partially dependent upon smelts as a dietary source of protein and omega fats that didn't require a large effort or hunting party to obtain. Smelts are one of the best choices of freshwater and saltwater fish to eat, as one of the types of edible fish with the lowest amount of mercury.

Smelts can be found in the Atlantic and Pacific oceans, as well as in some freshwater lakes across Canada. Smelts were eaten by many different native peoples who had access to them. One popular way that First Nations of the Pacific coast made dried smelts more appealing was to serve it with oil. Eulachon, a type of smelt, contains so much oil during spawning that, once dried, it can literally be burned like a candle; hence its common nickname of the "candlefish".

Today, there are numerous recipes and methods of preparing and cooking smelts. A popular First Nations recipe calls for the removal of all the fishes' bones, uses canola or peanut oil for frying, and has a breaded-like coating mixed with lemon juice and grated parmesan cheese (with a few other basic ingredients) to coat the smelts prior to frying them.

=== East Asia ===
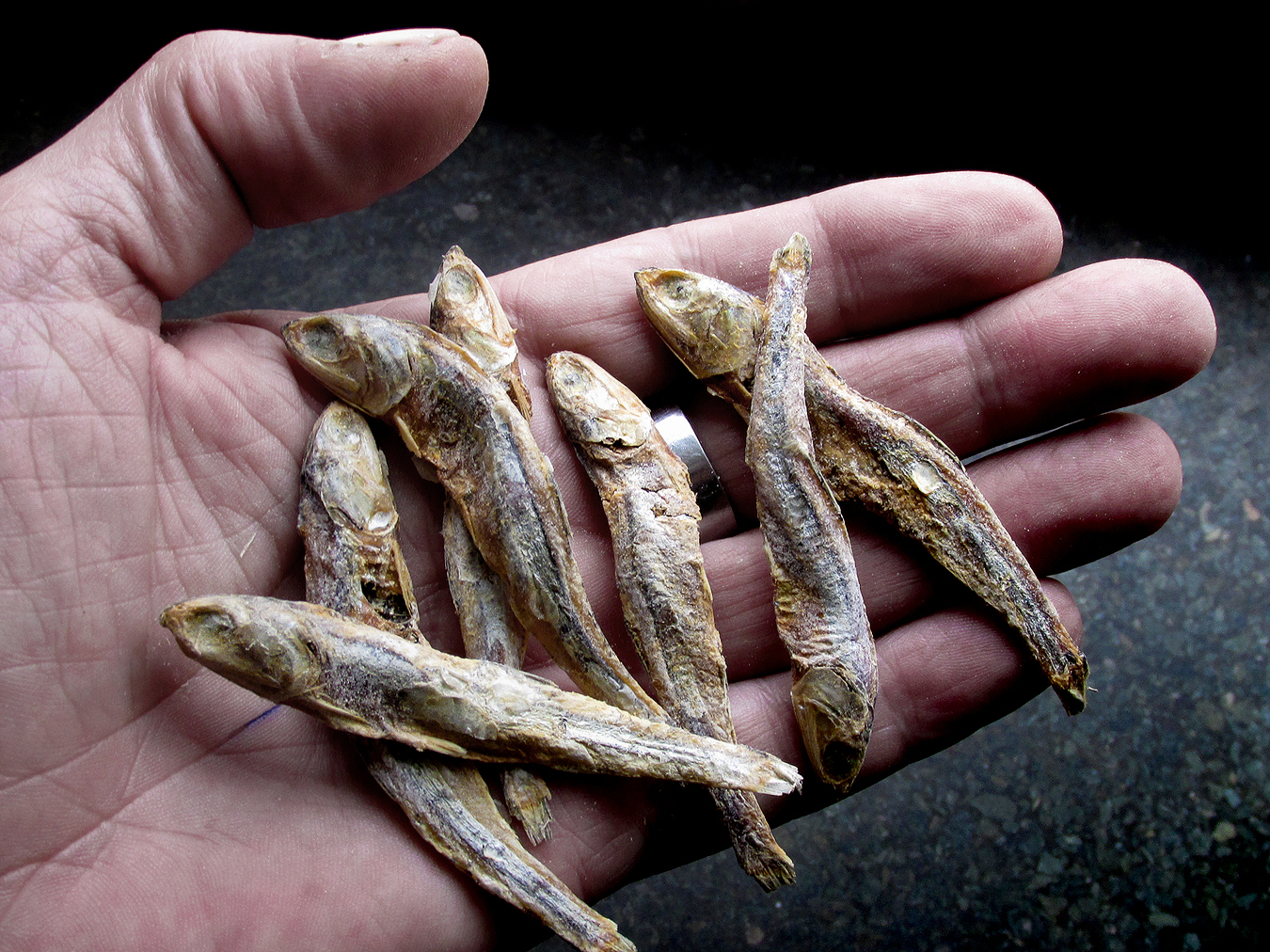
Dried smelt

Smelt is popular in Japan, as the species Sprinchus lanceolatus, and is generally served grilled, called shishamo, especially when full of eggs.

Smelt roe, specifically from capelin, called masago in Japanese, is yellow to orange in color and is often used in sushi.

Smelt is also served in Chinese dim sum restaurants where it is deep fried with the heads and tails attached, identified as duō chūn yú (多春魚) or duō luǎn yú (多卵魚), "many egg fish" or which loosely translates as "fish with many eggs".

Smelt is one of the prime fish species eaten in Tamil Nadu as Nethili fry, Nethili karuvadu (dried fish), coastal Karnataka, especially in Mangalore and Udupi regions, usually fried with heads and tailed removed or in curries. They are called 'Bolingei' (ಬೊಳಂಜೆ) in Kannada and Tulu and 'MotiyaLe' in Konkani.

== Festivals ==
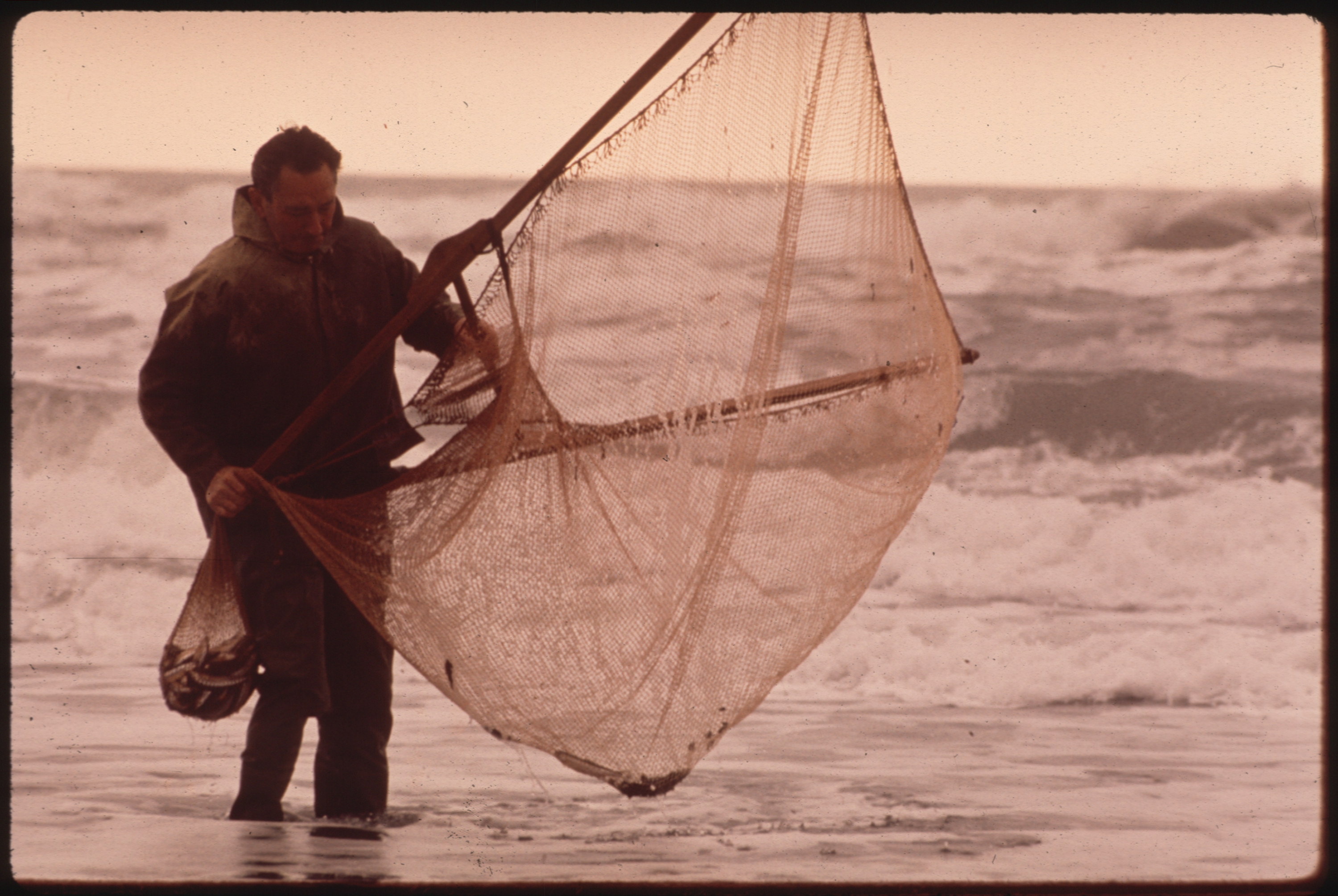
Fishing for smelt, Gold Bluffs Beach, Orick, California, 1972

In the city of Inje, South Korea (Gangwon Province), an Ice Fishing Festival is held annually from 30 January to 2 February on Soyang Lake, coinciding with the smelt's yearly run into fresh water to spawn. They are locally known as bing-eo (빙어) and typically eaten alive or deep-fried.

In Finland, the province of Paltamo has yearly Norssikarnevaali festivals in the middle of May.

For some Italians, especially from the region of Calabria, fried smelts are a traditional part of the Christmas Eve dinner consisting of multiple courses of fish.

In 1956, the Chamber of Commerce in Kelso, Washington, declared Kelso, located on the Cowlitz River, as the "Smelt Capital of the World". They erected billboards proclaiming this, and held festivals for the annual smelt runs until the runs dried up.

The village of Lewiston, New York, on the lower portion of the Niagara River, celebrates an annual two-day smelt festival the first weekend in May. During the festival, approximately 160 kilograms (350 pounds) of smelt are battered and fried at the Lewiston Waterfront. The smelt samples are free during the festival and donations are welcome, as they help support programs supported by the Niagara River Anglers. The festival has a motto, which is a play on words: "Lewiston never smelt so good."

Lithuania celebrates an annual weekend smelt festival in Palanga "Palangos Stinta" early every January.

The American Legion Post 82, in Port Washington, Wisconsin, has been hosting its annual Smelt Fry since 1951. Located on the Western shore of Lake Michigan, 35 miles (56 km) north of Milwaukee, Port Washington has a long history as a fishing community with commercial and sports ventures. The Legion's Smelt Fry happens every year in mid to late April. In mid-July, the quaint town hosts their Fish Day event, billed as "The world's largest, one-day, outdoor fish fry!"

At the time of the smelt's spring run in the Neva River at the head of the Gulf of Finland on the Baltic Sea in Saint Petersburg, a Smelt Festival (Prazdnik koryushki) is celebrated.

The Magic Smelt Puppet Troupe of Duluth, Minnesota has held an annual "Run, Smelt, Run!" puppet-based second line parade, smelt fry, and dance party since 2012. The troupe occasionally hosts other performances throughout the year.

== See also ==
- Rainbow smelt
- Pacific rainbow smelt
