= Donald Evan McAllister =

Canadian ichthyologist

- Born: 23 August 1934; Victoria, British Columbia, Canada
- Died: 17 June 2001 (aged 66)
- Scientific career
- Fields: Ichthyology

Donald Evan McAllister was a Canadian ichthyologist who published over 625 scientific papers, books, popular articles and book reviews in his career, which lasted 45 years from 1958 until his early retirement in 1993.
