= List of fishes of Wyoming =

The state of Wyoming, being a land locked state, has a wide variety of freshwater fish in its lakes, rivers, and streams.

Common name		Family	Native	Image
Cutthroat trout	Oncorhynchus clarki	Salmonidae	Yes	
Rainbow trout	Oncorhynchus mykiss	Salmonidae	No	
Golden trout	Oncorhynchus aguabonita	Salmonidae	No	
Brown trout	Salmo trutta	Salmonidae	No	
Brook trout	Salvelinus fontinalis	Salmonidae	No	
Lake trout or mackinaw	Salvelinus namaycush	Salmonidae	No	
Mountain whitefish	Prosopium williamsoni	Salmonidae	Yes	
Kokanee salmon	Oncorhynchus nerka	Salmonidae	No	
Arctic grayling	Thymallus arcticus	Salmonidae	Yes	
Bigmouth shiner	Notropis dorsalis	Cyprinidae	Yes	
Black bullhead	Ameiurus melas	Ictaluridae	Yes	
Bluehead sucker	Catostomus discobolus	Catostomidae	Yes	
Brassy minnow	Hybognathus hankinsoni	Cyprinidae	Yes	
Burbot	Lota lota	Lotidae	Yes	
Central stoneroller	Campostoma anomalum	Cyprinidae	Yes	
Channel catfish	Ictalurus punctatus	Ictaluridae	Yes	
Common shiner	Luxilus cornutus	Cyprinidae	Yes	
Creek chub	Semotilus atromaculatus	Cyprinidae	Yes	
Fathead minnow	Pimephales promelas	Cyprinidae	Yes	
Finescale dace	Chrosomus neogaeus	Cyprinidae	Yes	
Flannelmouth sucker	Catostomus latipinnis	Catostomidae	Yes	
Flathead chub	Platygobio gracilis	Cyprinidae	Yes	
Goldeye	Hiodon alosoides	Hiodontidae	Yes	
Hornyhead chub	Nocomis biguttatus	Cyprinidae	Yes	
Iowa darter	Etheostoma exile	Percidae	Yes	
Johnny darter	Etheostoma nigrum	Percidae	Yes	
Lake chub	Couesius plumbeus	Cyprinidae	Yes	
Leatherside chub	Lepidomeda copei	Cyprinidae	Yes	
Longnose dace	Rhinichthys cataractae	Cyprinidae	Yes	
Longnose sucker	Catostomus catostomus	Catostomidae	Yes	
Mottled sculpin	Cottus bairdii	Cottidae	Yes	
Mountain sucker	Catostomus platyrhynchus	Catostomidae	Yes	
Northern plains killifish	Fundulus kansae	Fundulidae	Yes	
Orangethroat darter	Etheostoma spectabile	Percidae	Yes	
Paiute sculpin	Cottus beldingi	Cottidae	Yes	
Pearl dace	Margariscus margarita	Cyprinidae	Yes	
Plains minnow	Hybognathus placitus	Cyprinidae	Yes	
Plains topminnow	Fundulus sciadicus	Fundulidae	Yes	
Quillback	Carpiodes cyprinus	Catostomidae	Yes	
Red shiner	Cyprinella lutrensis	Cyprinidae	Yes	
Redside shiner	Richardsonius balteatus	Cyprinidae	Yes	
River carpsucker	Carpiodes carpio	Catostomidae	Yes	
Roundtail chub	Gila robusta	Cyprinidae	Yes	
Sand shiner	Notropis stramineus	Cyprinidae	Yes	
Sauger	Sander canadense	Percidae	Yes	
Shorthead redhorse	Moxostoma macrolepidotum	Catostomidae	Yes	
Shovelnose sturgeon	Scaphirhynchus platorynchus	Acipenseridae	Yes	
Speckled dace	Rhinichthys osculus	Cyprinidae	Yes	
Stonecat	Noturus flavus	Ictaluridae	Yes	
Sturgeon chub	Macrhybopsis gelida	Cyprinidae	Yes	
Suckermouth minnow	Phenacobius mirabilis	Cyprinidae	Yes	
Utah chub	Gila atrarias	Cyprinidae	Yes	
Utah sucker	Catostomus ardens	Catostomidae	Yes	
Western silvery minnow	Hybognathus argyritis	Cyprinidae	Yes	
White sucker	Catostomus commersoni	Catostomidae	Yes	
Black crappie	Pomoxis nigromaculatus	Centrarchidae	No	
Bluegill	Lepomis macrochirus	Centrarchidae	No	
Common carp	Cyprinus carpio	Cyprinidae	No	
Emerald shiner	Notropis atherinoides	Cyprinidae	No	
Freshwater drum	Aplodinotus grunniens	Sciaenidae	No	
Gizzard shad	Dorosoma cepedianum	Clupeidae	No	
Golden shiner	Notemigonus crysoleucas	Cyprinidae	No	
Goldfish	Carassius auratus	Cyprinidae	No	
Grass carp	Ctenopharyngodon idella	Cyprinidae	No	
Green sunfish	Lepomis cyanellus	Centrarchidae	No	
Green swordtail	Xiphophorus helleri	Poeciliidae	No	
Guppy	Poecilia reticulata	Poeciliidae	No	
Largemouth bass	Micropterus salmoides	Centrarchidae	No	
Northern pike	Esox lucius	Esocidae	No	
Ohrid trout	Salmo letnica	Salmonidae	No	
Pumpkinseed	Lepomis gibbosus	Centrarchidae	No	
Rock bass	Ambloplites rupestris	Centrarchidae	No	
Smallmouth bass	Micropterus dolomieu	Centrarchidae	No	
Spottail shiner	Notropis hudsonius	Cyprinidae	No	
Walleye	Sander vitreum	Percidae	No	
Western mosquitofish	Gambusia affinis	Poeciliidae	No	
White crappie	Pomoxis annularis	Centrarchidae	No	
Yellow perch	Perca flavescens	Percidae	No	
Arctic char	Salvelinus alpinus	Salmonidae	No	
