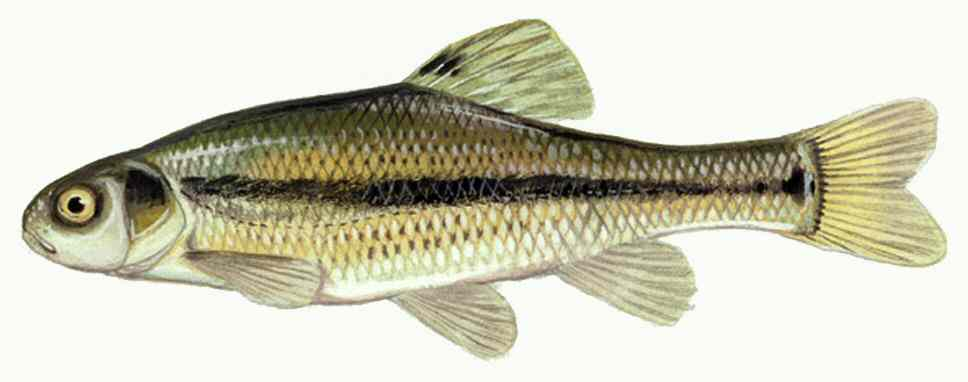
- Fathead minnow

Scientific classification
- Kingdom: Animalia
- Phylum: Chordata
- Class: Actinopterygii
- Division: Teleostei
- Order: Cypriniformes
- Superfamily: Cyprinoidea

Included species
- See text

= Minnow =

Common name for a number of species of small freshwater fish

Minnow is the common name for a number of species of small freshwater fish, belonging to several genera of the family Cyprinidae and in particular the subfamily Leuciscinae. They are also known in Ireland as pinkeens.

While the common name can refer to a range of taxa, smaller fish in the subfamily Leusciscinae are considered by anglers to be "true" minnows.

== Types of minnow ==
Bluntnose minnow (Pimephales notatus): The bluntnose minnow is a primary bait fish for Northern America, and has a very high tolerance for variable water qualities, which helps its distribution throughout many regions. The snout of the bluntnose minnow overhangs the mouth, giving it the bluntnose. There is a dark lateral line which stretches from the opercle to the base of the tail, where a large black spot is located. The average size of the adult is approximately 5 cm (2.0 in).

Common shiner (Notropis cornutus): These fish are one of the most common type of bait fish and are almost exclusively stream dwellers. The common shiner can be identified by the nine rays on its anal fin and terminal mouth. This minnow is typically bluish silver on the sides and greenish blue on the back, save for breeding season in which case the male gains a rose colored tail and anal fin. The shiner grows about 5–10 cm (2.0–3.9 in) within one year and reach a size of 13 cm (5.1 in) at adulthood. Notropis potteri is known as the chub shiner.

Common emerald shiner (Notropis atherinoides atherinoides): Common emerald shiners are most abundant in the Great Lakes of North America, primarily Lake Erie. The name of the emerald shiner comes from the greenish emerald band that expands from the back of the gill cover to the tail. This type of minnow has a short, rounded snout, the only difference between the common emerald shiner and the silver shiner is that the silver shiner has a longer snout and a larger eye. These fish grow to an average length of about 6 cm. This is one of the most common bait fish used in the Lake Erie region of Ohio and many fishermen hold it over all other bait.

- Cheat minnow, a species in the genus Pararhinichthys
- Cutlips minnow, a species in the genus Exoglossum
- Desert minnows, fishes in the genus Dionda
- Eurasian minnows, fishes in the genus Phoxinus
- Fathead minnow (rosy-red minnow), a species in the genus Pimephales
- Loach minnow, a species of the genus Rhinichthys
- Balkan minnows, of the genus Pelasgus
- Ozark minnow, a species in the shiner genus Notropis
- Pikeminnows, fishes in the genus Ptychocheilus
- Pugnose minnow, a species in the genus Opsopoeodus
- Anatolian minnows, of the genus Ladigesocypris
- Silverjaw minnow/Longjaw minnow, species in the genus Ericymba
- Silvery minnows, fishes in the genus Hybognathus
- Suckermouth minnows, fishes in the genus Phenacobius
- White Cloud Mountain minnow/Vietnamese cardinal minnow, species in the genus Tanichthys

Other fish specifically called minnows include

- in the Southern Hemisphere, some fish in the family Galaxiidae, in particular those of genus Galaxias
- in Southeast Asia, the danionins, including Razorbelly minnows
- the Drakensberg minnow (Labeobarbus aspius) from the Congo Democratic Republic
- the Maluti minnow (Pseudobarbus quathlambae) from Lesotho
- the Falklands minnow from the Falkland Islands, a vernacular name for the Common galaxias
- the pike topminnow (Belonesox belizanus) are confused for the northern pike, (Esox lucius), also called "minnow" for the little size.
- the minnows of the deep (Cyclothone sp.), small bioluminescent bristlemouth fish approximately 8 centimetres (3 in) long

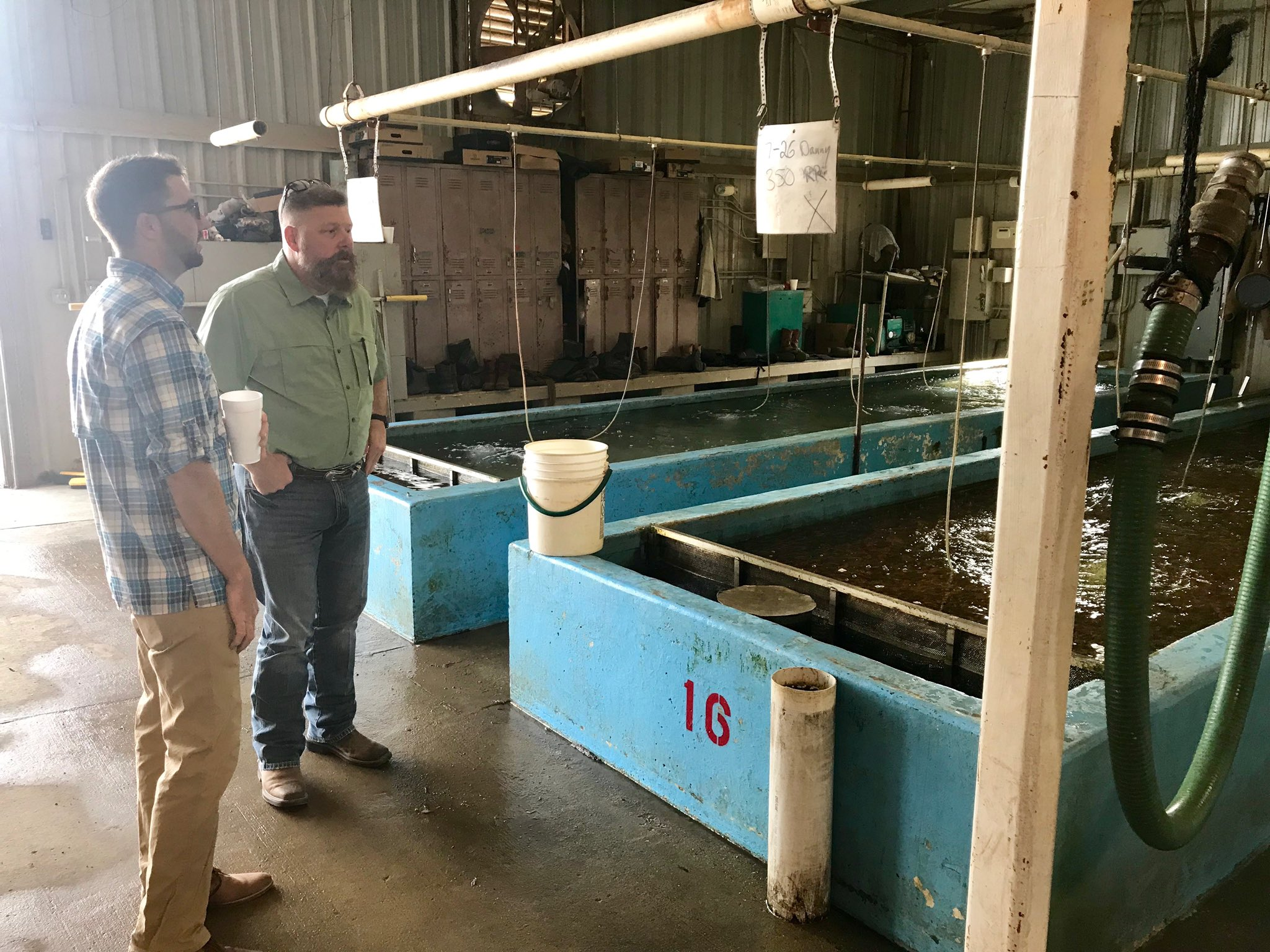
Rick Crawford visiting Anderson Farms, the world's largest minnow farm, in Lonoke, Arkansas

== As food ==
While primarily used for bait, minnows can also be eaten directly by humans. Some Native American cultures have used minnows as food. If minnows are small enough, they can be eaten whole.

== Threats and conservation issues ==
Generally, minnows breed with the slightest rainfall and within a wide temperature range. Contrary to the long-standing presumptions, climate change poses 'negligible' threat to minnows' reproduction. Minnows are also flexible in attaining pre-spawning fitness, which makes them avoid 'skipped spawning' decisions while facing climatic variabilities.

== See also ==
- Mud minnow (disambiguation)
- Cape Fear shiner
- Epalzeorhynchos, occasionally named sharkminnows
