= Mud minnow =

Mud minnow may refer to:

- Galaxiella munda, known as Western mud minnow
- Lepidogalaxias salamandroides, common name Shannon mudminnow
- species of fish of the family Umbridae
  - Central mudminnow
  - Eastern mudminnow
  - European mudminnow
- Mummichog (Fundulus heteroclitus), or mud minnows, a small killifish
