= Drakensberg minnow =

Drakensberg minnow is a common name for several fishes and may refer to:

- Labeobarbus aspius, endemic to the Congo Democratic Republic
- Pseudobarbus quathlambae, endemic to Lesotho
