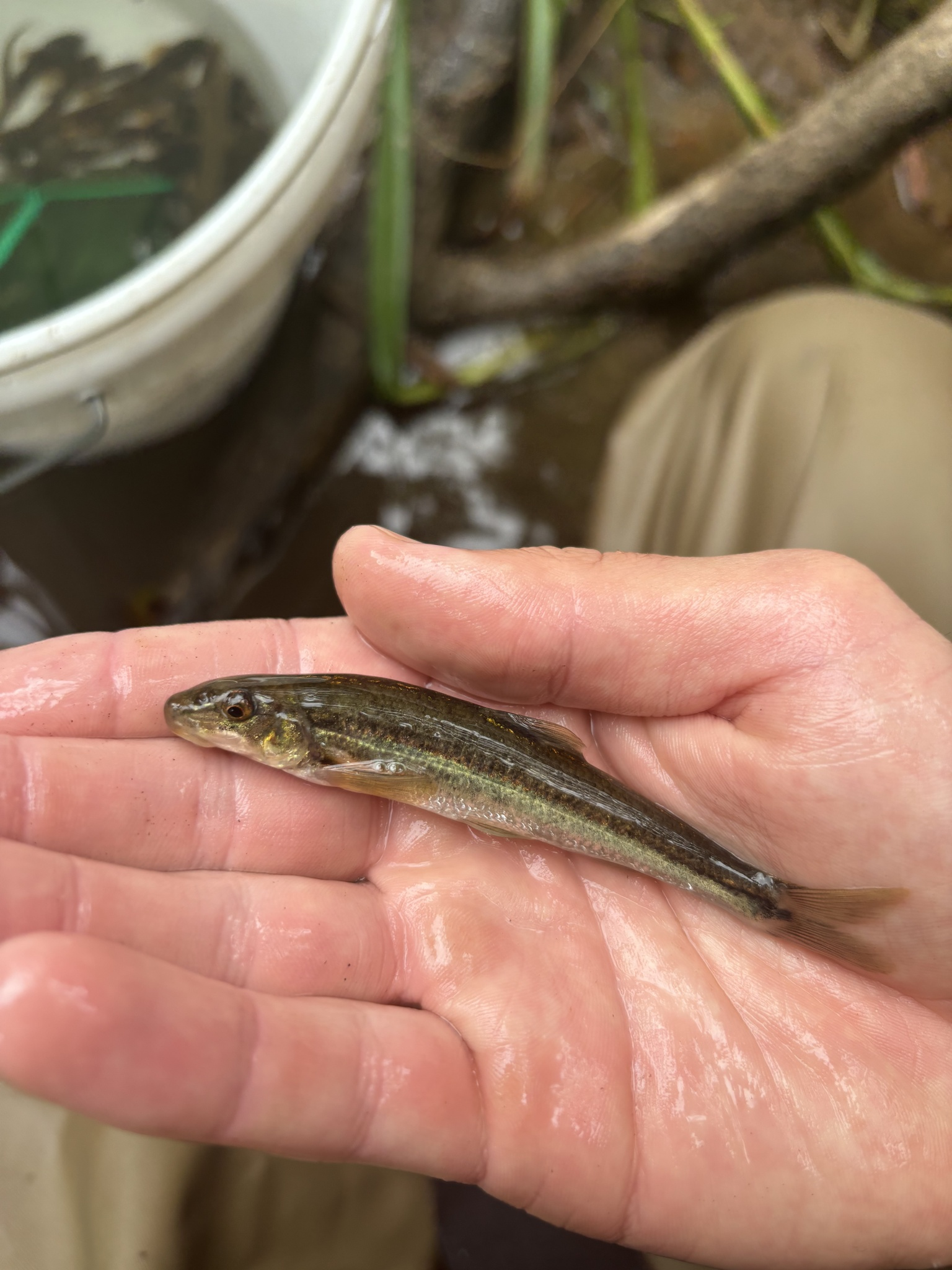

Conservation status
- Least Concern (IUCN 3.1)

Scientific classification
- Kingdom: Animalia
- Phylum: Chordata
- Class: Actinopterygii
- Order: Cypriniformes
- Family: Leuciscidae
- Subfamily: Pogonichthyinae
- Genus: Phenacobius
- Species: P. crassilabrum

Binomial name
- Phenacobius crassilabrum W. L. Minckley & Craddock, 1962

= Fatlips minnow =

Species of fish

The fatlips minnow (Phenacobius crassilabrum) is a species of suckermouth minnow that was first described in the upper Tennessee River system. No fewer than 20 specimens were used for description, and the epithet crassilabrum (from the Latin crassus meaning thick or fat and labrum, or lip) was assigned to the species, separating it from Phenacobius catostomus, with which it had previously been identified. The first holotype specimen collected in 1947 was an adult female 8 millimetres (0.31 in) in length from the River.

== Geographic distribution ==
The distribution of the fatlips minnow is restricted to North America, where it occurs in the upper Tennessee River drainage in western Virginia, western North Carolina, eastern Tennessee and northeastern Georgia. Its habitat is gravel and riffles in small to medium creeks. The fatlips minnow is believed to have arisen from a P. catostomus -like stock population that re-invaded the upper Tennessee River via reciprocal stream piracy. A genetic sister relationship between P. crassilabrum and P. uranops has been consistently resolved. The ranges of P. crassilabrum and P. uranops complement one another in the Tennessee River system, with the former opting for higher elevations. In Virginia, P. crassilabrum occupies the lower free-flowing portion of the South Fork of Holston River and Laurel Creek.

There are documented instances of nonindigenous (out-of-range) occurrences of Phenacobius species; these are believed to be a result of fishermen releasing their unused baitfish into local bodies of water. The current population of P. crassilabrum is presumed to be about 10,000 individuals.

== Ecology ==
P. crassilabrum is known to favor gravel riffles in the warm clear waters of small to medium-sized streams and rivers. Species of the genus Phenacobius remain near the bottom of streams, rooting in the ground for their prey of detritus and aquatic insects such as mayfly and caddisfly larvae.

== Life history ==
Breeding activity has not been observed in P. crassilabrum. Spawning for other Phenacobius species occurs in the spring and summer (April to August). Spawning events take place in the preferred gravelly riffles, allowing the released eggs to seek out nooks and crannies within the substrate. The maximum life span described in the genus is three years.

== Management ==
P. crassilabrum, while existing in small numbers in comparison to other species sharing its ecosystem, is considered to be of the least concern in terms of conservation status (IUCN) and its population is considered stable. An additional factor to consider is the movement of non-native fish into the range of P. crassilabrum, threatening habitat and resource availability.
