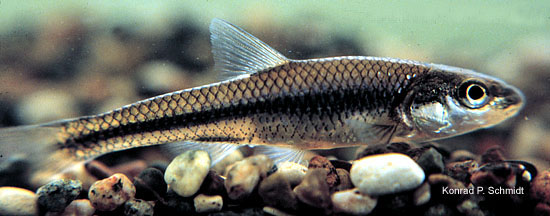

Conservation status
- Least Concern (IUCN 3.1)

Scientific classification
- Kingdom: Animalia
- Phylum: Chordata
- Class: Actinopterygii
- Order: Cypriniformes
- Family: Leuciscidae
- Subfamily: Pogonichthyinae
- Genus: Ericymba
- Species: E. dorsalis

Binomial name
- Ericymba dorsalis (Agassiz, 1854)

Synonyms
- Hybopsis dorsalis Agassiz, 1854; Notropis dorsalis Agassiz, 1854; Photogenis piptolepis Cope, 1871; Notropis gilberti Jordan & Meek, 1885; Notropis keimi Fowler, 1909; Notropis horatii Cockerell, 1911

= Bigmouth shiner =

Species of fish

The bigmouth shiner (Ericymba dorsalis), is one of the 324 fish species found in Tennessee. It is a common minnow species found in the midwest region, but found as far as the east coast. There has been little information researched about this minnow outside of the general body plan and habitat. They are often found along with common shiner in streams.

== Description ==
The bigmouth shiner is a small minnow that reaches a size of about 3 inches. It is grayish-yellow on back with silver sides and belly with a dark stripe down the middle of their side. The bigmouth shiner has a subterminal mouth, meaning the upper jaw overhangs the wide lower jaw, a characteristic trait of the species. As is characteristic of minnows, Notropis dorsalis has one dorsal fin with under ten soft fin rays.

== Distribution and habitat ==
The bigmouth shiner is endemic to North America. It can be commonly found in the Great Lakes, Hudson Bay, and Mississippi River basins. It is also found in the Platte River system, Iowa, Illinois, and Arkansas. It can also be found as far east as the western regions of New York, and Pennsylvania, and northern parts of West Virginia. Three sometimes recognized subspecies Notropis dorsalis dorsalis, N. d. piptolepis, and N. d. keimi.

The bigmouth shiner prefers to live in shallow, swift moving streams. They can also be found in shallow pools of headwaters as well as small to medium rivers with sandy bottoms.

== Diet ==
Bigmouth shiners like to eat small aquatic invertebrates and terrestrial invertebrates that fall into the water. They have also been found to eat algae and other small vegetation at the bottom of the stream.

== Reproduction ==
Little is known about the reproductive habits of this species. It is known, however, that they spawn between May–August and that they spawn upstream allowing their eggs to flow downstream.

== Population and competition ==
Bigmouth shiners have been found to thrive in environments with increased channeling in streams, making human interaction beneficial at times. In Ohio the bigmouth shiner competes for environment with the invasive silverjaw minnow resulting in some reduced populations. Efforts to reduce pollution and erosion of banks can be taken to ensure the survival of the species.

In Missouri bigmouth shiner reach a length of about 0.8 to 1.6 inches by the end of its first summer of life and probably reaches maturity during its second summer.
