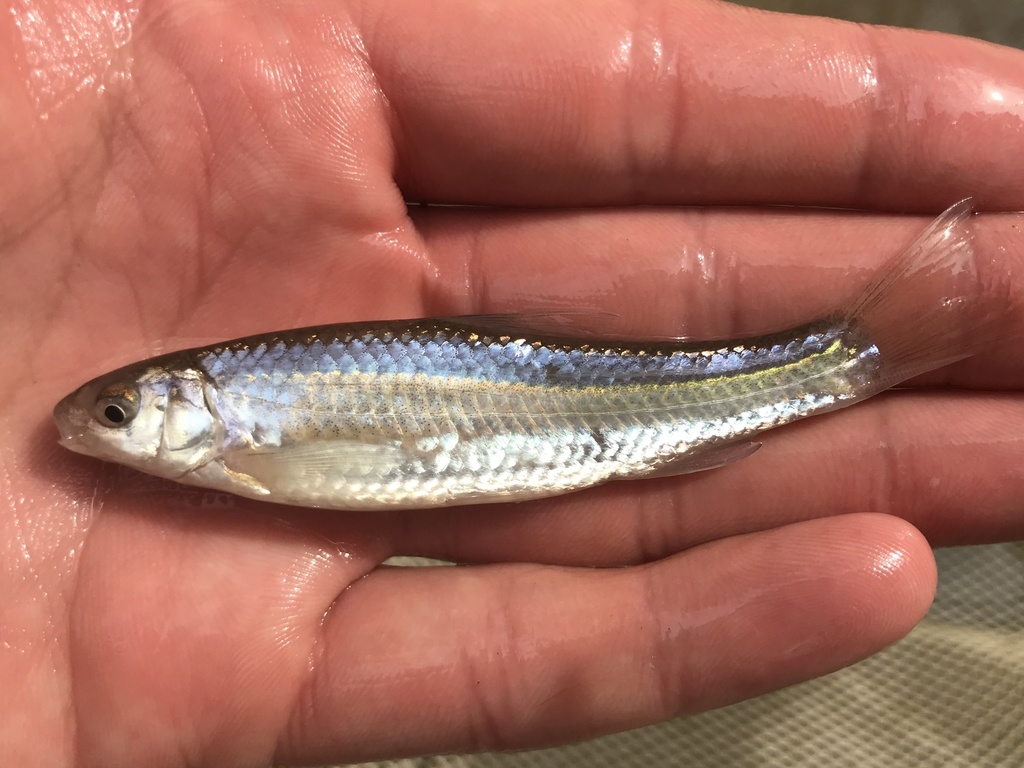

Conservation status
- Least Concern (IUCN 3.1)

- Secure (NatureServe)

Scientific classification
- Kingdom: Animalia
- Phylum: Chordata
- Class: Actinopterygii
- Order: Cypriniformes
- Family: Leuciscidae
- Subfamily: Pogonichthyinae
- Genus: Hybognathus
- Species: H. nuchalis

Binomial name
- Hybognathus nuchalis Agassiz, 1855

Synonyms
- Tirodon amnigenus Hay, 1882

= Mississippi silvery minnow =

Species of fish

The Mississippi silvery minnow (Hybognathus nuchalis) is a species of freshwater ray-finned fish belonging to the family Leuciscidae, the shiners, daces and minnows. It is one of the 324 fish species found in Tennessee. Relative to other minnows, the Mississippi Silvery Minnow is a large minnow. These minnows require a body of water with little to no current. The most documentation of these minnows is from the Little and Great Miami river along with the Ohio river and tributes off these rivers. In terms of conservation, the population in Ohio is at an all-time low, but overall there is little conservation concern about this specific minnow. In general there has been little research done on the Mississippi silvery minnow.

== Distribution ==
The Mississippi silvery minnow is native to North America. These fish have been documented to live in lowland areas of the Mississippi River basin. This stretches from Minnesota down to Ohio. There is also documentation of these minnows in the Mississippi River all the way to the Gulf of Mexico. It is very common to find these fish in smaller streams right before the stream connects to a larger stream/river. Other states that have records of the Mississippi silvery minnow include Illinois, Alabama, Texas, Pennsylvania and New Mexico.

== Physical description ==
The Mississippi silvery minnow gets its name in part due to its appearance. The majority of this fish is covered in silver scales that are very reflective with a large dark stripe down the center of their back. The average minnow length is between 12 and 13 centimetres (4.7 and 5.1 in). The Mississippi silvery minnow has a lateral line on each side of its body. These minnows have a pair of pectoral fins, along with a pair of small pelvic fins. The Mississippi silvery minnow, like many other minnows, have an anal fin, dorsal fin, and a powerful caudal fin. The dorsal fin is very centered between the head and the caudal fin. All fins on the fish have no markings and are transparent. The Mississippi silvery minnow closely resembles the Cypress minnow.

== Habitat and diet ==
The Mississippi silvery minnow mainly lives in freshwater river basins and shallow ponds/streams. These shallow streams are usually low gradient streams. These fish are categorized as benthopelagic feeders. The Mississippi silvery minnow feeds in large schools of other silvery minnows and feed mainly on benthos, which is the flora and fauna found on the bottom or in the sediment, and also small swimming organisms.

== Reproduction ==
The female Mississippi silvery minnow spreads her eggs along the bottom in soft mud. The offspring will spawn in early summer, dates vary depending on location. For example, in Wisconsin they spawn in late April. Eggs are on average 0.8mm in diameter. Mississippi silvery minnows do not provide any sort of parental care from either the male or female. These minnows have also never been documented defending any sort of territory.

== Other notes ==
There is little to no information/research done on the Mississippi silvery minnow. This is most likely due to how many different types of minnows populate the United States. If there's any question to what the Mississippi silvery minnow looks like Google Images will provide adequate photos; Due to copyright issues, no pictures were able to be inserted onto this page.
