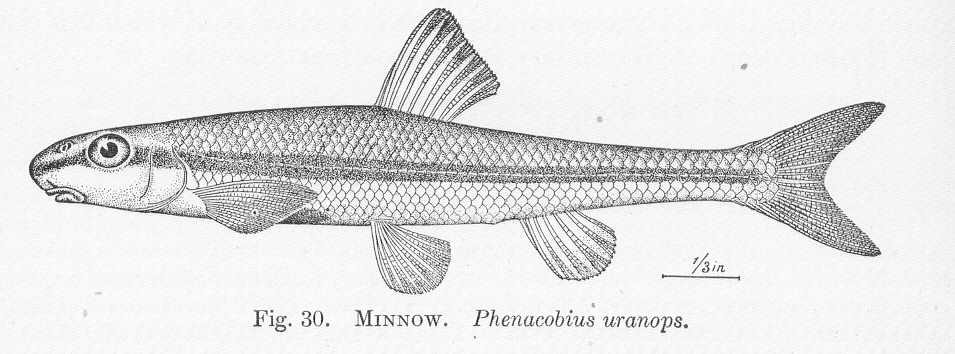

Conservation status
- Least Concern (IUCN 3.1)

Scientific classification
- Kingdom: Animalia
- Phylum: Chordata
- Class: Actinopterygii
- Order: Cypriniformes
- Family: Leuciscidae
- Subfamily: Pogonichthyinae
- Genus: Phenacobius
- Species: P. uranops

Binomial name
- Phenacobius uranops Cope, 1867

= Stargazing minnow =

Species of fish

The stargazing minnow (Phenacobius uranops) is a species of freshwater ray-finned fish beloinging to the family Leuciscidae, the shiners, daces and minnows. It is distributed in the Green, Cumberland and Tennessee River drainages in Kentucky, Virginia, Tennessee, Georgia and Alabama.

This fish is generally about 8 cm long, and grows to 12 cm at most. It is common and abundant and not considered to be threatened.
