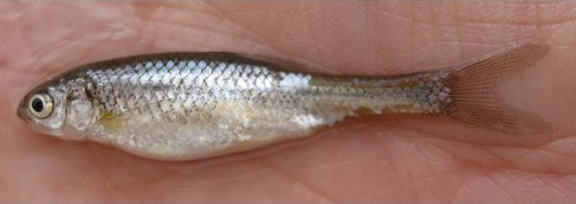

Conservation status
- Endangered (IUCN 3.1)

- Critically Imperiled (NatureServe)

Scientific classification
- Kingdom: Animalia
- Phylum: Chordata
- Class: Actinopterygii
- Order: Cypriniformes
- Family: Leuciscidae
- Subfamily: Pogonichthyinae
- Genus: Hybognathus
- Species: H. amarus

Binomial name
- Hybognathus amarus (Girard, 1856)

Synonyms
- Algoma amara Girard, 1856; Algoma fluviatilis Girard, 1856

= Rio Grande silvery minnow =

Species of fish

The Rio Grande silvery minnow (Hybognathus amarus) or Rio Grande minnow, is a species of freshwater ray-finned fish belonging to the family Leuciscidae, the shiners, daces, and minnows. This is a small, herbivorous, North American fish, one of the seven North American members of the genus Hybognathus.

The Rio Grande silvery minnow is one of the most endangered fish in North America, according to the U. S. Fish and Wildlife Service (USFWS). It was classified as endangered in the U.S. in 1994 and now is found in less than 5% of its natural habitat in the Rio Grande. Historically, the minnow was found from Española, New Mexico, to the Gulf of Mexico in Texas. Now, it can only be seen between Cochiti Dam and Elephant Butte Reservoir. It can also be found in a small pond in North Carolina.

== Description ==
It is a stout, silvery minnow with moderately small eyes and a small mouth. Adults may reach 3.5 in (89 mm) in total length.

== Diet and behavior ==
Rio Grande silvery minnows are herbivores whose diet is believed to consist of river plants and benthic macroinvertebrates, though little research has been conducted into their diet due to the difficulty of getting into their stomachs. They play a role in keeping water clean by eating algae.

Silvery minnows tend to skim the bottom of rivers and streams and are prolific spawners. They serve as food source for other animals.

== Reproduction ==
The Rio Grande silvery minnow's eggs hatch in about 24 hours into larvae that can swim in just 3 to 4 days. A species so programmed for survival, unsurprisingly, once dominated a biological niche that spanned roughly 3,000 meandering miles (4,825 km) in New Mexico and Texas.

== Classification under the Endangered Species Act ==
The Rio Grande silvery minnow was first listed on July 20, 1994. It is currently designated as endangered in its entire range. The population decline of the Rio Grande silvery minnow has been almost directly proportional to recent alterations to the Rio Grande over the past century. Multiple diversions for municipal and agricultural uses have occurred, including alteration of the natural hydrograph (no spring runoff to cue spawning), habitat degradation from river narrowing and canalization, and construction of diversion dams that prevent migration. Even with the minnow's listing in 1994, its population has continued to drop at a great rate. Minnow numbers are now considerably below their 1994 population, and the Rio Grande silvery minnow is found in only 5% of its former habitat.

Alterations of the Rio Grande include not only the modification of the flow of water by dams and channels, but also the unintentional pollution of the water, which can originate from many factors, the major ones being effluents by the military and industrial companies and wastewater from nearby cities and towns.

== Restoration efforts ==
In 2000, the USFWS initiated a silvery minnow egg salvage pilot project. Biologists from the service, Bureau of Reclamation, and University of New Mexico collect minnow eggs and reproductively ready adult minnows near Elephant Butte, where these efforts do not disturb upstream populations. Captured adult minnows are induced to spawn, either at the Albuquerque Biological Park or the USFWS's New Mexico Fishery Resources Office. Biologists then either return the resulting fry to the Rio Grande or hold them for captive propagation.

=== The silvery minnow refugium ===
as taken from the Van H. Gilbert Architect PC official page:

Van H. Gilbert Architect PC, in association with FishPro, developed conceptual and final design for a naturalized refugium for propagation of the endangered Rio Grande silvery minnow at the City of Albuquerque's Biological Park. The facility consists of a 50,000-gallon outdoor refugium and a 3,500 square-foot building with tiers of aquarium tanks that contain tens of thousands of baby minnows, each no more than a sixth of an inch long. The donut-shaped outdoor pond varies in depth from about one inch to two feet. Pumps control the current to mimic the natural flows of the Rio Grande. The bottom surface is a mixture of sand, gravel, and silt. The breeding goal of the $1.7 million facility was to produce 50,000 minnows this year - with 25,000 minnows to be returned to the river and 25,000 to be retained for future captive spawning. The actual numbers are much higher. This project is the recipient of the Association of Conservation Engineers 2003 Award of Excellence (top honor/national design award) and the Best Civil/Infrastructure New Mexico Project for the Best of 2003 Awards from Southwest Contractor magazine.

=== Legal action ===
- Defenders of Wildlife, Forest Guardians, and others filed suit in 1999 against BREC and ACOE for their lack of compliance under the ESA in their management of the river.
- In 2002, Judge Parker affirmed a June 2001 biological opinion from USFWS on how to avoid and mitigate impacts to the silvery minnow, but also concluded that BREC has the ability to use Rio Grande waters for the survival of the silvery minnow.
- In 2003, the Tenth Circuit upheld BREC's ability to deliver water to the river for endangered species.
- After a series of rulings and appeals in 2010, the environmental groups' complaint was dismissed in Rio Grande Silvery Minnow v. Bureau of Reclamation, although a number of agreements had been made by then to try to improve the silvery minnow's remaining habitat.
