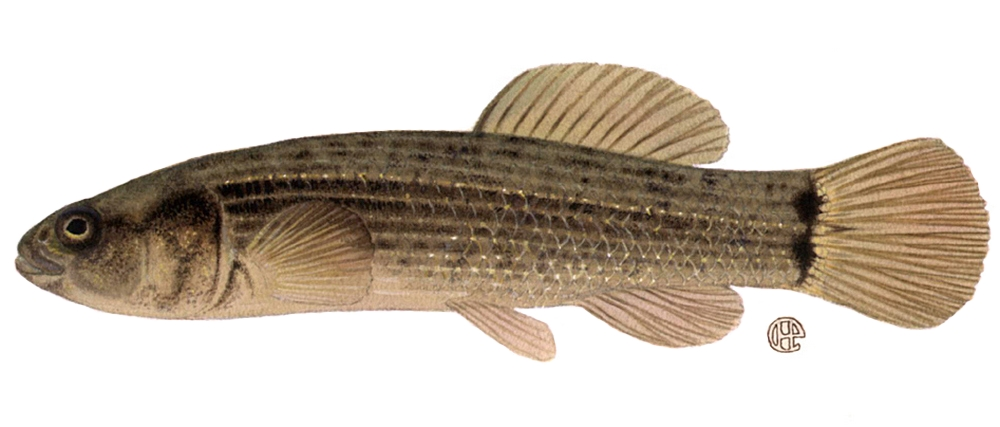

Conservation status
- Least Concern (IUCN 3.1)

Scientific classification
- Kingdom: Animalia
- Phylum: Chordata
- Class: Actinopterygii
- Order: Salmoniformes
- Family: Umbridae
- Genus: Umbra
- Species: U. pygmaea

Binomial name
- Umbra pygmaea (DeKay, 1842)

= Eastern mudminnow =

Species of fish

The eastern mudminnow (Umbra pygmaea) is a species of freshwater fish belonging to the family Umbridae. It is native to eastern North America, but has been introduced to Europe. It feeds primarily on insect larvae and other small aquatic invertebrates.

== Description ==
It is an elongated, stout-bodied fish, brown or yellow-green in color, with about 10 or more dark, narrow, lateral stripes separated by pale spaces, although there is no lateral line on the fish. The pelvic fin lies somewhat farther back on the body, such that it rests below the dorsal fin. The body is elongated, and the maximum size of the fish is 15 cm (5.9 in).

== Distribution and habitat ==
The native range of the eastern mudminnow is from New York to Florida, and found as west as Georgia. It has also been introduced to Europe, where it can be found in France, Belgium, Germany, the Netherlands, Denmark, and Poland.

It is generally found in still or slow-moving waters, often in dense vegetation, often over heavily vegetated streams, swamps, and ponds.

The eastern mudminnow has shown great adaptability to poor habitats with low pH, temperature, and presence of oxygen. At least one incident has been documented where an eastern mudminnow has survived an entire night out of water. The fish can be found in waters with a pH ranging from 3.5 to 8.1 in natural environments. The optimal pH for growth is 4.5, which is often detrimental or even fatal for most fish.

== Diet ==
The eastern mudminnow are bottom-feeders and feed on insect larvae, worms, molluscs, and crustaceans.

== Behavior ==
The eastern mudminnows are known to leap from the water while feeding.

=== Reproduction ===
Eastern mudminnows have been known to exhibit more complex reproductive behaviors. Males participate in courtship and the fish build nests. Nests can be found in cavities of algae, under loose rocks, and in depressions in the sand. Females guard nests, and males may as well.

During courtship, males will quiver their bodies and show their fins.

== Conservation ==
=== North America ===
In North America, the eastern mudminnow is usually viewed upon with little concern.

=== Europe ===
The eastern mudminnow is viewed as a potentially invasive species in much of Europe. The spread of the fish to six European countries in the 20th century is mostly attribute to popularity in the aquaculture and aquarium trades. The presence of eastern mudminnows in Europe can undermine the conservation efforts of vulnerable species such as the european mudminnow. The spread of the eastern mudminnow in these parts of Europe seems to be slow and primarily human mediated (due to usage as live bait or for aquariums).
