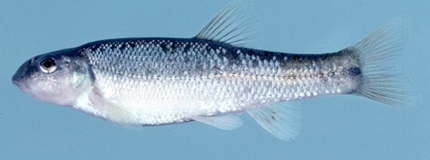

Conservation status
- Least Concern (IUCN 3.1)

Scientific classification
- Kingdom: Animalia
- Phylum: Chordata
- Class: Actinopterygii
- Order: Cypriniformes
- Family: Leuciscidae
- Subfamily: Pogonichthyinae
- Genus: Exoglossum
- Species: E. laurae

Binomial name
- Exoglossum laurae (Hubbs, 1931)

Synonyms
- Parexoglossum laurae Hubbs, 1931; Parexoglossum hubbsi Trautman, 1931

= Exoglossum laurae =

Species of fish

Exoglossum laurae, tonguetied minnow, is a species of freshwater ray-finned fish belonging to the family Leuciscidae, the shiners, daces and minnows. This fish is found in North America.

== Description ==
The color of the fish ranges from dark gray to brown-black, with purple specks located throughout its body and a white belly. The fish ranges from three to five inches long. The minnow is named for its mouth. The lower mouth is only partially covered with its lips, leaving part of the minnow's jaw exposed. The mouth is horizontal and small.

The minnow has eight dorsal fin-rays, seven anal fin-rays, eight pelvic fin-rays and thirteen to seventeen pectoral fin-rays.

== Habitat ==
The minnow lives throughout Ontario and the Northeastern United States. In the state of Ohio, the minnow is only confirmed to inhabit the Great Miami and Little Miami rivers. The Ohio population of Exoglossum laurae, which is separated from more Eastern populations by several hundred miles, is considered a subspecies.

The minnow is unable to live in murky waters and requires a clean rock river bottom. It also requires a forested river bank. The minnow needs somewhat cool water temperatures to survive.

== Behavior ==
=== Hunting ===
The minnow has been categorized as an active hunter of prey, meaning that it will actively leave the safety of natural shelter to hunt prey. The hunting may occur alone or in groups. The primary prey of the minnow is aquatic invertebrates.

=== Reproduction ===
The minnow reproduces around the month of May. Male minnows construct a nest of pebbles, which are then used to protect spawned eggs. These nests are actively defended by males. Mating likely occurs over an extended period of time as minnow spawn in various stages of development have been observed in the nests.

== Conservation status ==
Exoglossum laurae has a large population size and is considered common in its range. However, the minnow has experienced habitat loss due to water pollution and the channelization of rivers. The total population of the minnow has declined as a result of these threats. However, it is not deemed to be at risk due to its overall stable population trends and large population size.
