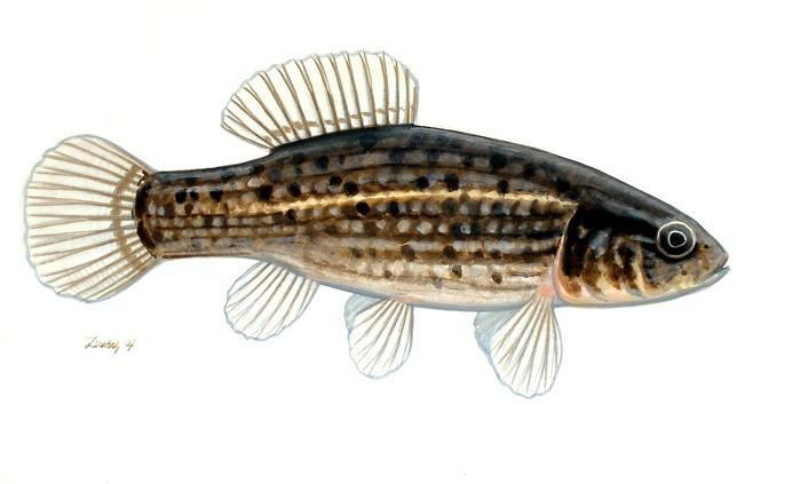
- European mudminnow, Umbra krameri

Scientific classification
- Kingdom: Animalia
- Phylum: Chordata
- Class: Actinopterygii
- Division: Teleostei
- Order: Salmoniformes
- Family: Umbridae
- Genus: Umbra; W. H. Kramer, 1777

Type species
- Umbra krameri Walbaum, 1792

= Umbra (fish) =

Umbra Temporal range: Late Eocene to present

Genus of fishes

Umbra is a genus of mudminnows native to Europe and North America. It is the only extant member of the family Umbridae.

Phylogenetic evidence suggests the North American and European clades split between the Late Cretaceous or early Paleogene, making this a rather ancient group.

== Species ==
The currently recognized species in this genus are:

- Umbra krameri Walbaum, 1792 (European mudminnow)
- Umbra limi (Kirtland, 1840) (central mudminnow)
- Umbra pygmaea (DeKay, 1842) (eastern mudminnow)

The following fossil species are also known:

- †Umbra euronota Schwarzhans et al., 2024 - Middle Miocene of Ukraine [otolith]
- †Umbra irtyshensis Sytchevskaya, 1968
- †Umbra longidorsalis Böhme, 2004 - Early Miocene of the Czech Republic (Most Formation)
- †Umbra oderiensis Oberhlová, 1978 - Late Oligocene/Early Miocene of the Czech Republic
- †Umbra perpusilla (Agassiz, 1839) - Middle Miocene of Germany
- †Umbra praekrameri Weinfurter, 1950 - Late Miocene of Austria [otolith]
- †Umbra prochazkai Oberhlová, 1978 - Late Oligocene of the Czech Republic

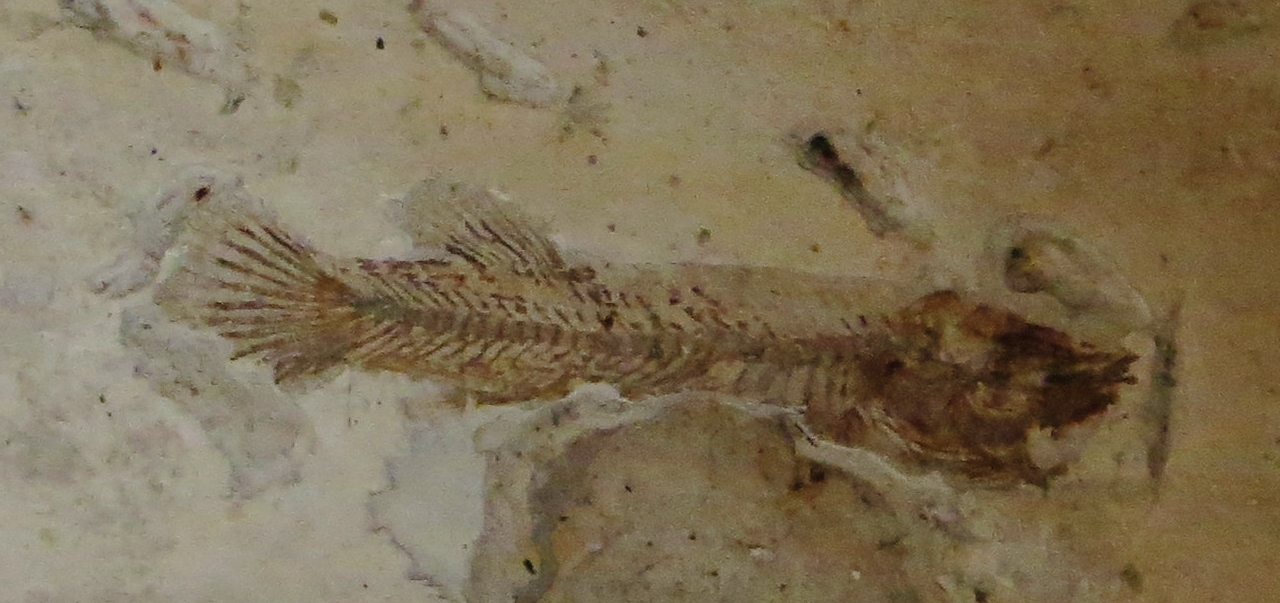
Fossil specimen of Umbra perpusilla

Indeterminate Umbra scales are known from the Late Eocene/Early Oligocene of the Czech Republic.
