= Nazas shiner =

Conservation status
- Least Concern (IUCN 3.1)

Scientific classification
- Kingdom: Animalia
- Phylum: Chordata
- Class: Actinopterygii
- Order: Cypriniformes
- Family: Leuciscidae
- Subfamily: Pogonichthyinae
- Genus: Hybognathus
- Species: H. nazas

Binomial name
- Hybognathus nazas (Meek, 1904)

Synonyms
- Notropis nazas Meek, 1904

Species of fish

The Nazas shiner (Hybognathus nazas) is a species of freshwater ray-finned fish belonging to the family Leuciscidae, the shiners. daces and minnows. It is endemic to Mexico and only known from endorheic Nazas-Aguanaval river basin.

Nazas shiner occurs in creeks, streams and large rivers on rocky to sandy substrates, rarely mud. It is captured locally for human consumption.

Type locality of Notropis nazas is Nazas River at Santiago Papasquiaro, Durango, Mexico
