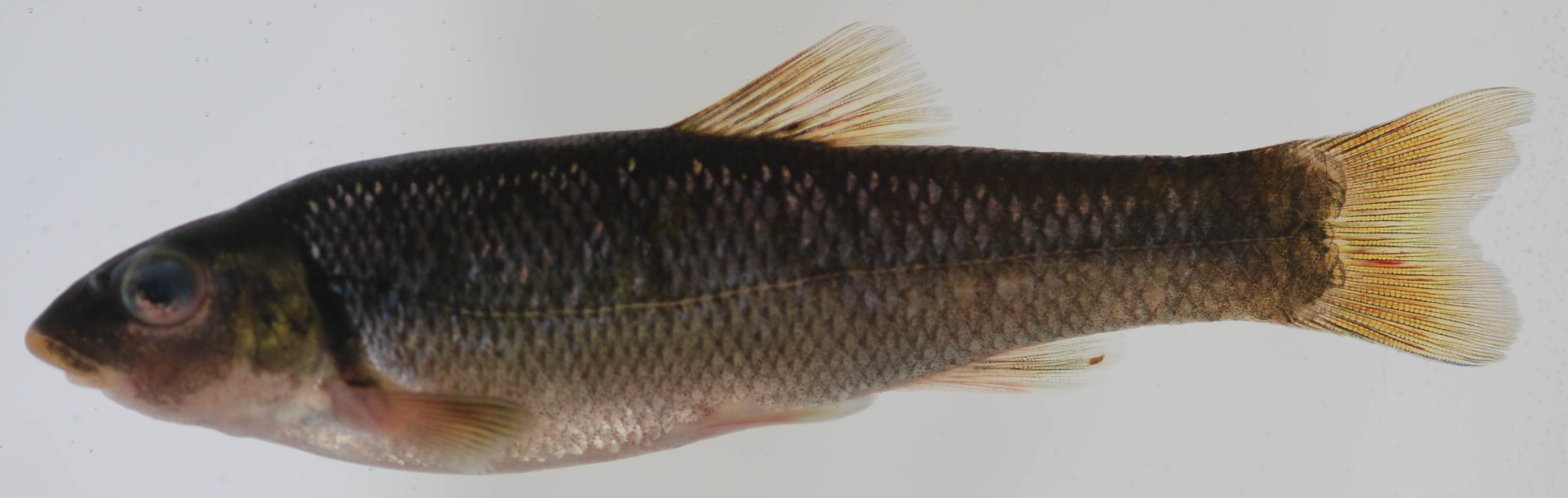

Conservation status
- Least Concern (IUCN 3.1)

Scientific classification
- Kingdom: Animalia
- Phylum: Chordata
- Class: Actinopterygii
- Division: Teleostei
- Order: Cypriniformes
- Family: Leuciscidae
- Subfamily: Pogonichthyinae
- Genus: Exoglossum
- Species: E. maxillingua

Binomial name
- Exoglossum maxillingua (Lesueur, 1817)

Synonyms
- Cyprinus maxillingua Lesueur, 1817; Exoglossum annulatum Rafinesque, 1818; Exoglossum nigrescens Rafinesque, 1818; Exoglossum vittatum Rafinesque, 1818; Exoglossum lesurianum Rafinesque, 1818

= Exoglossum maxillingua =

Species of fish

"Cutlips minnows" is also used for the genus Exoglossum as a whole.

Exoglossum maxillingua (cutlips minnow) is a species of freshwater ray-finned fish belonging to the family Leuciscidae, the shiners, daces and minnows. This is an olive-green medium-sized minnow (average 6 inches) of North America with a distinguishing lower jaw. Isolated from all other minnows by its three-lobed lower jaw with the middle lobe sticking out like a tongue. The range of this species is from the St. Lawrence and Lake Ontario south into Virginia. It is listed as "threatened" in the Canadian province of Ontario, but may never have been common there as this is the most northerly of its range. It is found in running streams and seems to prefer clear, stony pools but not rapids. The distinctive mouth of the cutlips lets it feed on minuscule shellfish which it scrapes from rocks. Although molluscs appear to be its primary food, it also eats insect larvae and diatoms. An interesting feeding behavior of this species is "eye-picking" when food is scarce or competition is high. The Cutlips will pluck out the eyes of conspecifics or other species as a supplement to its regular diet. A nest builder, the cutlips male constructs a nest of stone, some of which are up to 18 inches across. Spawning happens late in spring when the male attempts to crowd females over its nest. The cutlips is not a popular bait species due to its softened coloration but it takes a hook without much difficulty and is favored in some areas as a choice panfish.
