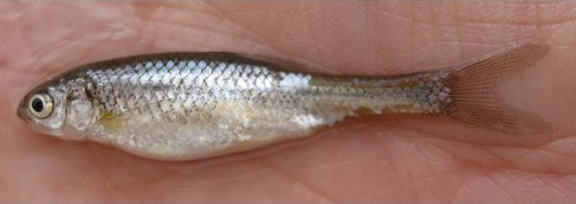
- Rio Grande silvery minnow (Hybognathus amarus)

Scientific classification
- Kingdom: Animalia
- Phylum: Chordata
- Class: Actinopterygii
- Order: Cypriniformes
- Family: Leuciscidae
- Subfamily: Pogonichthyinae
- Genus: Hybognathus; Agassiz, 1855

Type species
- Hybognathus nuchalis Agassiz, 1855

Species
- see text

Synonyms
- Algoma Girard, 1856; Tirodon Hay, 1882

= Hybognathus =

Genus of fishes

Hybognathus is a genus of freshwater ray-finned fishes belonging to the family Leuciscidae, the shiners, daces and minnows. Its members are collectively known as the silvery minnows. Hybognathus are pelagophils that are native to North America. The populations of such pelagophils, including species of Hybognathus, continue to decrease in their natural habitats.

== Species ==
Hybognathus includes the following valid species:

- Hybognathus amarus (Girard, 1856) (Rio Grande silvery minnow)
- Hybognathus argyritis Girard, 1856 (Western silvery minnow)
- Hybognathus hankinsoni C. L. Hubbs, 1929 (Brassy minnow)
- Hybognathus hayi D. S. Jordan, 1885 (Cypress minnow)
- Hybognathus nazas (Meek, 1904) (Nazas shiner)
- Hybognathus nuchalis Agassiz, 1855 (Mississippi silvery minnow)
- Hybognathus placitus Girard, 1856 (Plains minnow)
- Hybognathus regius Girard, 1856 (Eastern silvery minnow)
