= Kanawha minnow =

Conservation status
- Least Concern (IUCN 3.1)

Scientific classification
- Kingdom: Animalia
- Phylum: Chordata
- Class: Actinopterygii
- Order: Cypriniformes
- Family: Leuciscidae
- Subfamily: Pogonichthyinae
- Genus: Phenacobius
- Species: P. teretulus

Binomial name
- Phenacobius teretulus Cope, 1867

Species of fish

The Kanawha minnow (Phenacobius teretulus) s a species of freshwater ray-finned fish beloinging to the family Leuciscidae, the shiners, daces and minnows. It is found only in the New River (of upper Kanawha River) drainage in North Carolina, Virginia and West Virginia.
