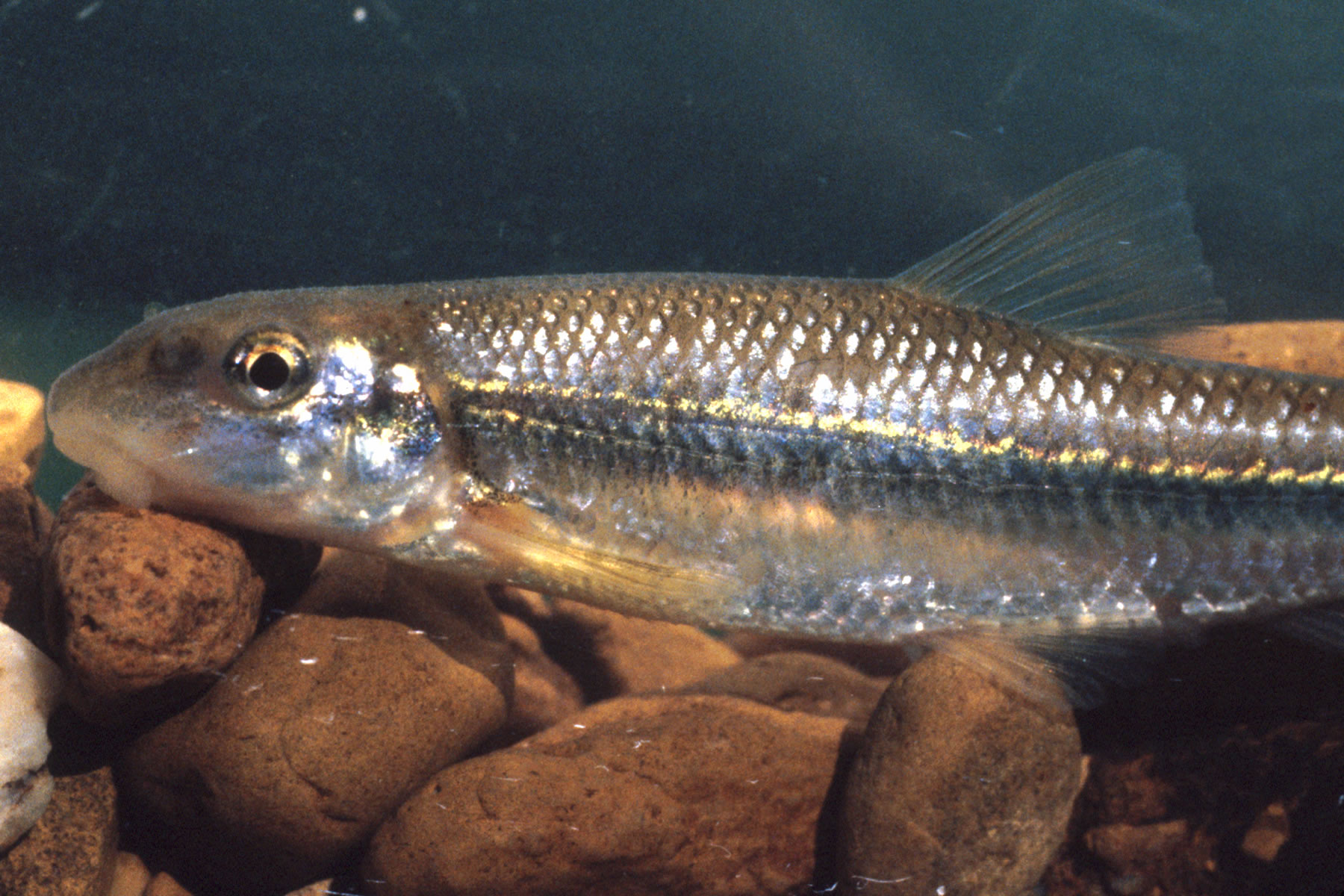
- Suckermouth minnow (Phenacobius mirabilis)

Scientific classification
- Kingdom: Animalia
- Phylum: Chordata
- Class: Actinopterygii
- Order: Cypriniformes
- Family: Leuciscidae
- Subfamily: Pogonichthyinae
- Genus: Phenacobius; Cope, 1867

Type species
- Phenacobius teretulus Cope, 1867

Synonyms
- Sarcidium Cope, 1871

= Phenacobius =

Genus of fishes

Phenacobius, the suckermouth minnows, is a genus of freshwater ray-finned fishes belonging to the family Leuciscidae, the shiners, daces and minnows. The fishes in this genus are endemic to the United States. Historically the suckermouth minnow was not found as far eastward as Ohio, now they seem to be a stable species living throughout the Midwest and parts of southern states such as Texas, New Mexico, and Alabama. Many forests and prairies were cleared out to make farmland, this caused for drainage streams and rivers to take form, moving the minnows eastward. Originally the suckermouth minnows probably never crossed the Mississippi River prior to the developed farm land. They have a lifespan of roughly 3–5 years, but is hard to measure due to predation, survival rate of about 50 percent. There are currently five described species. Etymologically, "phenacobius" means "deceptive life", possibly because these species eat insects despite an herbivorous appearance.

== Species ==
Phenacobius contains the following species:

- Phenacobius catostomus D. S. Jordan, 1877 (Riffle minnow)
- Phenacobius crassilabrum W. L. Minckley & Craddock, 1962 (Fatlips minnow)
- Phenacobius mirabilis (Girard, 1856) (Suckermouth minnow)
- Phenacobius teretulus Cope, 1867 (Kanawha minnow)
- Phenacobius uranops Cope, 1867 (Stargazing minnow)

== Description ==
Suckermouth minnows have a mouth that ends right below the tip of their snout (sub-terminal mouth), appearing like a small sucker and giving them the name suckermouth minnow. These minnows have five fins used for swimming, the dorsal fin which is located on the top of the fish, the anal fin located on the bottom of the fish towards the back by the tail, right in front of the anal fin is the pelvic fin, the pectoral fin is located on both sides of the fish, and finally the caudal fin or also known the tail. Suckermouth minnows have a long narrow black line that stretches down the side of the minnow ending at a dark spot near the base of the tail. Right above this black line is a narrow gold line running the same length as the black line and ending at the base of the tail, near the black spot. This fish uses countershading, on top of the minnow they are shaded a darker gray and on their belly they are shaded light cream to white. Around the gold and black lines on the sides of the minnow they are shaded a silvery or light brown.

== Length and weight ==
Like any typical member of the family Cyprinidae, they are usually 2–4 inches long and can reach 5 inches in length.

== Reproduction ==
Suckermouth minnows spawn in groups in late spring or early summer. Once the female lays her 200 to 500 eggs there seems to be no parental care. The water temperature during spawning periods is between 14 and 25 degrees Celsius. The mating system that these minnows use is polygynandrous (promiscuous), they mate with many females and males to reassure reproductive success. There are a few that have been said to pair mate but male testes are said to be larger in group spawning, suggesting group spawning or polygynandrous is the main mating system. Sexual size dimorphism varies among these two mating systems. Since most of the female suckermouths mate with many males and are iteroparous, she lays small batches of eggs throughout her spawning period, probably to allow greater survivorship among developing embryos.

== Food habitat ==
Suckermouth minnows are primarily carnivores and herbivores eating eggs, fish (piscivore), insects and algae.

== Fishing ==
Due to the suckermouth minnows being prey to green sunfish, yellow perch, and brown trout, they are commonly used for bait by fishermen.
