= Maluti redfin =

- Maluti redfin (Pseudobarbus quathlambae) in Lesotho

Conservation status
- Endangered (IUCN 3.1)

Scientific classification
- Kingdom: Animalia
- Phylum: Chordata
- Class: Actinopterygii
- Division: Teleostei
- Order: Cypriniformes
- Family: Cyprinidae
- Subfamily: Smiliogastrinae
- Genus: Pseudobarbus
- Species: P. quathlambae

Binomial name
- Pseudobarbus quathlambae (Barnard, 1938)

Synonyms
- Labeo quathlambae Barnard, 1938; Oreodaimon quathlambae (Barnard, 1938)

Species of fish

The Maluti redfin (Pseudobarbus quathlambae) is a ray-finned fish species in the family Cyprinidae. It is colloquially called the Maluti minnow, but it is not a true minnow.

It is Lesotho's only endemic freshwater fish, and threatened by the impact of invasive species, such as Smallmouth yellowfish.
