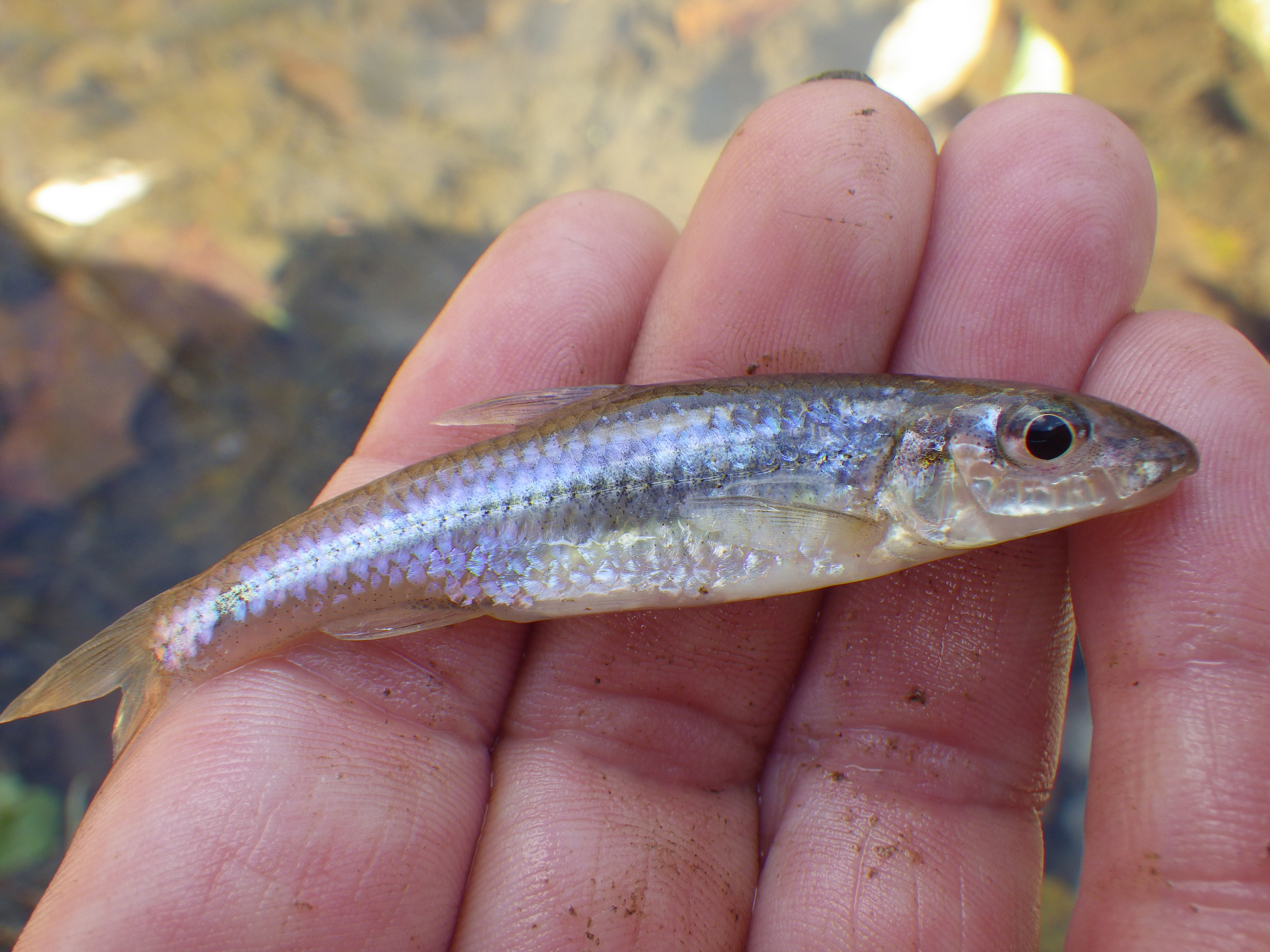
- In Goose Creek, Virginia (Potomac Drainage)

Conservation status
- Least Concern (IUCN 3.1)

- Secure (NatureServe)

Scientific classification
- Kingdom: Animalia
- Phylum: Chordata
- Class: Actinopterygii
- Order: Cypriniformes
- Family: Leuciscidae
- Subfamily: Pogonichthyinae
- Genus: Ericymba
- Species: E. buccata

Binomial name
- Ericymba buccata Cope, 1865

Synonyms
- Notropis buccatus (Cope, 1865); Leuciscus longirostris Kirtland, 1850

= Silverjaw minnow =

Species of fish

The silverjaw minnow (Ericymba buccata) is a species of freshwater ray-finned fish belonging to the family Leuciscidae, the shiners, daces and minnows. With over 300 known species, there are more species of minnows native to North America's fresh waters than any other fish. Minnows can be hard to distinguish because many look alike. All minnows have one dorsal fin, ventral fins near the anus, a lateral line system (in most species), and smooth, round cycloid scales. Their jaws lack teeth, but they have one to three rows of pharyngeal teeth to grind food. Defining physical characteristics such as the number and type of fin rays, type of scales, and pattern of pharyngeal teeth are used to distinguish minnows.

Silverjaw minnows have a head with a flat underside and large silvery-white chambers on the sides that form their complete lateral line system. Since these fish are relatively small, 2–3 inches in length, large numbers can exist in a small area and still find necessary resources. They are native to many streams and rivers in the United States in a disjunct distribution.

== Physical description ==
The silverjaw minnow has a lateral line system with many distinctive silvery-white pores connecting to an internal canal that helps the fish detect prey. One key feature of all minnows is that their dorsal fin has fewer than ten supporting structures, called rays. Silverjaw minnows have eight soft-rays which are thin, flexible membranous structures. Their dorsal fin is over their pelvic region where their ventral fins are located. They are light tan with a dark line on their back and have darkly outlined scales. Another defining feature is the presence of breast scales, which distinguishes them from the longjaw minnow. These fish are edentulous, lacking teeth on their jaws; however, they do have pharyngeal teeth in their throat. Their eyes are nearly atop their heads pointing upward. They have a slightly compressed body with the deepest part by the back of their neck. Their long snout which projects slightly past their subterminal mouth relates to their feeding behaviors as bottom dwelling fishes. Silverjaw minnows grow to be about 2–3 inches in length.

== Range/distribution ==
This species exhibits a disjunct distribution, existing in a northern and southern range in the United States. The northern range extends from eastern Missouri to Maryland, extending north into the southern Great Lakes and south to the Cumberland River Drainage in northern Tennessee. They commonly inhabit the Chesapeake Bay, Ohio River, Mississippi River, and Atlantic Coastal tributaries. The southern range includes areas of Mississippi, Louisiana, Alabama, and Georgia. Major habitats in this range include the Apalachicola River and Pearl River drainage.

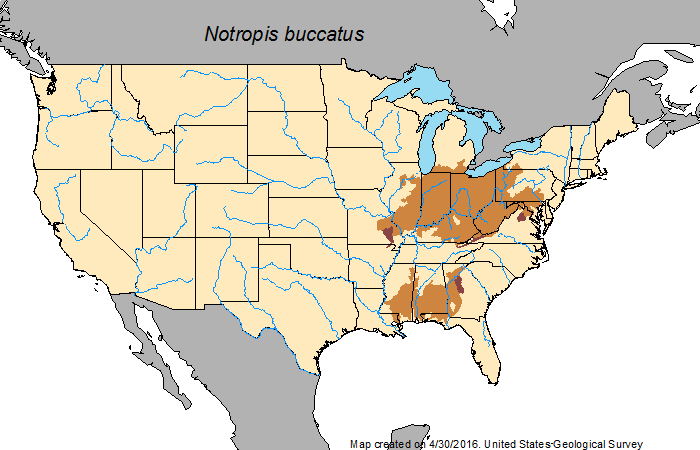
Distribution of silverjaw minnows

== Habitat ==
Silverjaw minnows exist in large schools at the bottom of shallow, freshwater creeks, streams, and small to medium rivers with gravelly or sandy floors. They prefer the continuously moving water of riffles. Typically they inhabit clear waters without silt.

== Diet and feeding behavior ==
The silverjaw minnow is a bottom-feeder that feeds mostly during the day on prey of the order Diptera including chironomids (non-biting midges), ephemeroptera (mayflies), and cladocera (water fleas). They also prey at night due to the low density of prey in the benthos. Their four main feeding behaviors are searching, mouthing, jabbing, and digging. The amount of food available and the behaviors of other individuals in the school influence which behavior is chosen. All behaviors involve skimming the bottom of the water source in search for food. Silverjaw minnows are selective feeders, only feeding on less than 50% of benthos organisms. They determine what food to consume through taste and tactile senses.

== Reproduction and life cycle ==
Silverjaw minnows have a typical life span of three to four years. Eggs hatch between late spring and late summer. Growth of fish in their second and third summers occurs from May or June to the end of July. Growth stops during the fall and winter months due to a slowed metabolic rate. Sexual maturity is obtained late in their first summer or in their second summer. Adults typically spawn in mid-spring, but spawning occurs in July for the previous year's offspring. Eggs are scattered along the bottom substrate.

== Importance to humans ==
The fishing industry economically profits from minnows as a commonly used bait. Minnows are also an important food source for larger game fish prized by fishermen.

== Etymology ==
The silverjaw minnow gets its name from silvery-looking sensory organs along its jaw. The word minnow comes from the ancient Anglo-Saxon word for small, myne. The scientific name, Ericymba buccata comes from the Greek word eri, meaning intensifying, the Greek word cymba, meaning cavity, and the Latin word buccata, meaning cheek.
