= Western silvery minnow =

Conservation status
- Near Threatened (IUCN 3.1)

Scientific classification
- Kingdom: Animalia
- Phylum: Chordata
- Class: Actinopterygii
- Order: Cypriniformes
- Family: Leuciscidae
- Subfamily: Pogonichthyinae
- Genus: Hybognathus
- Species: H. argyritis

Binomial name
- Hybognathus argyritis Girard, 1856

Species of fish

The western silvery minnow (Hybognathus argyritis) is a species of freshwater ray-finned fish belonging to the family Leuciscidae, the shiners, daces and minnows. This fish is native to North America where it is found in the Missouri River basin, the Mississippi River drainage from the mouth of the Missouri River to the mouth of Ohio River, and the South Saskatchewan River in Alberta.
