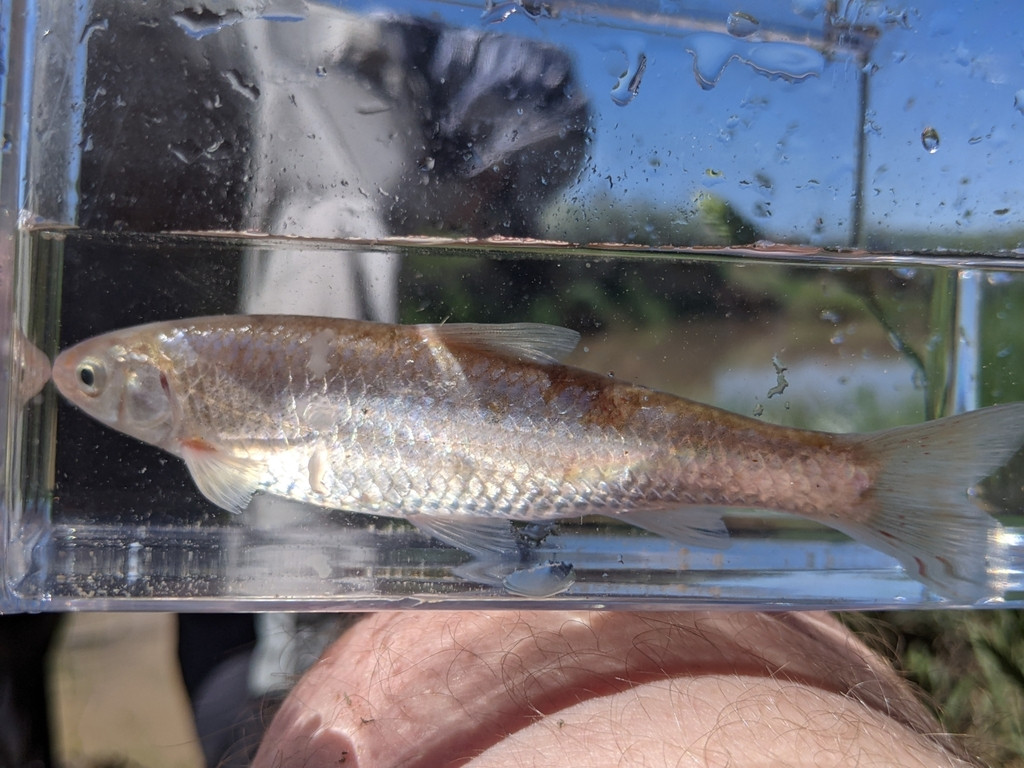

Conservation status
- Least Concern (IUCN 3.1)

- Apparently Secure (NatureServe)

Scientific classification
- Kingdom: Animalia
- Phylum: Chordata
- Class: Actinopterygii
- Order: Cypriniformes
- Family: Leuciscidae
- Subfamily: Pogonichthyinae
- Genus: Hybognathus
- Species: H. placitus

Binomial name
- Hybognathus placitus Girard, 1856

Synonyms
- Tirodon amnigenus Hay, 1882

= Plains minnow =

Species of fish

The plains minnow (Hybognathus placitus) is a species of freshwater ray-finned fish belonging to the family Leuciscidae, the shiners, daces and minnows. It is a large minnow that was once a common bait fish. The plains minnow requires shallow, slow-moving streams to complete its life cycle. Pollution, dams, and introduced sport fish have caused populations to decline.

It ranges from the Mississippi River in Tennessee west in the Missouri, Arkansas, Red, Brazos, Canadian and Colorado River drainages from Montana and North Dakota south to New Mexico and Texas. It is one of the more common fishes of the western plains.

== Physical description ==
The plains minnow is a large minnow in the family Cyprinidae that averages 127 millimetres (5 in) in total length. Their colors range from brown to olive dorsally, silver laterally, and white ventrally. The plains minnow has between 34 and 42 scales and possesses a stripe along the lateral line. The plains minnow has a slightly compressed body shape, a triangular head, and a subterminal mouth. A small knob is also present on the lower jaw.

Sexual dimorphism is present in the plains minnow. Males have larger heads, longer caudal peduncles, and shorter trunks. These differences are likely a result of sexual selection and female mate choice. The most reliable character used to tell a male from a female individual is the first dorsal fin ray, which is longer in males. Sexual dimorphism is unusual in minnows.

== Distribution and habitat ==
Plains minnows have a wide distribution across the Great Plains region of North America. There are established populations in Arkansas, Colorado, Illinois, Iowa, Kansas, Kentucky, Missouri, Montana, Nebraska, New Mexico, North Dakota, Oklahoma, South Dakota, Tennessee, Texas, Utah, and Wyoming.

Large, shallow, turbid stream channels with sandy substrates are the preferred habitat for the plains minnow. Plains minnows also appear to favor backwaters and eddies with aquatic vegetation. However, plains minnows have been found in both turbid and clear streams and are able to survive in harsh habitat when few competing species are present. Stream habitat occupied by plains minnows tend to be shallow, hypoxic, low temperature, and slow-moving.

== Diet and predators ==
There is limited information on the diet and feeding behaviors of plains minnows. Plains minnows feed on algae, microorganisms, and detritus. During spawning, they have also been observed eating their own eggs. The plains minnow is likely preyed on by larger, invasive fish species including the bluegill and largemouth bass.

== Life history ==
There is limited information available on the life history of the plains minnow. The plains minnow spawns from April to August with a peak in female reproduction in June. During spawning, females scatter eggs over sandy substrate communally. Unlike other fish, no territorial behavior over fertilized eggs or the nesting site are shown by males or females. Females become sexually mature at age 1 and produce an average of 800 eggs per year. If a female survives to age 2, her fecundity increases to an average of 2,000 eggs per year. Plains minnows are a short-lived species and have high mortality rates from egg to age 1. Very few individuals survive to age 2.

== Conservation ==
The plains minnow is federally listed as a species of least concern. The state of Colorado lists the plains minnow as endangered and Kansas lists the plains as a species in need of conservation. The states of Nebraska, South Dakota, and Wyoming do not recognize the plains minnow as a species of concern. Utah considers the species to be exotic. Dams, pollution from agricultural practices, and introduced sport fish have caused plains minnow populations to decline in some of their native range. A limited number of laws are in place to protect the plains minnow. In the state of Colorado, the plains minnow is a restricted use species. Wyoming has regulations in place to prevent plains minnow habitat loss.
