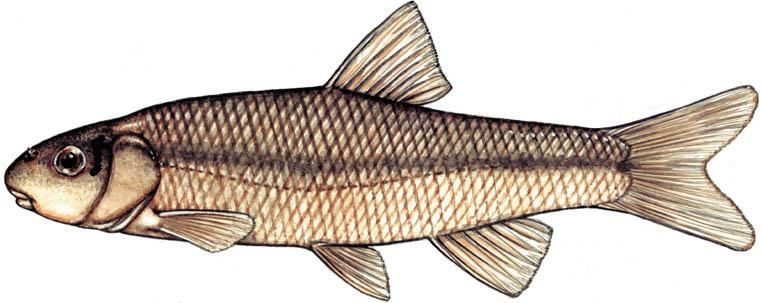
- Cutlips minnow (Exoglossum maxillingua)

Scientific classification
- Kingdom: Animalia
- Phylum: Chordata
- Class: Actinopterygii
- Division: Teleostei
- Order: Cypriniformes
- Family: Leuciscidae
- Subfamily: Pogonichthyinae
- Genus: Exoglossum; Rafinesque, 1818

Type species
- Cyprinus maxillingua Lesueur, 1817

Species
- see Text

Synonyms
- Maxillingua Rafinesque, 1818; Parexoglossum Hubbs, 1931

= Exoglossum =

Genus of fishes

Exoglossum is a genus of mound-building freshwater ray-finned fish belonging to the family Leuciscidae, the shiners, daces and minnows. containing two species, commonly known as cutlip minnows, although the individual species, particularly Exoglossum maxillingua, are also locally known by that name.

Species of this genus usually range from 3 inches to 7 inches when sexually mature. In many areas these minnows are valued as both panfish and baitfish.

== Species ==
These are the species contained in this genus:

- Exoglossum laurae (C. L. Hubbs, 1931) (Tonguetied minnow)
- Exoglossum maxillingua (Lesueur, 1817) (Cutlips minnow)
