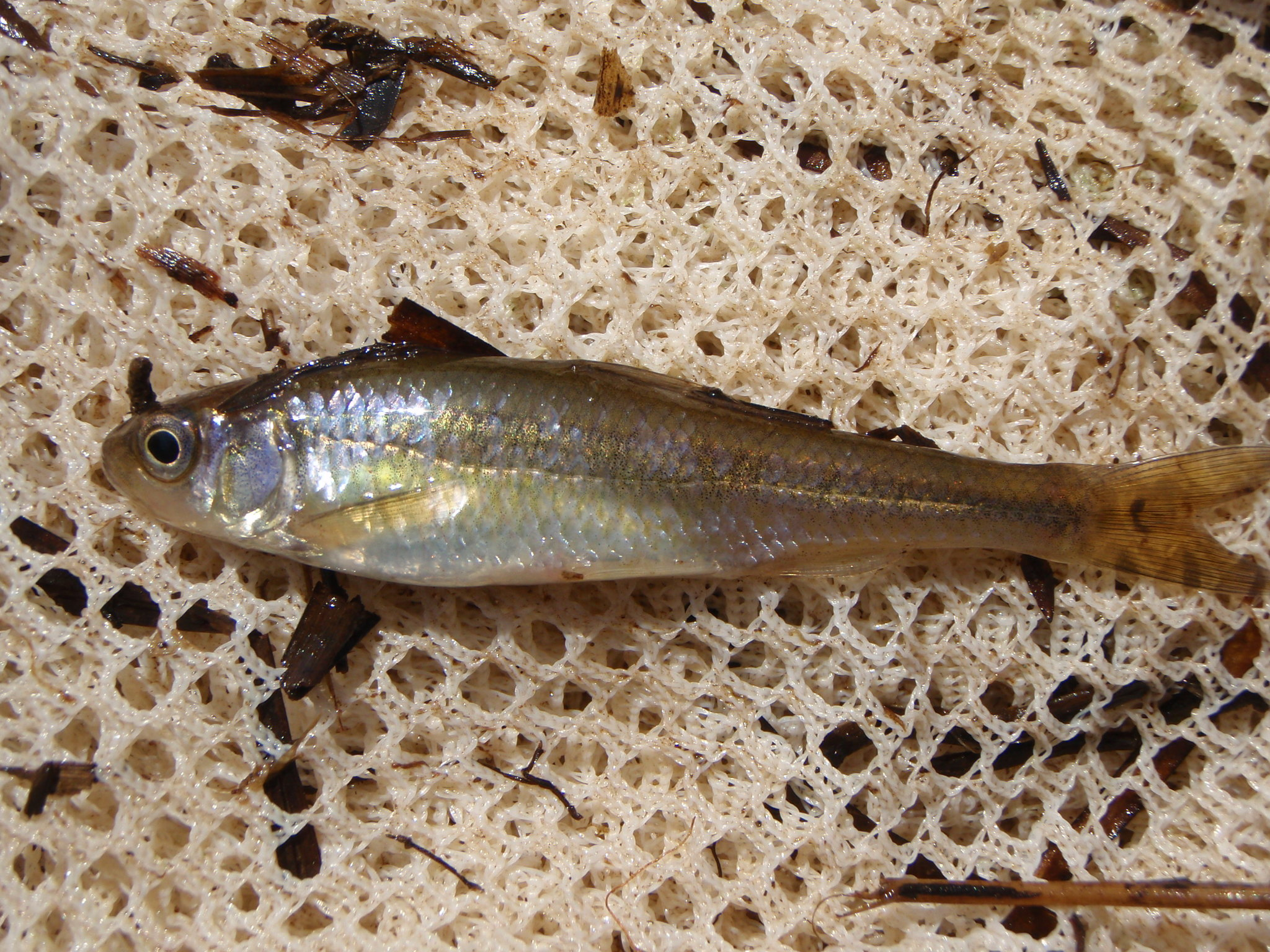
- Hybognathus hankinsoni

Conservation status
- Least Concern (IUCN 3.1)

Scientific classification
- Kingdom: Animalia
- Phylum: Chordata
- Class: Actinopterygii
- Order: Cypriniformes
- Family: Leuciscidae
- Subfamily: Pogonichthyinae
- Genus: Hybognathus
- Species: H. hankinsoni

Binomial name
- Hybognathus hankinsoni C. L. Hubbs, 1929

= Brassy minnow =

Species of fish

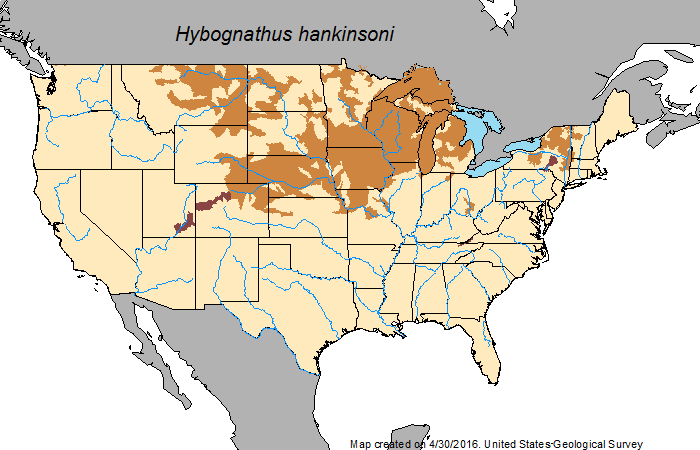
The map of the distribution of Hybognathus hankinsoni in the United States

The brassy minnow (Hybognathus hankinsoni) is a species of freshwater ray-finned fish belonging to the family Leuciscidae, the shiners, daces and minnows. The fish gets its scientific name (Hybognathus hankinsoni) from the Greek word Hybognathus, meaning bulging jaw, and hankinsoni from the American scientist, T.L. Hankinson. It is commonly found throughout the northern United States and Canada.

== Physical description ==
The brassy minnow is typically 4–7.5 cm long and weighs 0.7-4 g. It can be identified by its brassy side coloration, cream underbelly and olive green back. It has larger than usual leptoid(bony ridge) scales. and dark stripe that runs from its gill cover to its tail. Hybognathus hansinkoni have a small dorsal fin with a rounded tip, and two pelvic fins that lie behind the dorsal fin in the abdominal position. Female brassy minnows tend to be larger than the males. Additionally, brassy minnows have a small subterminal mouth with a crescent shaped lower jaw, and their caudal (tail) fins are notched.

== Distribution ==
Range extends from the St. Lawrence River and Lake Champlain drainages, throughout the Great Lakes and Northern United States and into Alberta and British Columbia.

== Habitat ==
The brassy minnow typically lives in cool, slow moving streams and creeks that have sand, mud or gravel bottoms overlaid with organic sediment. They are also found in overflow ponds near rivers, boggy lakes, brackish tidal waters, and ditches with weedy bottoms. They live in water with a large range of pH's, and are able to survive at low oxygen levels, displaying high levels of environmental tolerance. The water can be clear or turbid. Brassy minnows appear to do better in habitats with minimal predators, or those that have structure for them to hide in, as they are very susceptible to predation.

== Diet habits ==
Hybognathus hankinsoni are omnivorous eating algae, plankton and aquatic invertebrates that live in the organic sediment or the weeds that grow in their environment. Although omnivorous, the brassy minnow is typically vegetarian, mainly eating the algae, especially diatoms and desmids, found growing in the streams and ponds it inhabits. The minnows feed in schools with peak feeding times around 1–3 pm. Additionally, brassy minnows are first level consumers and are therefore important in the transfer of nutrients to higher trophic levels.

== Reproduction and lifecycle ==
The brassy minnow becomes sexually active at one to two years of age. The fish spawn (biology) during the months of April through July, depending on the location. In the more northerly range of the brassy minnow, they spawn later in the year than in the south part of their range. The spawning time occurs when the water temperature reaches sixteen to seventeen degrees Celsius. They lay their legs on the vegetation and along the bottom of the streams and ponds it inhabits. A female brassy minnow can lay up to 2500 eggs, depending on her size, and usually releases the eggs over the course of a week. The eggs take about 7–10 days to hatch and the larvae grow rapidly for the first months. The brassy minnow lives up to 5 years and spawns annually. The species is considered to be globally secure, and therefore does not have any conservation concerns.
