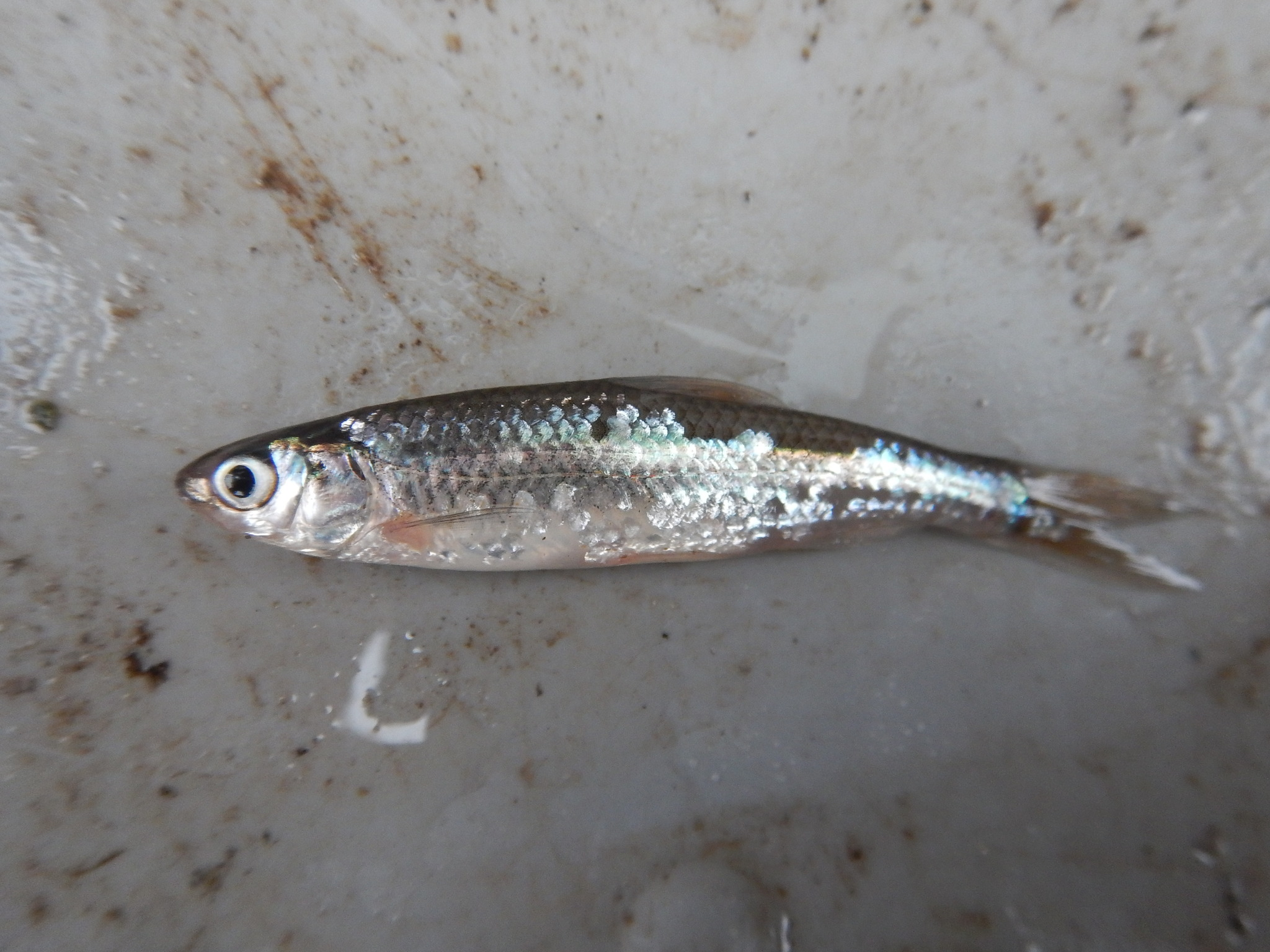

Conservation status
- Least Concern (IUCN 3.1)

Scientific classification
- Kingdom: Animalia
- Phylum: Chordata
- Class: Actinopterygii
- Order: Cypriniformes
- Family: Leuciscidae
- Subfamily: Pogonichthyinae
- Genus: Hybognathus
- Species: H. hayi

Binomial name
- Hybognathus hayi D. S. Jordan, 1885

= Cypress minnow =

Species of fish

The Cypress minnow (Hybognathus hayi) is a species of freshwater ray-finned fish belonging to the family Leuciscidae, the shiners, daces and minnows. It is endemic to the United States where it occurs in the Mississippi and Ohio drainages as well as some other rivers which drain into the Gulf of Mexico.

== Description ==
The Cypress minnow is a rather stout-bodied, silvery fish which had reasonably large eyes and a small, upward pointing mouth. The scales on anterior portion of the flanks have prominent dark edges which form an obvious diamond-shaped pattern. There are no barbels. There is a distinct dusky or greenish-golden strip down the centre of the yellowish-olive back, this stripe is wider than the base of the dorsal fin, the back also has emerald spots. The flanks are silvery, lacking any dusky stripe while the belly is. The fins lack any markings. The males develop tubercles over most of the body when breeding. Adults are 76.2 to 152.4 millimetres (3 to 6 in) in length.

== Distribution ==
The Cypress minnow is endemic to the United States where it is found in the Ohio and River basins from south western Indiana to southern Illinois south to Louisiana. It is also found in the Escambia River in Florida and Alabama and in the Sabine River in Texas.

== Habitat ==
The Cypress minnow is a lowland species which occurs in the backwaters of large, sluggish rivers and in oxbow lakes over substrates of sand, silt and organic debris. It avoids areas with faster currents.

== Biology ==
The Cypress minnow has a lengthy intestine, which loops a number of times and the length intestinal tract is suggestive of a herbivorous diet digesting plant matter. This is supported by a study in Kentucky which found that these fish consumed sand, detritus, algae and other plant materials. These fish reach sexual maturity at around a year old, at a length of 50.8 to 76.2 millimetres (2 to 3 in). They appear to spawn in the spring, and as in its congeners the eggs are likely that to be scattered over the substrate with no parental care of either the eggs or the young.

== Conservation ==
The Cypress minnow is not common and has been described as being sporadic or rare, and to have declined drastically in abundance at the edges of its range in the states of Indiana, Illinois, Kentucky, Missouri, Oklahoma, Florida, and Arkansas. However, its historical range within most of these states was rather limited in extent. The species was collected in Indiana since the early 1940s where it is known from 4 localities and it was only recently rediscovered in Missouri and Illinois. Cypress minnows may have become extinct in the southern bend of the Tennessee River in Alabama. In the core parts of the range, recent surveys indicate that the species is apparently maintaining its populations. The population trend is uncertain but the Cypress minnow probably has a relatively stable or slowly declining population.
