= Ericymba =

Scientific classification
- Kingdom: Animalia
- Phylum: Chordata
- Class: Actinopterygii
- Division: Teleostei
- Order: Cypriniformes
- Suborder: Cyprinoidei
- Family: Leuciscidae
- Subfamily: Pogonichthyinae
- Genus: Ericymba; Cope, 1865

Type species
- Ericymba buccata Cope, 1865

Genus of fishes

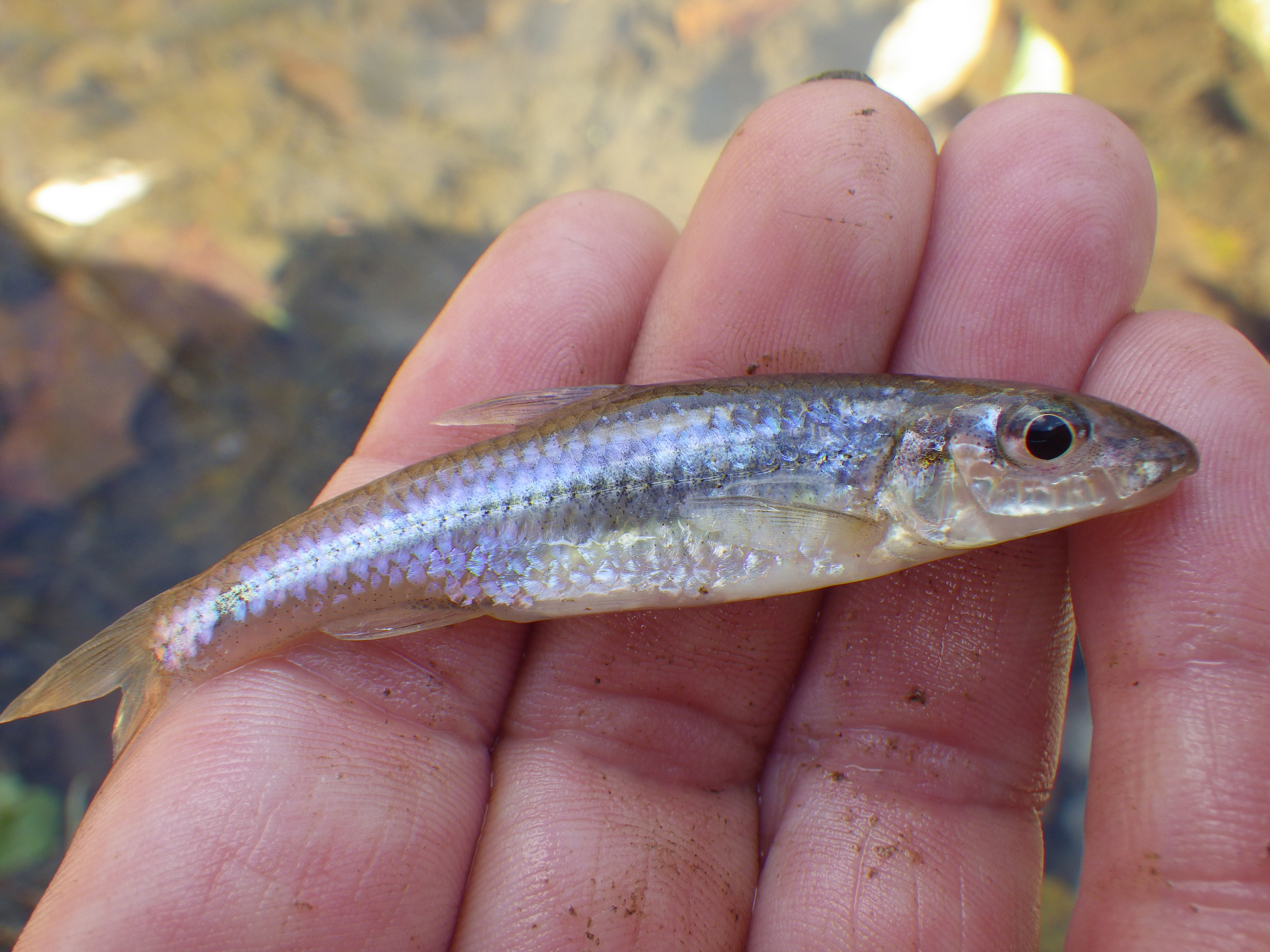

Ericymba is a genus of fish belonging to the family Leuciscidae, the shiners, daces and minnows. They are native to North America.

== Species ==
The currently recognized species in this genus are :

- Ericymba amplamala (Pera & Armbruster, 2006) (Longjaw minnow)
- Ericymba buccata Cope, 1865 (Silverjaw minnow)
- Ericymba dorsalis (Agassiz 1854) (Bigmouth shiner)
