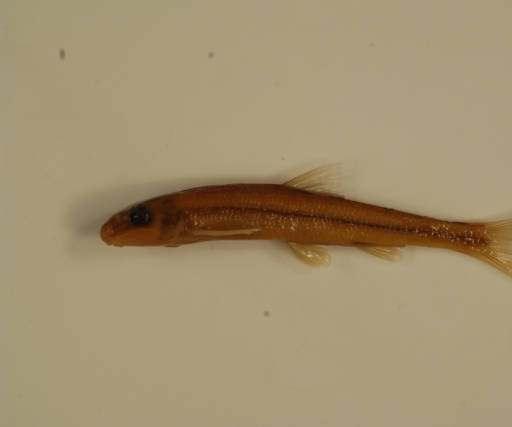

Conservation status
- Least Concern (IUCN 3.1)

Scientific classification
- Kingdom: Animalia
- Phylum: Chordata
- Class: Actinopterygii
- Order: Cypriniformes
- Family: Leuciscidae
- Subfamily: Pogonichthyinae
- Genus: Phenacobius
- Species: P. catostomus

Binomial name
- Phenacobius catostomus D. S. Jordan, 1877

= Riffle minnow =

Species of fish

The riffle minnow (Phenacobius catostomus) is a species of freshwater ray-finned fish beloinging to the family Leuciscidae, the shiners, daces and minnows. It inhabits riffles in warm streams of medium to large size, in the states of Alabama, Georgia, and Tennessee, above the Fall Line. Long and slender, it averages about 3.5 inches (8.9 cm) in length. The riffle minnow is olive on top, and white below.

This fish is not to be confused with Alburnoides bipunctatus, which is also known as riffle minnow, but lives in Europe and Asia.
