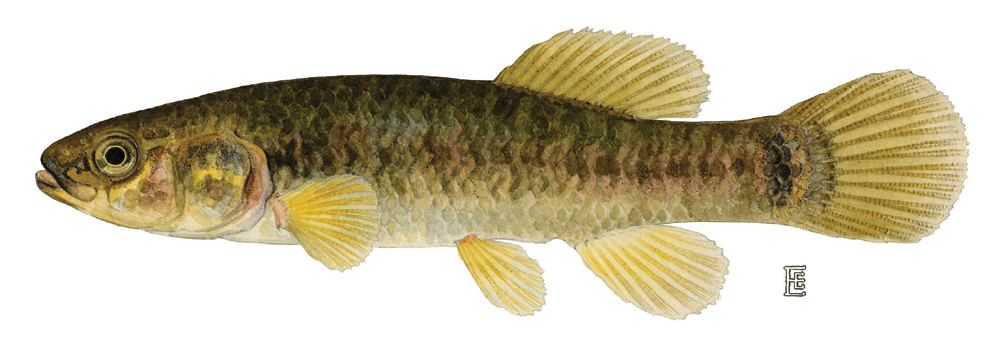

Conservation status
- Least Concern (IUCN 3.1)

Scientific classification
- Kingdom: Animalia
- Phylum: Chordata
- Class: Actinopterygii
- Order: Salmoniformes
- Family: Umbridae
- Genus: Umbra
- Species: U. limi

Binomial name
- Umbra limi J. P. Kirtland, 1841

= Central mudminnow =

Species of fish

The central mudminnow (Umbra limi) is a small fish in the family Umbridae of the order Esociformes. It is found in central and eastern North America in productive waters. It is fairly tolerant of low oxygen concentrations and, as a result, it is sometimes the only, or one of a very few, fish species present in waters susceptible to winter or summer kill.

== Description ==
The central mudminnow lives in slow-moving water around ponds, lakes, and streams in central North America, and ranges in length from 51–102 mm. It burrows tail-first in mud and can tolerate low oxygen levels, allowing it to live in waterways unavailable to other fishes. Its coloration matches this habitat, being brownish above with mottled sides and a pale belly. It is eaten by many species of fish such as grass pickerel, sunfishes, northern pike, and catfishes; it is also preyed upon by birds, foxes, and snakes when caught out of water. According to Paszkowski and Tonn, mudminnows perform better in environments with other fish species than in environments with just mudminnows, because the "interspecific interactions override a similar contribution for the mudminnow, which is regarded as a fugitive species". Central mudminnows are known to eat a large variety of zooplankton and benthic and epiphytic macroinvertebrates. Adults are also known to feed energetically in the winter months on littoral fish. One experiment conducted by Colgan and Silburt resulted in mudminnows typically feeding more on benthic than planktonic resources, with zooplankton making up only 0.7% out of 511 items found in the stomach. This mudminnow uses a modified gas bladder to breathe air pockets trapped between the ice and water during the winter to feed and stay active.

== Distribution ==
Umbra limi is a widely distributed species that inhabits many freshwater systems such as lakes, streams, and wetlands near the littoral zone, or near the shore, and around dense cover in central North America west of the Appalachian Mountains, including the St. Lawrence River, Great Lakes, Hudson Bay, Red River, and the Mississippi River basins from Quebec to Manitoba and south to central Ohio, western Tennessee, and northeastern Arkansas. The central mudminnow has also been introduced into many of the tributaries in Connecticut and Massachusetts. Their habitats being marshy lands and rivers are under attack by human development and contact constantly and is likely causing a decline in their populations.

== Ecology ==
The central mudminnow is carnivorous and typically feeds in the benthic area of freshwater habitats. According to Colgan and Silburt, it prefers amphipods, coleopterans, and anisopterans while avoiding zooplankton and other planktonic species. In a study by Colgan and Silburt, they found that an average of only 0.9% of the contents of dissected stomachs of U. limi contained zooplankton. Chironoids and gastropods, when taken from the dissection, had a combined volume of about 60%, which proves that the mudminnow feeds mainly in benthic areas.

This fish seems to prefer water with low dissolved oxygen levels, warmer temperatures, and low flow. It is able to live in hypoxic conditions because of its ability to breathe air. This species is also known to feed in the winter in temperatures as low as 1.1 °C. According to Jenkins and Miller, some animals that feed on the mudminnow are the grass pickerel, sunfishes, northern pike, and catfishes; it is also preyed upon by birds, foxes, and snakes when caught out of water. This mudminnow is known to bury itself in the mud or sand to avoid capture in some situations. Also, Jenkins and Miller found that the mudminnow is a shoaling fish; they prefer to be with other mudminnows rather than by themselves. This shoaling mechanism seems to reduce their predation risk.

== Life history ==
The central mudminnow tends to spawn in mid-April in temperatures of 13 °C with the higher temperature stimulating the spawning. Spawning can take place in shallow waters and produce up to 2,500 eggs in one season. The average age of the central mudminnow is three, while they can reach ages of five or six. Females are typically larger than males when compared around age two. The egg stage is generally six days and then they enter the larval stage of development.
