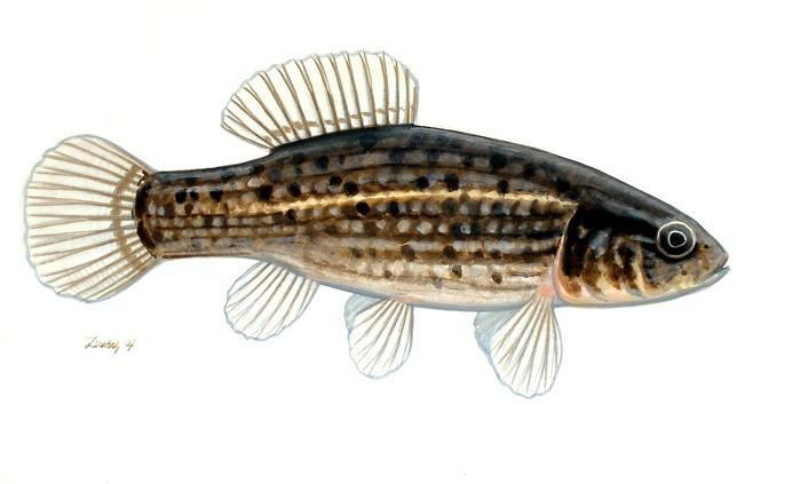
- Umbra krameri

Scientific classification
- Kingdom: Animalia
- Phylum: Chordata
- Class: Actinopterygii
- Order: Salmoniformes
- Suborder: Esocoidei
- Family: Umbridae; Bonaparte, 1845

Genera
- †Boltyshia; †Palaeoesox; †Proumbra; Umbra

= Umbridae =

Umbridae Temporal range: Late Paleocene–present Possible Maastrichtian occurrence

Family of ray-finned fishes

Umbridae is a family of ray-finned fish in the order Salmoniformes. The single living genus, Umbra, occupies weed-choked freshwater habitats in eastern North America and eastern Europe. While the family traditionally contained the genera Umbra, Novumbra, and Dallia, recent genetic and paleontological research have recovered this grouping as paraphyletic, with Novumbra and Dallia being moved to the family Esocidae.

== Distribution ==
Umbridae contains three extant species, all within the genus Umbra: Umbra pygmaea, Umbra limi, and Umbra krameri. U. pygmaea can be found across the eastern United States and southeastern Canada. U. limi ranges throughout the Great Lakes region and Mississippi River basin of North America. U. krameri can be found in the Danube and Dniester River basins of Europe. Umbra spp. are most commonly found in the Atlantic coast regions of North America, along the marshy, low-oxygen areas of the Mississippi River, and in similar environments in Europe. All fossil specimens have been recovered from Europe, occupying similar niches to extant species.

== Behavior ==
The extant species of Esocidae are sight-based ambush predators, while umbrids occupying the niche of a bottom-feeding generalist. Diet changes based on seasonal availability, however primarily consists of invertebrates in all extant species. Detritus is also a major stomach content throughout the year as reported in U. pygmaea. During winter months, U. limi has been observed hunting fish. Cannibalism has been observed in at least U. pygmaea.

Umbrids, like Dallia and Novumbra, have an extreme tolerance for hypoxic conditions. Umbra has been observed surviving under ice in particularly cold winters, and has the ability to survive desiccation by burrowing tail-first into mud in times of drought. Umbra can breathe atmospheric air using a modified gas bladder to absorb oxygen.

== Evolution ==
The earliest potential fossil record of the Umbridae are small esocoid palatine bones with attached teeth, recovered from the Maastrichtian-aged Hell Creek Formation of the western United States. In addition to providing evidence of this family existing during the Cretaceous, these also suggest that early umbrids may have had retractable teeth akin to those of their relatives, the esocids. The later umbrid Palaeoesox also shows similar traits.

Umbrids have been present in Europe with fossils of the primitive genus Boltyshia dating back to the Paleocene. Following Boltyshia, fossils of Palaeoesox, another primitive genus, entered the known fossil record in the Middle Eocene. In contrast to Boltyshia, Palaeoesox had a much longer stratigraphical range, surviving until possibly the Late Miocene based on otoliths assigned to the genus, though at least the Middle Miocene based on the presence of body fossils. Palaeoesox overlaps its temporal range with Umbra; the two species coexisted within Europe for at least 10 million years, as fossils of the earliest members of the genus Umbra have been recovered during the latest Oligocene. A single species has been assigned to the genus Proumbra, which was recovered in fossil beds dating to the late Oligocene.

Genetic work has reported that separation of the European and North American species in the genus Umbra occurred roughly at the end of the Late Cretaceous and earliest half of the Paleogene, at the date of 60.57 million years ago with the 95% highest probability density of 39.57-81.75. The cause of the split in the genus coincides with the separation of the European and North American continents.

One of the basalmost genera, Palaeoesox, preserves depressible teeth similar to those of Esox. This trait may have been present in the last common ancestor of Esocidae before the umbrid/esocid split, and is lost today in Umbra, Dallia, and Novumbra.

The following cladogram illustrates the relationship between umbrid genera.

- Esociformes
  - Esocidae
  - Umbridae
    - †Boltyshia
    - - †Palaeoesox
      - - †Proumbra
        - - Umbra
