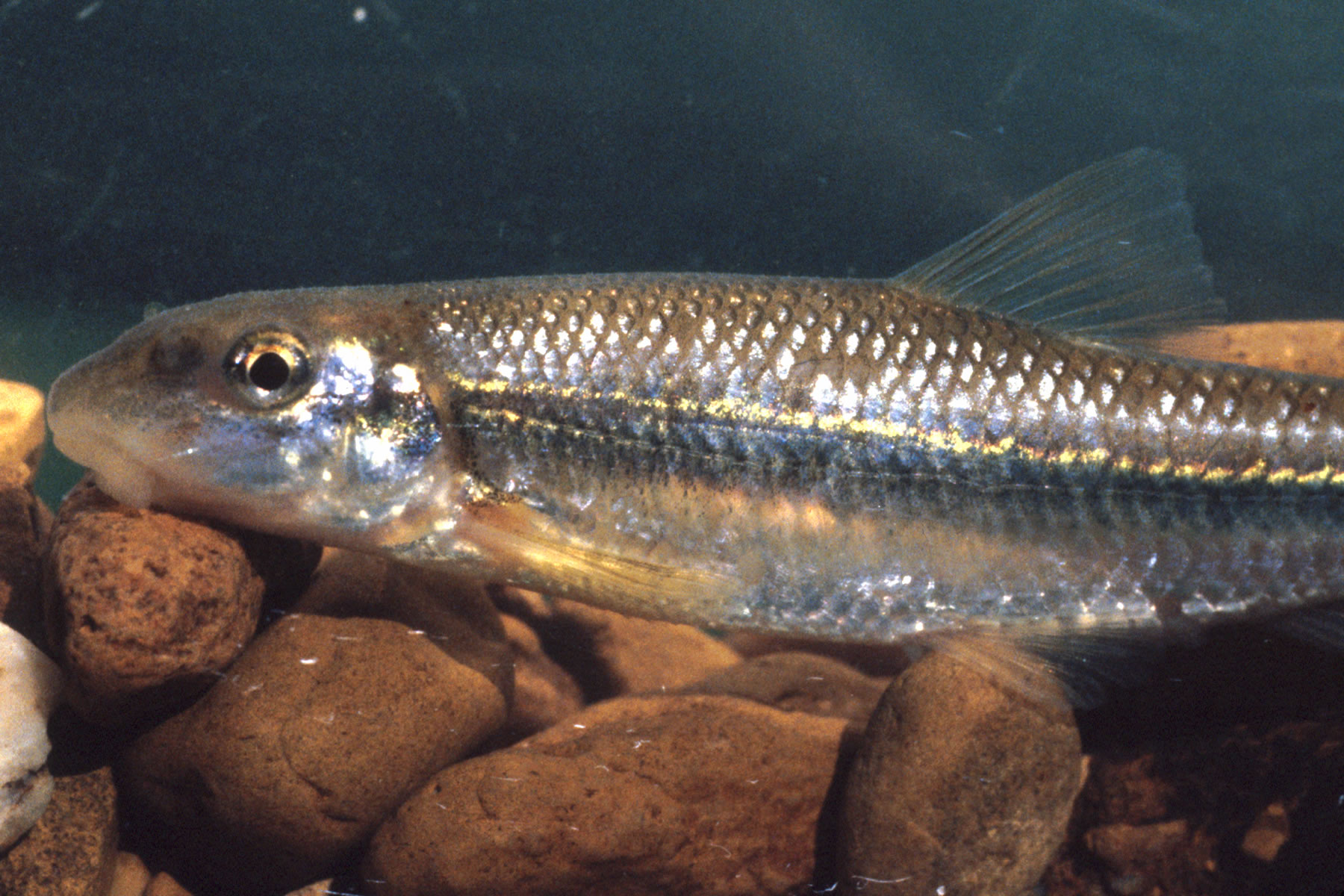

Conservation status
- Least Concern (IUCN 3.1)

Scientific classification
- Kingdom: Animalia
- Phylum: Chordata
- Class: Actinopterygii
- Division: Teleostei
- Order: Cypriniformes
- Family: Leuciscidae
- Subfamily: Pogonichthyinae
- Genus: Phenacobius
- Species: P. mirabilis

Binomial name
- Phenacobius mirabilis (Girard, 1856)

Synonyms
- Exoglossum mirabile Girard, 1856; Sarcidium scopiferum Cope, 1871; Phenacobius teretulus var. liosternus E. W. Nelson, 1876

= Phenacobius mirabilis =

Species of fish

Phenacobius mirabilis, or the suckermouth minnow, is a species of freshwater ray-finned fish beloinging to the family Leuciscidae, the shiners, daces and minnows. This species is found in North America where it occurs in the Mississippi River basin from Ohio and West Virginia to Wyoming, Colorado and New Mexico, and from southeastern Minnesota to northern Alabama, eastern Oklahoma and southern Kansas. It also occurs in the western Lake Erie drainage in Ohio.

== Ecology ==
The suckermouth minnow inhabits small- to moderate-size streams and rivers with clear to turbid water. They prefer a water temperature of 5–25 degrees Celsius and a mixed sandy gravel substrate. Streams with permanent flow and riffles with little siltation are ideal for this species. A highly adaptable species, it has been observed that these minnows can travel long distances. Suckermouth minnows often can be observed swimming along the sandy gravel, where they feed on chironomid midge larvae and pupae, caddisfly larvae and plankton. They can be cannibalistic.

== Appearance ==
This species gets its name from its sucker-like mouth and fleshy lower lip. They are bicolored, meaning the dorsal side is a brownish tone and the ventral side is a silvery white shade. A thin black stripe separates the colors, and a black spot is located on the base of the caudal fin. Males typically are more colorful, while females are larger to aid in reproduction. They range from 5–13 cm.

== Life cycle ==
Phenacobius mirabilis spawn in groups in between late spring and early summer. Spawning temperatures are around 14–25 degrees Celsius, while temperatures required for the embryos to hatch is around 17 to 23 degrees Celsius. These eggs are laid in gravel beds and require no parental care. This species has a lifespan of 3–5 years.
