= Longjaw minnow =

Conservation status
- Least Concern (IUCN 3.1)

Scientific classification
- Kingdom: Animalia
- Phylum: Chordata
- Class: Actinopterygii
- Order: Cypriniformes
- Family: Leuciscidae
- Subfamily: Pogonichthyinae
- Genus: Ericymba
- Species: E. amplamala

Binomial name
- Ericymba amplamala (Pera & Armbruster, 2006)

Synonyms
- Notropis amplamala Pera & Armbruster, 2006

Species of fish

The longjaw minnow (Ericymba amplamala) is a species of freshwater ray-finned fish belonging to the family Leuciscidae, the shiners, daces and minnows. This species is endemic to the southeastern United States.
