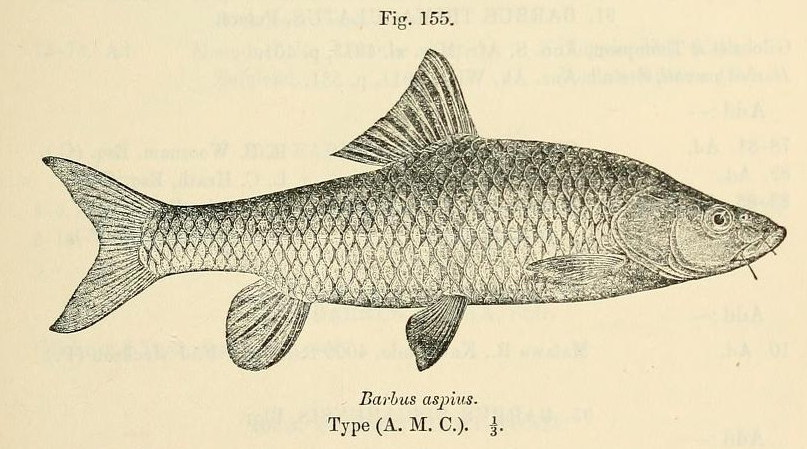

Conservation status
- Least Concern (IUCN 3.1)

Scientific classification
- Kingdom: Animalia
- Phylum: Chordata
- Class: Actinopterygii
- Order: Cypriniformes
- Family: Cyprinidae
- Subfamily: Torinae
- Genus: Labeobarbus
- Species: L. aspius

Binomial name
- Labeobarbus aspius (Boulenger, 1912)

Synonyms
- Barbus aspius Boulenger, 1912

= Labeobarbus aspius =

Species of fish

Labeobarbus aspius, the Drakensberg minnow or Maluti minnow, is a species of cyprinid fish endemic to the Congo Democratic Republic.
