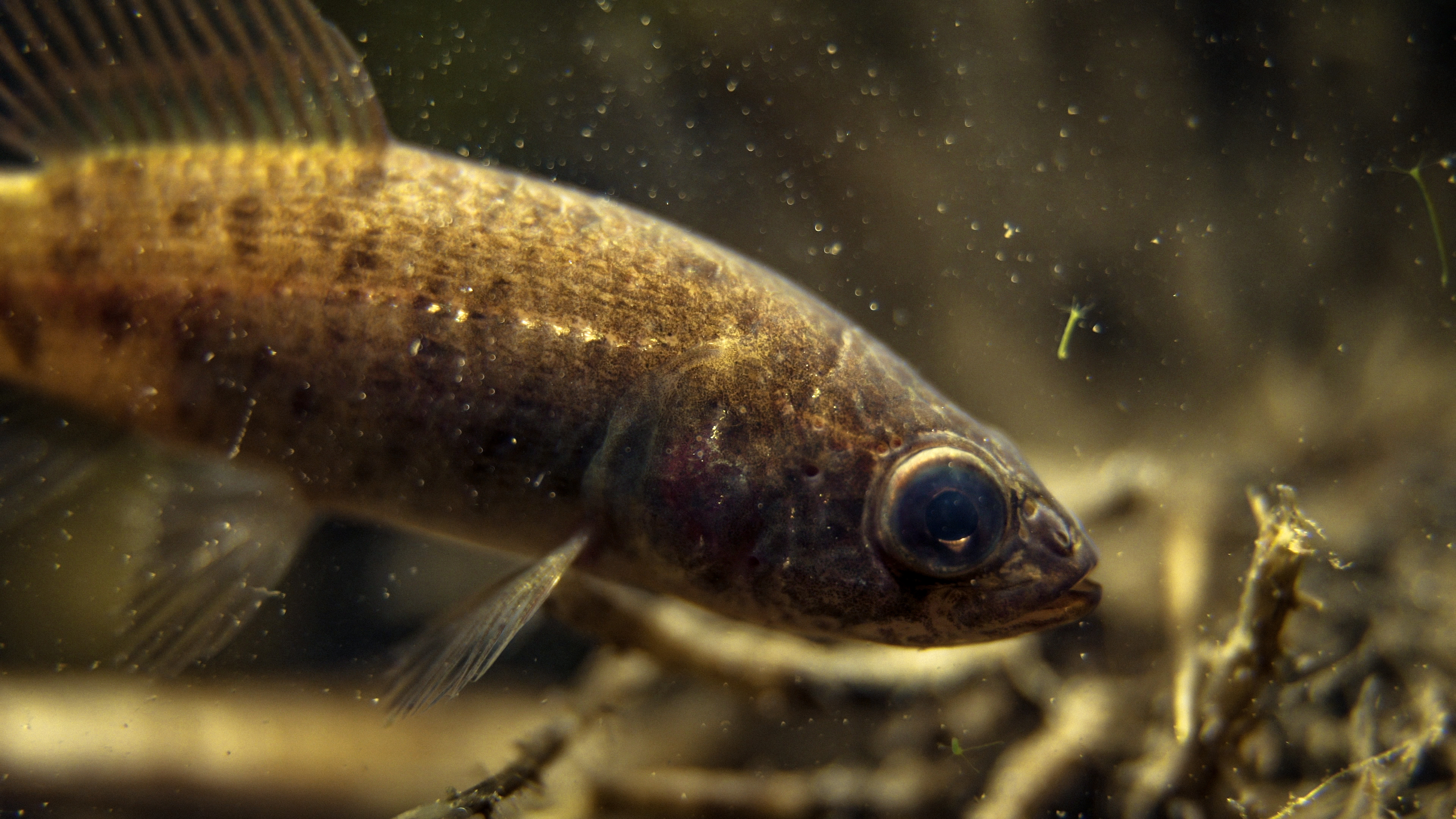

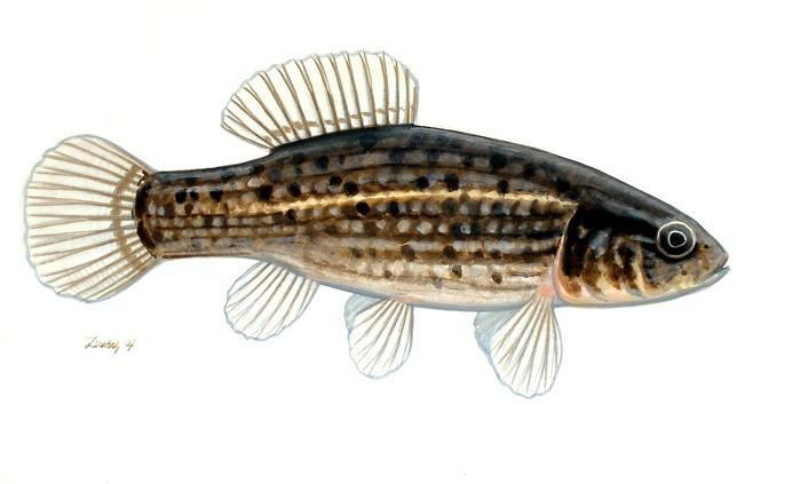

Conservation status
- Vulnerable (IUCN 3.1)

Scientific classification
- Kingdom: Animalia
- Phylum: Chordata
- Class: Actinopterygii
- Division: Teleostei
- Order: Salmoniformes
- Family: Umbridae
- Genus: Umbra
- Species: U. krameri

Binomial name
- Umbra krameri Walbaum, 1792
- Range of U. krameri Resident Extinct

Synonyms
- List: Aphyra lacustris Grossinger, 1794; Cyprinodon umbra Cuvier, 1829; Umbra canina Károli, 1882; Umbra krameri Fitzinger, 1832; Umbra krameri subsp. pavlovi Kux & Libosvarsky, 1957; Umbra lacustris Hankó, 1923; Umbra lucifuga Gronow, 1854

= European mudminnow =

Species of fish

The European mudminnow (Umbra krameri) is a species of fish in the Umbridae family found in Austria, Bosnia and Herzegovina, Bulgaria, Croatia, Hungary, Moldova, Romania, Serbia, Slovakia, Slovenia, and Ukraine within the Danube and Dniester river drainage basins. Widespread loss of wetland habitat, agricultural impacts, channelization, climate change and invasive species are contributing to declines, and the International Union for Conservation of Nature classifies this formerly abundant species as vulnerable to extinction within its indigenous range. An introduced population exists in northern Germany.

== Description ==
The body of the European mudminnow is long and cylindrical, length ranges from 65-100mm, their coloration is from green to brown, with under-shading and gray to dark brown mottled spots. Distinct Dark lateral stripping, most noticeable in juvenile specimens. Often found in stagnant murky water, why the umbra of the genus name is called that, found in fresh water often among living and dead plants. Its flat head and small mouth facilitate navigation in the crowded environment.
