= List of fishes of Austria =

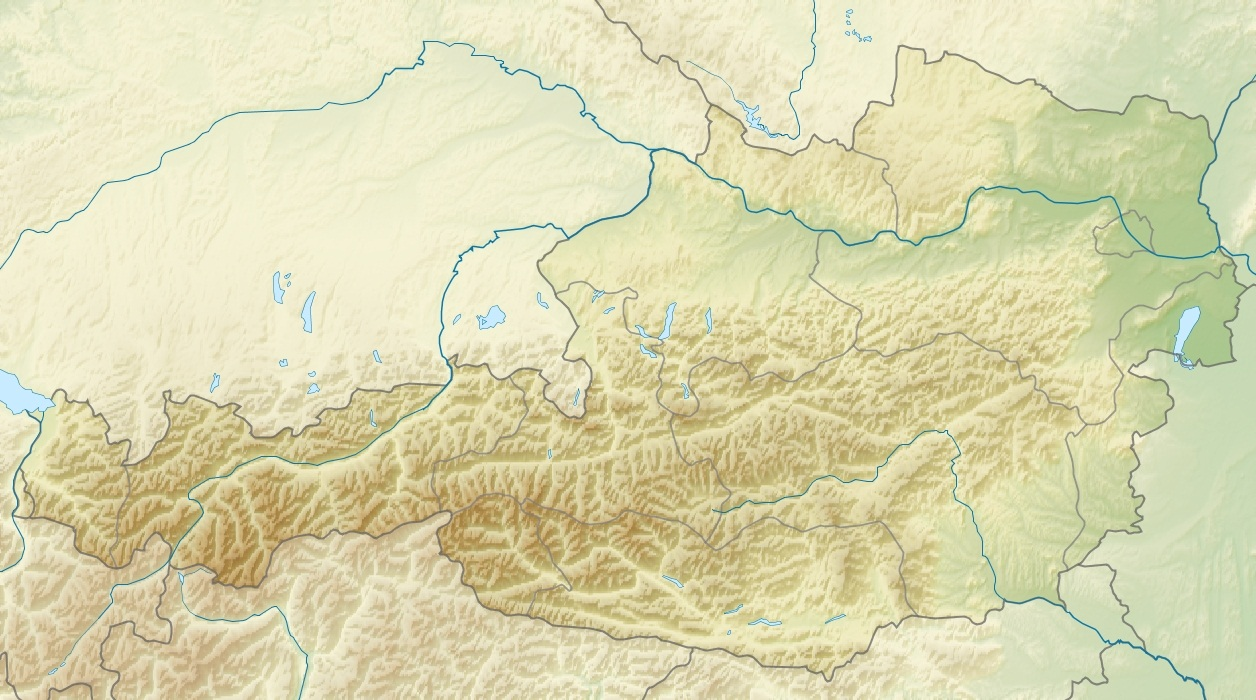
Relief map of Austria

The list of fish in Austria consists of indigenous, and also introduced species. In total it consists of 98 species, including 5 which are extinct. The following tags note species in each of those categories:

- (I) - Introduced
- (En) - Endemic
- (Ex) - Extirpated
- (E) - Extinct

== Order Petromyzontiformes (lampreys) ==
Family Petromyzontidae (northern lampreys)

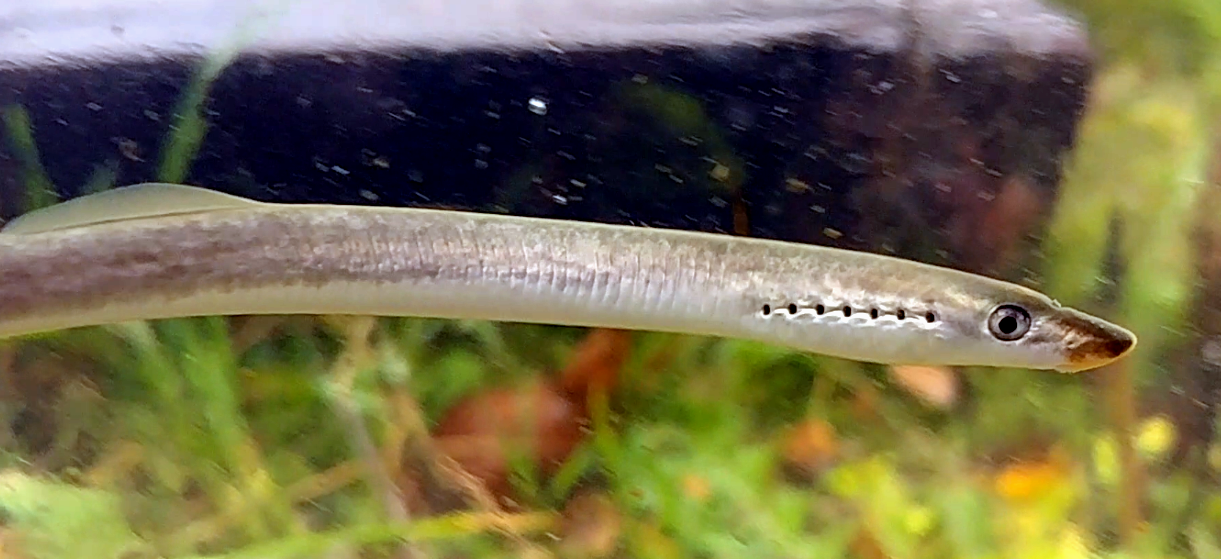
European brook lamprey

- Ukrainian brook lamprey (Eudontomyzon mariae)
- Danubian brook lamprey (Eudontomyzon vladykovi)
- European brook lamprey (Lampetra planeri)

== Order Acipenseriformes (sturgeons and paddlefishes) ==
Family Acipenseridae (sturgeon)

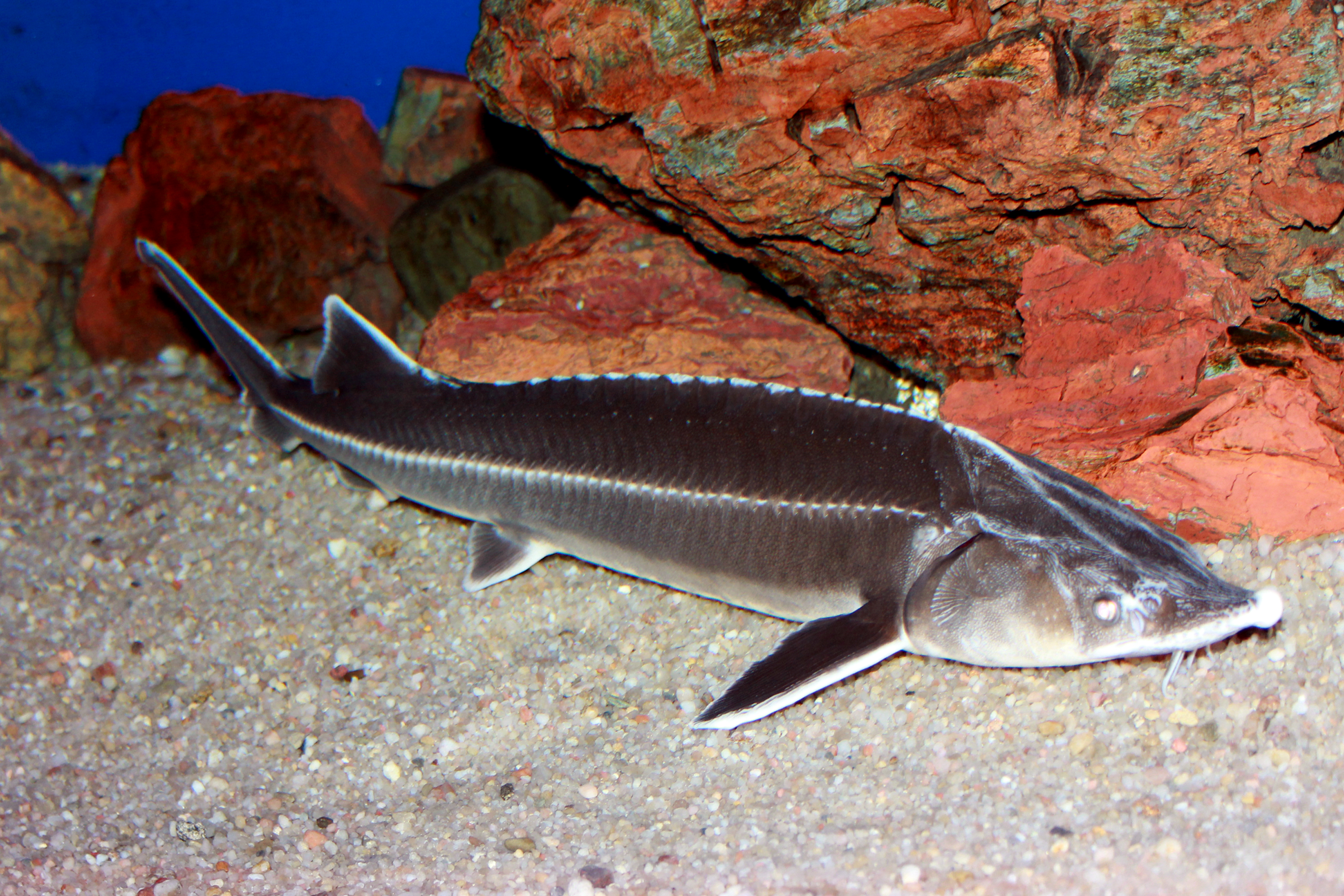
Sterlet

- Sterlet (Acipenser ruthenus)
- Russian sturgeon (Acipenser gueldenstaedtii) (Ex)
- Bastard sturgeon (Acipenser nudiventris) (Ex)
- Starry sturgeon (Acipenser stellatus) (Ex)
- Beluga (Huso huso) (Ex)

== Order Anguilliformes (eels) ==
Family Anguillidae (freshwater eels)

- European eel (Anguilla anguilla)

== Order Cypriniformes (carps, minnows and relatives) ==
Family Cobitidae (true loaches)

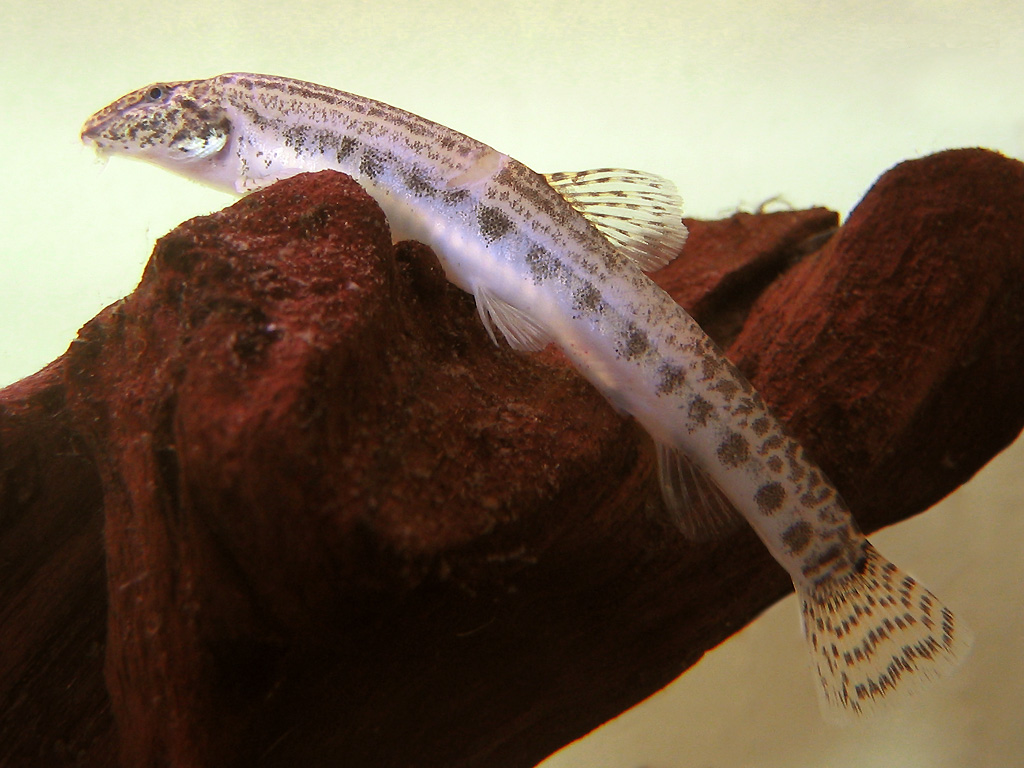
Spined loach

- Cobitis elongatoides
- Spined loach (Cobitis taenia)
- Weatherfish (Misgurnus fossilis)
- Balkan golden loach (Sabanejewia balcanica)

Family Nemacheilidae (stone loaches)

- Stone loach (Barbatula barbatula)

Family Cyprinidae (carp and minnows)

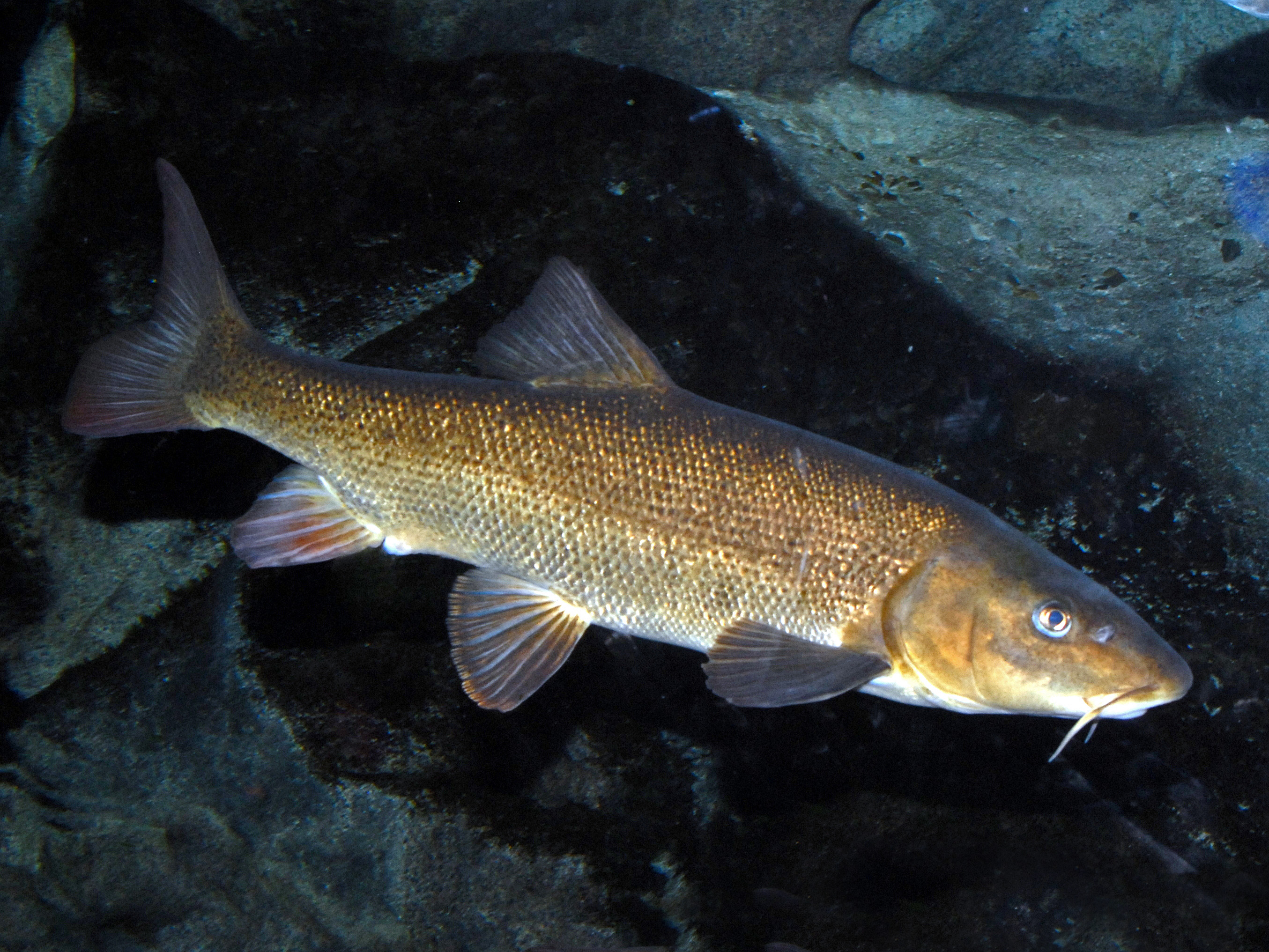
Italian barbel

- Danube barbel (Barbus balcanicus)
- Common barbel (Barbus barbus)
- Carpathian barbel (Barbus carpathicus)
- Mediterranean barbel (Barbus meridionalis)
- Italian barbel (Barbus plebejus)
- Goldfish (Carassius auratus) (I)
- Crucian carp (Carassius carassius)
- Prussian carp (Carassius gibelio)
- Common carp (Cyprinus carpio)

Family Tincidae (tenches)

- Tench (Tinca tinca)

Family Acheilognathidae (bitterling-like cyprinids)

- European bitterling (Rhodeus amarus)

Family Gobionidae (gudgeons)

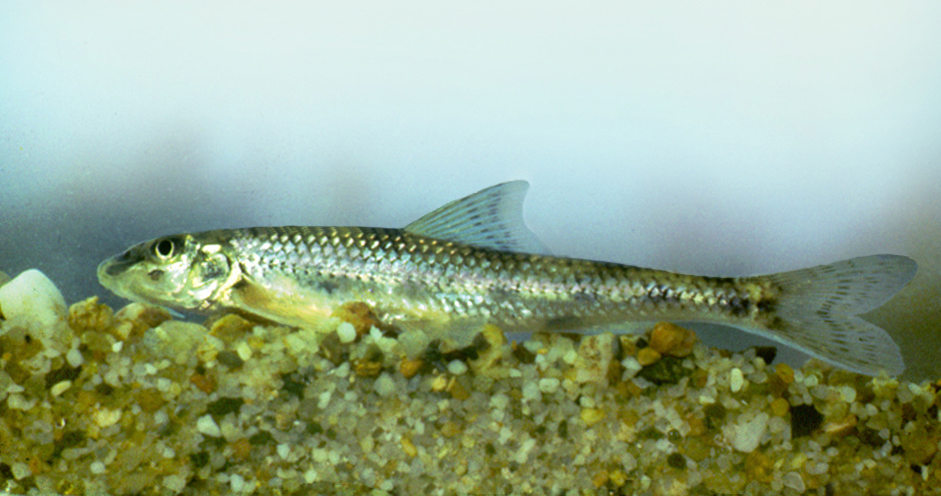
Kessler's gudgeon

- Gudgeon (Gobio gobio)
- Stone moroko (Pseudorasbora parva) (I)
- Kessler's gudgeon (Romanogobio kesslerii)
- Danubian gudgeon (Romanogobio uranoscopus)
- Danube whitefin gudgeon (Romanogobio vladykovi)

Family Leuciscidae (true minnows)

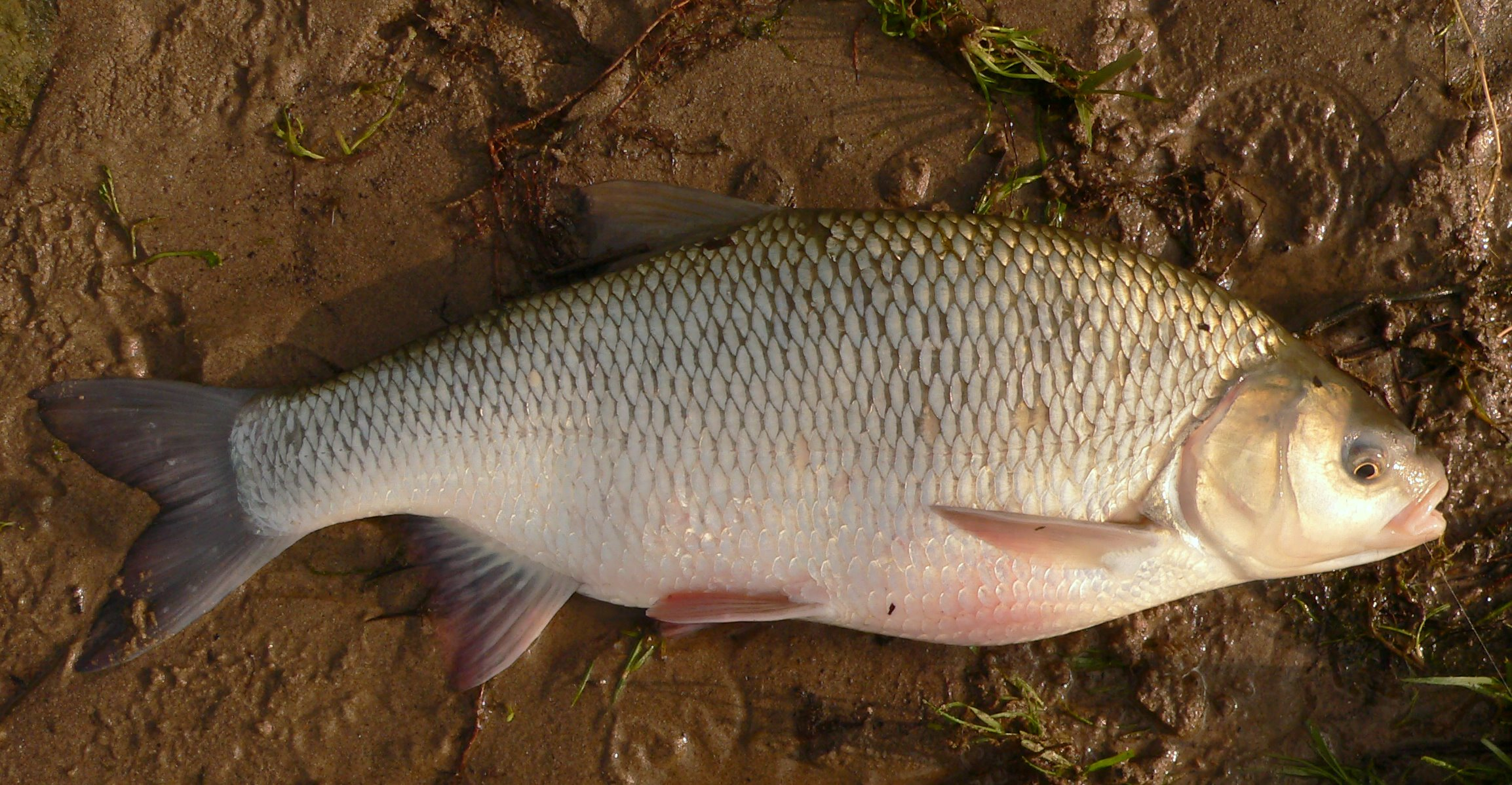
Ide

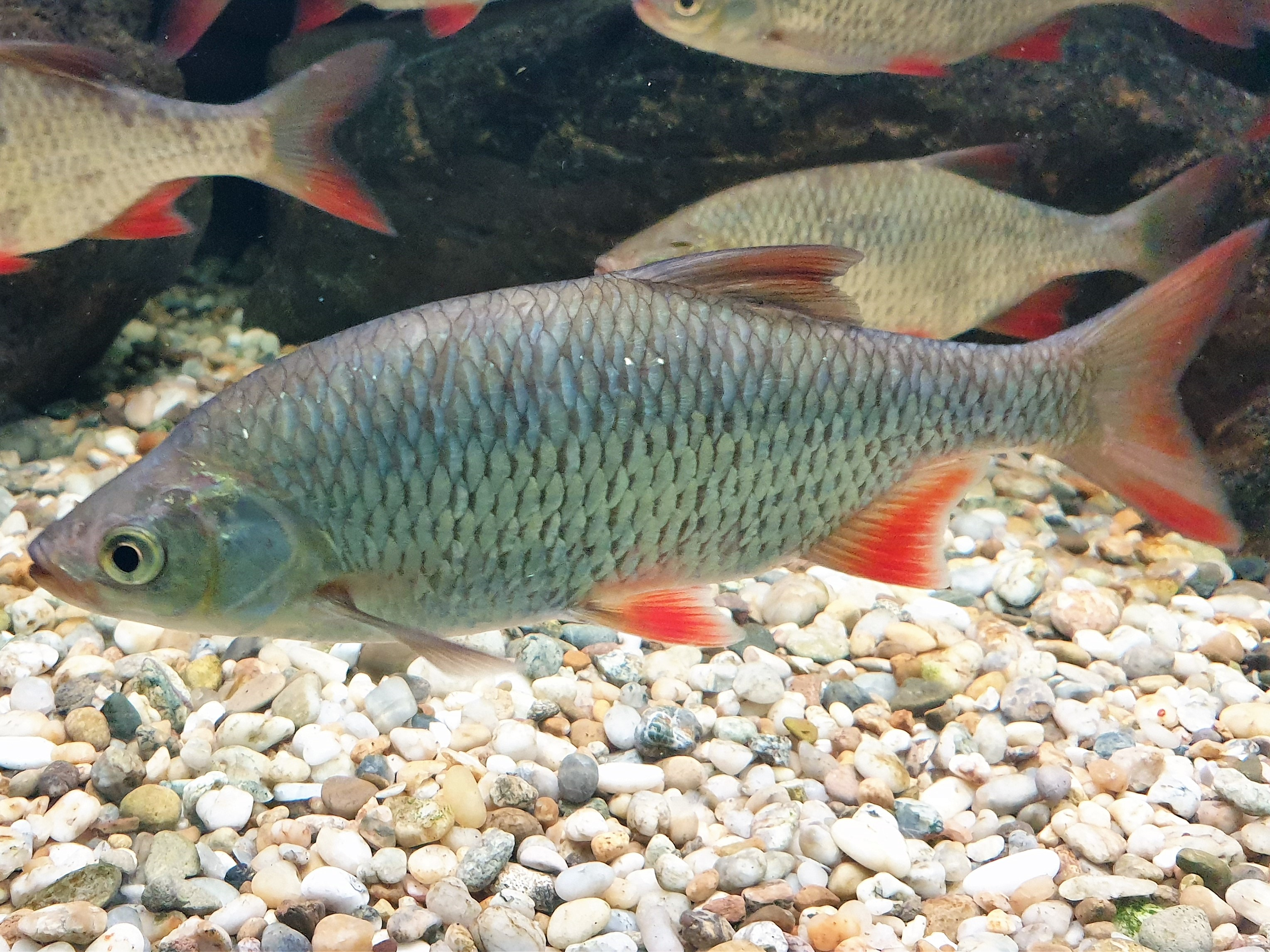
Rudd

- Common bream (Abramis brama)
- Schneider (Alburnoides bipunctatus)
- Common bleak (Alburnus alburnus)
- Danube bleak (Alburnus chalcoides)
- Alburnus mento
- Zope (Ballerus ballerus)
- White-eye bream (Ballerus sapa)
- White bream (Blicca bjoerkna)
- Common nase (Chondrostoma nasus)
- Sunbleak (Leucaspius delineatus)
- Asp (Leuciscus aspius)
- Ide (Leuciscus idus)
- Common dace (Leuciscus leuciscus)
- Ziege (Pelecus cultratus)
- Common minnow (Phoxinus phoxinus)
- Pearl roach (Rutilus meidingeri)
- Common roach (Rutilus rutilus)
- Common rudd (Scardinius erythrophthalmus)
- Chub (Squalius cephalus)
- Souffia (Telestes souffia)
- Vimba elongata
- Vimba bream (Vimba vimba)

== Order Siluriformes (catfishes) ==
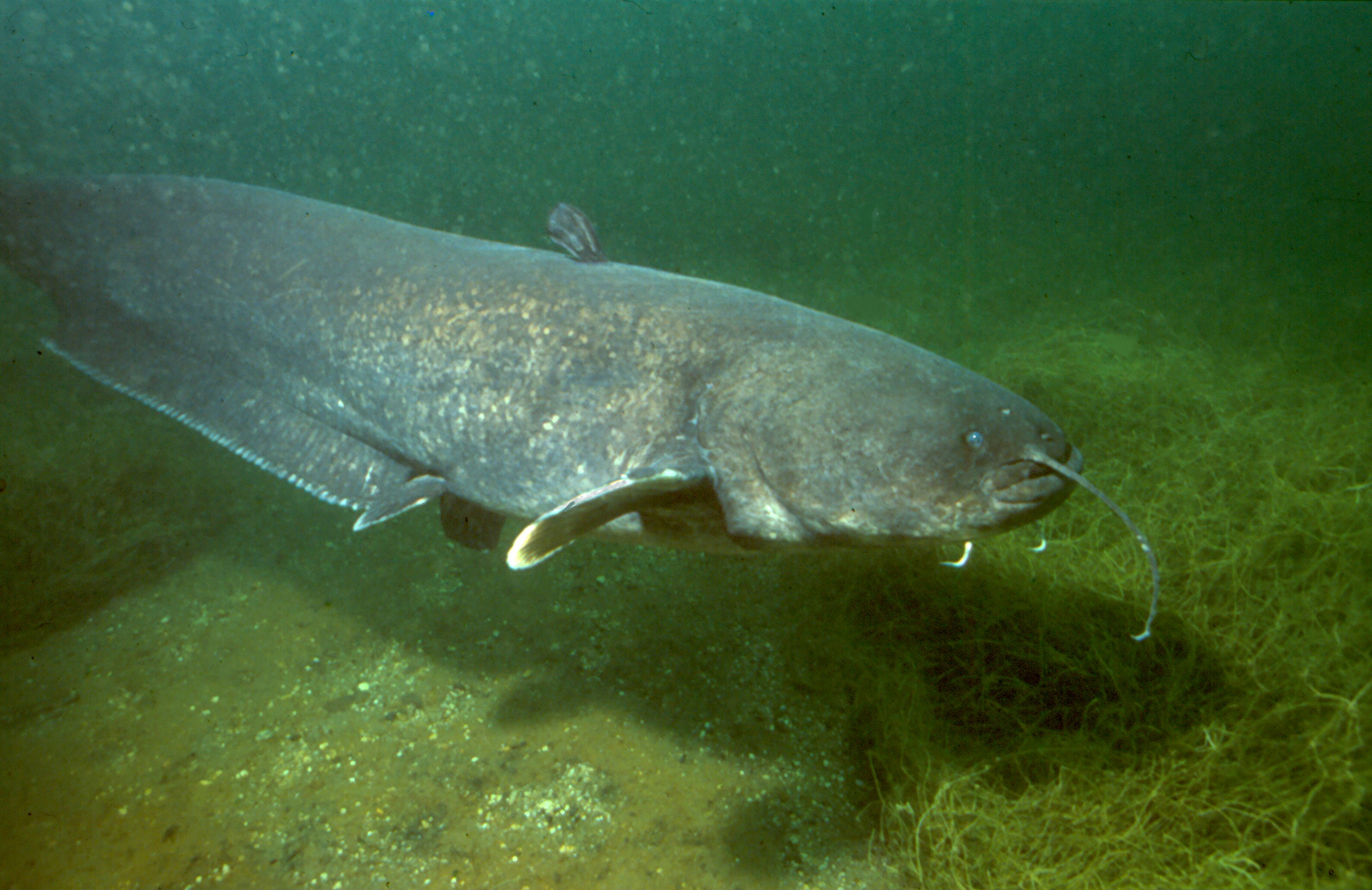
Wels catfish

Family Siluridae (sheatfishes)

- Wels catfish (Silurus glanis)

Family Ictaluridae (North American catfishes)

- Black bullhead (Ameiurus melas) (I)
- Brown bullhead (Ameiurus nebulosus) (I)

== Order Esociformes (pikes and mudminnows) ==
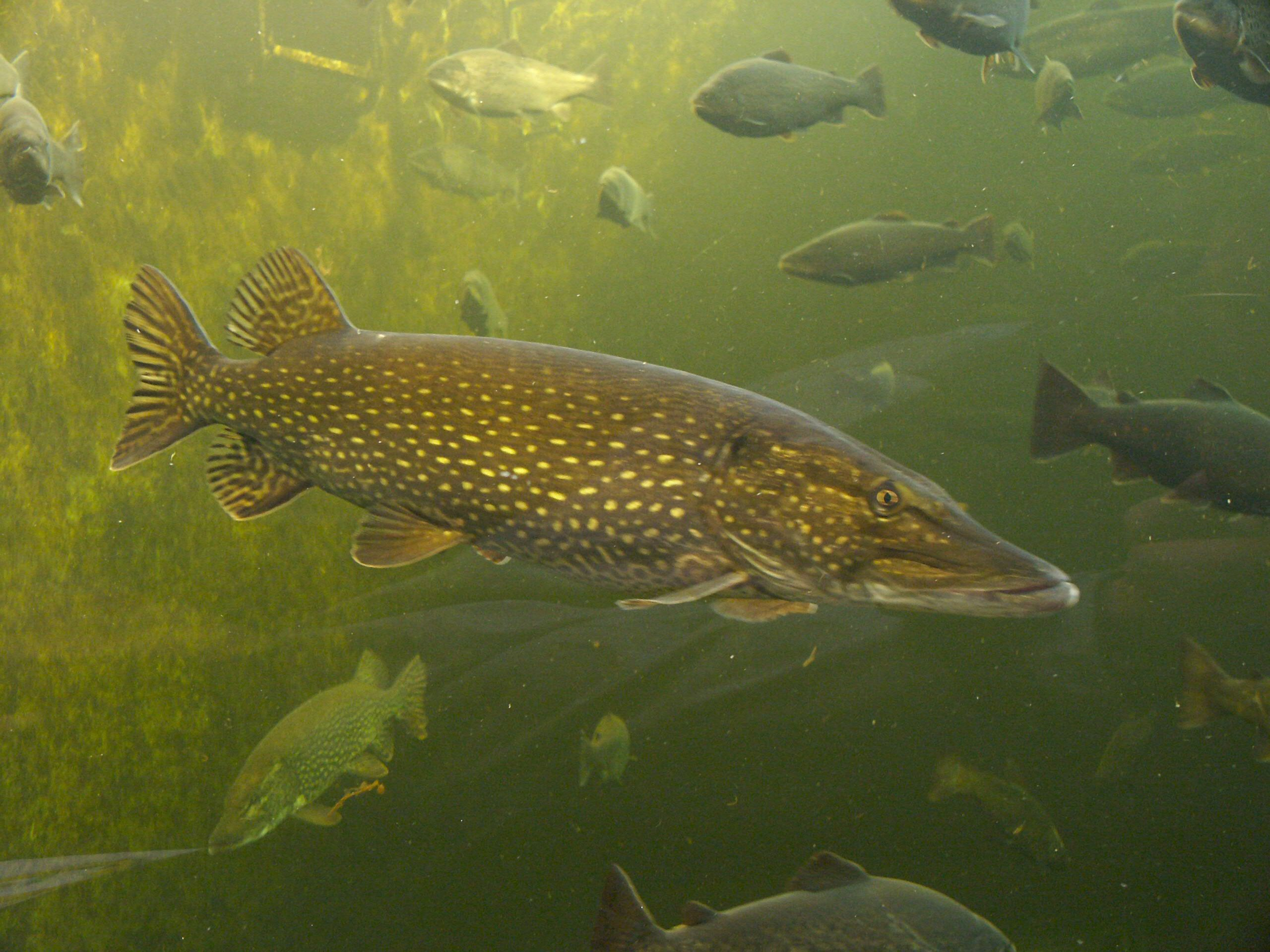
Northern Pike

Family Esocidae (pikes)

- Northern pike (Esox lucius)

Family Umbridae (mudminnows)

- European mudminnow (Umbra krameri)

== Order Salmoniformes (salmons, trouts and whitefishes) ==
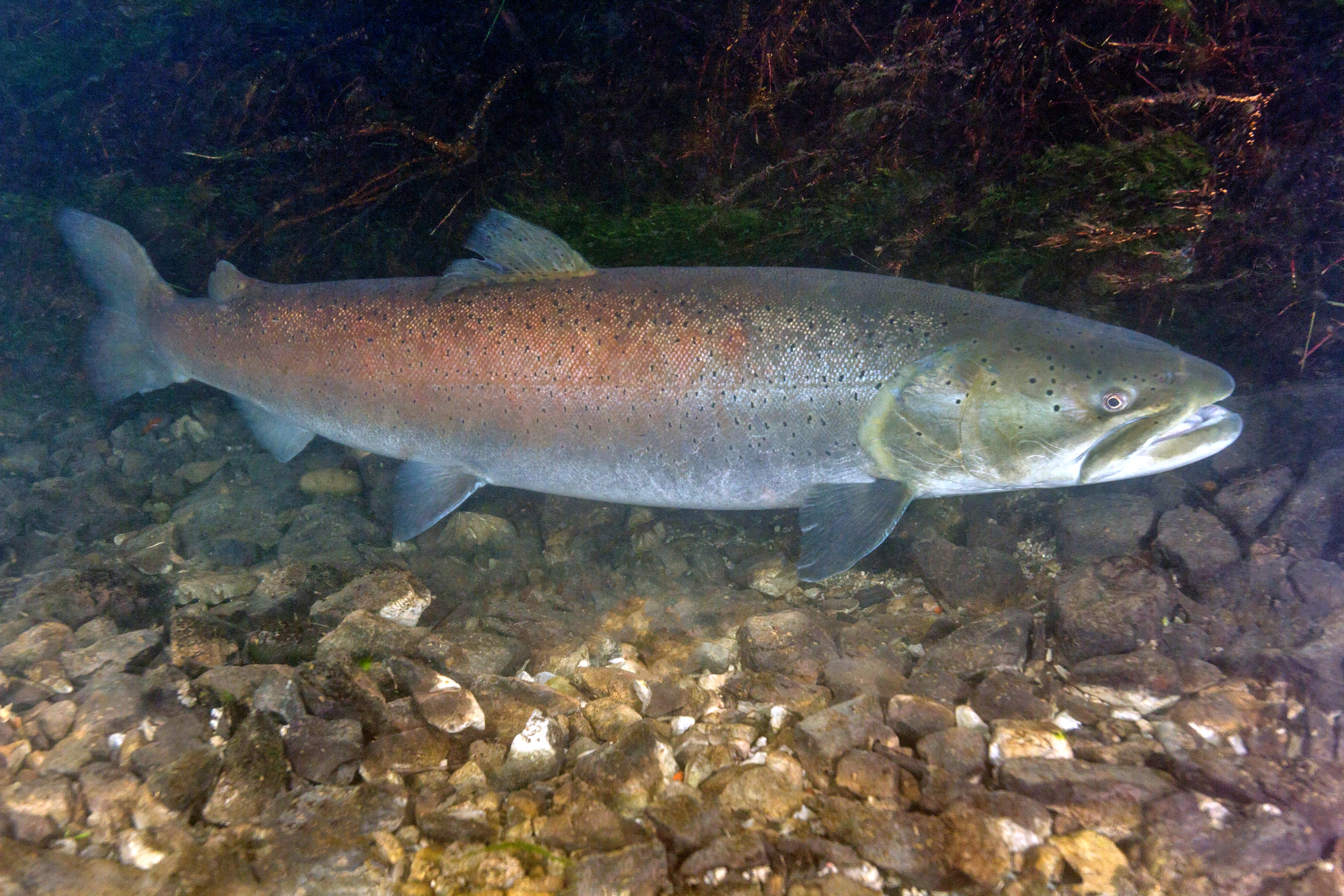
Huchen

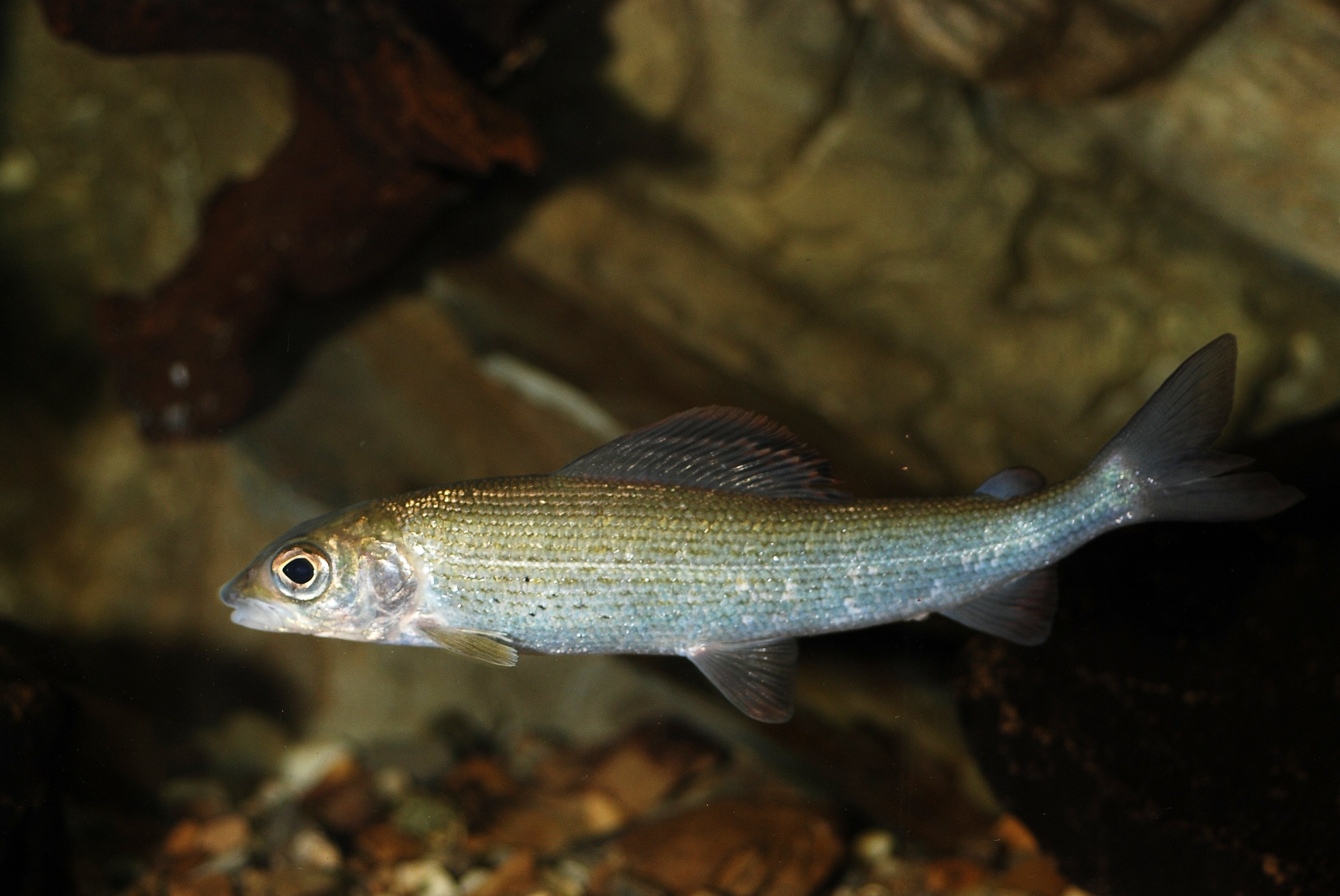
European grayling

Family Salmonidae (salmons, trouts and whitefishes)

- Coregonus arenicolus
- Reinanke (Coregonus atterensis) (En)
- Kröpfling (Coregonus austriacus) (En)
- Riedling (Coregonus danneri) (En)
- Lake Constance whitefish (Coregonus gutturosus) (E)
- Coregonus macrophthalmus
- Houting (Coregonus oxyrinchus)
- Peled (Coregonus peled)
- Coregonus renke
- Blaufelchen (Coregonus wartmanni)
- Huchen (Hucho hucho)
- Rainbow trout (Oncorhynchus mykiss) (I)
- Austrian Lakes trout (Salmo schiefermuelleri)
- Brook trout (Salvelinus fontinalis) (I)
- Lake trout (Salvelinus namaycush) (I)
- Lake Constance deepwater char (Salvelinus profundus)
- Lake char (Salvelinus umbla)
- European grayling (Thymallus thymallus)

== Order Gadiformes (cods) ==
Family Lotidae (hakes and burbots)

- Burbot (Lota lota)

== Order Gobiiformes (gobies and allies) ==
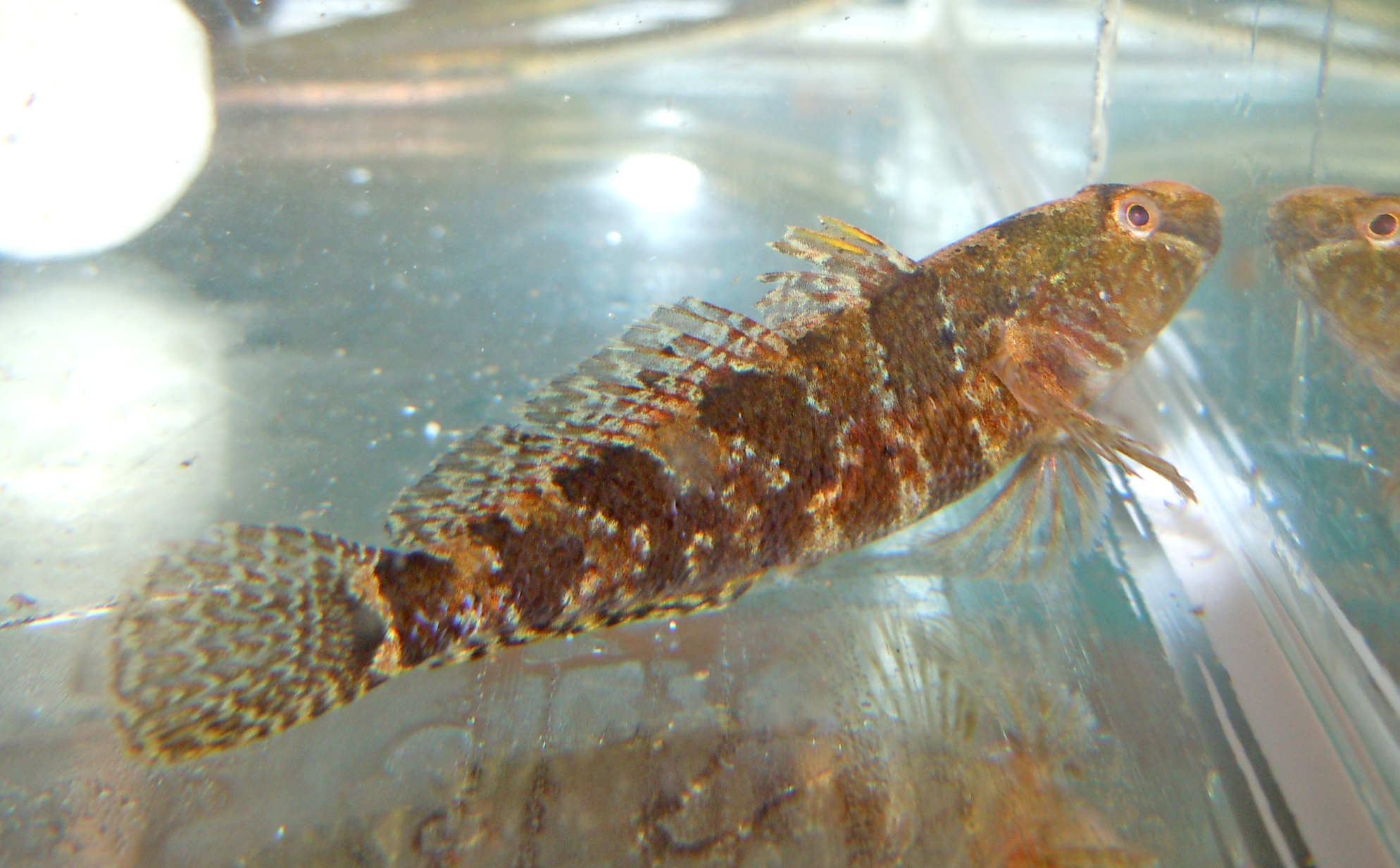
Tubenose goby

Family Gobiidae (gobies)

- Racer goby (Babka gymnotrachelus) (I)
- Round goby (Neogobius melanostomus) (I)
- Bighead goby (Ponticola kessleri) (I)
- Tubenose goby (Proterorhinus marmoratus)
- Western tubenose goby (Proterorhinus semilunaris) (I)

== Order Cichliformes (cichlids, damselfishes and allies) ==
Family Cichlidae (cichlids)

- Banded jewelfish (Hemichromis fasciatus) (I)
- Jewel cichlid (Rubricatochromis guttatus) (I)

== Order Centrarchiformes (freshwater sunfishes and allies) ==
Family Centrarchidae (freshwater sunfishes)

- Pumpkinseed (Lepomis gibbosus) (I)
- Smallmouth bass (Micropterus dolomieu) (I)
- Largemouth bass (Micropterus salmoides) (I)

== Order Perciformes (perch-like fishes) ==
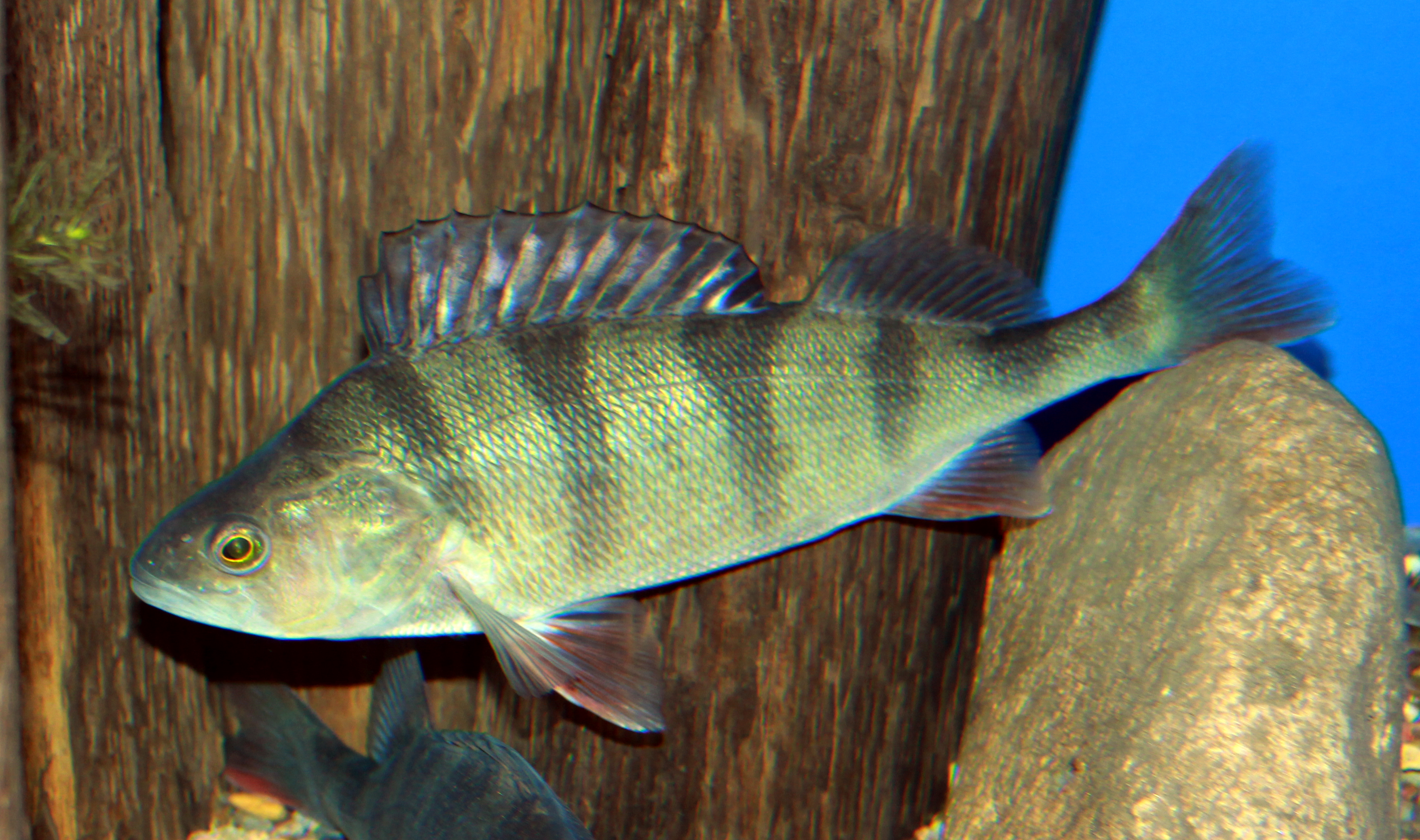
European perch

Family Percidae (perches, darters and allies)

- Balon's ruffe (Gymnocephalus baloni)
- Ruffe (Gymnocephalus cernua)
- Schraetzer (Gymnocephalus schraetser)
- European perch (Perca fluviatilis)
- Zander (Sander lucioperca)
- Volga pikeperch (Sander volgensis)
- Streber (Zingel streber)
- Zingel (Zingel zingel)

== Order Scorpaeniformes (sculpins and allies) ==
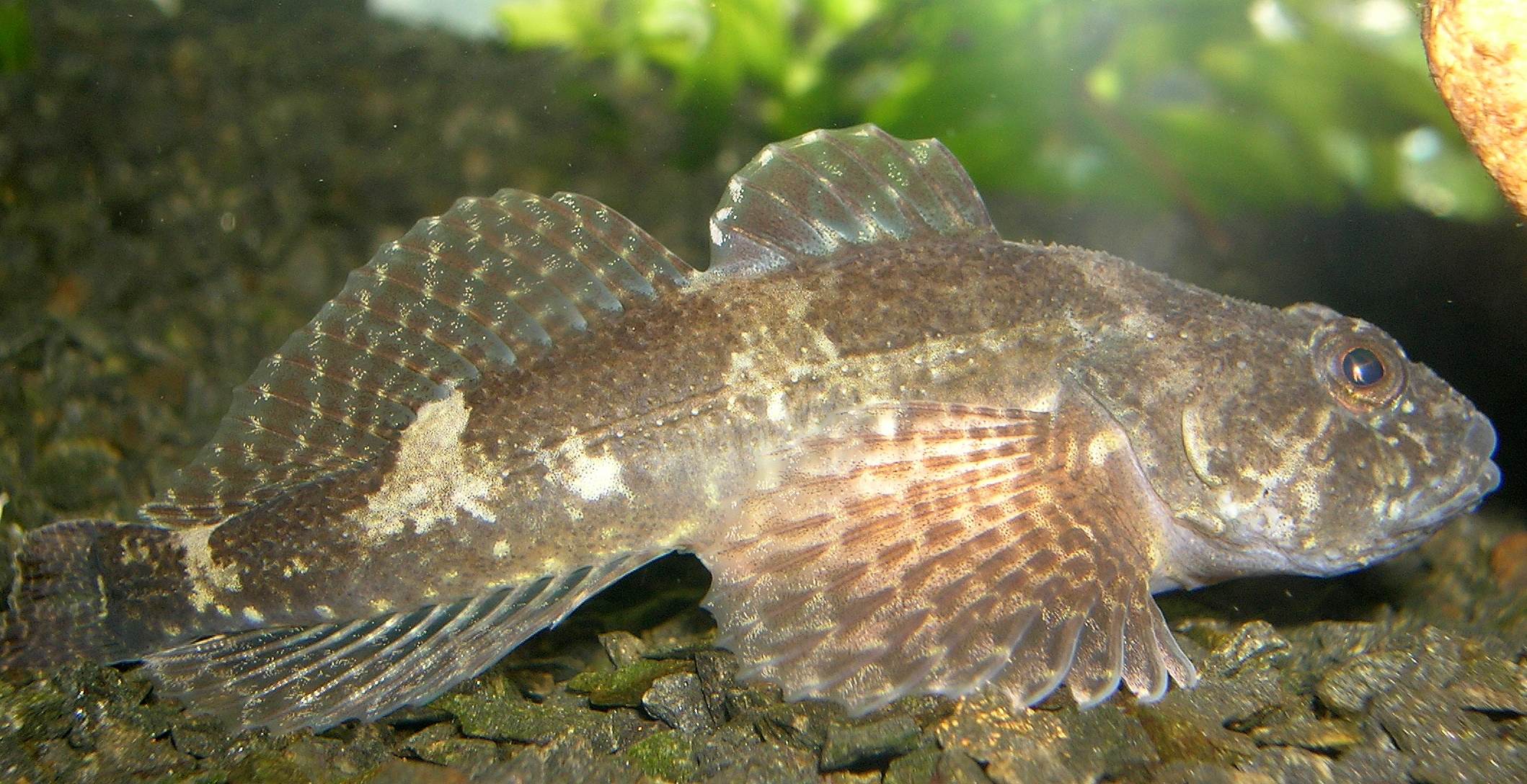
European bullhead

Family Gasterosteidae (sticklebacks)

- Three-spined stickleback (Gasterosteus aculeatus) (I)
- Ninespine stickleback (Pungitius pungitius) (I)

Family Cottidae (cottids)

- European bullhead (Cottus gobio)
