= European whitefish =

European whitefish can refer to several fish in the genus Coregonus:

- Coregonus lavaretus, also known as the common whitefish
- Coregonus macrophthalmus, from Lake Konstanz
- Coregonus maraena, from the Baltic region
