= Coregonus megalops =

Conservation status
- Least Concern (IUCN 3.1)

Scientific classification
- Domain: Eukaryota
- Kingdom: Animalia
- Phylum: Chordata
- Class: Actinopterygii
- Order: Salmoniformes
- Family: Salmonidae
- Genus: Coregonus
- Species: C. megalops

Binomial name
- Coregonus megalops Widegren, 1863

Synonyms
- Coregonus bolmeniensis Smitt, 1883

Species of fish

Coregonus megalops is a putative species of whitefish, part of the Coregonus lavaretus complex (European whitefish). Its distribution is in Sweden, Finland, and Russia.

In Sweden, the name C. megalops has referred to a form of whitefish known as the blåsik ("blue whitefish"). That is however no more considered a distinct species but a morphotype of Coregonus maraena ("Coregonus maraena morphotype megalops"), and not different from "Coregonus maraena morphotype nilssoni".
