= Kropfer =

Kropfer can refer to either of two species of fish from Switzerland in the genus Coregonus:

- Coregonus alpinus, from Lake Thun
- Coregonus restrictus, which is probably extinct
