= Coregonus nilssoni =

Scientific classification
- Kingdom: Animalia
- Phylum: Chordata
- Class: Actinopterygii
- Order: Salmoniformes
- Family: Salmonidae
- Genus: Coregonus
- Species: C. nilssoni

Binomial name
- Coregonus nilssoni Valenciennes, 1848

Species of fish

Coregonus nilssoni is a putative species of whitefish, part of the Coregonus lavaretus complex (European whitefish). It is a pelagic fish feeding on zooplankton. Its distribution is in lakes of Sweden, southern Norway, Denmark and Poland.

In Sweden, the name C. nilssoni has referred to a form of whitefish known as the planktonsik. That is however no more considered a distinct species but an ecotype within Coregonus maraena ("Coregonus maraena morphotype nilssoni"), and not different from "Coregonus maraena morphotype megalops".
