= Coregonus baicalensis =

Scientific classification
- Kingdom: Animalia
- Phylum: Chordata
- Class: Actinopterygii
- Order: Salmoniformes
- Family: Salmonidae
- Genus: Coregonus
- Species: C. baicalensis

Binomial name
- Coregonus baicalensis Dybowski, 1874
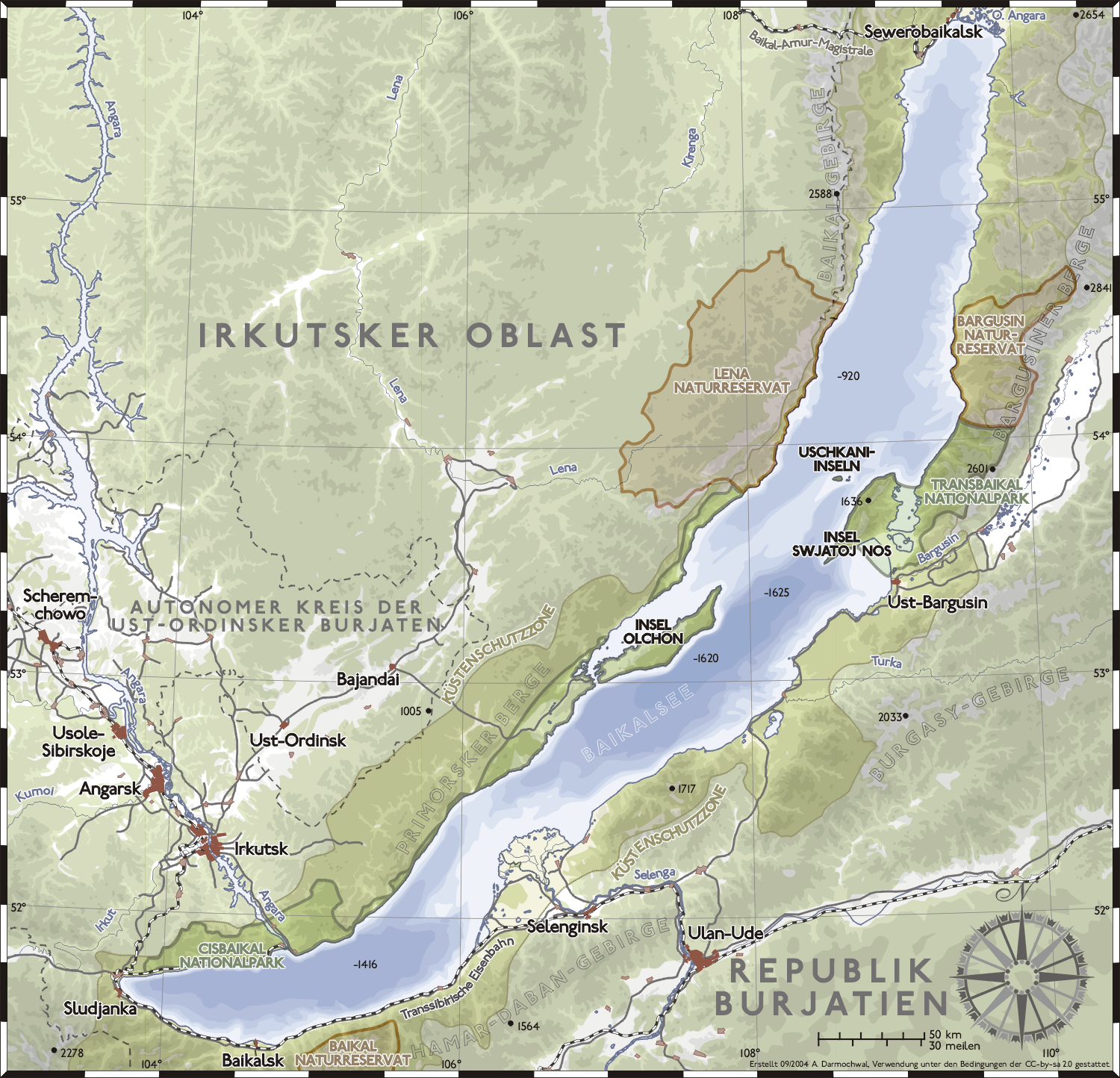
- Lake Baikal, the home of Coregonus baicalensis

Synonyms
- Coregonus lavaretus baicalensis Dybowski, 1874

Species of fish

Coregonus baicalensis is a species of freshwater whitefish in the family Salmonidae. It is endemic to the Russian Federation's Lake Baikal where it is found on the bottom demersal. The maximum length recorded for this species is 60 centimetres (24 in). The average length is a few centimetres above 50 centimetres (20 in). It is also known as the Baikal whitefish. It is frequently considered to be a subspecies of Coregonus lavaretus.
