= Coregonus pallasii =

Scientific classification
- Kingdom: Animalia
- Phylum: Chordata
- Class: Actinopterygii
- Order: Salmoniformes
- Family: Salmonidae
- Genus: Coregonus
- Species: C. pallasii

Binomial name
- Coregonus pallasii Valenciennes, 1848

Synonyms
- Coregonus aspius Smitt, 1883

Species of fish

Coregonus pallasii is a putative species of whitefish in the family Salmonidae, part of the Coregonus lavaretus complex (European whitefish).

It is a lacustrine fish, indicated to live in large lakes of Sweden, Finland and Karelia (Russia). A typical size is 42 cm and maximum size 60 cm.

In Sweden, the name C. pallasii has been used of a whitefish form known as aspsik in the large lakes of the northern river basins, including lakes Pakijaure, Hornävan, Storlaisan, Storuman, Vojmsjön and Storlögdan. Currently these populations are no more considered separate from the common whitefish, but as a morphotype within Coregonus maraena. Also in Finland, only one species of the C. lavaretus group is recognized, and C. lavaretus f. pallasi has been used to denote the zooplankton-feeding ecomorph "northern densely-rakered whitefish".
