= Beckius =

Beckius Temporal range: Early Oligocene

Scientific classification
- Kingdom: Animalia
- Phylum: Chordata
- Class: Actinopterygii
- Order: Salmoniformes
- Family: Salmonidae
- Subfamily: Coregoninae
- Genus: †Beckius; David, 1946
- Species: †B. plicatus

Binomial name
- †Beckius plicatus David, 1946

Fossil genus of fishes

Beckius is an extinct genus of marine whitefish known from the Early Oligocene of California. It contains a single species, B. plicatus, known only from a single fossilized scale from the Tumey Formation, a lens of the Kreyenhagen Shale. The scale was found to resemble those of Coregonus, although significantly different in many ways, leading to its classification as a new genus of Coregoninae.

The genus name was later reused in 1992 for a scarab beetle from New Guinea, until it was discovered to be preoccupied; the beetle was thus renamed Debeckius.
