= Coregonus zugensis =

Conservation status
- Extinct (IUCN 3.1)

Scientific classification
- Kingdom: Animalia
- Phylum: Chordata
- Class: Actinopterygii
- Order: Salmoniformes
- Family: Salmonidae
- Genus: Coregonus
- Species: †C. zugensis

Binomial name
- †Coregonus zugensis Nüsslin, 1882

Species of fish

Coregonus zugensis, also known as the Swiss whitefish, was a freshwater species of fish of the subfamily Coregoninae which was found in Europe lakes of Lucerne and Zug. However, in a recent study, it was found that the species had been extirpated from Lake Zug.

== Description ==
Coregonus zugensis is benthopelagic, living 20–80 meters (66–262 ft) underwater. It can reach a maximum recorded length of 20 centimetres (7.9 inches). It usually feeds on zooplankton and insect nymphs.
