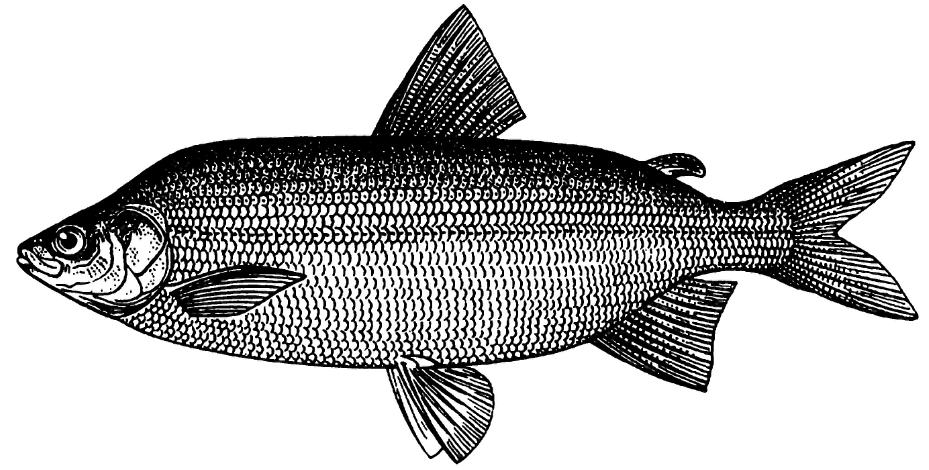

Scientific classification
- Kingdom: Animalia
- Phylum: Chordata
- Class: Actinopterygii
- Order: Salmoniformes
- Family: Salmonidae
- Genus: Coregonus
- Species: C. maraenoides

Binomial name
- Coregonus maraenoides Berg, 1916

Synonyms
- Coregonus lavaretus maraenoides Berg, 1916

= Peipsi whitefish =

Species of fish

The Peipsi whitefish (Coregonus maraenoides) is a freshwater whitefish of the family Salmonidae that naturally occurs in Lake Peipus on the border of Estonia and Russia, from where it also ascends to Lake Võrtsjärv to spawn. It has been introduced in Lake Burtnieks (Latvia), Gulf of Riga (Baltic Sea), many lakes of northern Russia, Poland, Germany, Netherlands, Japan, Lake Sevan (Armenia) and Balkash (Kazakhstan). It is a benthopelagic fish up to 60 cm long.

It is part of the European whitefish complex (Coregonus lavaretus sensu lato), and often not distinguished from C. lavaretus.
