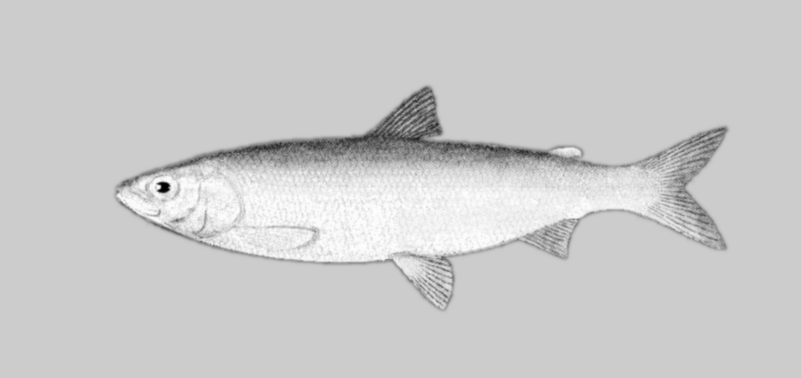

Conservation status
- Critically endangered, possibly extinct (IUCN 2.3)

Scientific classification
- Kingdom: Animalia
- Phylum: Chordata
- Class: Actinopterygii
- Order: Salmoniformes
- Family: Salmonidae
- Genus: Coregonus
- Species: C. reighardi

Binomial name
- Coregonus reighardi (Koelz, 1924)

= Shortnose cisco =

Species of fish

The shortnose cisco (Coregonus reighardi) is a North American freshwater whitefish in the salmon family Salmonidae. One of the members of the broader Coregonus artedi species complex of ciscoes, it is native to the Great Lakes of Canada and the United States. Its population has been declining and it has disappeared from some of its earlier haunts. The last reported population was restricted to Georgian Bay off Lake Huron in Canada. It is thought that declines in the population of this fish may be linked with the arrival of the sea lamprey (Petromyzon marinus), in the Great Lakes. The International Union for Conservation of Nature has rated the conservation status of this fish as "critically endangered", and possibly extinct.

In 2024, the United States Geological Survey announced that the species had been rediscovered in Lake Superior.

== Description ==
Reaching a maximum recorded length of 36 cm (14 in) and a maximum recorded weight of 540 g (1 lb 3 oz), the shortnose cisco is distinguished from the other whitefishes by its thicker body (nearly circular in cross-section), short head (the source of the fish's common name), and small eye.

== Ecology ==
Like many Coregonus species, the shortnose cisco is poorly understood, and little is known about its breeding or life-cycle except that it spawns in the spring at the lake bottom; the oldest specimen collected was eight years of age. The fish feeds on crustaceans, molluscs, and zooplankton.

== Status ==
It is native to the Great Lakes, formerly occurring in Lakes Huron, Michigan, and Ontario in Canada and the United States. The IUCN considers C. reighardi to be Critically Endangered on the basis of plummeting population, caused by environmental degradation. The U.S. Fish and Wildlife Service and the Province of Ontario's Ministry of Natural Resources, however, consider the species already extinct, on the basis that no specimen has been collected since 1985. The species was last confirmed present in Lake Ontario in 1964, in Lake Michigan in 1974, and in Georgian Bay in 1985. Predation by the alien sea lamprey (Petromyzon marinus), in combination with commercial overfishing, has contributed to the fish's drastic reduction in numbers and possible extirpation. In 2024, it was announced that the species had been rediscovered in Lake Superior, where it is not previously known to have lived.
