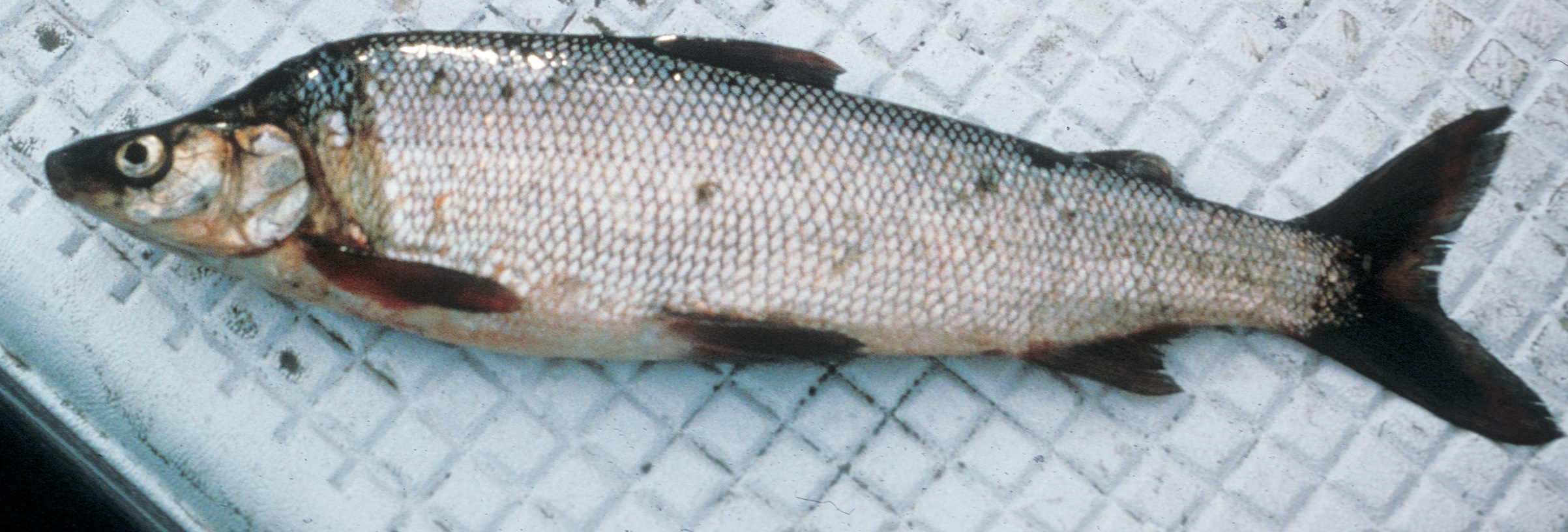

Conservation status
- Least Concern (IUCN 3.1)

Scientific classification
- Kingdom: Animalia
- Phylum: Chordata
- Class: Actinopterygii
- Order: Salmoniformes
- Family: Salmonidae
- Genus: Coregonus
- Species: C. pidschian

Binomial name
- Coregonus pidschian J. F. Gmelin, 1789

= Humpback whitefish =

Species of fish

The humpback whitefish (Coregonus pidschian), also referred to as the bottom whitefish, the Arctic whitefish or the pidschian, is a species of freshwater whitefish with a northern distribution. It is one of the members in the broader common whitefish complex, or the Coregonus clupeaformis complex. This fish lives in estuaries and brackish water near river mouths, in deltas and in slowly running rivers, in large lakes with tributaries, and floodplain lakes. It can migrate long distances upriver for spawning.

The distribution of Coregonus pidschian is in the Arctic basin, ranging from Northern Norway and Finland across the Russian coast to Alaska and up to the Mackenzie River drainage in North-West Canada. It is also found in the Okhotsk Sea basin.
