= Coregonus acrinasus =

Conservation status
- Vulnerable (IUCN 3.1)

Scientific classification
- Kingdom: Animalia
- Phylum: Chordata
- Class: Actinopterygii
- Order: Salmoniformes
- Family: Salmonidae
- Genus: Coregonus
- Species: C. acrinasus

Binomial name
- Coregonus acrinasus Selz, Dönz, Vonlanthen & Seehausen, 2020

Species of fish

Coregonus acrinasus, commonly known as the point-snouted whitefish, is a species of freshwater whitefish in the family Salmonidae. It is endemic to Lake Thun in Austria, and is listed as vunerable by the IUCN.
