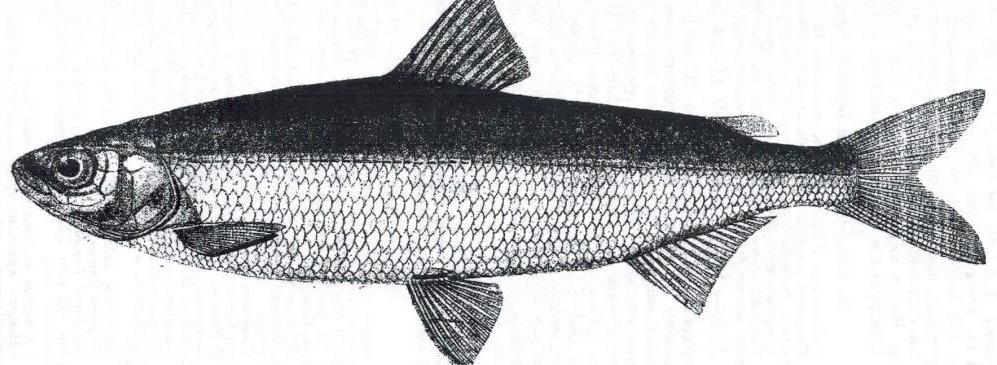

Scientific classification
- Kingdom: Animalia
- Phylum: Chordata
- Class: Actinopterygii
- Division: Teleostei
- Order: Salmoniformes
- Family: Salmonidae
- Genus: Coregonus
- Species: C. tugun

Binomial name
- Coregonus tugun (Pallas, 1814)

Synonyms
- Coregonus tugun lenensis Berg, 1932

= Coregonus tugun =

Species of fish

Coregonus tugun, the tugun, is a species freshwater whitefish from rivers draining to the Arctic Ocean. It is one of the several species of Siberian whitefishes, with a distribution encompassing rivers from the Ob in the west to the Yana River in the east. In the Lower Ob basin, it inhabits in all the Ural Mountains tributaries. It never enters the sea.

Tugun is a small fish, with a typical length of 11 centimetres (4.3 in) and weight 20–30 grams (0.7–1.1 oz), and a maximum length 20 centimetres (7.9 in) corresponding to 80 grams (2.8 oz). It has 54 to 76 lateral line scales, which fall off easily. It is distinguished from other Coregonus species by a lower body that has a roundish cross-section. The life cycle is fast: most fish mature already in the second year of life. Life span is up to 6 years. Tugun feeds on planktonic crustaceans and insect larvae. Tugun itself has been a valuable food fish, but the populations have strongly declined.

The Lena tugun of Lena River drainage has sometimes been distinguished as a distinct subspecies Coregonus tugun lenensis, but is not accepted in current taxonomy. Coregonus tugun is distantly related to all other whitefishes, and may have diverged both from the common whitefish complex and from the Eurasian and American ciscoes already ten million years ago.
