= Coregonus anaulorum =

Scientific classification
- Kingdom: Animalia
- Phylum: Chordata
- Class: Actinopterygii
- Order: Salmoniformes
- Family: Salmonidae
- Genus: Coregonus
- Species: C. anaulorum

Binomial name
- Coregonus anaulorum Chereshnev, 1996

Species of fish

Coregonus anaulorum is a species of freshwater whitefish in the family Salmonidae. It is found in the rivers and estuaries of Russia's Chukotka Autonomous Okrug and adjacent Koryakia of the Kamchatka Krai, especially the Anadyr River and its estuary, the Anadyrskiy Liman. It is a benthopelagic fish, and marine populations migrate to freshwater streams to breed.
