= Tugun =

Tugun may refer to:

- Tugun, Coregonus tugun, a species of freshwater whitefish
- Tugun, Queensland, a suburb in the City of Gold Coast, Queensland, Australia
- Tugun or Wetarese language, of East Timor
