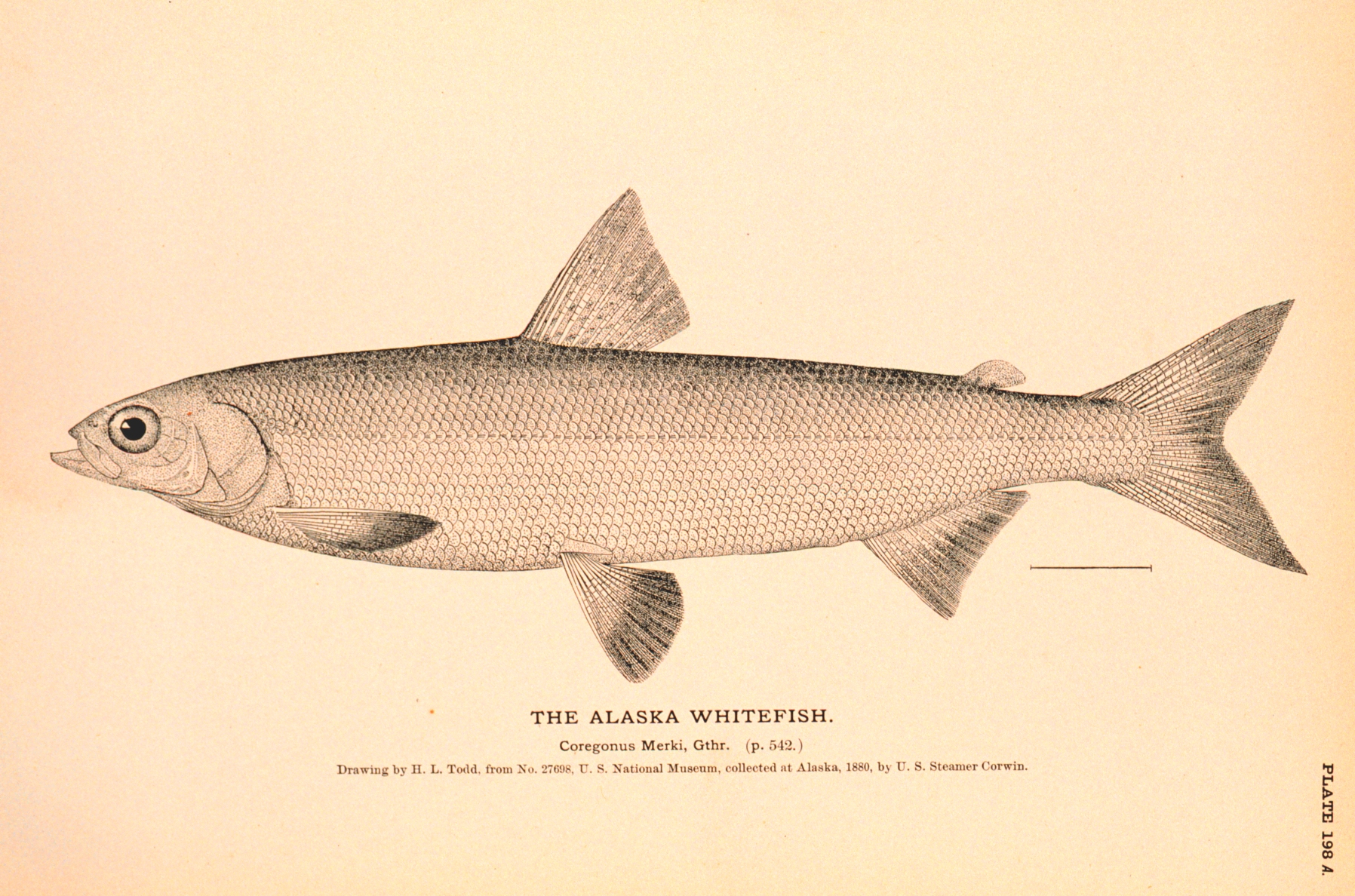

Scientific classification
- Kingdom: Animalia
- Phylum: Chordata
- Class: Actinopterygii
- Order: Salmoniformes
- Family: Salmonidae
- Genus: Coregonus
- Species: C. nelsonii

Binomial name
- Coregonus nelsonii T. H. Bean, 1884

= Alaska whitefish =

Species of fish

The Alaska whitefish (Coregonus nelsonii) is a species of whitefish in the family Salmonidae. It is found in parts of northwestern North America, where it occurs only in small and large rivers, and rarely in lakes. The maximum length recorded for this species is 56.0 cm (22.0 in).

The Alaska whitefish is part of the Coregonus clupeaformis complex (lake whitefishes).
