= Coregonus atterensis =

Conservation status
- Critically Endangered (IUCN 3.1)

Scientific classification
- Kingdom: Animalia
- Phylum: Chordata
- Class: Actinopterygii
- Order: Salmoniformes
- Family: Salmonidae
- Genus: Coregonus
- Species: C. atterensis

Binomial name
- Coregonus atterensis Kottelat, 1997

Species of fish

Coregonus atterensis, known as the Atter whitefish, is a species of freshwater whitefish in the family Salmonidae. It is endemic to Lake Atter in Austria, and is listed as critically endangered by the IUCN.
