= Coregonus austriacus =

Conservation status
- Critically Endangered (IUCN 3.1)

Scientific classification
- Kingdom: Animalia
- Phylum: Chordata
- Class: Actinopterygii
- Division: Teleostei
- Order: Salmoniformes
- Family: Salmonidae
- Genus: Coregonus
- Species: C. austriacus

Binomial name
- Coregonus austriacus C. C. Vogt, 1909

Species of fish

Coregonus austriacus, known as the Austrian whitefish, is a species of freshwater whitefish in the family Salmonidae. It is endemic to Lake Atter in Austria, and is listed as critically endangered by the IUCN.
