= Coregonus bezola =

Conservation status
- Extinct (IUCN 3.1)

Scientific classification
- Kingdom: Animalia
- Phylum: Chordata
- Class: Actinopterygii
- Order: Salmoniformes
- Family: Salmonidae
- Genus: Coregonus
- Species: †C. bezola

Binomial name
- †Coregonus bezola Fatio, 1888

Extinct species of fish

Coregonus bezola is an extinct species of freshwater whitefish in the family Salmonidae. It was endemic to the Lac du Bourget in Savoie, France where it was pelagic in deep water. The maximum length recorded for this species is 32.0 centimetres (12.6 in). It is known from specimens collected in the late 19th century, and was reported by fishermen to have disappeared in the 1960s. It spawned in January and February, on the muddy bottom of the lake, at a depth of 70 to 80 metres (230–260 ft).
