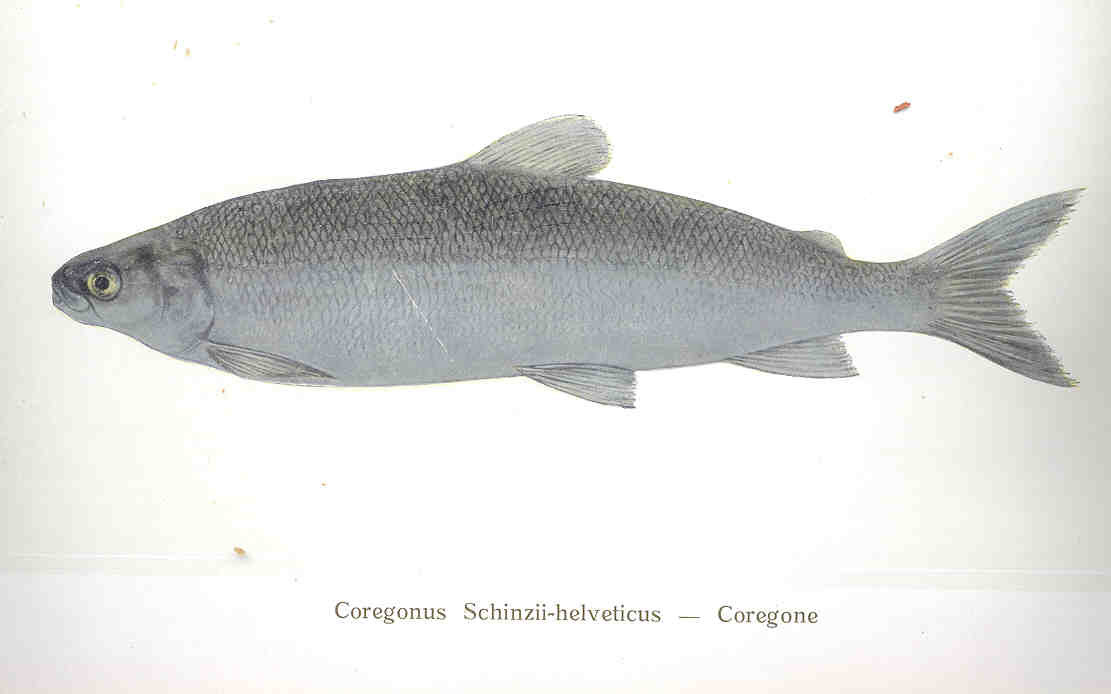

Conservation status
- Least Concern (IUCN 3.1)

Scientific classification
- Kingdom: Animalia
- Phylum: Chordata
- Class: Actinopterygii
- Order: Salmoniformes
- Family: Salmonidae
- Genus: Coregonus
- Species: C. alpinus

Binomial name
- Coregonus alpinus Fatio, 1885

= Coregonus alpinus =

Species of fish

Coregonus alpinus is a species of freshwater whitefish in the family Salmonidae. It is endemic to Lake Thun, in Switzerland's Interlaken region, where it is found in deep water. The maximum length recorded for this species is 25 centimetres (9.8 in). It feeds on chironomids and other bottom-dwelling invertebrates. It is known as the kropfer, a name also applied to the probably extinct species Coregonus restrictus.
