= Coregonus candidus =

Conservation status
- Vulnerable (IUCN 3.1)

Scientific classification
- Kingdom: Animalia
- Phylum: Chordata
- Class: Actinopterygii
- Division: Teleostei
- Order: Salmoniformes
- Family: Salmonidae
- Genus: Coregonus
- Species: C. candidus

Binomial name
- Coregonus candidus Goll, 1883

Species of fish

Coregonus candidus, locally known as shiny whitefish, is a freshwater species of fish of the genus coregonus, which is also known as whitefish, found in the Lake Neuchâtel and Bienne of Switzerland. The fish is classified as vulnerable according to the IUCN standard due to overfishing and improper management of the water body.

== Description ==
The maximum recorded length of the fish can reach up to 32 cm (13 in). It lives at or near the bottom of the water, up to 90–130 m (300–430 ft). The species spawn in January on sandy or muddy lakebed.
