= Coregonus lutokka =

Conservation status
- Least Concern (IUCN 3.1)

Scientific classification
- Kingdom: Animalia
- Phylum: Chordata
- Class: Actinopterygii
- Order: Salmoniformes
- Family: Salmonidae
- Genus: Coregonus
- Species: C. lutokka

Binomial name
- Coregonus lutokka Kottelat, Bogutskaya, & Freyhof, 2005

Synonyms
- Coregonus widegreni ludoga Berg, 1916

Species of fish

Coregonus lutokka is a putative species of whitefish in the genus Coregonus. It is native to Lake Onega and Lake Ladoga in Karelia, but it has been introduced to many other water bodies in Russia. It eats benthic larvae, molluscs and crustaceans, but in the summer it usually switches to feed on zooplankton.

It was originally described in 1916 by Lev Berg as Coregonus widegreni ludoga.
