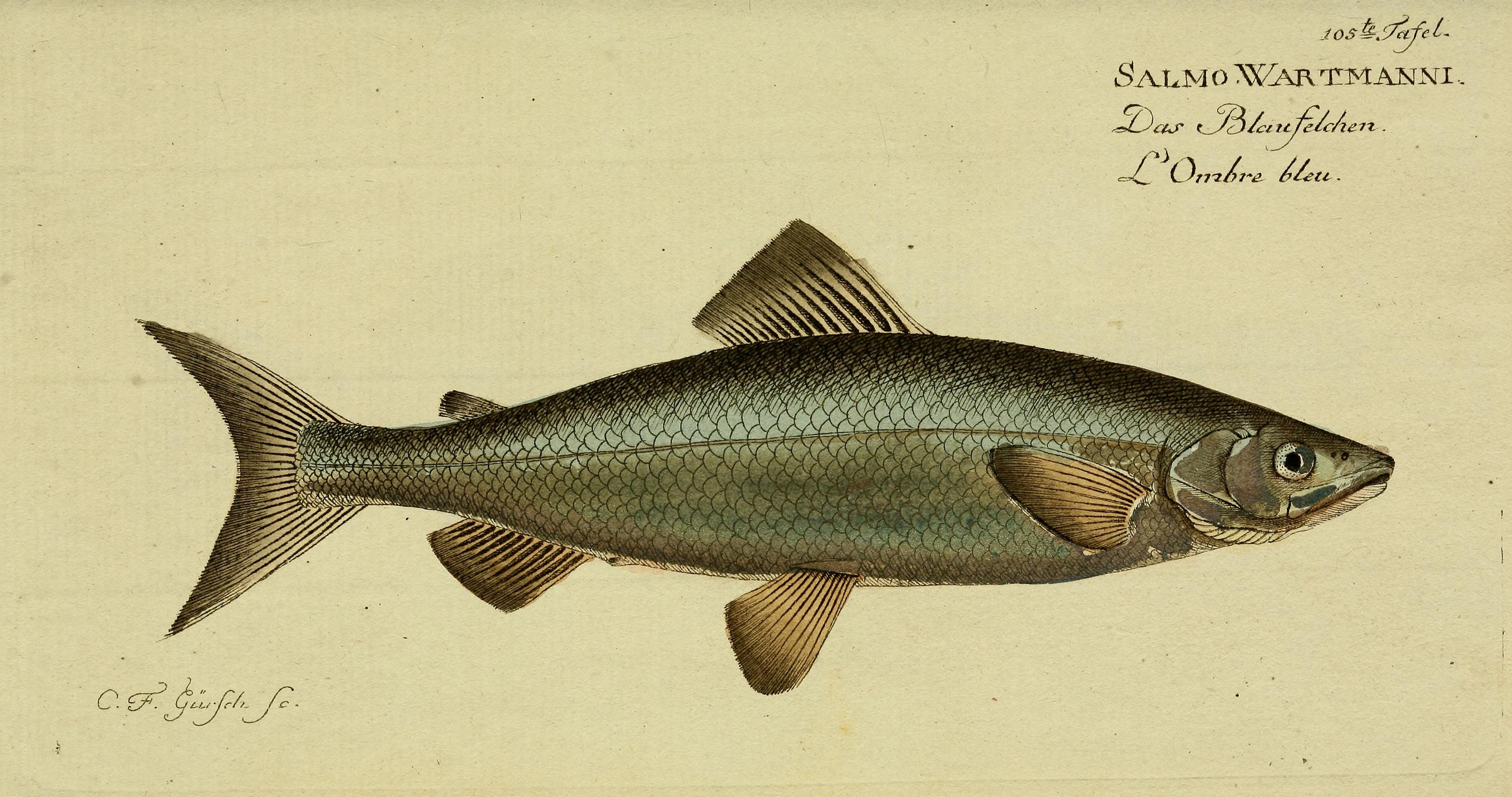

Conservation status
- Least Concern (IUCN 3.1)

Scientific classification
- Kingdom: Animalia
- Phylum: Chordata
- Class: Actinopterygii
- Order: Salmoniformes
- Family: Salmonidae
- Genus: Coregonus
- Species: C. wartmanni

Binomial name
- Coregonus wartmanni (Bloch, 1784)

= Coregonus wartmanni =

Species of fish

Coregonus wartmanni is a freshwater fish of the family Salmonidae found in Lake Constance (Austria, Germany and Switzerland).
