= Coregonus arenicolus =

Conservation status
- Vulnerable (IUCN 3.1)

Scientific classification
- Domain: Eukaryota
- Kingdom: Animalia
- Phylum: Chordata
- Class: Actinopterygii
- Order: Salmoniformes
- Family: Salmonidae
- Genus: Coregonus
- Species: C. arenicolus

Binomial name
- Coregonus arenicolus Kottelat, 1997

Species of fish

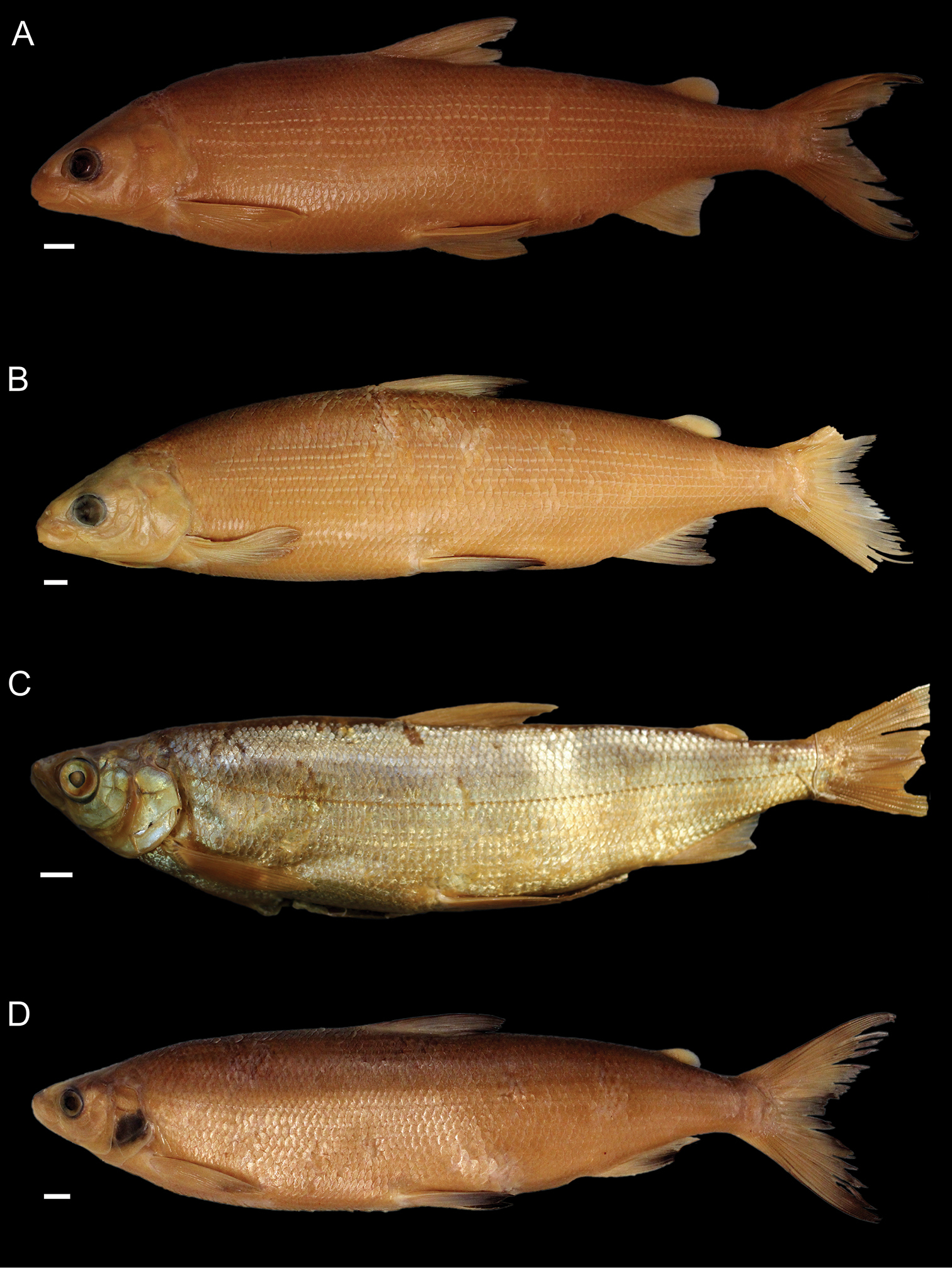
Four species of coregonus in Switzerland

Coregonus arenicolus is a freshwater fish of the family Salmonidae found in Lake Constance (Switzerland, Germany and Austria).
