= Otto Nüsslin =

German zoologist and forester

Otto Nüsslin (26 October 1850, Karlsruhe – 2 January 1915, Baden-Baden) was a German zoologist and forester.

After completing his studies, he joined the staff of Bernard Altum (1824–1900) and Robert Hartig (1839–1901) at the Forestry Academy in Eberswalde. In 1880 Nüsslin founded the Lehrstuhl für Zoologie und Forstzoologie (Department of Zoology and Forest Zoology) at the Karlsruhe Institute of Technology, where he served as a professor until 1914.

He is known for his research of zoological species that have a negative impact on forests, such as the bark beetle. In the field of ichthyology, he is credited with providing scientific descriptions of three coregonid species found in Swiss lakes.

Several species bear his name, such as: Henneguya nuesslini, Adelges nuesslini, Bursaphelenchus nuesslini and Kissophagus nuesslini.

== Publications ==
- Zur Kritik des Amphioxauges. Inaugural dissertation, 1877 – Critique on amphioxus.
- Beiträge zur Anatomie und Physiologie der Pulmonaten, 1879 – Contributions to the anatomy and physiology of Pulmonata.
- Über normale Schwärmzeiten und über Generationsdauer der Borkenkäfer, 1882 – On normal "swarm times" and "generation times" of the bark beetle.
- Über einige neue Urthiere aus dem Herrenwieser See im badischen Schwarzwalde, (1884).
- Die Schweizer Coregonenspecies: Erurderung auf eine Dr. V. Fatios "Deux mots à propos Coregonus macrophthalmus de Nüsslin", 1903 – Swiss Coregonus species, A reply to Dr. Victor Fatio.
- Leitfaden der Forstinsektenkunde, 1905 – Guide to forest entomology.
- Neuere ergebnisse der chermes-forschung, (1910).
- Die Larven der Gattung Coregonus, ihre Beziehungen zur Biologie, und ihre systematische Bedeutung, 1908 – The larvae of the genus Coregonus, their relationship to biology, and their systematic significance.
