= Coregonus macrophthalmus =

Conservation status
- Least Concern (IUCN 3.1)

Scientific classification
- Kingdom: Animalia
- Phylum: Chordata
- Class: Actinopterygii
- Order: Salmoniformes
- Family: Salmonidae
- Genus: Coregonus
- Species: C. macrophthalmus

Binomial name
- Coregonus macrophthalmus Nüsslin, 1882

Species of fish

Coregonus macrophthalmus is a freshwater fish of the family Salmonidae. It can be found in Lake Constance (Austria, Germany and Switzerland).
