= Kreyenhagen Shale =

Geologic formation in California, United States

- Stratigraphic range: Paleogene
- Type: Formation

Location
- Region: California
- Country: United States

The Kreyenhagen Shale is a geologic formation in California. It preserves fossils dating back to the Paleogene period.

== See also ==
- List of fossiliferous stratigraphic units in California
- Paleontology in California
