= Walter Koelz =

American zoologist and museum collector

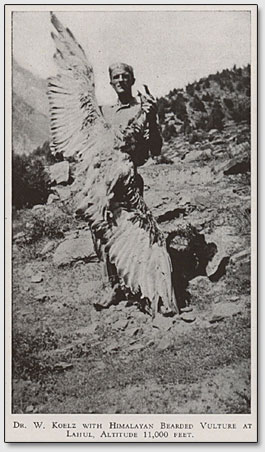

Walter Norman Koelz (September 11, 1895 – September 24, 1989) was an American zoologist and museum collector.

Walter Koelz's parents were immigrants from the Black Forest region of Germany, and his father was a village blacksmith in Waterloo, where Walter was born. Walter Koelz studied zoology and received the degree of Doctor of Philosophy from the University of Michigan in 1920. In 1925 he joined the McMillan Expedition to the American Arctic. He also studied whitefishes during his work at the University of Michigan at the Institute for Fisheries Research. He was offered a post with the Himalayan Research Institute of the Roerich Museum in 1930. He visited Naggar in Kulu, in May 1930, to begin botanical explorations. While collecting he met Thakur Rup Chand who joined him in his efforts. Koelz would work with Chand for over thirty years. Koelz returned to Michigan in 1932, but his interest in Tibetan culture led to his appointment as a Research Fellow on the Charles L. Freer Fund in September 1932.

In 1933 he returned to Indian Tibet to collect anthropology related material for the University of Michigan. In 1936 Dr. Koelz travelled once more to India to collect plants. For seven years from 1939 he explored Persia, Nepal, and parts of India including Assam and made a large collection of birds. In 1956 he was awarded the Meyer Memorial Award for outstanding contributions to the world of Agriculture. He found and brought back a disease-resistant wild melon from Calcutta that helped save the California melon crop one year. He had collected nearly 30,000 bird specimens for the University of Michigan's zoology museum and some 30,000 plants for the U. of M. herbarium.

Koelz often described new subspecies often on the sole basis of assuming that the population was isolated. Many of the subspecies of birds that he described from India are now invalid. Of the fish Coregonus artedi which is found in lakes and consists of isolated populations he described no less than 24 subspecies.

== Publications ==
- Koelz, W (1942). "Notes on the birds of the Londa neighbourhood, Bombay Presidency". J. Bombay Nat. Hist. Soc. 43 (1): 11–38.
- Koelz, W (1947). "Notes on a collection of birds from Madras Presidency". J. Bombay Nat. Hist. Soc. 47 (1): 128–142.
- Koelz, W (1937). "Notes on the birds of Spiti, a Himalayan province of the Punjab". Ibis. 14. 79 (1): 86–104. doi:10.1111/j.1474-919x.1937.tb02164.x.
- Koelz, W (1939). "Additions to the avifaunal list of Lahul". Ibis. 14. 3 (2): 354–356. doi:10.1111/j.1474-919x.1939.tb03986.x.
- Koelz, W (1939). "Three new subspecies of birds". Proc. Biol. Soc. Washington. 52: 121–122.
- Koelz, W (1939). "New birds from Asia, chiefly from India". Proc. Biol. Soc. Washington. 52: 61–82.
- Koelz, W (1940). "Notes on the birds of Zanskar and Purig, with appendices giving new records for Ladakh, Rupshu, and Kulu". Papers Michigan Acad. Sci. Arts Letters. 25: 297–322.
- Koelz, W (1949). "A new hawk from India". Auk. 66 (1): 82–83. doi:10.2307/4080678. JSTOR 4080678.
- Koelz, W (1950). "New subspecies of birds from southwestern Asia". Am. Mus. Novit. 1452: 1–10.
- Koelz, W (1951). "Four new subspecies of birds from southwestern Asia". Am. Mus. Novit. 1510: 1–3.
- Koelz, W (1951). "New birds from India". J. Zool. Soc. India. 3 (1): 27–30.
- Koelz, W (1952). "New races of Indian birds". J. Zool. Soc. India. 4 (1): 37–46.
- Koelz, W (1952). "New races of Assam birds". J. Zool. Soc. India. 4 (2): 153–155.
- Koelz, W (1954). "Ornithological studies I. New birds from Iran, Afghanistan, and India". Contrib. Instit. Regional Explorations. 1: 1–32.
- Koelz, W (1954). "Ornithological studies III. On the validity of Galerida malabarica propinqua Koelz". Contrib. Instit. Regional Explorations. 1: 33.
- van Tyne, J; Koelz, W (1936). "Seven new birds from the Punjab" (PDF). Occ. Pap. Mus. Zool. U. Michigan. 334: 1–6.
- Koelz, W (1940). "Notes on the winter birds of the lower Punjab". Papers Michigan Acad. Sci. Arts Letters. 25: 323–356.
