= Coregonus restrictus =

Conservation status
- Extinct (IUCN 3.1)

Scientific classification
- Kingdom: Animalia
- Phylum: Chordata
- Class: Actinopterygii
- Order: Salmoniformes
- Family: Salmonidae
- Genus: Coregonus
- Species: †C. restrictus

Binomial name
- †Coregonus restrictus Fatio, 1885

Extinct species of fish

Coregonus restrictus is an extinct freshwater fish from the family Salmonidae. It was originally discovered in Lake Morat, Switzerland, in 1885. In 2008 it was included on the IUCN Red List by J. Freyhof and M. Kottelat. It was first described by Fatio.
