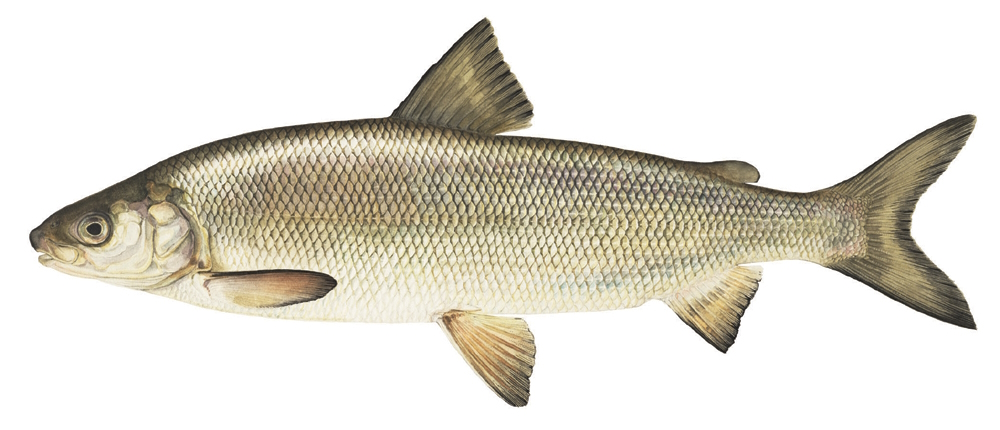
- Lake whitefish, Coregonus clupeaformis

Scientific classification
- Kingdom: Animalia
- Phylum: Chordata
- Class: Actinopterygii
- Division: Teleostei
- Order: Salmoniformes
- Family: Salmonidae
- Subfamily: Coregoninae
- Genus: Coregonus; Linnaeus, 1758

Type species
- Coregonus lavaretus Linnaeus, 1758

Species
- Nearly 70 extant members

= Coregonus =

Genus of fishes

Coregonus is a diverse genus of fish in the salmon family (Salmonidae). The Coregonus species are known as whitefishes. The genus contains at least 68 described extant taxa, but the true number of species is a matter of debate. The type species of the genus is Coregonus lavaretus.

Most Coregonus species inhabit lakes and rivers, and several species, including the Arctic cisco (C. autumnalis), the Bering cisco (C. laurettae), and the least cisco (C. sardinella) are anadromous, moving between salt water and fresh water.

Many whitefish species or ecotypes, especially from the Great Lakes and the Alpine lakes of Europe, have gone extinct over the past century or are endangered. Among 12 freshwater fish considered extinct in Europe, 6 are Coregonus. All Coregonus species are protected under appendix III of the Bern Convention, and Annex IV of the EC Habitats Directive (92/43/EEC)

== Taxonomy ==
Phylogenetic evidence indicates that the most basal member of the genus is the highly endangered Atlantic whitefish (C. huntsmani), which is endemic to a single river basin in Nova Scotia, Canada. The Atlantic whitefish is thought to have diverged from the rest of the genus during the mid-Miocene, about 15 million years ago.

The genus was previously subdivided into two subgenera Coregonus ("true whitefishes") and Leucichthys ("ciscoes"), Coregonus comprising taxa with sub-terminal mouth and usually a benthic feeding habit, Leucichthys those with terminal or supra-terminal mouth and usually a pelagic plankton-feeding habit. This classification is not natural however: based on molecular data, ciscoes comprise two distinct lineages within the genus. Moreover, the genus Stenodus is not phylogenetically distinct from Coregonus; although Stenodus occupies a basal position within the genus, phylogenetic evidence indicates that C. huntsmani is even more basal than it.

The scientific name given to this genus of fish comes from the Greek κόρη (kórē) "daughter; eye pupil" and γωνία (gōnía) "angle", because their pupil makes an angle, even though they share this feature with a large number of other fish.

=== Species diversity ===
There is much uncertainty and confusion in the classification of the many species of this genus. Particularly, one extreme view of diversity recognises just two main species in Northern and Central Europe, the common whitefish C. lavaretus and the vendace C. albula, whereas others would divide these into numerous, often narrowly distributed species. A drastic increase in number of recognized species occurred in 2007, when a review advocated that more than 50 local European populations should be considered as distinct based on morphological differences. It has been estimated that several of them are very young, having separated from each other less than 15,000 years ago. Many of these were primarily defined based on number of gill rakers. Although this largely is hereditary, the number is highly variable (even within single populations and species), can change relatively fast in response to changes and genetic studies have shown that they often are of limited use in predicting relationships among populations (a large difference in gill raker number does not necessarily equal a distant relationship). Genetic differences between several of the recently proposed species, even ones that are relatively distinct morphologically, are very limited and sometimes they are not monophyletic. Various Coregonus, whether regarded as separate species or not, readily interbreed with each other. A review of whitefish in the United Kingdom found that the identification key provided in 2007 did not match most individuals and that solid evidence for more than one species in that region is lacking.

Many European lakes have more than one Coregonus morph differing in ecology and morphology (especially gill rakers). Such morphs are sometimes partially reproductively isolated from each other, leading to suggestions of recognizing them as separate but clinal species. The morphs or clinal species may rapidly disappear (in 15 years or less, equalling three Coregonus generations) by merging into a single in response to changes in the habitat. A similar pattern can be seen in North America where the ciscoes of the Coregonus artedi complex in the Great Lakes and elsewhere comprise several, often co-occurring morphs or ecotypes, whose taxonomic status remains controversial.

=== Species ===
In 2017, FishBase listed 78 species, including the more than 50 proposed for Europe in 2007. Some of these are recently extinct (marked with a dagger, "†") and C. reighardi is likely extinct.

- Coregonus acrinasus Oliver M. Selz, Carmela J. Dönz, Pascal Vonlanthen, Ole Seehausen, 2020
- Coregonus albellus Fatio, 1890 (autumn brienzlig)
- Coregonus albula Linnaeus, 1758 (vendace)
- †Coregonus alpenae (Koelz, 1924) (longjaw cisco)
- Coregonus alpinus Fatio, 1885 (kropfer)
- Coregonus anaulorum Chereshnev, 1996
- Coregonus arenicolus Kottelat, 1997
- Coregonus artedi Lesueur, 1818 (northern cisco or lake herring)

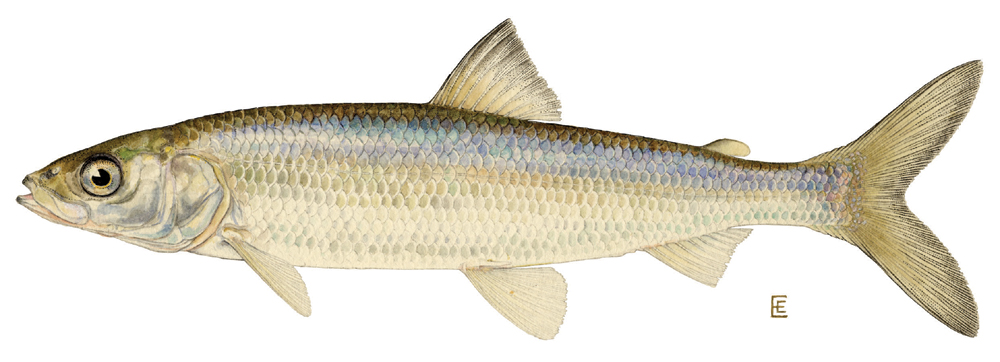
Cisco or lake herring, Coregonus artedi

- Coregonus atterensis Kottelat, 1997
- Coregonus austriacus C. C. Vogt, 1909
- Coregonus autumnalis (Pallas, 1776) (Arctic cisco)
- Coregonus baerii Kessler, 1864
- Coregonus baicalensis Dybowski, 1874
- Coregonus baunti Mukhomediyarov, 1948
- Coregonus bavaricus Hofer, 1909
- †Coregonus bezola Fatio, 1888 (bezoule)
- Coregonus brienzii Oliver M. Selz, Carmela J. Dönz, Pascal Vonlanthen, Ole Seehausen, 2020
- Coregonus candidus Goll, 1883
- Coregonus chadary Dybowski, 1869 (Khadary whitefish)
- Coregonus clupeaformis (Mitchill, 1818) (lake whitefish)
- Coregonus clupeoides Lacépède, 1803 (powan)
- Coregonus confusus Fatio, 1885
- Coregonus danneri C. C. Vogt, 1908
- Coregonus duplex Fatio, 1890
- Coregonus fatioi Kottelat, 1997
- †Coregonus fera Jurine, 1825 (fera)
- Coregonus fontanae M. Schulz & Freyhof, 2003 (Stechlin cisco)
- †Coregonus gutturosus (C. C. Gmelin (de), 1818)
- Coregonus heglingus Schinz, 1822
- †Coregonus hiemalis Jurine, 1825 (gravenche)
- Coregonus hoferi L. S. Berg, 1932
- Coregonus holsata Thienemann, 1916

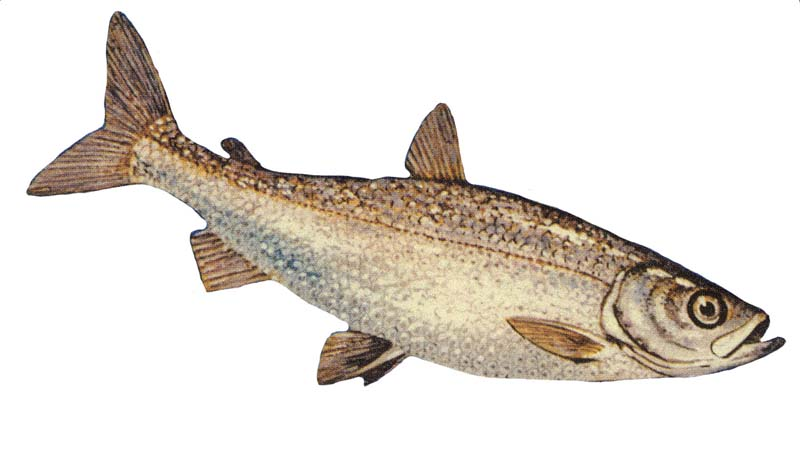
Bloater, Coregonus hoyi

- Coregonus hoyi (Milner, 1874) (bloater)
- Coregonus huntsmani W. B. Scott, 1987 (Atlantic whitefish)
- †Coregonus johannae (G. Wagner, 1910) (deepwater cisco)
- Coregonus kiletz Michailovsky, 1903
- Coregonus kiyi (Koelz, 1921) (kiyi)
- Coregonus ladogae Pravdin, Golubev & Belyaeva, 1938
- Coregonus laurettae T. H. Bean, 1881 (Bering cisco)

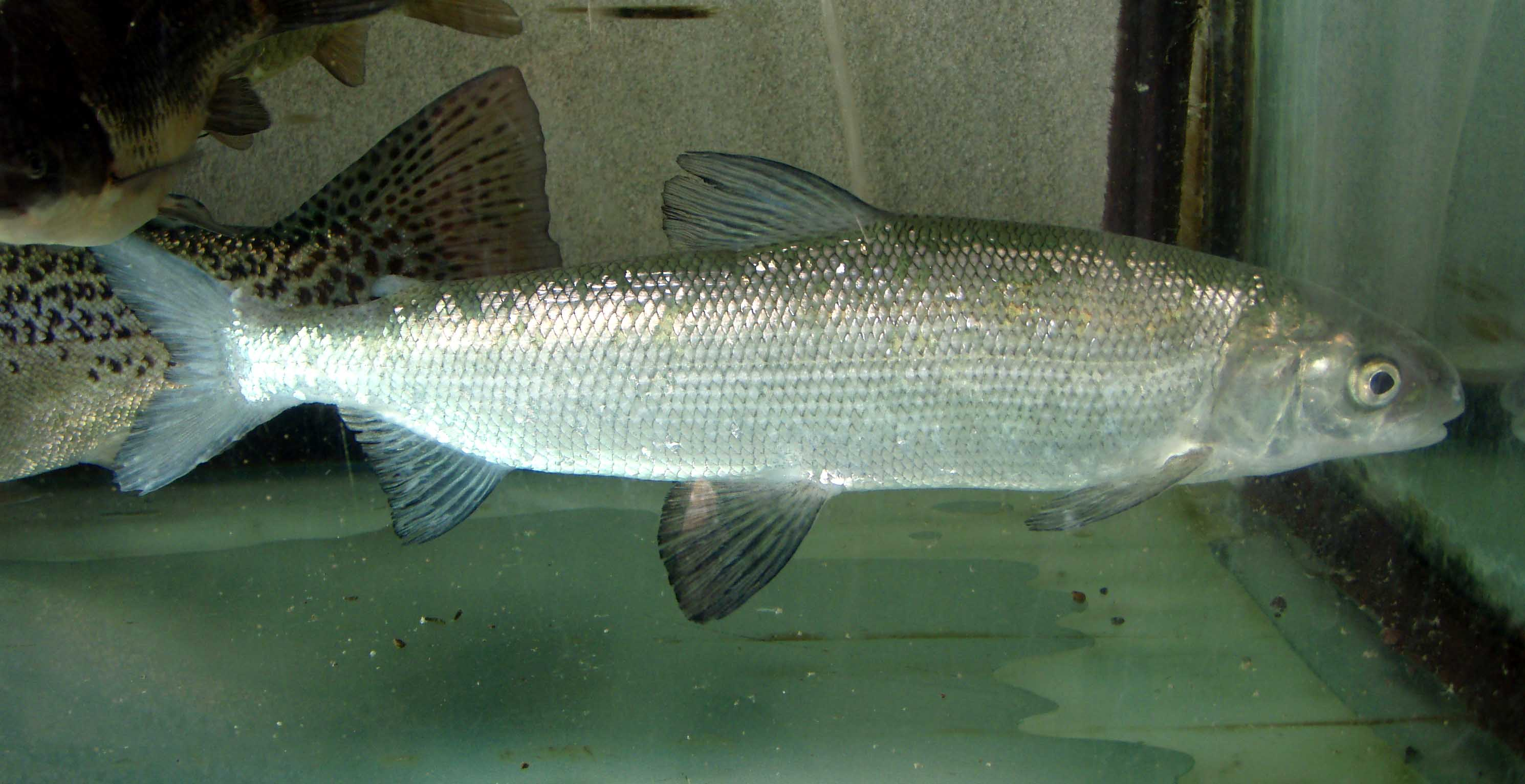
Common whitefish, Coregonus lavaretus (sensu lato)

- Coregonus lavaretus Linnaeus, 1758 (common whitefish, European whitefish; lavaret)
- Coregonus lucinensis Thienemann, 1933
- Coregonus lutokka Kottelat, Bogutskaya & Freyhof, 2005
- Coregonus macrophthalmus Nüsslin, 1882
- Coregonus maraena (Bloch, 1779) (maraena whitefish)
- Coregonus maraenoides L. S. Berg, 1916
- Coregonus maxillaris Günther, 1866
- Coregonus megalops Widegren, 1863 (lacustrine fluvial whitefish)
- Coregonus migratorius (Georgi, 1775) (omul)
- Coregonus muksun (Pallas, 1814) (muksun)
- Coregonus nasus (Pallas, 1776) (broad whitefish)

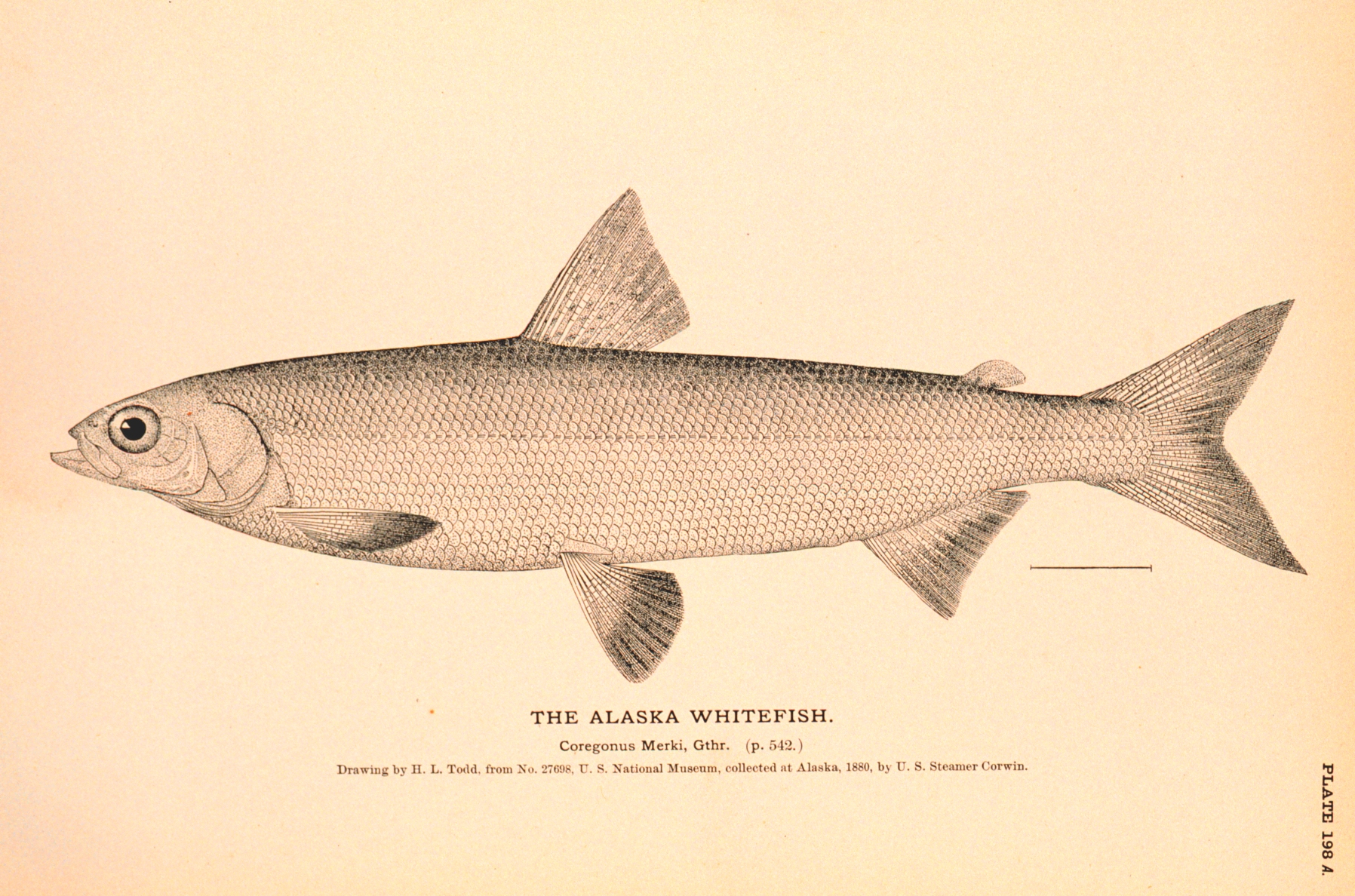
Coregonus nelsonii

- Coregonus nelsonii T. H. Bean, 1884 (Alaska whitefish)
- †Coregonus nigripinnis (Milner, 1874) (blackfin cisco)
- Coregonus nilssoni Valenciennes, 1848
- Coregonus nipigon (Koelz, 1925)
- Coregonus nobilis Haack, 1882
- †Coregonus oxyrinchus Linnaeus, 1758 (houting)
- Coregonus palaea G. Cuvier, 1829
- Coregonus pallasii Valenciennes, 1848
- Coregonus peled (J. F. Gmelin, 1789) (peled)
- Coregonus pennantii Valenciennes, 1848 (gwyniad)

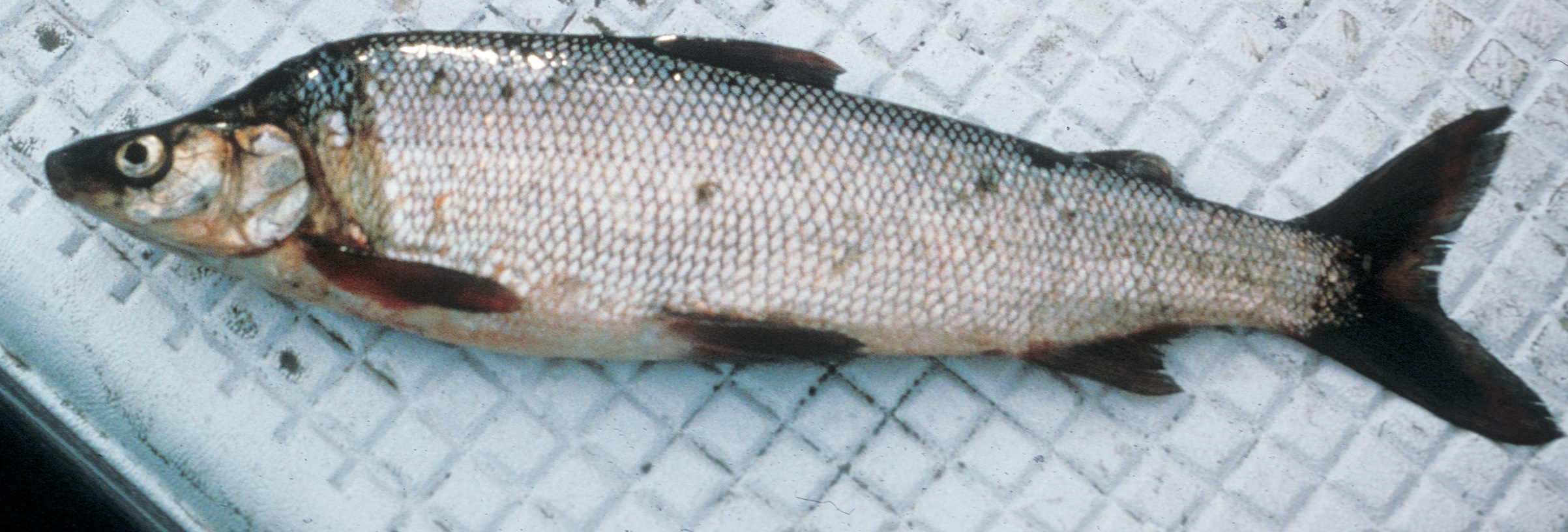
Coregonus pidschian

- Coregonus pidschian (J. F. Gmelin, 1789) (humpback whitefish)
- Coregonus pollan W. Thompson, 1835 (Irish pollan)
- Coregonus pravdinellus Dulkeit, 1949
- Coregonus profundus Oliver M. Selz, Carmela J. Dönz, Pascal Vonlanthen, Ole Seehausen, 2020
- Coregonus reighardi (Koelz, 1924) (shortnose cisco)
- Coregonus renke (Schrank, 1783)
- †Coregonus restrictus Fatio, 1885
- Coregonus sardinella Valenciennes, 1848 (Sardine cisco)
- Coregonus steinmanni Oliver M. Selz, Carmela J. Dönz, Pascal Vonlanthen, Ole Seehausen, 2020
- Coregonus stigmaticus Regan, 1908 (schelly)
- Coregonus subautumnalis Kaganowsky, 1932
- Coregonus suidteri Fatio, 1885
- Coregonus trybomi Svärdson (sv), 1979
- Coregonus tugun (Pallas, 1814)
- Coregonus ussuriensis L. S. Berg, 1906 (Amur whitefish)
- Coregonus vandesius J. Richardson, 1836 (vendace)
- Coregonus vessicus Dryagin, 1932
- Coregonus wartmanni (Bloch, 1784)
- Coregonus widegreni Malmgren, 1863 (Valaam whitefish)
- Coregonus zenithicus (D. S. Jordan & Evermann, 1909) (shortjaw cisco)
- Coregonus zuerichensis Nüsslin, 1882
- Coregonus zugensis Nüsslin, 1882
