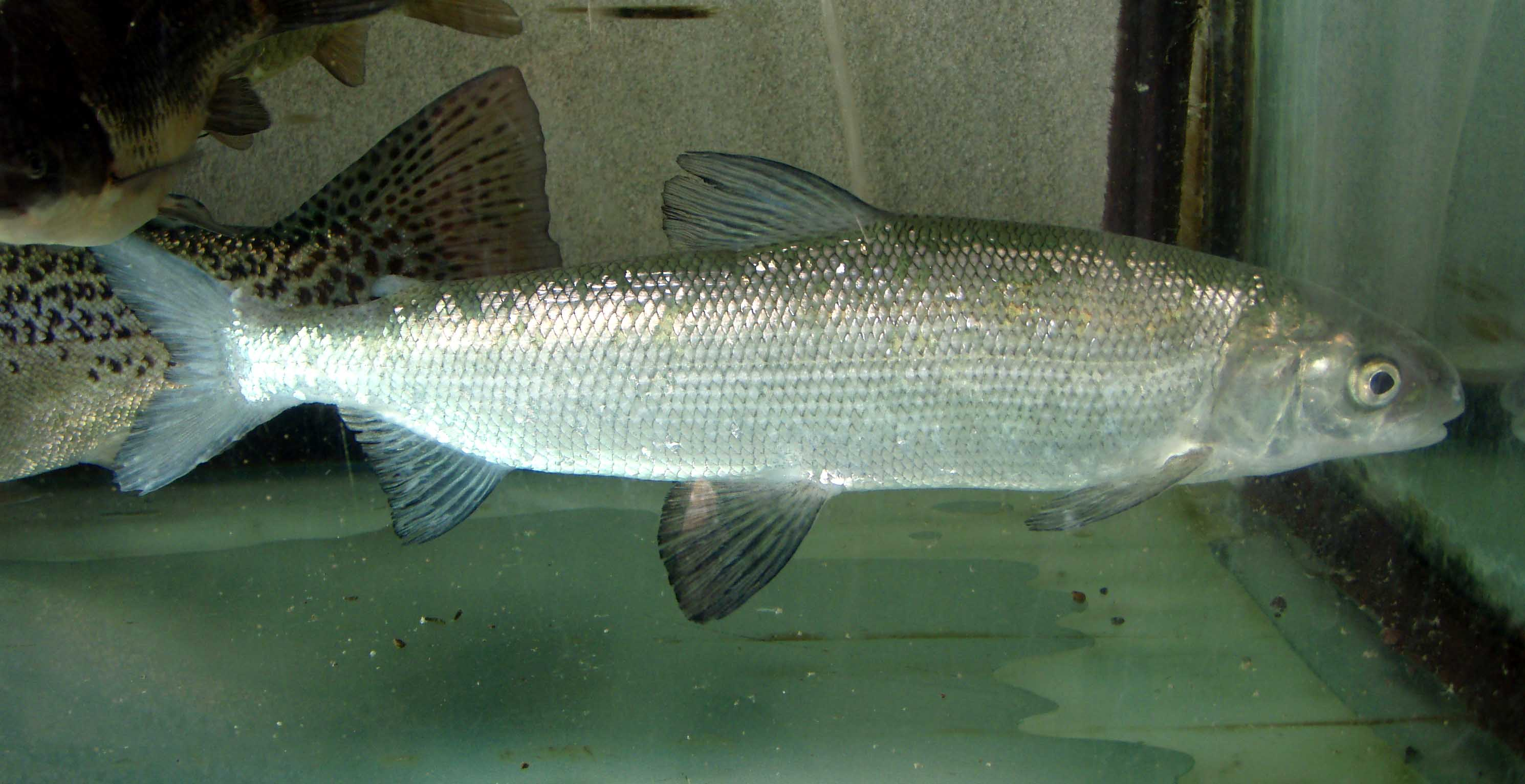

Conservation status
- Least Concern (IUCN 3.1)

Scientific classification
- Kingdom: Animalia
- Phylum: Chordata
- Class: Actinopterygii
- Order: Salmoniformes
- Family: Salmonidae
- Genus: Coregonus
- Species: C. maraena

Binomial name
- Coregonus maraena (Bloch, 1779)

Synonyms
- Salmo maraena Bloch, 1779; Coregonus lavaretus maraena (Bloch, 1779); Coregonus lapponicus Günther, 1866; Coregonus lloydii Günther, 1866; Coregonus maraena pommerana Thienemann, 1916; Coregonus lavaretus vaetterensis Thienemann, 1921; Coregonus lavaretus f. baltica Thienemann, 1922; Coregonus lavaretus f. balticus Thienemann, 1922; Coregonus holsatus vigrensis Litynski, 1923; Coregonus amnipetens Freidenfelt, 1928; Coregonus lavaretus mediospinatus Pravdin, 1931; Coregonus lavaretus bergi Pravdin, 1931; Coregonus lavaretus vygensis Pravdin, 1948; Coregonus lavaretus vygensis telekinae Pravdin, 1948

= Coregonus maraena =

Species of fish

Coregonus maraena, referred to in English as the maraene, maraena whitefish, vendace, cisco, lake herring, lake whitefish or the whitefish, is a whitefish of the family Salmonidae that occurs in the Baltic Sea basin – in the sea itself and the inflowing rivers, and in several lakes as landlocked populations. It is found in Denmark, Estonia, Finland, Germany, Latvia, Lithuania, Netherlands, Norway, Poland, Slovakia (Štrbské pleso), Russia and Sweden. Up to 2023, it was listed as a vulnerable species by the IUCN, but this is now revised to Least Concern. It is listed as endangered by HELCOM. It is an extremely important fish within the Baltic Sea ecosystem, both for population equilibrium and for the local diets of the surrounding human population. Due to a variety of factors, mostly overfishing, the maraena's population dwindled to near-extinction levels. Thus, rampant repopulation was enacted to preserve this important fish.

In the Baltic basin countries, this species has traditionally been known as Coregonus lavaretus (the common whitefish). The name Coregonus maraena has been adopted following the suggestion that the name Coregonus lavaretus should only be applied narrowly to some whitefish populations in France and Switzerland, as advocated by Kottelat and Freyhof, and repeated by the IUCN and FishBase.
