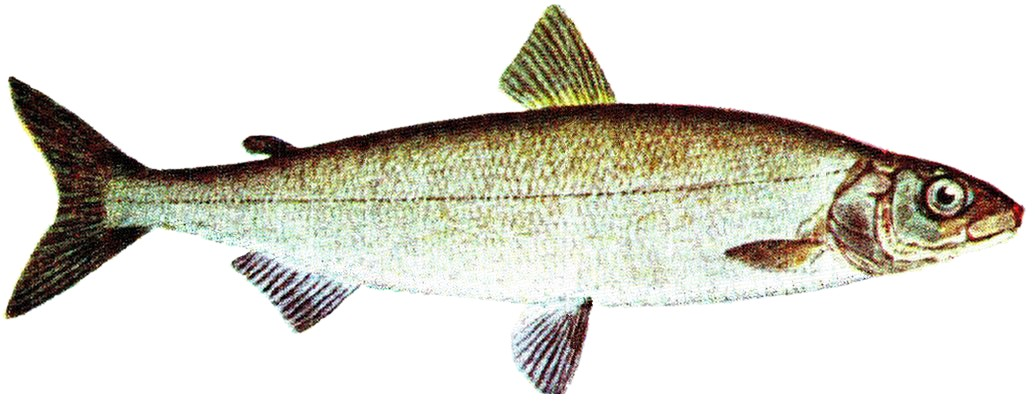
- European whitefish (Coregonus lavaretus)

Conservation status
- Vulnerable (IUCN 3.1)

Scientific classification
- Kingdom: Animalia
- Phylum: Chordata
- Class: Actinopterygii
- Division: Teleostei
- Order: Salmoniformes
- Family: Salmonidae
- Genus: Coregonus
- Species: C. lavaretus

Binomial name
- Coregonus lavaretus (Linnaeus, 1758)

Synonyms
- Coregonus oxyrinchus (Linnaeus, 1758)

= Coregonus lavaretus =

Species of fish

Coregonus lavaretus is a species of freshwater whitefish, in the family Salmonidae. It is the type species of its genus Coregonus.

There are widely different concepts about the delimitation of the species Coregonus lavaretus and about the number of species in the genus Coregonus in general.

== Lavaret ==
In a narrow sense, Coregonus lavaretus, or the lavaret, is considered to be endemic to Lake Bourget and Lake d'Aiguebelette in the Rhône river basin in France, whereas it formerly also occurred in Lake Geneva. According to this view there is a great number of distinct whitefish species in lakes, rivers and brackish waters of Central and Northern Europe.

== European whitefish (common whitefish) ==
European whitefish under a spruce tree in the coat of arms of Honkilahti

In the broad sense, Coregonus lavaretus, in English referred to as the common whitefish or European whitefish, is widespread from central and northwest Europe to Siberia. Often called the C. lavaretus complex and considered as a superspecies, it encompasses many of the whitefish populations suggested by others to be locally restricted species (such as the British powan and the gwyniad or the Alpine gravenche, as well as distinct intralacustrine morphs and populations characterized by different feeding habits, gill raker numbers, growth patterns and migration behaviour. Genetic studies suggest that the whitefish diversity within this complex is mostly of post-glacial origin. The resource polymorphism represented by the feeding morphs has evolved repeatedly and independently within individual lakes, and similar morphs in different lakes are not closely related to each other.

=== Description ===
There is much variation among the European whitefish forms, but in general they have a tapered body, a slightly protruding upper jaw and a fleshy dorsal fin that is typical of the salmon family. The snout is short and tapered, a fact that distinguishes this species from the two other North European Coregonus species, vendace (Coregonus albula) and the introduced peled (Coregonus peled). The former has a protuberant lower jaw while in the latter, the jaws are equal in length. The back is bluish green or brownish, the flanks silvery and the belly white. The fins are dark grey. This fish seldom grows more than 55 cm (22 in) long or exceeds 2 kg (4.4 lb) in weight.

=== Biology ===
The European whitefish mostly feed on bottom-dwelling invertebrates or zooplankton. Larger fish also take insects off the surface of the water and eat fish fry. Breeding takes place in the autumn between September and November, largely depending on the water temperature. Different populations in the same sections of water may spawn at different times. Many populations in seas and lakes tend to make their way up-river to spawn, but others populations remain in lakes or the sea even when breeding.

== Houting ==
The houting (Coregonus oxyrhinchus) is a European species of whitefish in the family Salmonidae that was long thought extinct. It was native to the estuaries and rivers draining to the North Sea. The houting is distinguishable from other Coregonus taxa by having a long, pointed snout, an inferior mouth and a different number of gill rakers. The houting once occurred in Belgium, France, Germany, the Netherlands and England. In 2023, DNA analysis found the houting to be genetically indistinguishable from Coregonus lavaretus, and therefore not extinct.

=== Controversial status ===
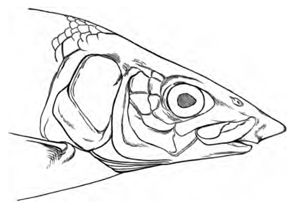
Houting head

There is controversy whether whitefish surviving in the southeastern North Sea sector of Denmark (Wadden Sea) and considered there as houting (Danish: snæbel) represent the same species as the houting that was extirpated from the more southwestern parts of the North Sea. Like the more southwestern population, the Danish North Sea population has a long, pointed snout and an inferior mouth, and it is anadromous, spending most of its adult life in coastal waters, but migrating into rivers to breed (some other European Coregonus occur in brackish water, but the ability to live long-term in full salt water is unique to the houting).

The Danish houting is genetically part of the widespread Coregonus lavaretus complex (including Coregonus maraena of the Baltic Sea basin; some prefer to include the Danish houting in this species), while its genetic relationship to the extinct population cannot be confirmed due to a lack of sufficient samples of the latter. Nevertheless, there are some minor differences in the genetics of the Danish houting compared to other living members in the C. lavaretus complex, as well as the differences in morphology and ecology, making it an evolutionarily significant unit. Hybridization and introgression between North Sea houting and its relatives is well-documented, and likely the result of translocations of Coregonus between different regions by humans. Some researchers argue that the morphological differences between different houting populations are not exceptional within the broader variation of the European whitefish, and probably no species-level extinction has taken place. The primary reason for treating the Danish houting and the extinct houting as separate are differences in the number of gill rakers (on average, the Danish has fewer than the extinct), but this number can vary extensively in Coregonus, even within a single population and species, and genetic studies of Coregonus have shown that gill rakers are of limited use in predicting relationship among populations. Some think that the morphological differences in number of gill rakers are sufficient for treating them as separate, and that the last true houting was caught in the lower Rhine in 1940. Studies in the early 2000s (decade) indicated that there was no overlap in the possible number of gill rakers of the two (28–35 in the Danish; 38–46 in the extinct), but later reviews have shown that there is an overlap (up to 41 has been found in the Elbe, a reintroduced population based on Danish houting).

A €13 million restoration project of the Danish houting, partly funded by the European Union's LIFE programme and the Danish Natural Agency, was undertaken in 2005–2013, and there is ongoing monitoring of the species and regulation of the fish-eating great cormorant from important locations. As of 2019, a total of more than €20 million has been used on its conservation, with almost two-thirds funded by Denmark and the remaining by the European Union. However, the only remaining fully natural and significant population of Danish houting is in the Vidå River, estimated in 2014 to consist of about 3,500 adults. Little is known about its exact spawning and juvenile requirements, and despite the earlier project it was still declining, leading to fears that it could become fully extinct unless more is done to preserve it. After years with a downward trend in its numbers, an increase to about 4,000 adult Danish houtings was registered in 2018–19, with most individuals in the Vidå and fewer in Ribe River (both populations increasing).

Individuals from the Danish population have been used as a basis for re-establishing houting in the Eider, Elbe (both indisputably a natural part of the range) and Rhine (arguably non-native, if the extinct is recognized as a separate species). On the 24th of October 2023 researchers of the Research Institute for Nature and Forest in Belgium captured a live specimen in the Scheldt river in Kruibeke, while the species was thought to be extinct in the country for over 100 years. Possibly the specimen migrated there from the Rhine population. In Annex II of the EC Habitats Directive (92/43/EEC), a species listed as Coregonus oxyrhynchus [sic] is protected for 'anadromous populations in certain sectors of the North Sea'

In 2023, DNA analysis found the houting to be genetically indistinguishable from Coregonus lavaretus, and therefore not extinct.
