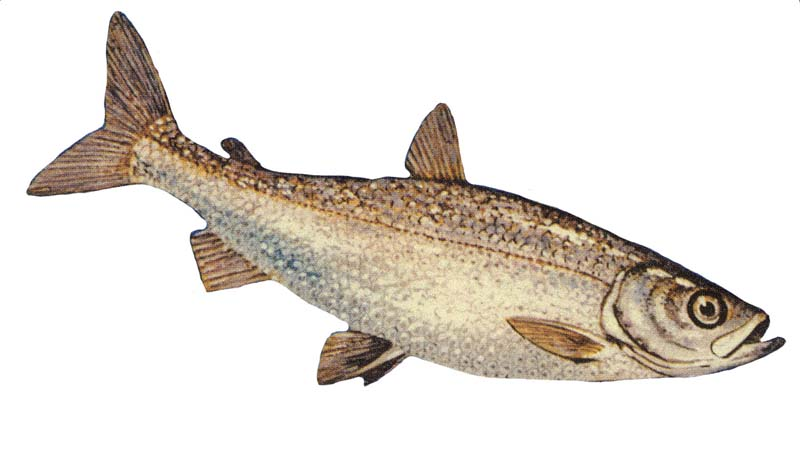
- Bloater (Coregonus hoyi)

Scientific classification
- Kingdom: Animalia
- Phylum: Chordata
- Class: Actinopterygii
- Order: Salmoniformes
- Family: Salmonidae
- Subfamily: Coregoninae; Bonaparte, 1845

Genera
- Coregonus; Prosopium; Stenodus; †Beckius; †Parastenodus

= Freshwater whitefish =

Freshwater whitefish Temporal range: Late Eocene–present

Subfamily of fishes

The freshwater whitefish are fishes of the subfamily Coregoninae, which contains whitefishes (both freshwater and anadromous) and ciscoes, and is one of three subfamilies in the salmon family Salmonidae. Apart from the subfamily Coregoninae, the family Salmonidae includes the salmon, trout, and char species of the subfamily Salmoninae, and grayling species of the subfamily Thymallinae. Freshwater whitefish are distributed mainly in relatively cool waters throughout the northern parts of the Northern Hemisphere.

== Taxonomy ==
The Coregoninae subfamily consists of three nominal genera:

- Coregonus Linnaeus, 1758 – whitefishes and ciscoes, which according to some authors number more than 60 species. There are differing opinions on the classification of some species within the genus and the overall number of species. Some species in Arctic regions of Asia and North America forage in marine waters.
- Prosopium Jordan, 1878 – round whitefishes, which includes six species, three of which occur only in a single lake.
- Stenodus Richardson, 1836 – inconnus, which includes two species, sometimes considered a single species with two subspecies. Phylogenetically, Stenodus is not distinct from Coregonus.

Two fossil genera (Beckius David, 1946 and Parastenodus David, 1946) are also known, both only from isolated scales from the Late Eocene or early Oligocene Kreyenhagen Shale of the San Joaquin Valley, California.

== Niche ==
In their ecosystems, whitefish tend to be some of the largest fish and occupy niches as benthic predators. The recent invasion of several invasive species, including the sea lamprey and zebra mussels, has begun to pose a threat to the whitefish population by disrupting historic ecological relationships and prey distribution. This has been exacerbated by other changes to their habitat such as changes in land use, climate change, and the introduction of outside nutrients through runoff.

== Whitefish as food ==
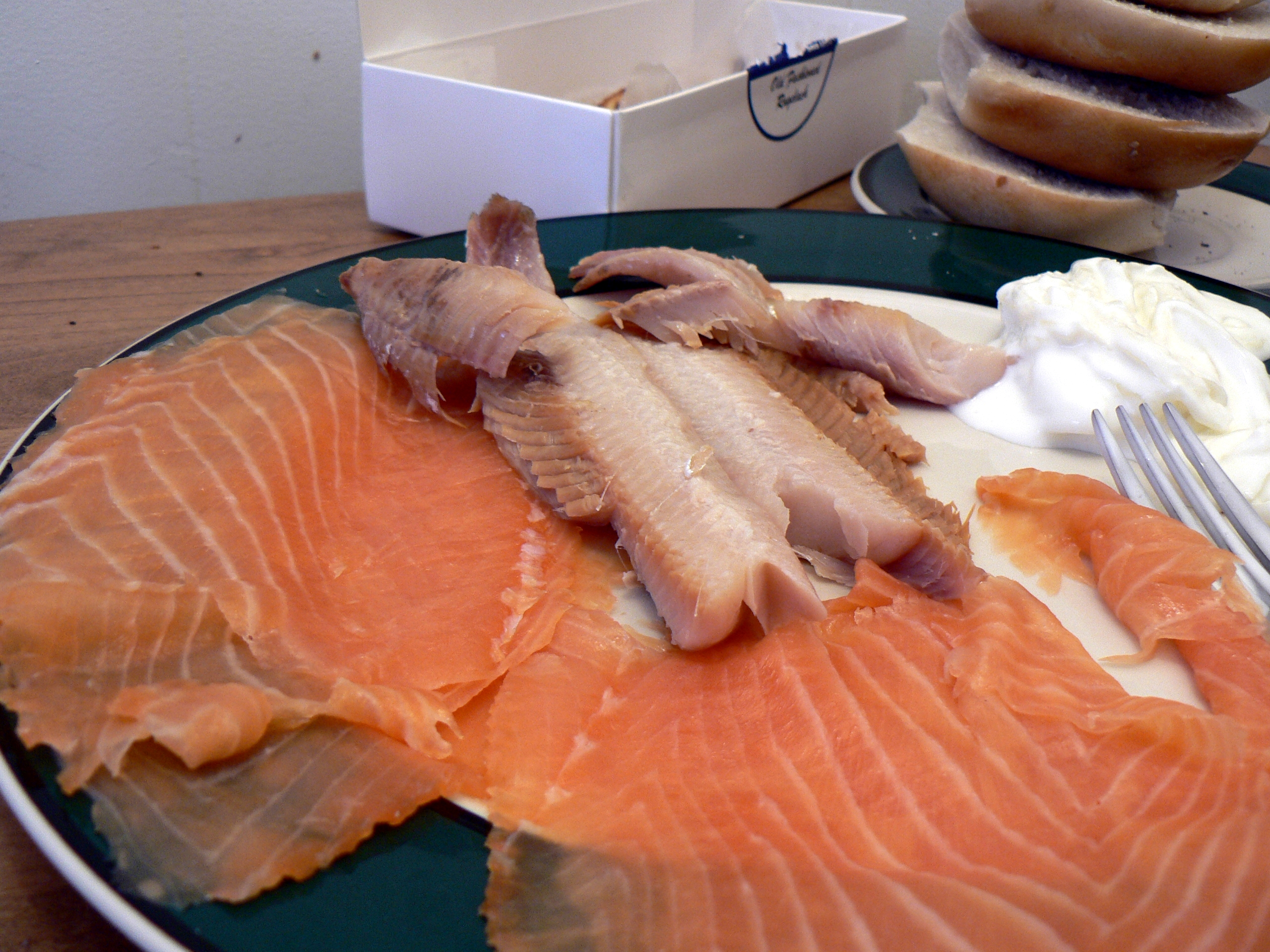
Lox, smoked whitefish, cream cheese, and bagels

Freshwater whitefish is known for its mild flavor and high omega-3 fatty acid content. It is generally favored by those who dislike stronger fishy taste. Lake whitefish is one of the most commonly consumed varieties of freshwater whitefish. It is especially popular in the Great Lakes region, where it can frequently be found, usually grilled or fried, as a popular offering in many restaurants. Smoked whitefish is locally produced as well. Many freshwater whitefish species have also made up an important component of the traditional diets of many indigenous people who have historically inhabited its range. Smoked whitefish is sold in American delicatessens, especially those specializing in Jewish cuisine, either filleted or made into whitefish salad.

== Use by Indigenous peoples ==
Lake whitefish, adikameg in Ojibwemowin, has historically been a staple food for the Anishinaabek, a diverse nation native to the Great Lakes region. In recent years, following several legal battles which restored the ability of native peoples to exercise their right to hunt and gather, whitefish has become a major resource for those communities. Native Alaskan communities also gather whitefish, specifically the inconnu (or sheefish), as a subsistence food.

== Evolution due to human interaction ==
There are a multitude of species of freshwater whitefish, some are more valued economically than others. Fishing for markets is not uncommon for species such as Coregonus widegreni and Coregonus lavaretus. At the time, there was an increase in younger groups of C. widegreni because when fishing, humans only wanted the larger fish which ended up being the oldest.
