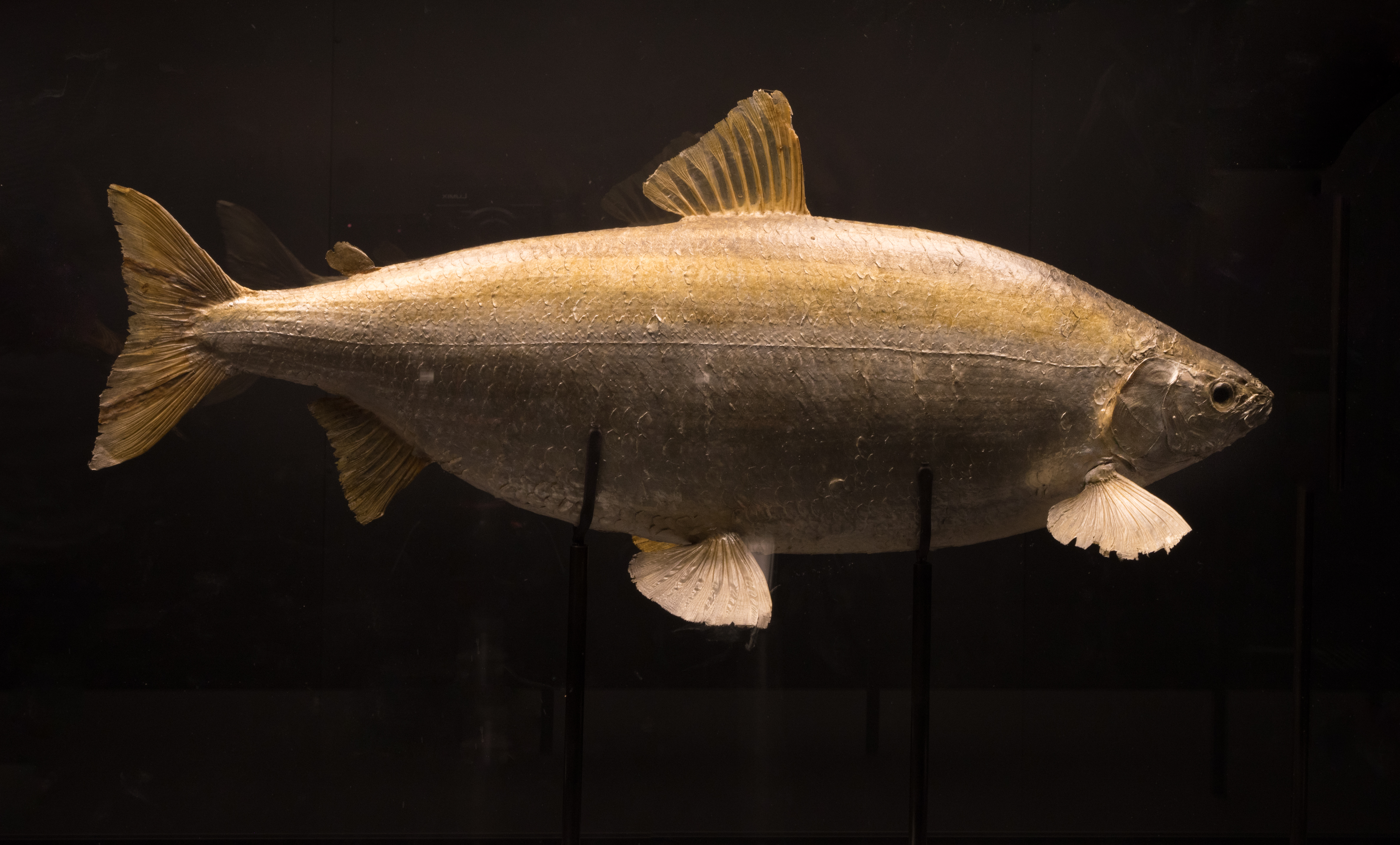
- Specimen in Musée de zoologie de Lausanne

Conservation status
- Extinct (1920s) (IUCN 3.1)

Scientific classification
- Kingdom: Animalia
- Phylum: Chordata
- Class: Actinopterygii
- Division: Teleostei
- Order: Salmoniformes
- Family: Salmonidae
- Genus: Coregonus
- Species: †C. fera

Binomial name
- †Coregonus fera (Jurine, 1825)

= Coregonus fera =

Extinct species of fish

Coregonus fera, commonly called the true fera, is a presumed extinct freshwater fish from Lake Geneva in Switzerland and France.

== Description ==
Illustration from 1909

The fera is a freshwater whitefish that typically grows to between 35 and 40 centimeters in length. It is a member of the common whitefish complex (Coregonus lavaretus sensu lato).

The identity of the fera is disputed. In 1950, Emile Dottrens described Coregonus fera as native to both Lake Geneva and Lake Constance. The coregonines from Lake Constance were named Sandfelchen. In 1997, Maurice Kottelat made a revision and used the name Coregonus fera for the Geneva fera and Coregonus arenicolus for the Sandfelchen. The common name fera is still also used for fish that continue to live in Lake Geneva, but it now refers to the introduced Coregonus palaea.

== Biology ==
The true fera lived at the bottom of lakes, where it fed on zooplankton and spawned between February and mid-March.

== Extinction ==
Together with the similarly extinct gravenche (Coregonus hiemalis), the fera was one of the most caught freshwater fishes in Lake Geneva. In 1890, these two fishes constituted 68% of the total captures in the lake. Due to a combination of overexploitation and heavy hybridisation with introduced Coregonus species, it became extremely scarce and was last seen in Lake Geneva in 1920.
