= Fera =

Fera may refer to:

- Fera (band), a pop rock/singer-songwriter duo from Vancouver, British Columbia, Canada
- Fera (constellation), old name for the southern constellation Lupus
- Fera (fish), a local name for several fish species and the eponymous dish
- Fera (pesäpallo), a women's pesäpallo team from Rauma, Finland
- Fera Airport, Fera Island, the Solomon Islands
- Fera Island, an island in Isabel Province, Solomon Islands
- Fera Science Limited, formerly the Food and Environment Research Agency, UK

FERA may refer to:

- Federal Emergency Relief Administration, US
- Federation of European Film Directors
- Foreign Exchange Regulation Act, India
- Fraud Enforcement and Recovery Act of 2009, US

== See also ==
- Ferae, a clade of mammals consisting of Carnivores and Pholidotes
