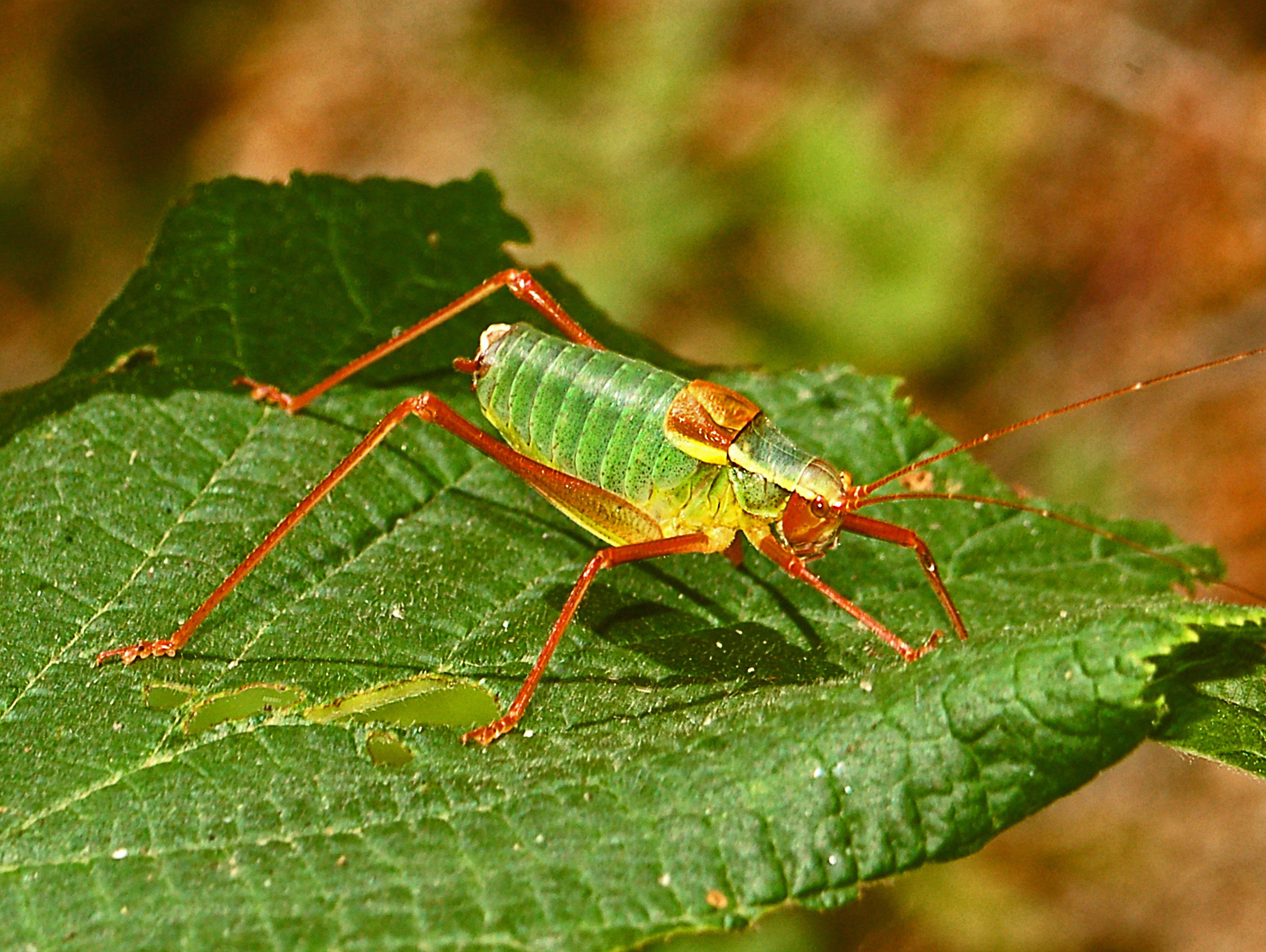
- Barbitistes obtusus. Male
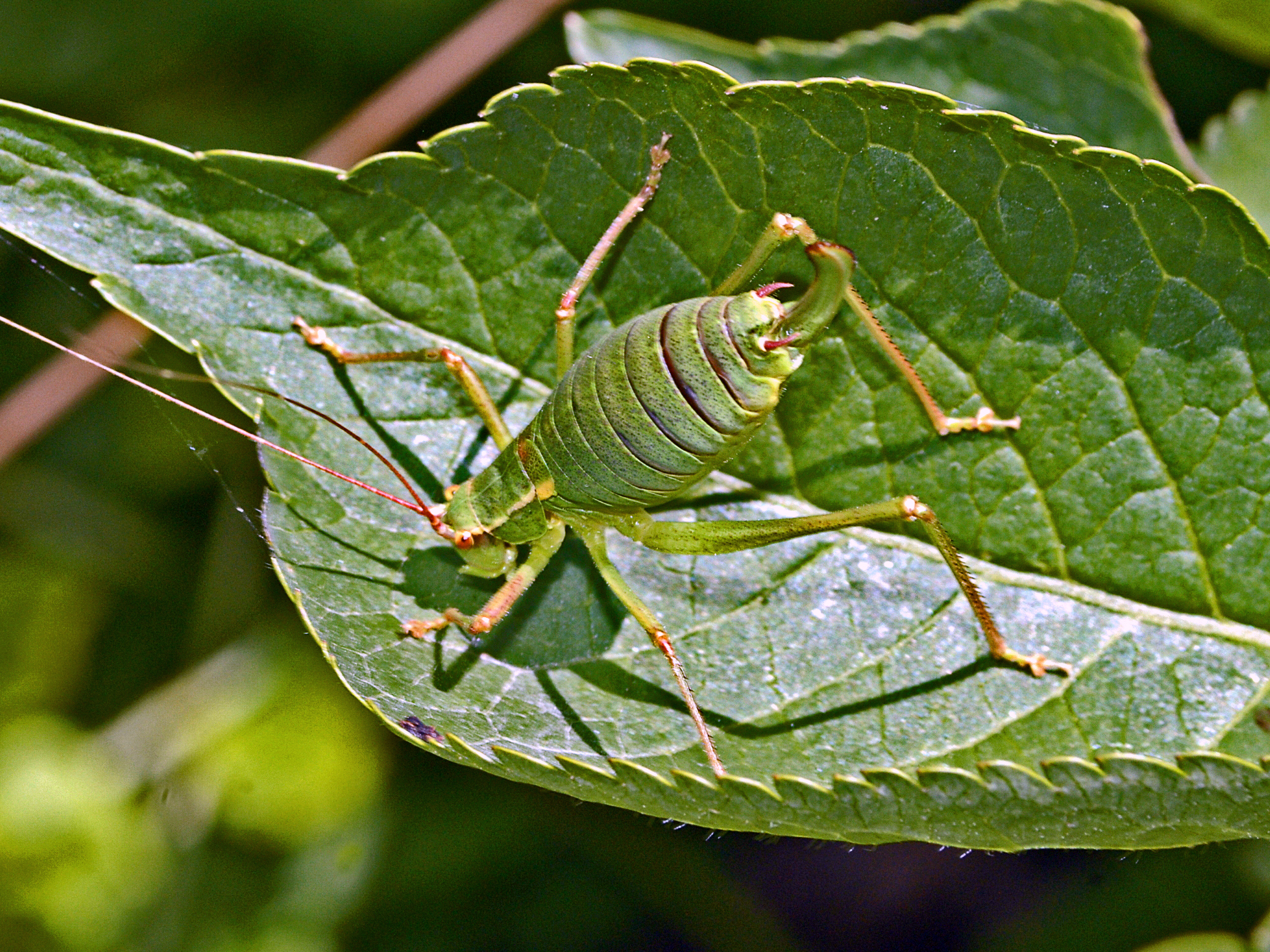
- Barbitistes obtusus. Female

Scientific classification
- Kingdom: Animalia
- Phylum: Arthropoda
- Clade: Pancrustacea
- Class: Insecta
- Order: Orthoptera
- Suborder: Ensifera
- Family: Tettigoniidae
- Subfamily: Phaneropterinae
- Genus: Barbitistes
- Species: B. obtusus

Binomial name
- Barbitistes obtusus Targioni-Tozzetti, 1881

Synonyms
- List: Barbitistes alpinus Fruhstorfer, 1920; Barbitistes obtusus alpina Fruhstorfer, 1920; Barbitistes obtusus alpinus Fruhstorfer, 1920

= Barbitistes obtusus =

Species of cricket-like animal

Close-Up of a Barbitistes obtusus

Barbitistes obtusus, the southern saw-tailed bush-cricket or Alpine saw bush-cricket, is a species of bush crickets in the subfamily Phaneropterinae.

== Distribution and habitat ==
This species replaces Barbitistes serricauda in the Southern Alps. It is present in France, Italy and Switzerland, from the Basses-Alpes to the Julian Alps and central Apennines, with a small populations in the Apuan Alps. This typical mountain species prefers lightly shaded woods and scrubland up to 2000 meters a.s.l.. It is often found on blackberry leaves.

== Description ==
Barbitistes obtusus can reach a length of 18–20 millimetres (0.71–0.79 in) in males, of 20–21 millimetres (0.79–0.83 in) in female, with an ovipositor of 9–10 millimetres (0.35–0.39 in). This species is very similar to Barbitistes serricauda, so that both species are difficult to distinguish from each other.

The ground color varies greatly from gray and light brown to olive green and turquoise. Dark individuals are rare. The head is reddish. The reddish to dark antennae are about a body length and show a small bright ring at regular intervals. Two yellow stripes with red border extend from the eyes on pronotum and tegmina. The abdomen is short and thick, while the pronotum and head are quite small. The abdomen has tiny dark spots. The reddish legs are of medium length and wear small spines. The sharply formed wings are reddish brown and laterally yellow lined. In the female the wings are shorter and they may be greenish, yellowish or reddish brown. The cerci of the male are dark red-brown, clearly S-shaped, with rounded apex. They are the most important distinction between this species and Barbitistes serricauda.

== Biology ==
Adults can be found from June to August feeding on plants and small invertebrates. About egg laying and development little is known. The singing of this species consists of short sounds generated 3-10 times per minute depending on the temperature.

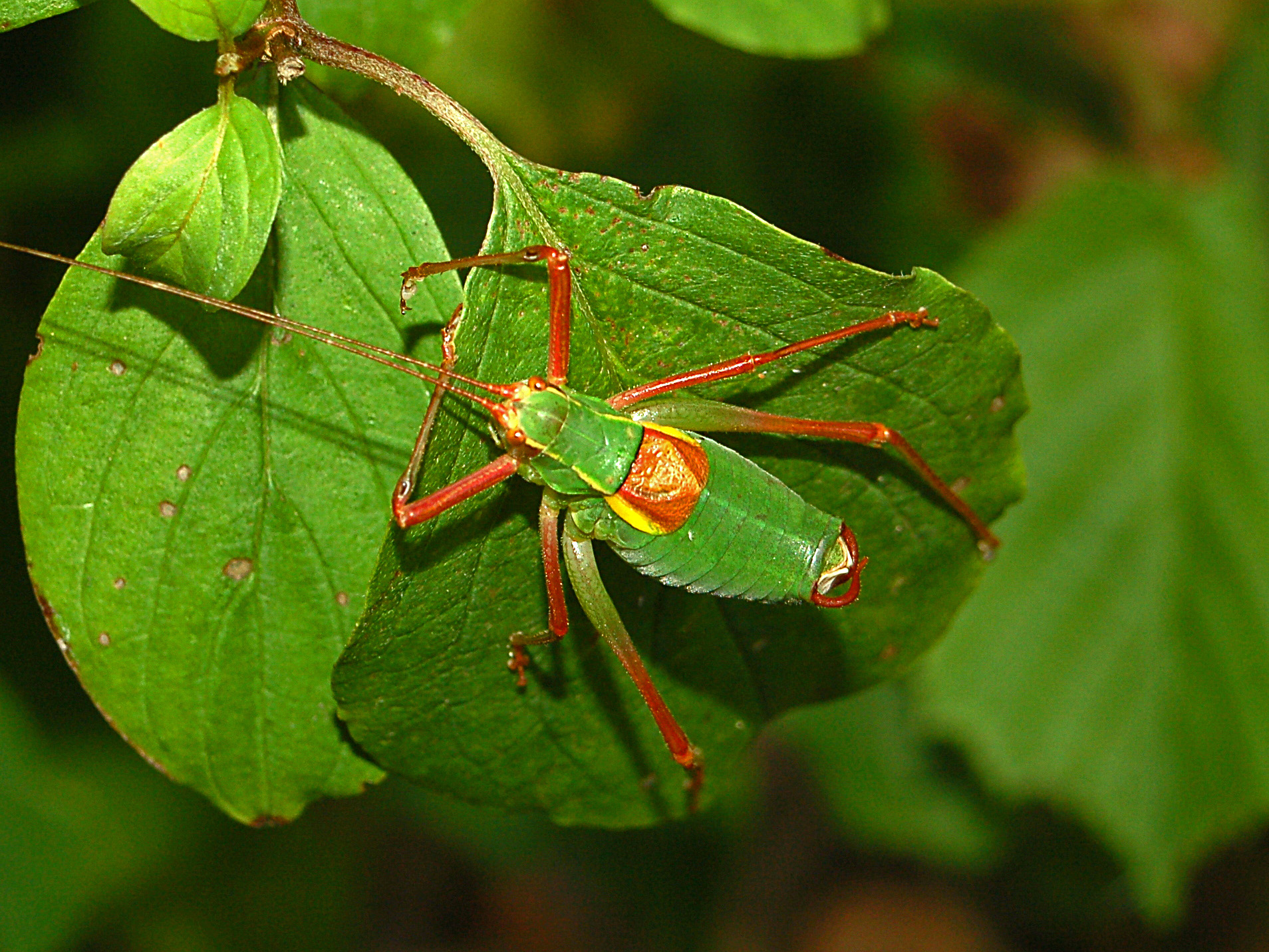
Barbitistes obtusus, male. Dorsal view

== Bibliography ==
- Fontana & Buzzetti (2004) Biogeographical considerations on some Mediterranean Phaneropteridae and description of a new genus and a new species from South Africa (Orthoptera), Memorie della Società Entomologica Italiana (Mem. Soc. Entomol. Ital.) 82(2):441-468
- Defaut [Ed.] (2001), La détermination des Orthoptères de France, Defaut, Bedeilhac 85
- Defaut (1999) Synopsis des orthoptères de France, Matériaux Orthoptériques et Entomocenotiques 2:87
- Voisin [Ed.] (2003) Atlas des Orthoptères et des Mantides de France, Patrimoines Naturels 60:1-104
- Fontana, Buzzetti, Cogo & Odé (2002), Guida al riconoscimento e allo studio di cavallette, grilli, mantidi e insetti affini del Veneto: Blattaria, Mantodea, Isoptera, Orthoptera, Phasmatodea, Dermaptera, Embidiina, Museo Naturalistico Archaeologico di Vicenza, Vicenza 1-592
- Bellmann & Luquet (1995), Guide des sauterelles, grillons et criquets d'Europe occidentale, Delachaux et Niestle, Lausanne 1-383
- Jacobson & V.L. Bianchi (1905), Orthopteroid and Pseudoneuropteroid Insects of Russian Empire and adjacent countries, Devrien Publ. (In Russian), St. Petersburg
- Baur, H. & Coray (2004) A revision of the Blattodea, Ensifera and Caelifera described by H. Fruhstorfer, Revue suisse de Zoologie (Revue Suisse de Zool.) 111(3):611-630
- Nadig (1987) Saltatoria (Insecta) of the southern and southeastern slopes of the Alps. Part I. Tettigoniidae, Revue suisse de Zoologie (Revue Suisse de Zool.) 94(2):257-356
- Baur, H. & Coray (2004) The status of Barbitistes serricauda (Fabricius, 1794) (Ensifera: Phaneropteridae) - a re-assessment, Revue suisse de Zoologie (Revue Suisse de Zool.) 111(4):921-924
