= Fera (fish) =

Common name for several species of fish

Fera is a local name for several fish species of the genus Coregonus from Switzerland, and France, in particular Savoy. The true fera referred to the species Coregonus fera, which was endemic to Lake Geneva, but is now extinct. The "fera" served as a food fish in Switzerland and Savoy refers to the still-surviving relatives of the true fera, which include Coregonus palaea. The Lake Geneva whitefish was locally known as "little fera".
