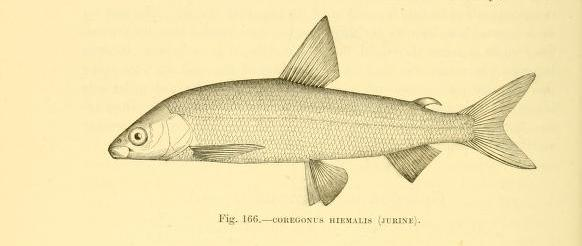

Conservation status
- Extinct (early 1900s) (IUCN 3.1)

Scientific classification
- Kingdom: Animalia
- Phylum: Chordata
- Class: Actinopterygii
- Order: Salmoniformes
- Family: Salmonidae
- Genus: Coregonus
- Species: †C. hiemalis

Binomial name
- †Coregonus hiemalis Jurine, 1825

= Gravenche =

Extinct species of fish

The gravenche (Coregonus hiemalis), also known as the Lake Geneva whitefish or the little fera, is a presumably extinct freshwater fish from Lake Geneva in Switzerland and France.

== Description ==
The gravenche was a species of freshwater whitefish (Coregoninae) that reached a length between 25 and 32 centimetres (9.8 and 12.6 in).

The status of the gravenche is disputed because there are no specimens in museums. While Emile Dottrens described it as subspecies of the common whitefish Coregonus lavaretus in 1958, other experts like Maurice Kottelat regarded it as a full species endemic to Lake Geneva.

== Biology ==
The gravenche is a benthopelagic freshwater fish that swam in the water column near the lake bottom, feeding upon zooplankton. Spawning occurred in mid-December.

== Extinction ==
Together with the likewise extinct true fera (Coregonus fera), the gravenche was one of the most important species for fisheries in Lake Geneva in the late 19th century. In 1890 these two fishes made up 68% of all fish caught in the lake. Overfishing and eutrophication drove the gravenche to near extinction and it was last seen in the early 1900s.
