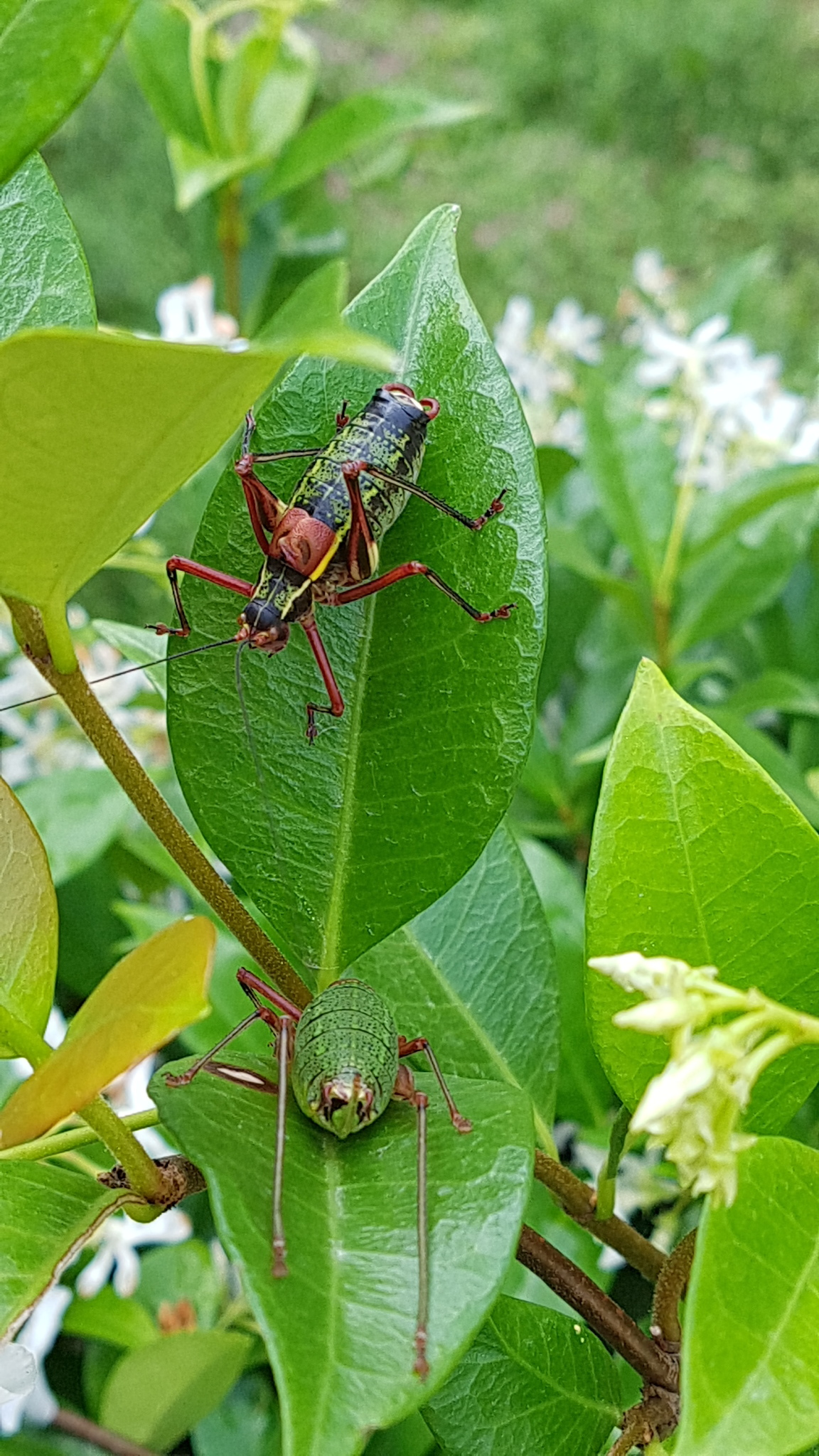

Conservation status
- Near Threatened (IUCN 3.1)

Scientific classification
- Kingdom: Animalia
- Phylum: Arthropoda
- Class: Insecta
- Order: Orthoptera
- Suborder: Ensifera
- Family: Tettigoniidae
- Subfamily: Phaneropterinae
- Genus: Barbitistes
- Species: B. vicetinus

Binomial name
- Barbitistes vicetinus Galvagni & Fontana, 1993

= Barbitistes vicetinus =

Species of cricket-like animal

Barbitistes vicetinus, the Vicentine saw-tailed bush-cricket, is a species of katydids crickets in family Phaneropteridae endemic to Italy. The species was originally described by Antonio Galvagni and Paolo Fontana. It is found in vineyards and woody vegetation in the regions of Veneto and Trentino, in particular in the province of Vicenza (from which it gets its name). In 2016, it was listed as a Near Threatened species by the IUCN due to its restricted geographic range and extreme fluctuations in its population: its current extent of occurrence (EOO) is about 580 km^{2} (220 sq mi), and its area of occupancy (AOO) is between 50–100 km^{2} (19–39 sq mi). Formally described as a new species only in 1993, unexpected population outbreaks have severely impacted forests and crops in northern Italy in recent years.
