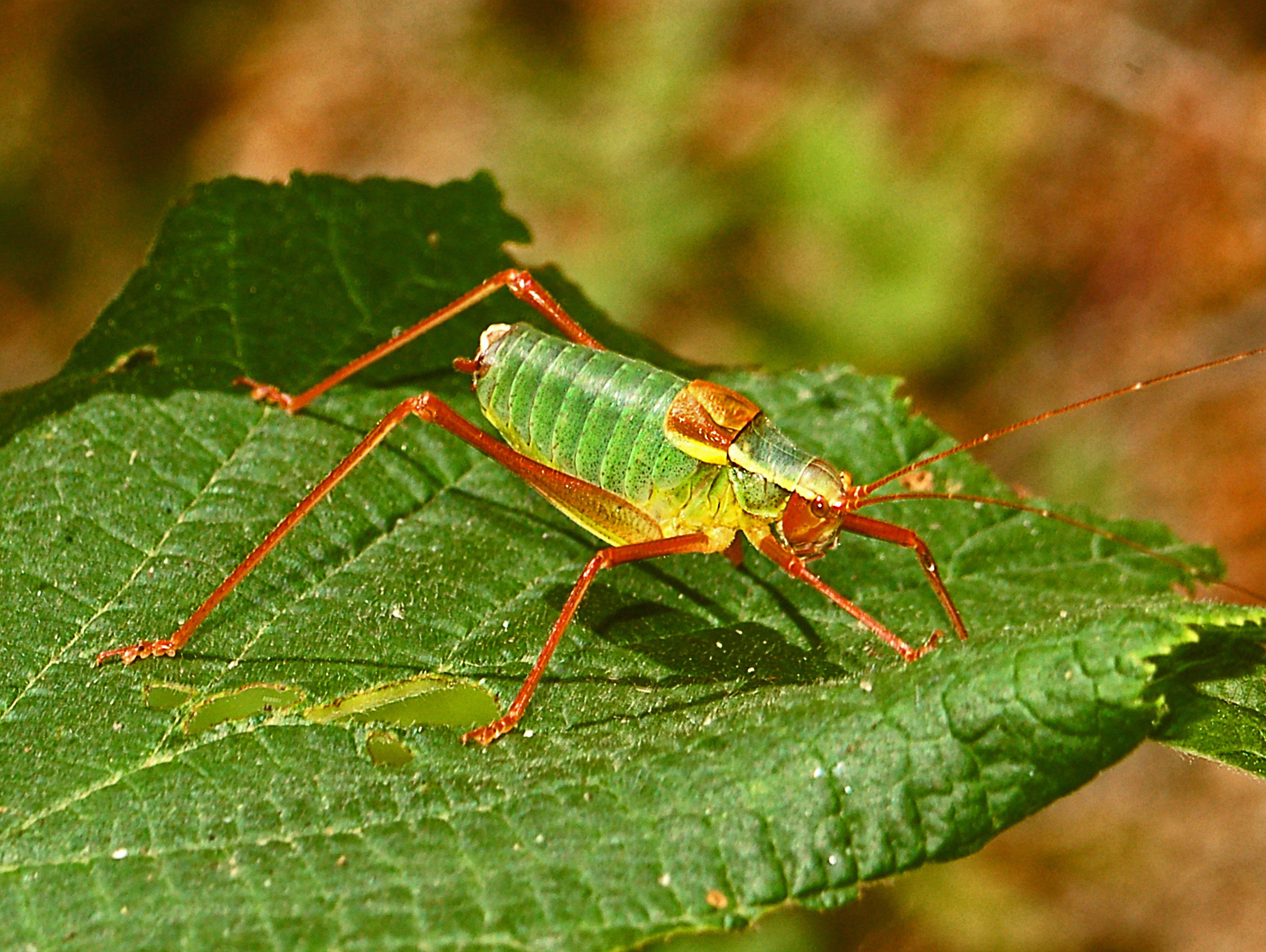
- Adult of Barbitistes obtusus, male

Scientific classification
- Domain: Eukaryota
- Kingdom: Animalia
- Phylum: Arthropoda
- Class: Insecta
- Order: Orthoptera
- Suborder: Ensifera
- Family: Tettigoniidae
- Subfamily: Phaneropterinae
- Tribe: Barbitistini
- Genus: Barbitistes; Charpentier, 1825

= Barbitistes =

Genus of cricket-like animals

Barbitistes is a genus of bush crickets in the subfamily Phaneropterinae.

== Description ==
In the genus Barbitistes the anterior dorsal surface of the vertex (fastigium) is usually conical and blunt. The length of the antenna is approximately 1.5 - 3 fold to body length. The males have long and often tortuous appendages on the rear-most segments ("cerci"). The Barbitistes species are often brightly colored.

== Distribution ==
Species of this genus are present in much of Europe (but not the British Isles or Scandinavia) and in Asia Minor.

== Species ==
This genus contains the following species:

1. Barbitistes alpinus Fruhstorfer, 1920
2. Barbitistes constrictus Brunner von Wattenwyl, 1878
3. Barbitistes fischeri (Yersin, 1854) (synonym B. berenguieri Fagniez, 1935)
4. Barbitistes kaltenbachi Harz, 1965
5. Barbitistes obtusus Targioni-Tozzetti, 1881
6. Barbitistes ocskayi (Charpentier, 1850)
7. Barbitistes serricauda (Fabricius, 1798) - type species
8. Barbitistes vicetinus Galvagni & Fontana, 1993
9. Barbitistes yersini Brunner, 1878
