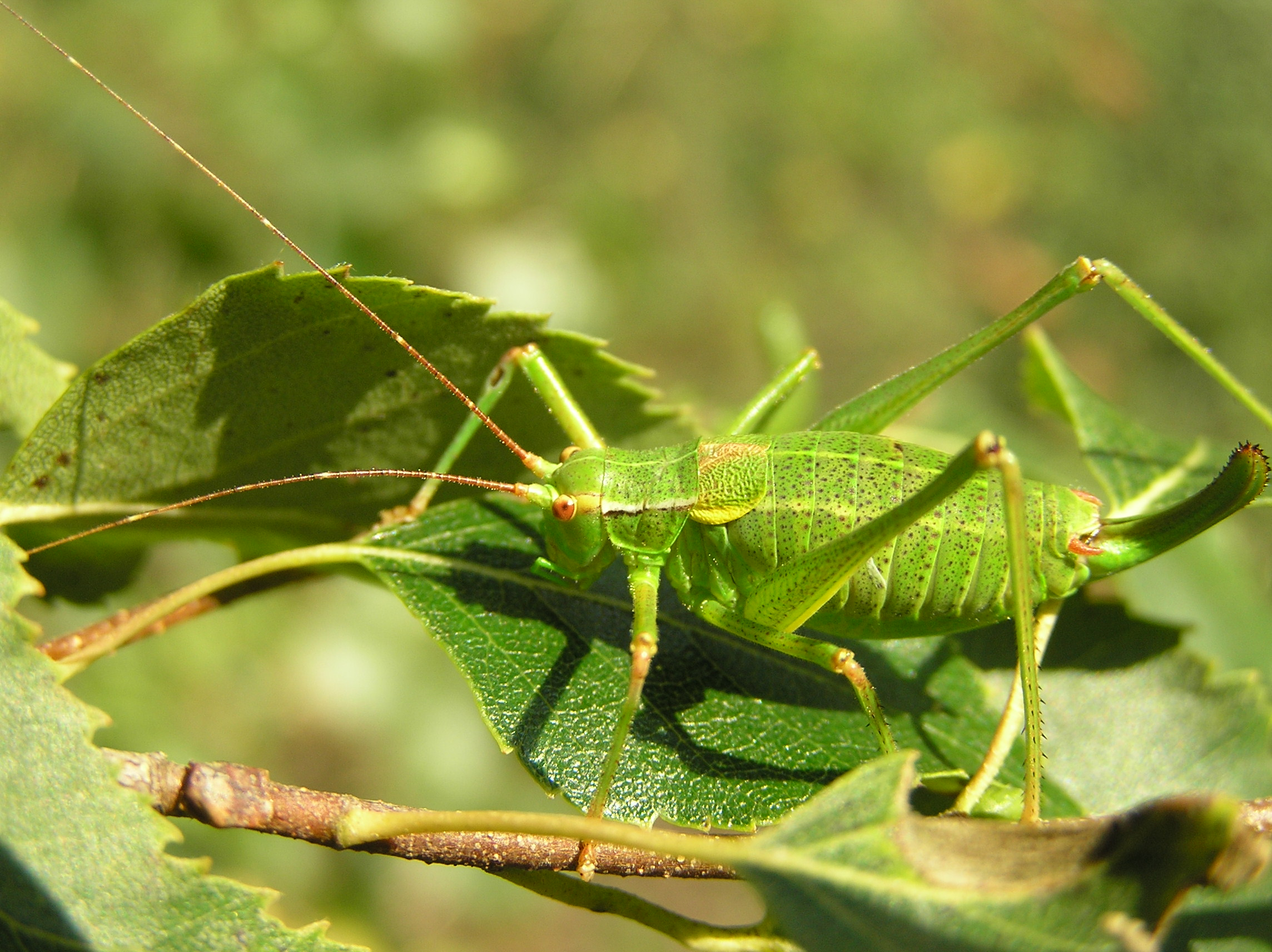
- Barbitistes constrictus Poland

Scientific classification
- Domain: Eukaryota
- Kingdom: Animalia
- Phylum: Arthropoda
- Class: Insecta
- Order: Orthoptera
- Suborder: Ensifera
- Family: Tettigoniidae
- Subfamily: Phaneropterinae
- Genus: Barbitistes
- Species: B. constrictus

Binomial name
- Barbitistes constrictus Brunner von Wattenwyl, 1878

= Barbitistes constrictus =

Species of cricket-like animal

Close-Up of a Barbitistes constrictus

Barbitistes constrictus is a species belonging to the family Tettigoniidae subfamily Phaneropterinae. It is found in Austria, Belarus, Central European Russia, Czech Republic, Estonia, Germany, Hungary, Kaliningrad Region, Latvia, Lithuania, North European Russia, Northwest European Russia, Poland, Romania and Slovakia. The species is found mainly in coniferous forests .

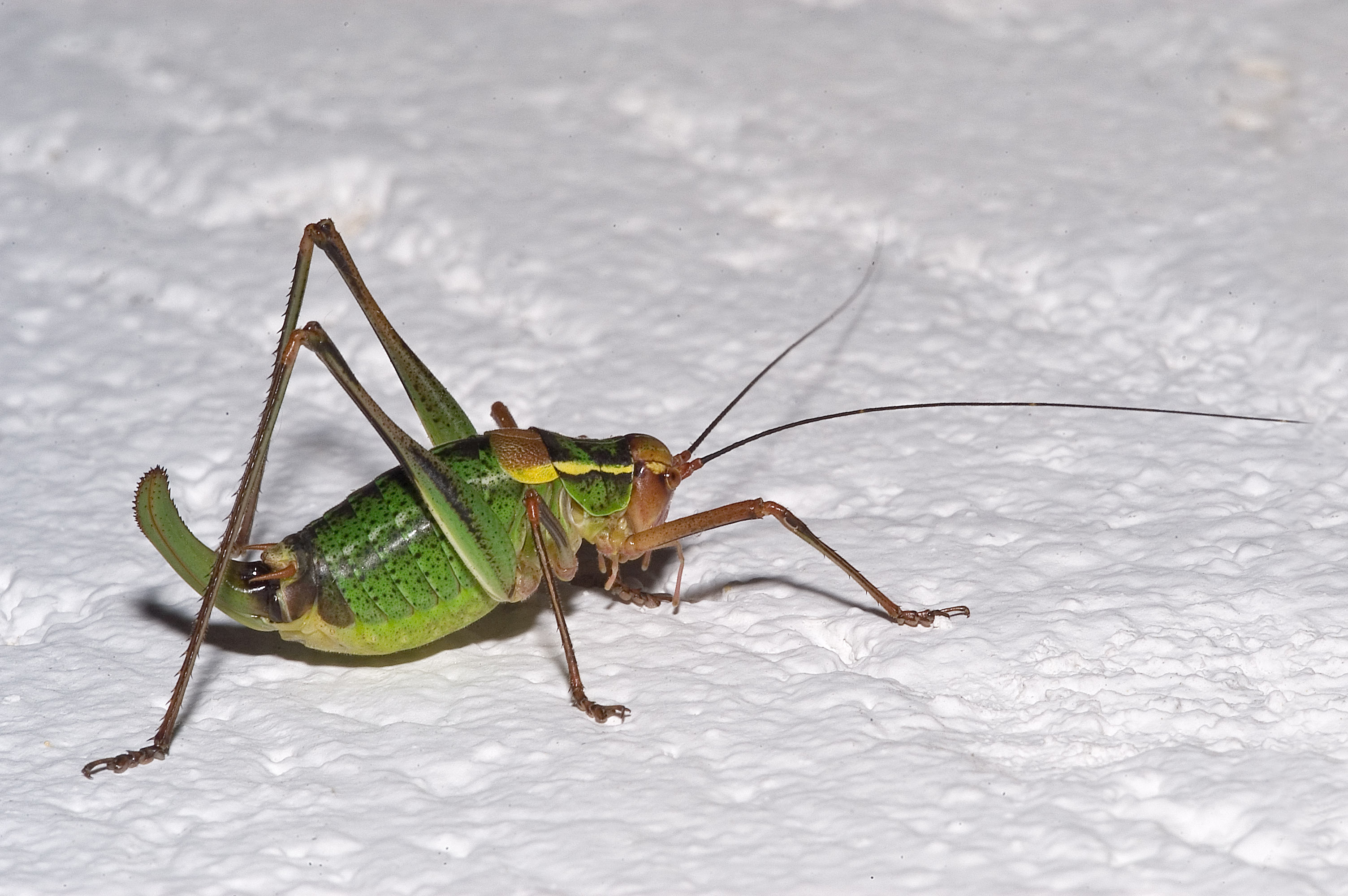

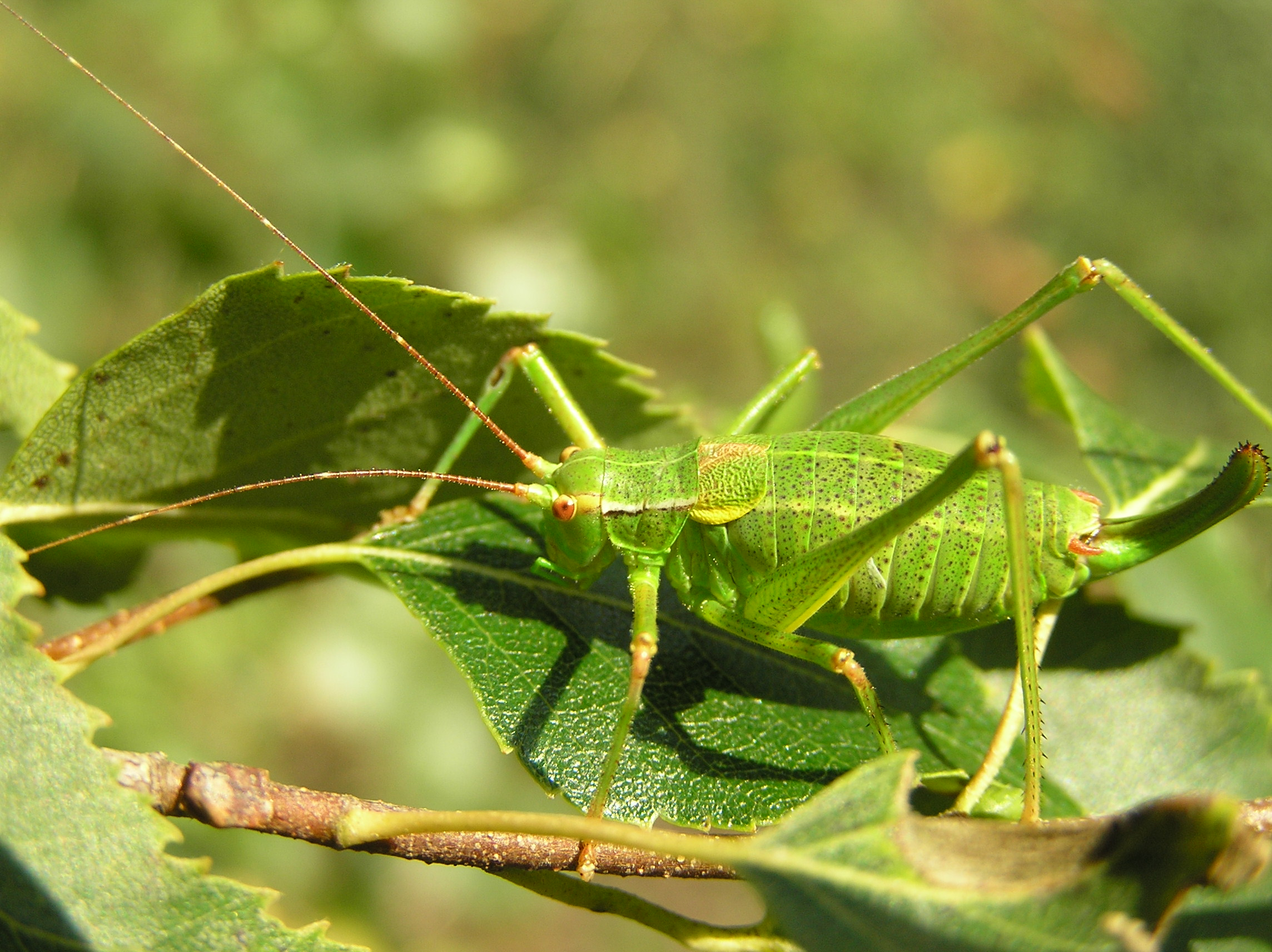

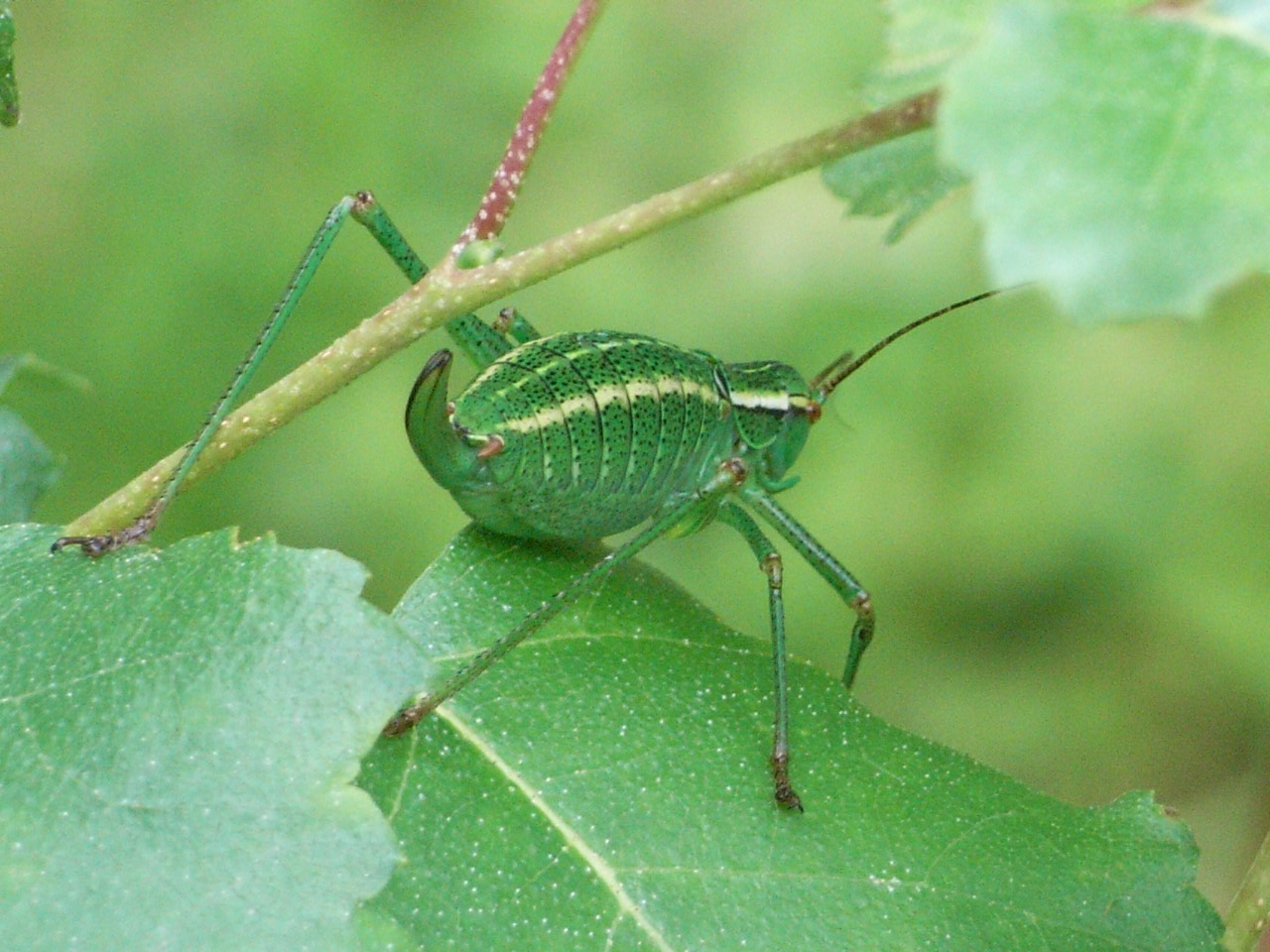

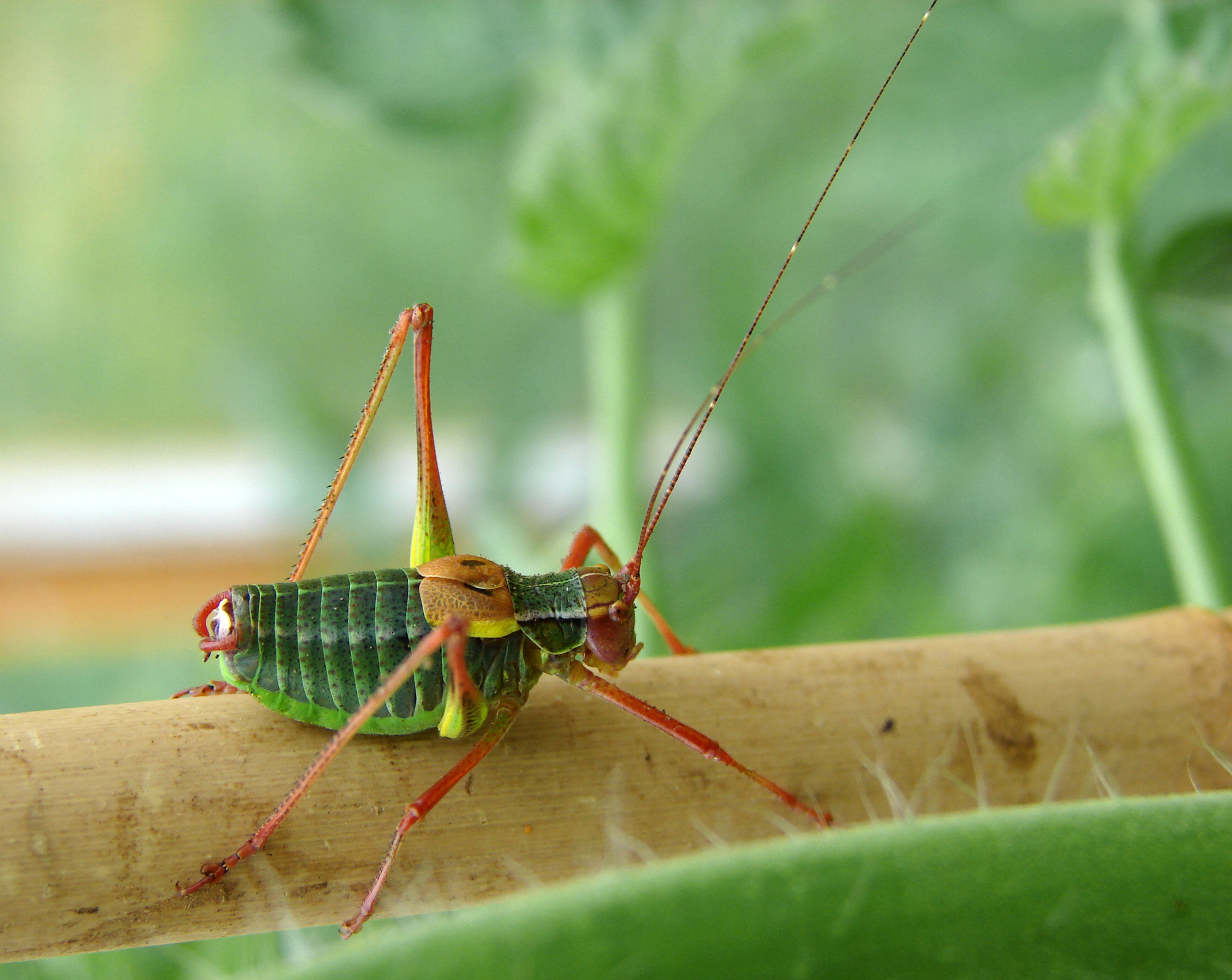

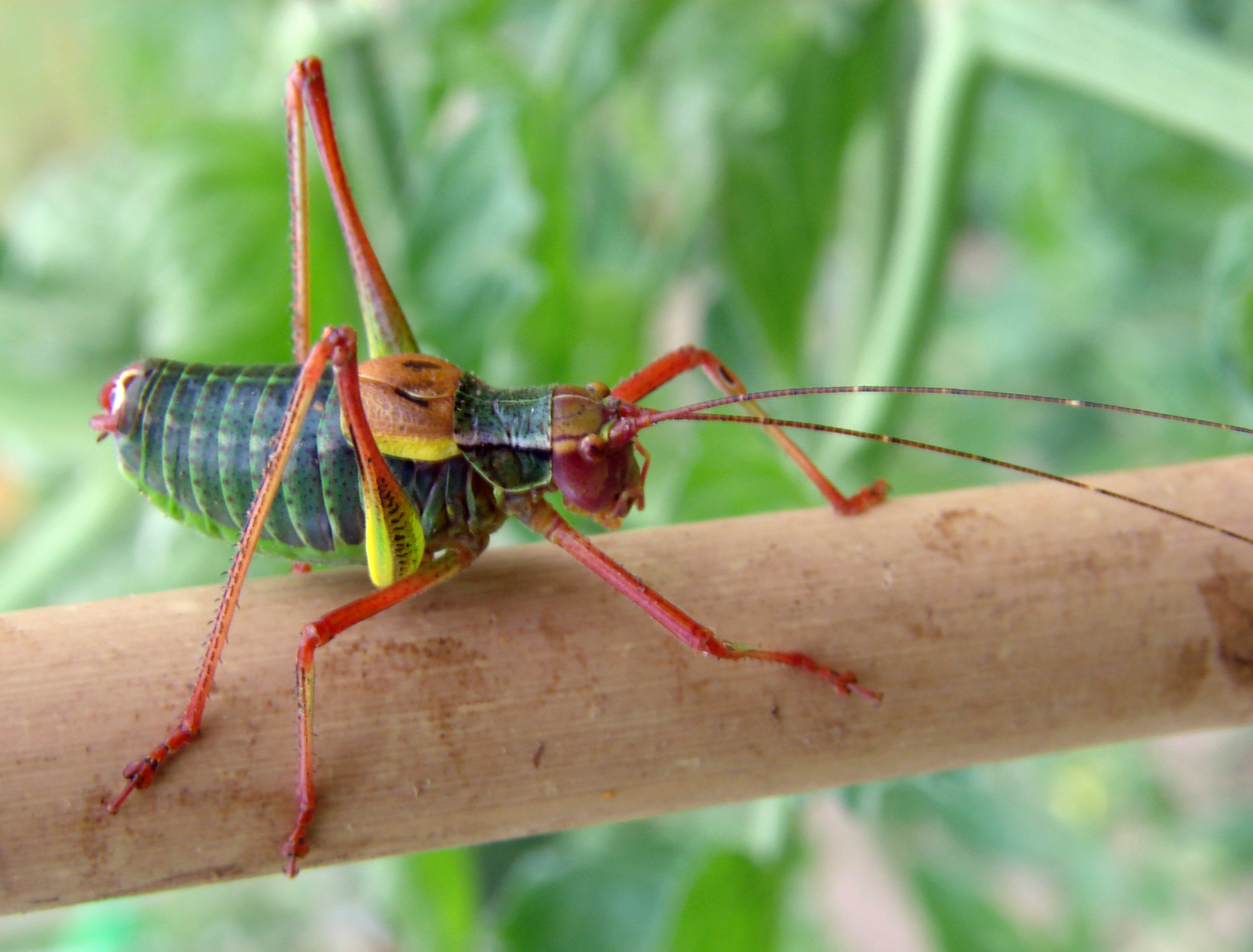

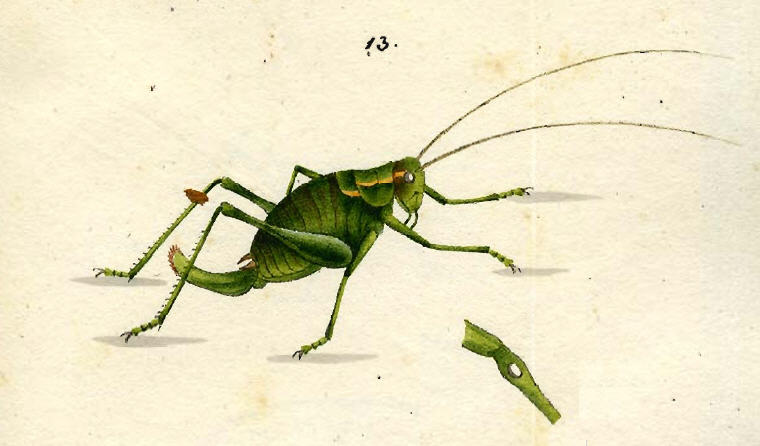
