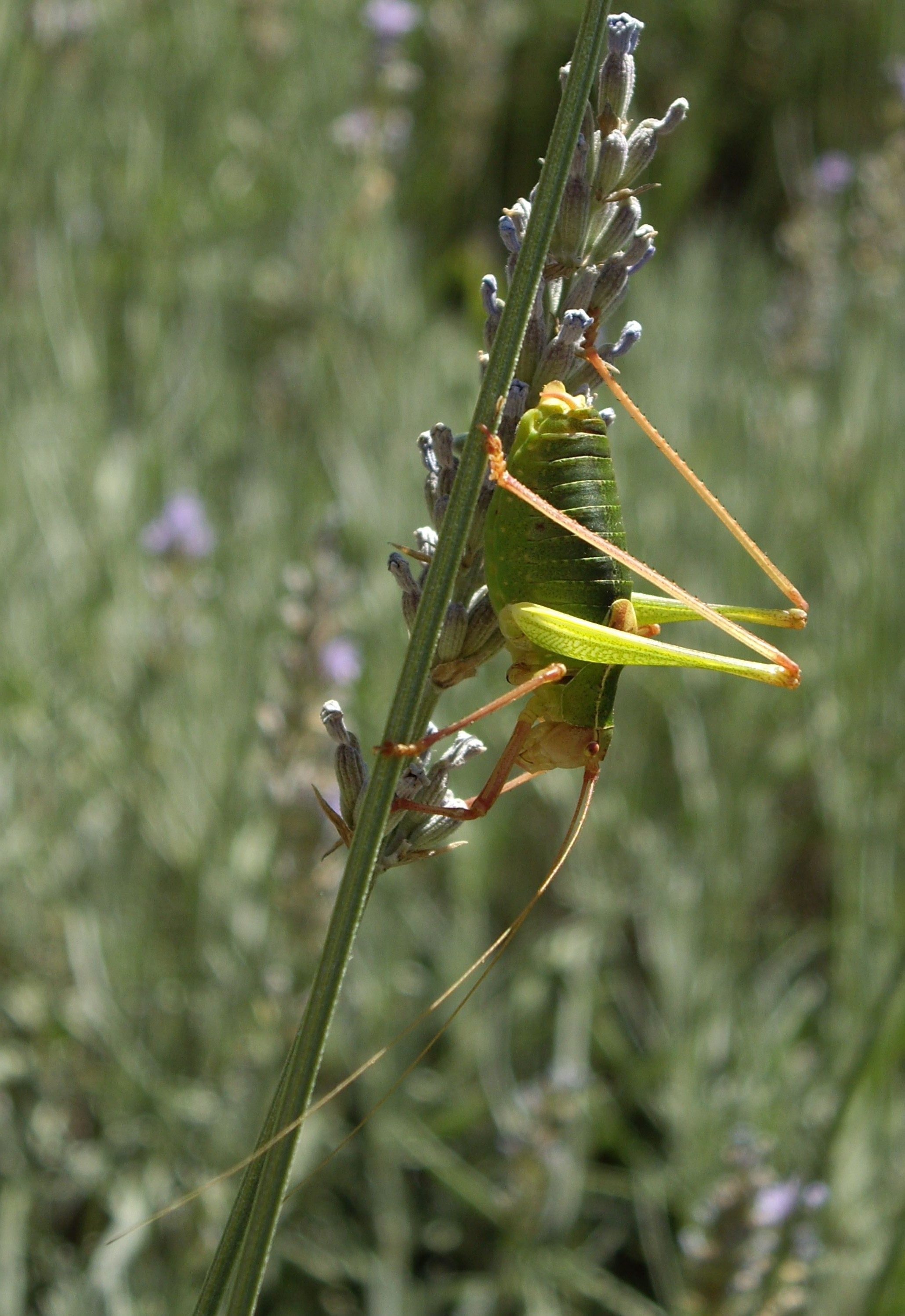
- Barbitistes fischeri male Italy

Scientific classification
- Domain: Eukaryota
- Kingdom: Animalia
- Phylum: Arthropoda
- Class: Insecta
- Order: Orthoptera
- Suborder: Ensifera
- Family: Tettigoniidae
- Subfamily: Phaneropterinae
- Genus: Barbitistes
- Species: B. fischeri

Binomial name
- Barbitistes fischeri (Yersin, 1854)

= Barbitistes fischeri =

Species of cricket-like animal

Barbitistes fischeri is a species of bush cricket belonging to the family Tettigoniidae subfamily Phaneropterinae. It is found in France, Italy, and Spain and up to the foothills of the Alps at altitudes of 1500 meters. There it occurs in sparse forests and forest edges. The imagines occur from June to August.
