= Jules Favre (naturalist) =

Swiss zoologist, mycologist and geologist

- Born: 6 November 1882; Le Locle
- Died: 22 January 1959 (aged 76); Geneva
- Scientific career
- Fields: zoology, botany, geology

Jules Favre (6 November 1882, Le Locle – 22 January 1959, Geneva) was a Swiss zoologist, mycologist and geologist. He was curator at the Natural History Museum of Geneva from 1915 to 1952.

He studied natural sciences at the Neuchâtel Academy, and in 1907, started work as an assistant at the Muséum d'Histoire Naturelle in Geneva, where he eventually became a curator of geology and paleontology. In 1952 he received an honorary degree from the University of Neuchâtel.

== Research and contributions ==
Jules Favre conducted extensive and methodical research on macrofungi, with particular emphasis on those associated with alder trees (Alnus species) in the Swiss National Park and its surrounding regions. His publications on macrofungi in Jurassian bogs (1948) and in the alpine and subalpine zones of the Swiss National Park (1955, 1960) are recognised as foundational works in mycology.

His 1955 monograph on alpine fungi in the Swiss National Park is considered the definitive reference source for information on arcto-alpine macrofungi. Favre's research significantly advanced understanding of fungal ecology in alpine environments, an area that had received limited scientific attention before his work. Through his meticulous documentation and analysis, Favre identified numerous ectomycorrhizal and saprobic fungi associated with Alnus viridis and A. incana in subalpine and montane zones. His ecological observations established clear correlations between specific fungi species and their host trees, demonstrating complex patterns of host specificity that had not previously been documented.

== Field methodology ==
Favre's approach to mycological research was characterised by systematic and thorough field investigations. Between 1941 and 1957, he conducted at least 76 documented excursions to alder stands within and adjacent to the Swiss National Park. His field work was concentrated primarily in August (44 trips) and September (21 trips), with fewer collections occurring in spring and early summer.

His research methodology integrated mycology with broader ecological principles. Favre consistently recognised fungi as heterotrophic organisms that form integral components of well-defined plant communities. He meticulously documented not only the fungal specimens themselves but also their plant associations, elevation data, and edaphic characteristics, providing contextual ecological information that was innovative for mycological research of that period. Particularly notable was his focused attention on a small stand of Alnus viridis in Val Sesvenna, which he visited on 19 separate occasions. This intensive sampling of a single location enabled him to document a remarkably comprehensive fungal diversity within a restricted habitat, demonstrating the value of repeated sampling at the same site across different seasons and years.

== Publications and legacy ==
Favre's published works represent substantial contributions to mycological knowledge. His 1960 catalogue documented 157 ectotrophic, saprobic and parasitic macrofungi species associated with alder trees in the Swiss National Park region. This comprehensive inventory included detailed information on fungal ecology, habitat preferences, and distribution patterns. Several new fungal taxa were originally described by Favre from his research sites, including Clitocybe alnetorum, Cortinarius atropusillus, Marasmius alniphilus, Mycena alnetorum, and Rhodocybe cuprea. These taxonomic contributions reflected his expertise in fungal identification and classification.

Beyond his taxonomic work, Favre's ecological approach to mycology was pioneering. He is recognised as one of the foremost early practitioners of mycoecology, the study of fungi within their ecological contexts. His emphasis on understanding fungi as components of broader ecological systems rather than as isolated organisms represented an important conceptual advance in mycological research methodology.

During his career, he was a recipient of the Prix Desmazières of the Académie des sciences of Paris and the Prix de la Ville de Genève. In 1927 he became a member of the Société linnéenne de Lyon (Linnean Society of Lyon).

=== Selected publications ===
Partial list:

- 1911. Description geologique des environs du Locle et de la Chaux-de-Fonds.
- 1913. Étienne Joukowsky, J. Favre. Monographie géologique et paléontologique du Salève (Haute Savoie).
- 1914. Carte du Salève (Haute-Savoie), 1/25.000. Dressée d'après des levés photogrammétriques et barométriques et des croquis pris sur place avec E. Joukowsky.
- 1927. Les mollusques post-glaciaires et actuels du bassin de Genève.
- 1935. Histoire malacologique du lac de Genève. In: Mémoires de la Société physique et d'Histoire naturelle de Genève.
- 1941. Les Pisidium du canton de Neuchatel. In: Bulletin de la société neuchateloise des sciences, T. 66.
- 1945. Études mycologiques faites au Parc national suisse.
- 1955. Les champignons supérieurs de la zone alpine du Parc national suisse. Ed. Nationalpark-Museum.
- 1960. Catalogue descriptif des champignons supérieurs de la zone subalpine du Parc national suisse.

Books about Jules Favre:

- 1959. "L'œuvre mycologique de Jules Favre", Lons-le-Saunier : M. Declume, 1959. by Henri Romagnesi, and in: Bulletin de la Société Mycologique de France 75, 1959, 418–426.

=== Archives and collections ===
Since 1985, Favre's complete set of field notebooks, microscopic observations, and original specimens have been preserved at the Conservatoire Botanique in Geneva. This archive has enabled subsequent researchers to access additional data such as precise collection dates, phenology observations, and fruiting behaviour information that were sometimes omitted from his published works.

The preservation of these primary research materials has allowed later mycologists to re-examine and extend Favre's findings, adding ecological and taxonomic information that continues to enhance understanding of alpine and subalpine fungal communities. His meticulously collected specimens and field notes remain valuable research resources for contemporary mycological studies.
