= Lazzaro Spallanzani =

Italian priest, biologist and physiologist (1729–1799)

Lazzaro Spallanzani FRS
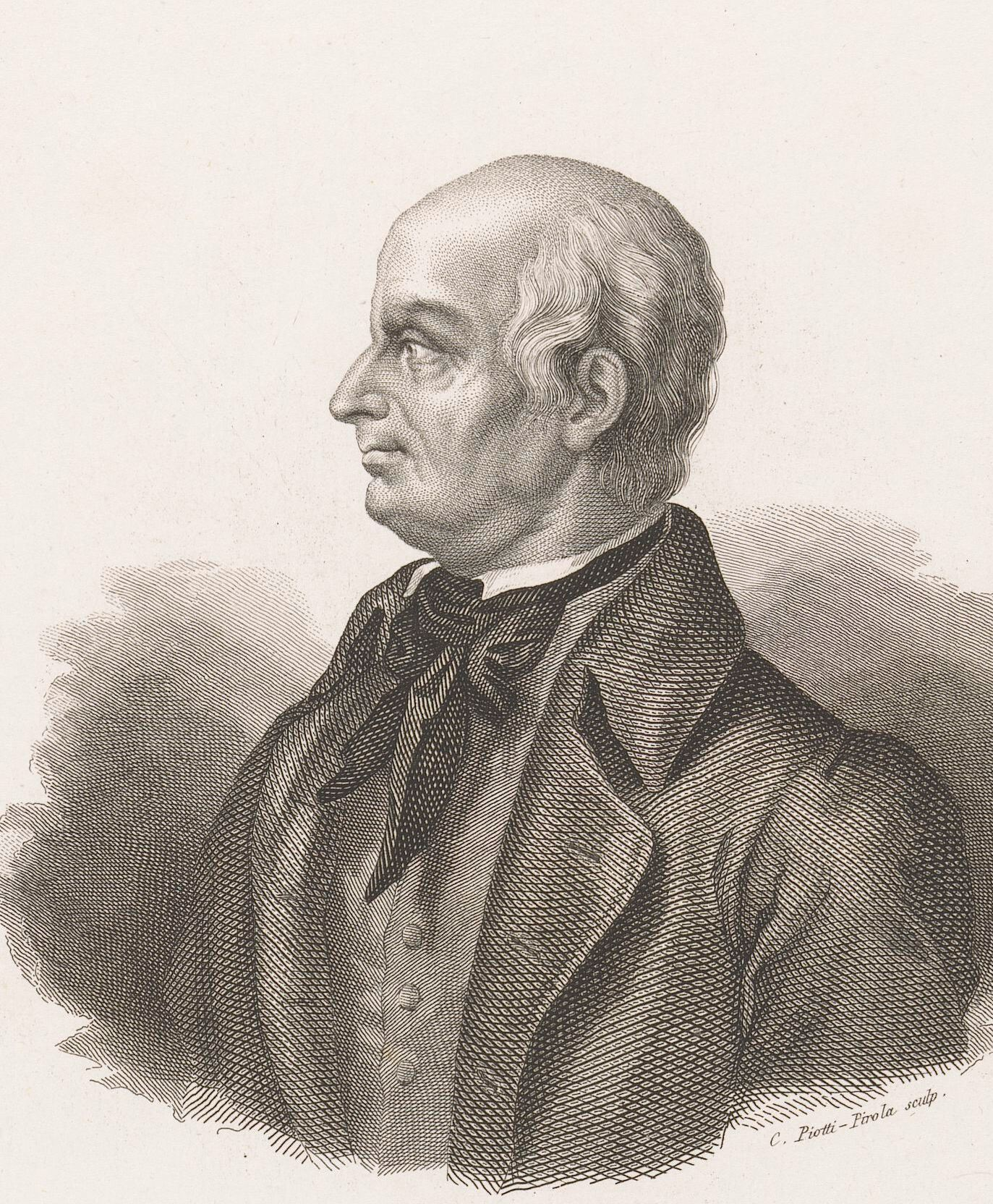
- Born: 12 January 1729; Scandiano, Duchy of Modena and Reggio
- Died: 11 February 1799 (aged 70); Pavia, French First Republic
- Education: University of Bologna
- Known for: Digestion; Animal fertilisation Discrediting spontaneous generation Animal echolocation
- Scientific career
- Fields: Biology
- Workplaces: University of Modena and Reggio Emilia; University of Pavia; University of Padua
- Author abbrev. (zoology): Spallanzani

Signature
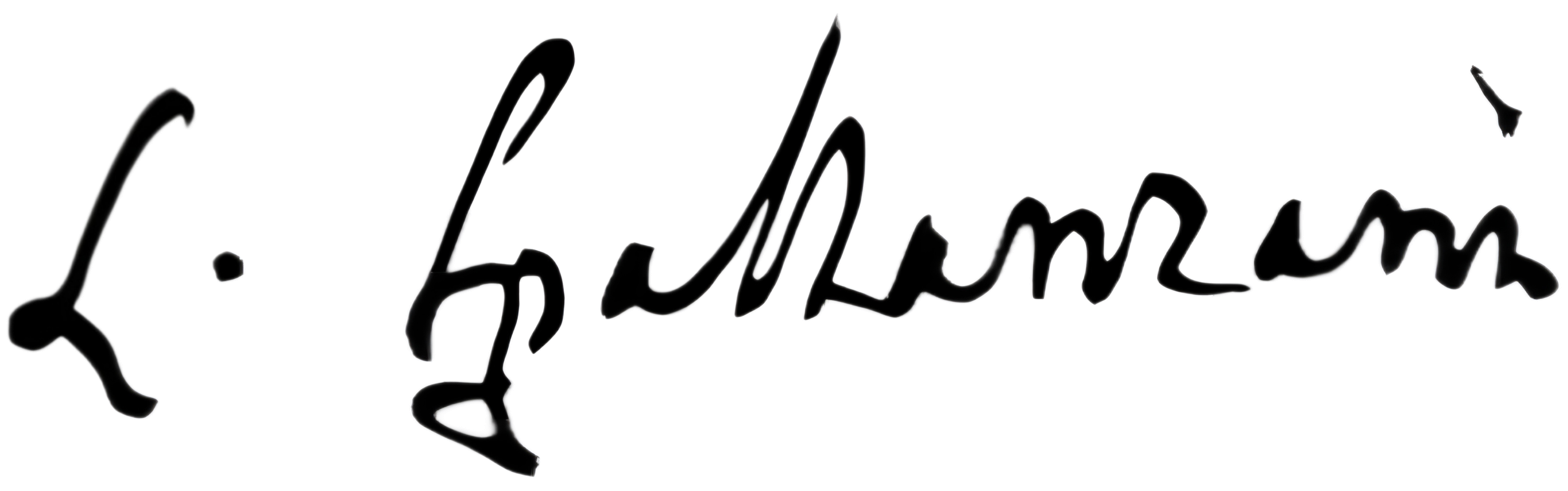

Lazzaro Spallanzani (Italian pronunciation: [ˈladdzaro spallanˈtsaːni]; 12 January 1729 – 11 February 1799) was an Italian Catholic priest (for which he was nicknamed Abbé Spallanzani), biologist and physiologist who made important contributions to the experimental study of bodily functions, animal reproduction, and animal echolocation. His research on biogenesis paved the way for the downfall of the theory of spontaneous generation, a prevailing idea at the time that organisms develop from inanimate matters, though the final death blow to the idea was dealt by French scientist Louis Pasteur a century later.

His most important works were summed up in his book Expériences pour servir a l'histoire de la génération des animaux et des plantes (Experiences to Serve to the History of the Generation of Animals and Plants), published in 1785. Among his contributions were experimental demonstrations of fertilisation between ova and spermatozoa, and in vitro fertilisation.

== Biography ==
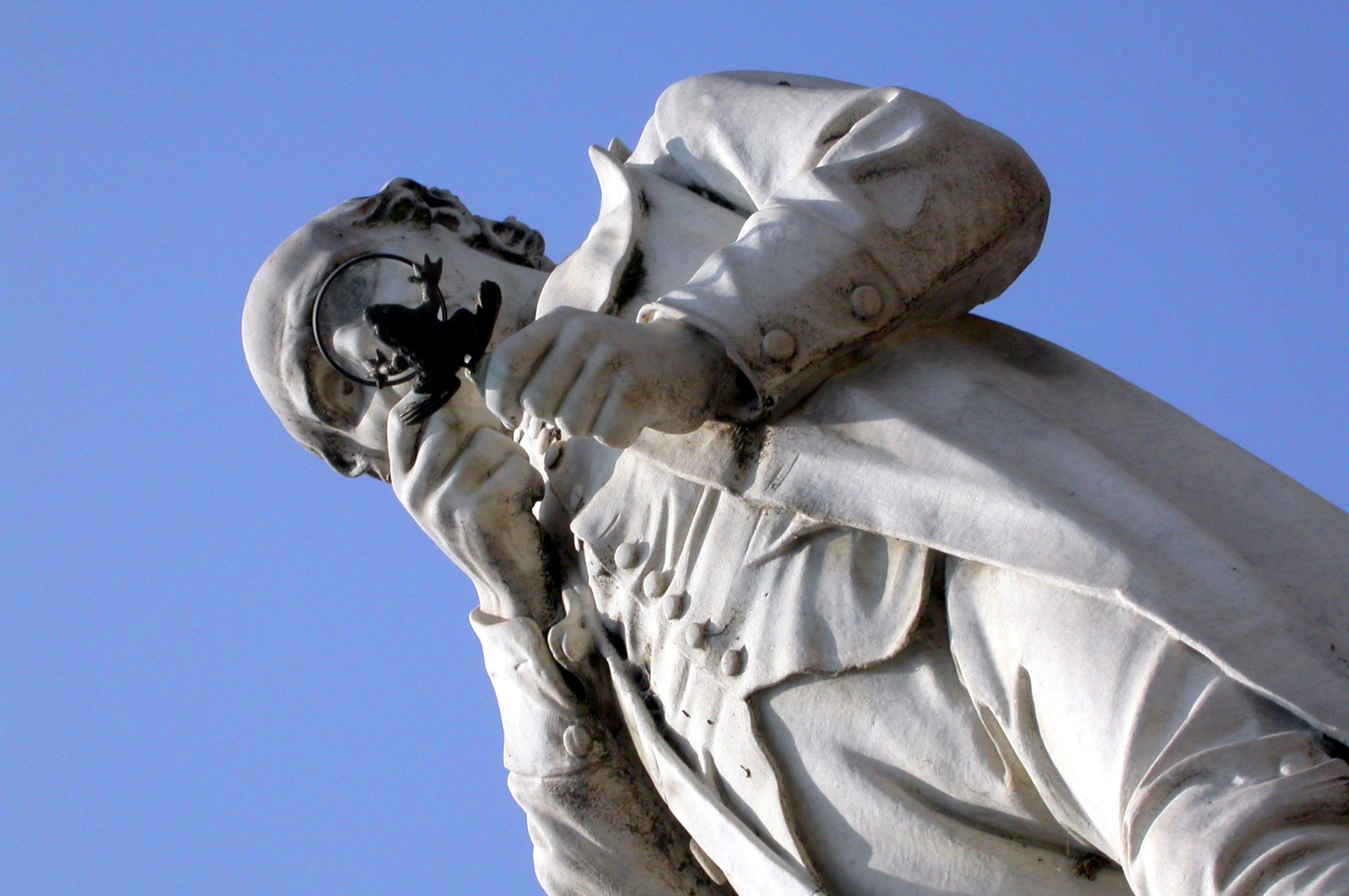
The statue of Spallanzani in Scandiano has him examining a frog through a magnifying glass.

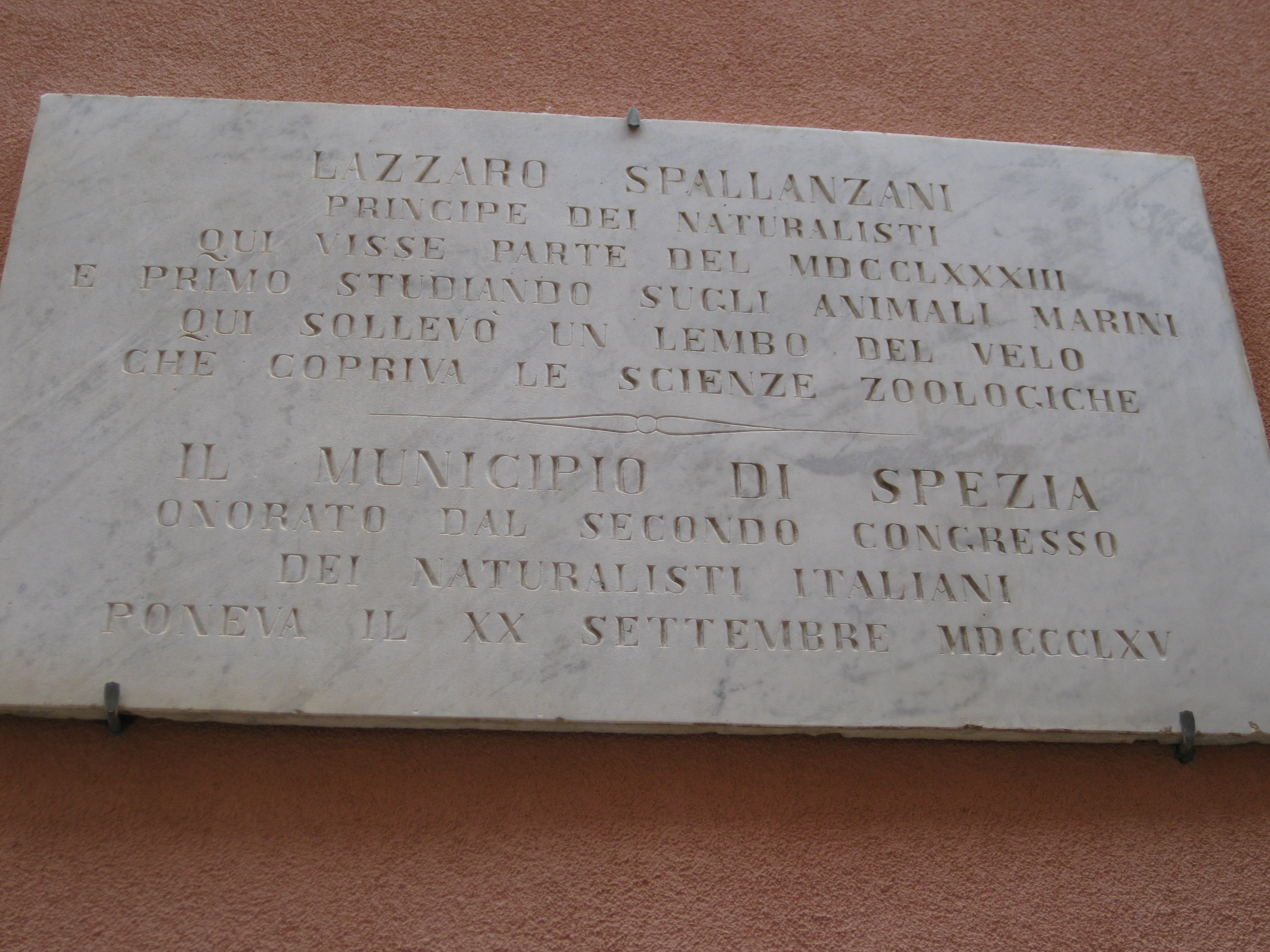
Plaque dedicated to Spallanzani in Portovenere, Italy

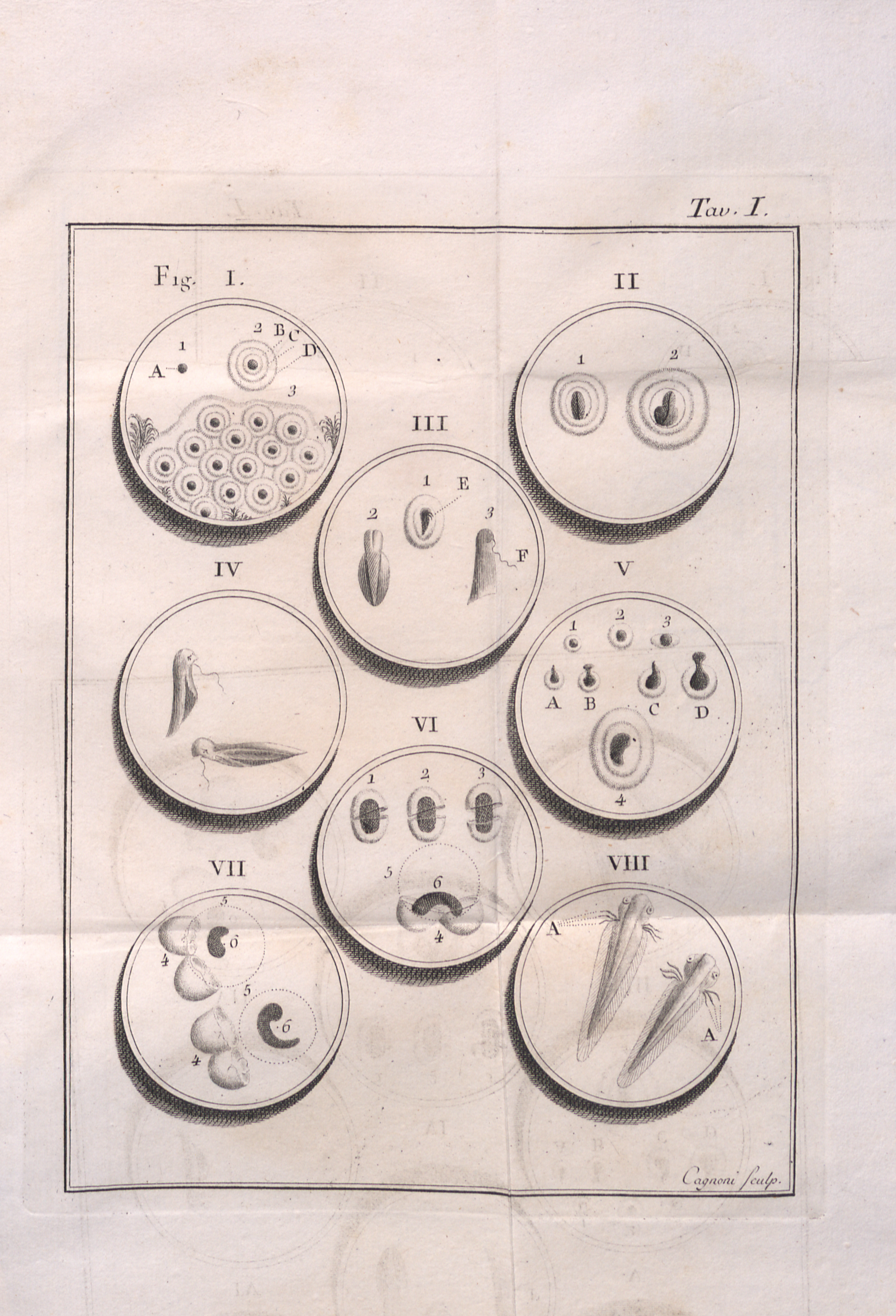
Dissertazioni di fisica animale e vegetabile, 1780

Spallanzani was born in Scandiano in the modern province of Reggio Emilia to Gianniccolo Spallanzani and Lucia Zigliani. His father, a lawyer by profession, was not impressed with young Spallanzani who spent more time with small animals than studies. With financial support from the Vallisnieri Foundation, his father enrolled him in the Jesuit Seminary at age 15. When he was asked to join the order, he declined. Persuaded by his father and with the help of Monsignor Castelvetro, the Bishop of Reggio, he studied law at the University of Bologna, which he gave up soon and turned to science. Here, his famous kinswoman, Laura Bassi, was a professor of physics and it is to her influence that his scientific impulse has been usually attributed. With her, he studied natural philosophy and mathematics, and gave also great attention to languages, both ancient and modern, but soon abandoned them. It took his good friend Antonio Vallisnieri Jr. to convince his father to drop law as a career and take up academics instead.

In 1754, at the age of 25, soon after he was ordained he became professor of logic, metaphysics and Greek in the University of Reggio. In 1763, he was moved to the University of Modena, where he continued to teach with great assiduity and success, but devoted his whole leisure to natural science. There he also served as a priest of the Congregation Beata Vergine and S. Carlo. He declined many offers from other Italian universities and from St Petersburg until 1768, when he accepted the invitation of Maria Theresa to the chair of natural history in the University of Pavia, which was then being reorganized. He also became director of the museum, which he greatly enriched by the collections of his many journeys along the shores of the Mediterranean Sea. In June 1768 Spallanzani was elected a Fellow of the Royal Society and in 1775 was elected a foreign member of the Royal Swedish Academy of Sciences.

In 1785 he was invited to University of Padua, but to retain his services his sovereign doubled his salary and allowed him leave of absence for a visit to Turkey, where he remained nearly a year and made many observations, among which may be noted those of a copper mine in Chalki and of an iron mine at Principi. His return home was almost a triumphal progress: at Vienna he was cordially received by Joseph II and on reaching Pavia he was met with acclamations outside the city gates by the students of the university. During the following year, his students exceeded five hundred. While he was travelling in the Balkans and to Constantinople, his integrity in the management of the museum was called in question (he was accused of the theft of specimens from the university's collection to add to his own cabinet of curiosities), with letters written across Europe to damage Spallanzani's reputation. A judicial investigation speedily cleared his honour to the satisfaction of some of his accusers. But Spallanzani got his revenge on his principal accuser, Giovanni Antonio Scopoli, by preparing a fake specimen of a new "species". When Scopoli published the remarkable specimen, Spallanzani revealed the joke, resulting in wide ridicule and humiliation.

In 1796, Spallanzani received an offer for professor at the National Museum of Natural History, France in Paris, but declined due to his age. He died from bladder cancer on 12 February 1799, in Pavia. After his death, his bladder was removed for study by his colleagues, after which it was placed on public display in a museum in Pavia, where it remains to this day.

Spallanzani gained fame among his contemporaries as an avid traveller, collector, and teacher who embraced controversial ideas. His letters document his close relationships with many scholars and philosophers, such as Georges-Louis Leclerc, Comte de Buffon, Lavoisier, and Voltaire. Alongside his research into animal biology and physiology, Spallanzani's work also contributed to the foundations of modern volcanology, meteorology and he clarified the mechanics of stone skipping, debunking the earlier belief that it was caused by water’s elasticity.

== Scientific contributions ==
=== Spontaneous generation ===
Spallanzani's first scientific work was in 1765 Saggio di osservazioni microscopiche concernenti il sistema della generazione de' signori di Needham, e Buffon (Essay on microscopic observations regarding the generation system of Messrs. Needham and Buffon) which was the first systematic rebuttal of the theory of the spontaneous generation. At the time, the microscope was already available to researchers, and using it, the proponents of the theory, Pierre Louis Moreau de Maupertuis, Buffon and John Needham, came to the conclusion that there is a life-generating force inherent to certain kinds of inorganic matter that causes living microbes to create themselves if given sufficient time. Spallanzani's experiment showed that it is not an inherent feature of matter and that it can be destroyed by an hour of boiling. As the microbes did not re-appear as long as the material was hermetically sealed, he proposed that microbes move through the air and that they could be killed through boiling. Needham argued that experiments destroyed the "vegetative force" that was required for spontaneous generation to occur. Spallanzani paved the way for research by Louis Pasteur, who defeated the theory of spontaneous generation almost a century later.

=== Digestion ===
In his work Dissertationi di fisica animale e vegetale (Dissertation on the physiology of animals and vegetables, in 2 volumes, 1780), Spallanzani was the first to explain the process of digestion in animals. Here he first interpreted the process of digestion, which he proved to be no mere mechanical process of trituration – that is, of grinding up the food – but one of actual chemical solution, taking place primarily in the stomach, by the action of the gastric juice.

=== Reproduction ===
Spallanzani described animal (mammal) reproduction in his Experiencias Para Servir a La Historia de La Generación De Animales y Plantas (1786). He was the first to show that fertilisation requires both spermatozoa and an ovum. He was the first to perform in vitro fertilization, with frogs, and an artificial insemination, using a dog. Spallanzani showed that some animals, especially newts, can regenerate some parts of their body if injured or surgically removed.

In spite of his scientific background, Spallanzani endorsed preformationism, an idea that organisms develop from their own miniature selves; e.g. animals from minute animals, animalcules. In 1784, he performed a filtration experiment in which he successfully separated the seminal fluid of frogs – a liquid portion and a gelatinous animalcule (spermatozoa) portion. But then he assumed that it was the liquid part which could induce fertilisation. A staunch ovist, he believed that animal form was already developed in the eggs and fertilisation by semen was only an activation for growth.

=== Echolocation ===
Spallanzani is also famous for extensive experiments in 1793 on how bats could fly at night to detect objects (including prey) and avoid obstacles, where he concluded that bats do not use their eyes for navigation, but some other sense. He was originally inspired by his observation that tamed barn owl flew properly at night under a dim-lit candle, but struck against the wall when the candle was put out. He managed to capture three wild bats in Scandiano, and performed a similar experiment, on which he wrote (on 20 August 1793):

Having seen this, the candle was taken away, and for my eyes like for those of my brother and cousins we were in complete darkness. Yet the animals continued to fly around as before and never struck against obstacles, nor did they fall down, as would have happened with a night-bird. Thus a place which we believe to be completely dark is not at all so, because bats certainly could not see without light.

A few days later he took two bats and covered their eyes with an opaque disc made of birdlime. To his astonishment, both bats flew completely normally. He went further by surgically removing the eyeballs of one bat, which he observed as:

[The bat] flew quickly, following the different subterranean pathways from one end to the other with the speed and sureness of an uninjured bat. More than once the animal landed on the walls and at the roof of the sotterranei and finally it landed in a hole in the ceiling two inches wide, hiding itself there immediately. My astonishment at this bat which absolutely could see although deprived of its eyes is inexpressible.

He concluded that bats do not need vision for navigation; although he failed to find the reason. At the time other scientists were sceptical and ridiculed his findings. A contemporary of Spallanzani, the Swiss physician and naturalist Louis Jurine, learned of Spallanzani's experiments, investigated the possible mechanism of bat navigation. He discovered that bat flight was disoriented when their ears were plugged. But Spallanzani did not believe that it was about hearing since bats flew very silently. He repeated his experiments by using improved ear plugs using turpentine, wax, pomatum or tinder mixed with water, to find that blinded bats could not navigate without hearing. He was still suspicious that deafness alone was the cause of disoriented flight and that hearing was vital that he conducted some rather painful experiments such as burning and removing the external ear, and piercing through the inner ear. After these operations, he became convinced that hearing was fundamental to normal bat flight, upon which he noted:

This experiment, which is so decisively in favour of hearing ... has been repeated by me with equal results both in blinded bats and in seeing one.

By then he was too convinced that he suggested the ear was an organ of navigation, writing:

The experiments of M. Professor Jurine, confirming by many examples those which I have done, and varied in many ways, establish without doubt the influence of the ear in the flight of blinded bats. Can it then still be said that ... [for bats] their ears rather than their eyes serve to direct them in flight?

His pupil, Paolo Spadoni (1764-1826), also published observations on the topic.

The exact scientific principle was discovered only in 1938 by two American biologists Donald Griffin and Robert Galambos.

=== Parthenogenesis ===
In his Dissertazioni di fisica animale e vegetabile (Vol. 2), Spallanzani related a series of experiment showing, according to him, a phenomenon akin to parthenogenesis with the prime example of Cannabis sativa. While he did not coin the term, and his hypothesis on Cannabis was rebutted by Guglielmo Gasparrini at the end of the 19th century, his work was influential in the development of the concept of parthenogenesis.

His work also documents an early cultivation of "sinsemilla" type Cannabis in Emilia-Romagna in 1767.

=== Fossils ===
Spallanzani studied the formation and origin of marine fossils found in distant regions of the sea and over the ridge mountains in some regions of Europe, which resulted in the publication in 1755 of a small dissertation, "Dissertazione sopra i corpi marino-montani then presented at the meeting the Accademia degli Ipocondriaci di Reggio Emilia". Although aligned to one of the trends of his time, which attributed the occurrence of marine fossils on mountains to the natural movement of the sea, not the universal flood, Spallanzani developed his own hypothesis, based on the dynamics of the forces that changed the state of the Earth after God's creation.

A few years later, Spallanzani published reports about trips he made to Portovenere, Cerigo Island, and Two Sicilies, addressing important issues such as the discovery of fossil shells within volcanic rocks, human fossils, and the existence of fossils of extinct species. His concern with fossils witnesses how, in the style of the eighteenth century, Spallanzani integrated studies of the three kingdoms of nature.

=== Other works ===
Spallanzani studied and made important descriptions on blood circulation and respiration. In 1777, he gave the name Tardigrada (from Latin meaning "slow-moving") to the phylum of minute extremophile animals also called water bears.

In 1788 he visited Vesuvius and the volcanoes of the Lipari Islands and Mount Etna in Sicily. He visited the latter along with Carlo Gemmellaro. He embodied the results of his research in a large work (Viaggi alle due Sicilie ed in alcune parti dell'Appennino), published four years later.

Much of his collections, which he kept at the end of his life in his house in Scandiano, were purchased by the city of Reggio Emilia in 1799. They are now on display inside the Palazzo dei Musei in two rooms denominated the Museo Spallanzani.

=== Publications ===
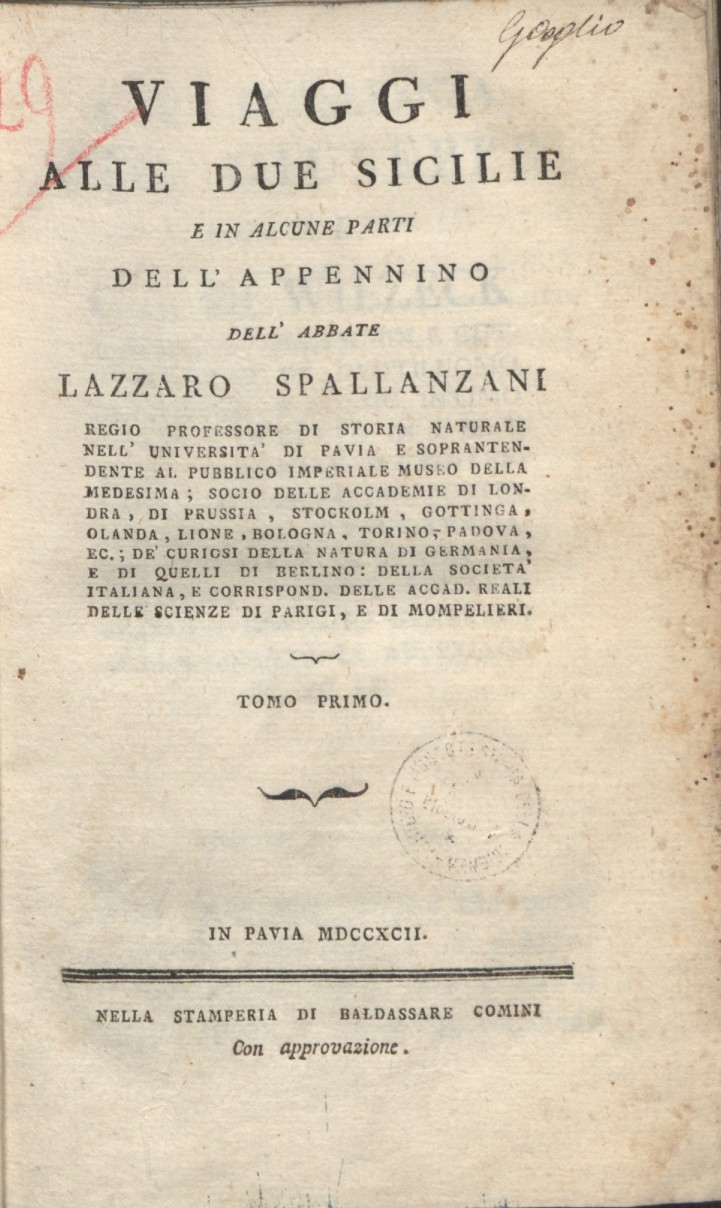
Viaggi alle Due Sicilie e in alcune parti dell'Appennino, 1792

- Saggio di osservazioni microscopiche concernenti il sistema della generazione de' signori di Needham e Buffon (in Italian). Modena: eredi Bartolomeo Soliani (2.). 1765.
- Nuove ricerche sulle scoperte microscopiche (in French). Paris: Jacques Lacombe. 1769.
- Opuscoli di fisica animale e vegetabile (in Italian). Vol. 1. Modena: Società tipografica. 1776.
- Opuscoli di fisica animale e vegetabile (in Italian). Vol. 2. Modena: Società tipografica. 1776.
- Dissertazioni di fisica animale e vegetabile (in Italian). Vol. 1. Venezia: Giammaria Bassaglia. 1782.
- Dissertazioni di fisica animale e vegetabile (in Italian). Vol. 2. Venezia: Giammaria Bassaglia. 1782.
- Expériences pour servir a l'histoire de la génération des animaux et des plantes (in French). Genève: Barthelemi Chirol. 1785.
- Viaggi alle Due Sicilie e in alcune parti dell'Appennino (in Italian). Vol. 1. Pavia: Baldassare Comino. 1792.
- Viaggi alle Due Sicilie e in alcune parti dell'Appennino (in Italian). Vol. 2. Pavia: Baldassare Comino. 1792.
- Viaggi alle Due Sicilie e in alcune parti dell'Appennino (in Italian). Vol. 3. Pavia: Baldassare Comino. 1793.
- Viaggi alle Due Sicilie e in alcune parti dell'Appennino (in Italian). Vol. 4. Pavia: Baldassare Comino. 1793.
- Viaggi alle Due Sicilie e in alcune parti dell'Appennino (in Italian). Vol. 5. Pavia: Baldassare Comino. 1795.
- Lettere sopra il sospetto di un nuovo senso nei pipistrelli (in Italian). Torino: Stamperia reale. 1794.
- Chimico esame degli esperimenti del sig. Gottling (in Italian). Modena: Società tipografica. 1796.
- Memorie su la respirazione (in Italian). Vol. 1. Milano: Annesio Nobili. 1803.
- Memorie su la respirazione (in Italian). Vol. 2. Milano: Annesio Nobili. 1803.

== Honours ==
Spallanzani was elected Fellow of the Royal Society of London. He was a member of the Prussian Academy of Sciences, the Royal Swedish Academy of Sciences, and the Göttingen Academy of Sciences and Humanities.

== See also ==
- List of Roman Catholic scientist-clerics
- Charles Jurine

== Bibliography ==
=== General ===
- Paul de Kruif, Microbe Hunters (2002 reprint) ISBN 978-0-15-602777-9; de Kruif, Paul (1926). "II Spallanzani: Microbes Must Have Parents!". Microbe Hunters. Blue Ribbon Books. New York: Harcourt Brace & Company Inc. pp. 25–56.
- Nordenskiöld, E. P. 1935 [Spallanzani, L.] Hist. of Biol. 247–248
- Rostand, J. 1997, Lazzaro Spallanzani e le origini della biologia sperimentale, Torino, Einaudi.
- Prestes, Maria Elice Brzezinski; Faria, Frederico Felipe de Almeida (December 2011). "Lazzaro Spallanzani e os fósseis: das observações em viagens naturalísticas ao ensino de história natural" [Lazzaro Spallanzani and fossils: from a naturalist's travel observations to the teaching of natural history]. História, Ciências, Saúde-Manguinhos (in Portuguese). 18 (4): 1005–1020. doi:10.1590/s0104-59702011000400003. PMID 22281956.

=== Work on insects ===
- Conci, Cesare; Poggi, Roberto (1996). "Iconography of Italian Entomologists, with essential biographical data". Memorie della Società entomologica italiana. 75: 159–382. OCLC 889566579.
- Gibelli, V. 1971 L. Spallanzani. Pavia.
- Lhoste, J. 1987 Les entomologistes français. 1750–1950. INRA (Institut National de la Recherche Agronomique), Paris.
- Osborn, H. 1946 Fragments of Entomological History Including Some Personal Recollections of Men and Events. Columbus, Ohio, Published by the Author.
- Osborn, H. 1952 A Brief History of Entomology Including Time of Demosthenes and Aristotle to Modern Times with over Five Hundred Portraits.Columbus, Ohio, The Spahr & Glenn Company.
