= Pinacoteca Claudio Ridolfi, Corinaldo =

Art gallery in Marche, Italy

Coordinates: 43.6491°N 13.0477°E

The Pinacoteca Claudio Ridolfi is the civic art gallery of the town of Corinaldo, province of Ancona, region of Marche, Italy. Located in the former-convent of the Augustinian padri eremitani, it mainly displays sacred paintings from prior centuries.

== Structure ==
The art gallery and museum were opened in 1996 with a restoration in 2012. Most of the artworks, both paintings and sculptural come from suppressed religious institutions including the former Chiesa dall'Addolorata, Santi Lorenzo e Ippolito, Santa Maria di Piazza, San Rocco, and San Pietro Apostolo. It includes works by Ercole Ramazzani, Gaspare Gasparini, Claudio Ridolfi, Domenico Peruzzini, and Giuseppe Marchesi. The galleries also include contemporary works including a large collection of works by Nori de’ Nobili (1902-1968), who also now has a museum since 2012 in Trecastelli.
