= Paolo Spadoni =

Italian zoologist and geologist (1764–1826)

Paolo Spadoni (1764 – 16 September 1826) was an Italian zoologist and geologist.

== Biography ==
He was born in Corinaldo in the province of Ancona to an aristocratic family and went to study at the University of Bologna. From there he moved to Pavia to study under Lazzaro Spallanzani. He gained the appointment to the professorship of zoology, mineralogy (geology), botany and natural history at the University of Macerata. He traveled extensively through the peninsula and was granted honorary membership to many of the scientific academies. He helped design the botanical gardens around the Villa Cesarini Duranti in Corinaldo. Spadoni died in his native land. A eulogy of Spadoni by the doctor Francesco Pucinotti was published in 1830 in Macerata.

== Works ==
Among his works are texts and letters to journals:

- Lettere oderperiche sulle monagne Ligustiche (1783)
- Osservazione sopra un'iride lunare
- Osservazioni mineralovulcaniche sull'antico Lazio (1802)
- Dissertazione epistolare sul volo di pippistrelli acieccati e sul passagio de'veggente (Dissertation about the flight of blinded bats, also an interest of Spallanzani)
- Lettera sopra alcune ossa fossili (1808)
- Di alcune zanne elefantine fossile (1810) (Of some fossil elephant tusks and other fossils. found near Perugia)
- Peregrinazione alle gessaie di Sant'Angiolo e San Gaudenzio (Travel to the chalk deposits near Senigallia in the province of Ancona)
- Xilologia Picena applicata alle arti
