= Corinaldo =

- Comune
- Comune di Corinaldo
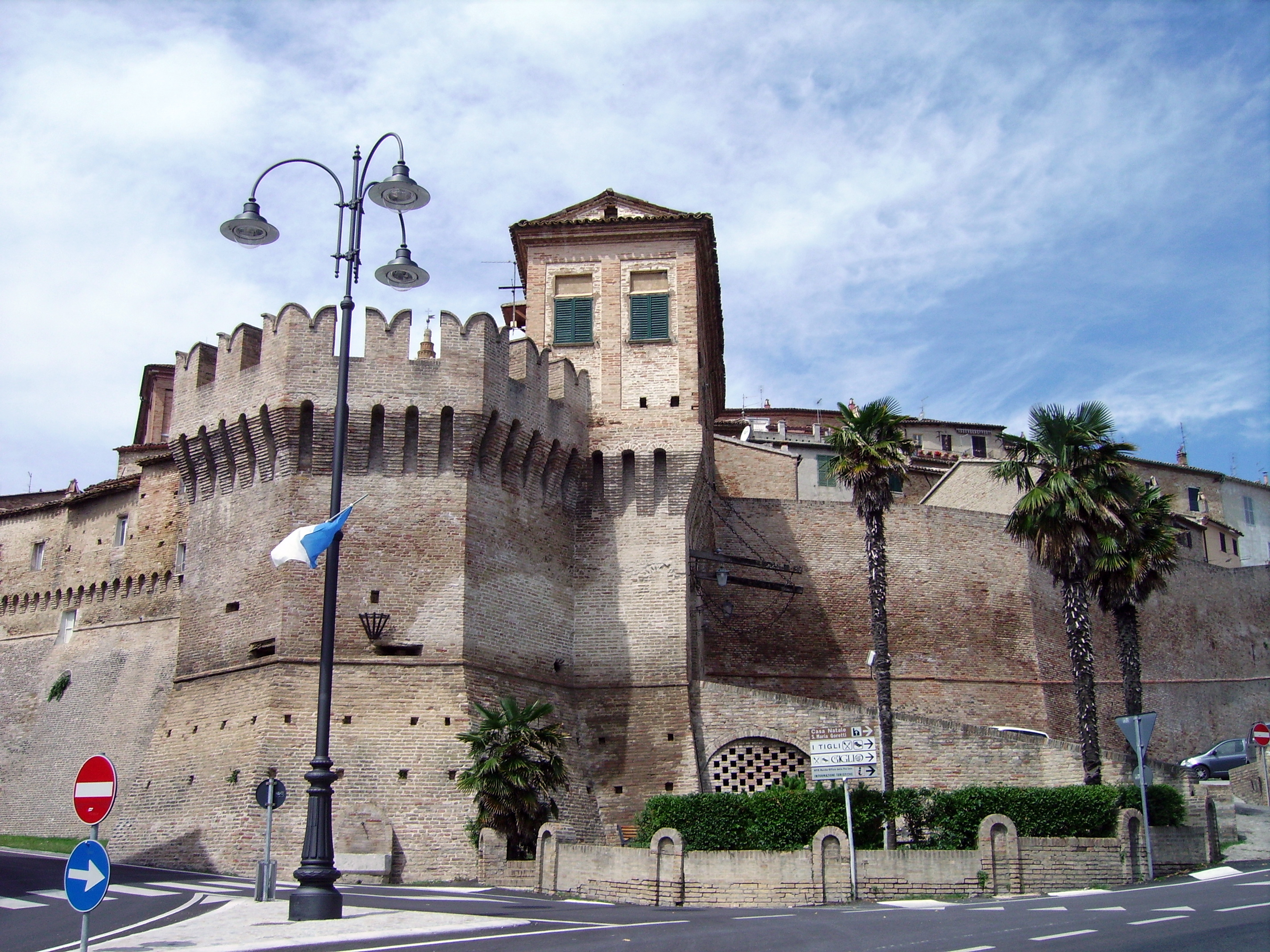
- Walls of Corinaldo
- Motto: Cineribus orta combusta revixi
- Location within Italy Location within Marche
- Coordinates: 43°38′57″N 13°2′54″E
- Country: Italy
- Region: Marche
- Province: Ancona (AN)
- Frazioni: Cesano, Madonna del Piano, Nevola, San Bartolo, San Domenico, Santa Maria, Sant'Isidoro, San Vincenzo, Ville

Government
  - Mayor: Matteo Principi

Area
  - Total: 48.32 km^{2} (18.66 sq mi)
- Elevation: 203 m (666 ft)

Population (31 December 2017)
  - Total: 4,949
  - Density: 102.4/km^{2} (265.3/sq mi)
- Demonym: Corinaldesi
- Time zone: UTC+1 (CET)
  - Summer (DST): UTC+2 (CEST)
- Postal code: 60013
- Dialing code: 071
- Patron saint: St. Anne
- Saint day: July 26
- Website: Official website

Corinaldo is a town and comune (municipality) in the Province of Ancona, within the Marche region of central Italy. It is home to well-preserved 14th-century walls, and was the birthplace of Saint Maria Goretti; it is also the site of a Halloween festival held every October, as well as being a wine country where Verdicchio is produced.

It is one of I Borghi più belli d'Italia ("The most beautiful villages of Italy").

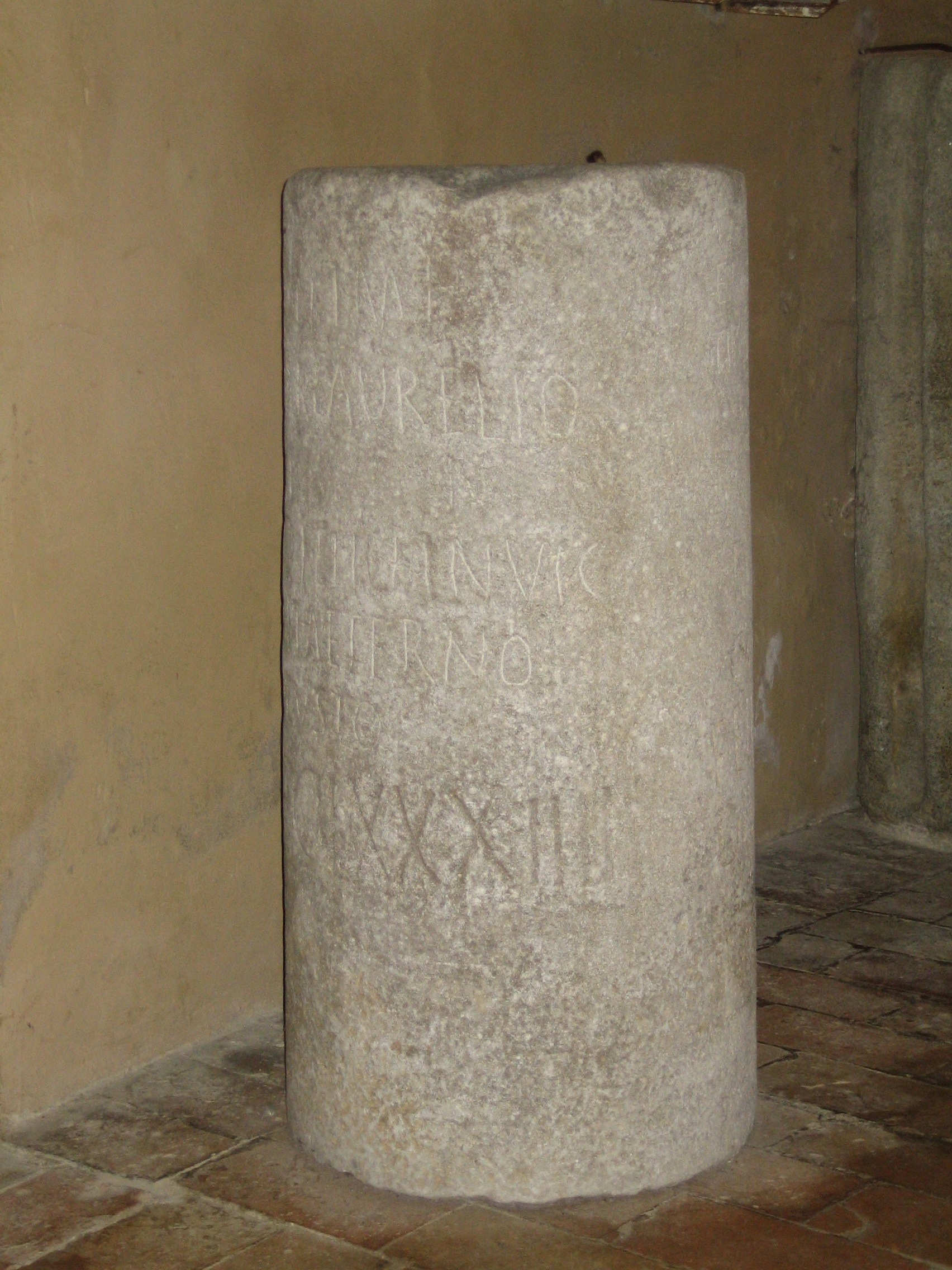
Miliario di Corinaldo

== Main sights ==
=== The walls ===
The walls of Corinaldo are 912 metres (2,992 ft) long and considered the most impressive medieval walls in the Marche region. They are the symbol of the city of Corinaldo. However, the current walls are not the original ones. Indeed, as a result of the papal reconquest of the town, the papal army of Innocent VI, led by Galeotto I Malatesta, razed Corinaldo to the ground on August 18, 1360. Only seven years later Pope Urban V granted authorization for the reconstruction. The walls were built with the typical dovetail battlements that they still retain today. Between 1484 and 1490 they were extended towards the south with the Renaissance addition, more linear and characterized by corbels, erected by the famous Sienese military architect Francesco Di Giorgio Martini, until 1490. The imposing walls preserve all the typical elements of the Medieval period such as murder holes, embrasures, loopholes, moats and towers telling the tales of glorious battles of the past. Following the external path of the walls, it is possible to visit 3 of the 4 towers near the castle entrances. The three entrances are: Porta Nova (New Gate), Porta del Mercato (Market Gate), Porta San Giovanni (Saint John's Gate).

=== The polenta well ===
Located at the center of La Piaggia (a suggestive staircase of 104 steps) there is a well. The actual well was rebuilt in the 80s in the same place where the original one was, built in the 15th century by the tyrant of Corinaldo, Antonello Accattabriga. The original one was used as aqueduct and destroyed at the end of the 19th century, because it was no longer necessary. The well is linked with a traditional folk story: a long time ago, a man was climbing La Piaggia staircase street with a sack of corn flour on his shoulders. Once he reached the well, he put the sack on the well's edge to catch his breath but the sack tumbled down into it. The poor man tried to save it and went down into the well himself. Starting from this point of the story, the oral tradition over time created many different versions of what happened next: the people watching the scene started to say that he was eating polenta in the well, while someone else thought that the polenta needed a few sausages to be more tasteful and others went to the well. This rumor was probably fostered by the military enemies of Corinaldo to discredit the citizens.

=== Municipal theater ===
"Carlo Goldoni" Municipal Theater was built between 1861 and 1869 to replace the old and no longer adequate "Teatro del Sol Nascente" (Theater of the Rising Sun), built in the distant years 1736–1752 on a design by Angelo Birza from Fabriano. The current structure was designed by Alessandro Pasqui of Florence, but the engineers Francesco Fellini and Achille Buffoni also intervened on his project.

At the end of the works, the new theater was very spacious and functional. According to Quagliani's design, an ingenious device was also prepared capable of making the stalls mobile, which was lowered on the occasion of theatrical performances and raised to create a single stage with the stage for dance parties and masked balls. After the 2006 restoration it definitively loses all its gadgets, from the elevation of the stalls to the stage machinery.

Various characters, companies and musical formations that have taken place over time on the Goldoni stage. Today it hosts residences, musical productions, rich theater seasons, theater reviews for children and amateur companies throughout the year.

=== The fig cannon ===
The fig cannon is another popular folk tradition belonging to Corinaldo's citizens: the rivalry between Corinaldo and Montenovo (old name for Ostra Vetere) had been long-standing. Since the citizens of Corinaldo had long desired to win this rivalry, they had an ingenious idea. They used a trunk of fig, and they made a cannon out of this wood, which is very fragile. The day they shot with the cannon, many people crowded onto the city walls to witness the fall of Montenovo. The seven most courageous citizen held the cannon while the commander lit the fuse. There was a tremendous boom and when the smoke faded away, the seven were fallen dead. The commander then exclaimed: "If seven people died here, just imagine how many died in Montenovo!". A reconstruction of the fig cannon can be visited inside the town hall building.

=== Museums ===
The town art museum is the Pinacoteca Claudio Ridolfi.

== Twin towns ==
- Arcore, Italy
- Nettuno, Italy
- San Benedetto dei Marsi, Italy

== Notable people ==
- Paolo Spadoni (1764–1826), Italian zoologist and geologist
