= Natural History Museum of Geneva =

Natural history museum in Geneva, Switzerland

- Muséum d'histoire naturelle de Genève

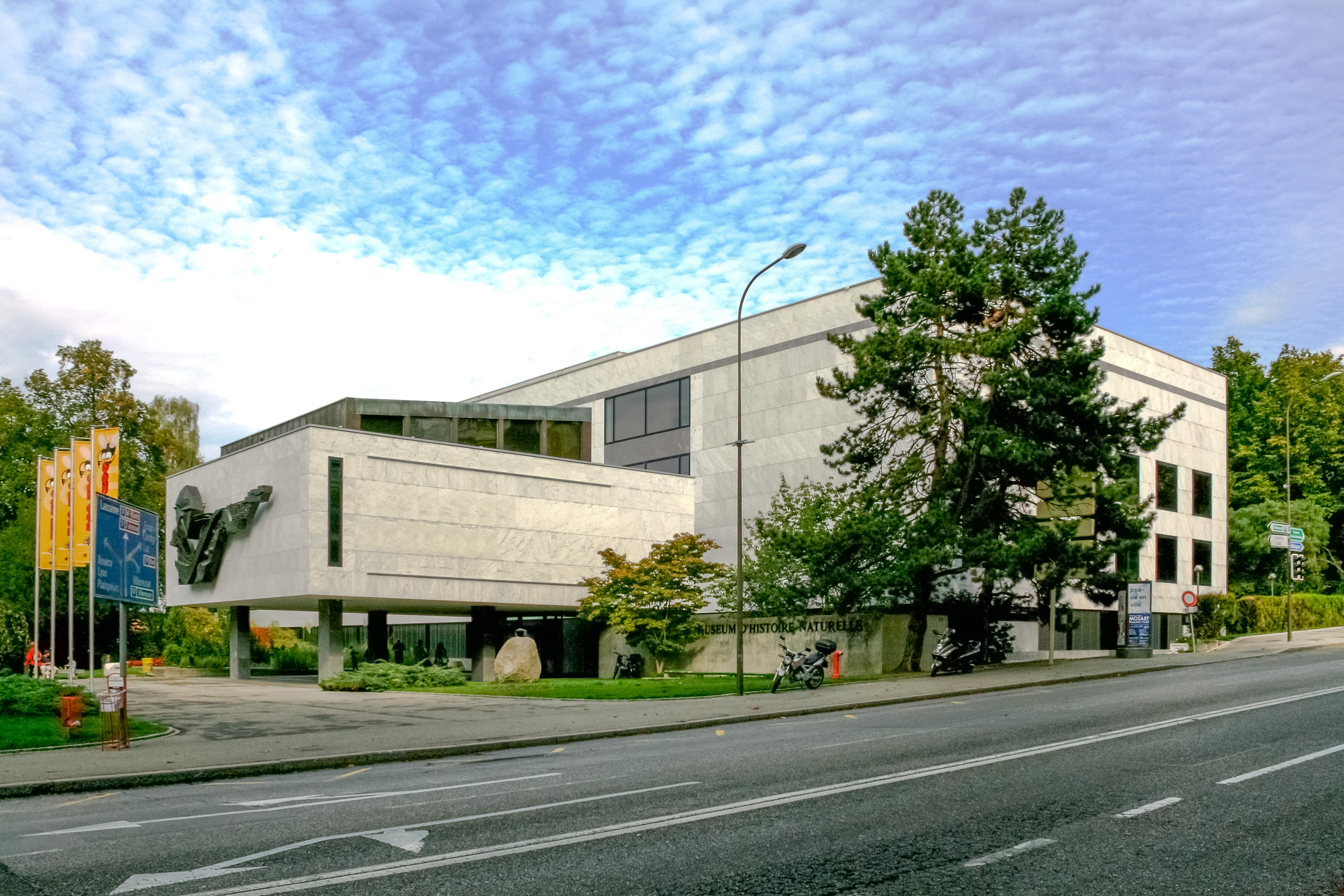
- Front façade of the museum after restoration
- Established: 9 March 1820; 206 years ago
- Location: Route de Malagnou 1 Geneva, GE 1208; Switzerland
- Coordinates: 46°11′58″N 6°9′29″E
- Type: Natural history museum
- Collection size: 15 million specimens
- Visitors: 300'000 per year
- Director: Arnaud Maeder
- Public transit access: Geneva City Bus: Lines 1, 5, 8 and 25 stop Muséum; Geneva City Tramway: stop Villereuse
- Website: mhn.ch

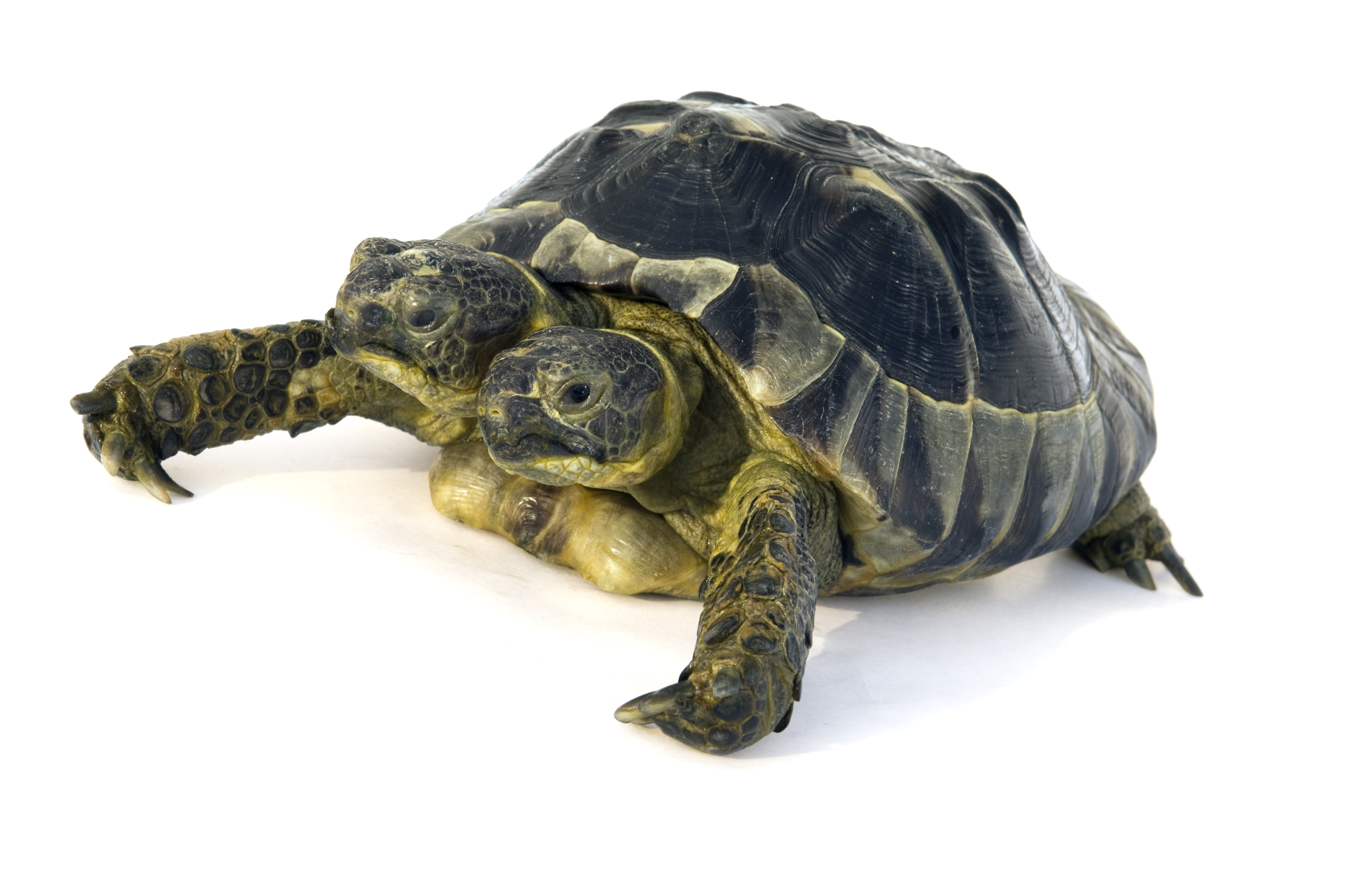
The two headed tortoise Janus in 2008.

The Natural History Museum of Geneva (French: Muséum d'histoire naturelle de Genève [myzeɔm distwaʁ natyʁɛl də ʒənɛv]; MHNG) is a natural history museum in Geneva, Switzerland. It is the largest natural history museum in Switzerland and one of the ten largest in Europe. The museum is home to more than 15 million specimens of animals, rocks, and minerals from around the world, and is a centre of scientific research, conservation of natural and historical heritage, exhibitions, and the dissemination of knowledge. Its collections, exhibited over four floors, represent nearly half of Switzerland's natural history collections.

Originating at the end of the 18th century, the institution underwent several relocations before moving to its present building in Malagnou Park. The museum's collections include important scientific material associated with Geneva naturalists, and are continually expanded by field missions and research work. The museum also maintains a scientific library, has published the Revue suisse de Zoologie since 1893, and is known for exhibiting the two-headed tortoise Janus.

Like other publicly funded municipal museums in Geneva, the Natural History Museum of Geneva offers free access to its permanent collections. The museum is part of Muséum Genève, an institution of the City of Geneva within the Department of Culture and Digital Transition.

Since 1 January 2024, the museum has been closed to the public for renovation and extension works.

== Collections ==
Louis Jurine’s collections of Hymenoptera, Coleoptera, Lepidoptera and Hemiptera are held by the museum.

Other displays include a collection of intricate glass models of invertebrates by Leopold and Rudolf Blaschka and a living specimen of a two headed tortoise named Janus. The tortoise is considered the mascot of the museum and is one of their main attractions.

== Notable people who worked for the museum ==
- Aloïs Humbert, naturalist and paleontologist, curator since 1852
- Auguste Louis Brot, malacologist, curator and researcher (1855-1896)
- Emil Frey-Gessner, entomologist, conservator of the entomological collections from 1872
- Émile Dottrens, scientific assistant for zoology
- François Jules Pictet de la Rive, curator of paleontological collections
- Henri Louis Frédéric de Saussure, member of the managing committee
- Jules Favre, curator (1915-1952)
- Perceval de Loriol, paleontologist and stratigraphist, associated with the museum for over 40 years
- Peter J. Schwendinger, curator
- Pierre Revilliod, curator and researcher

Collections of a number of prominent scientists are held in the museum.
