= Émile Dottrens =

Swiss zoologist and nature conservationist

Émile Dottrens (21 July 1900 – 29 September 1990) was a Swiss zoologist and nature conservationist. He became a scientific assistant for zoology at the Natural History Museum of Geneva in 1942 and was the director of that museum from 1953 to 1969. He wrote several articles about the Swiss freshwater fish species from the genus Coregonus. He has worked for the IUCN, for the Swiss nature conservation organisation Pro Natura and at the Council of Europe. He was the president of the International Commission for the Protection of the Alps (CIPRA) from 1960 to 1968. In addition he was a member of the Swiss Academy of Sciences and the Société de Physique et d'Histoire Naturelle de Genève.

== Publications ==
- Emile Dottrens (editor): Le grand livre de la pêche et des poissons. 2 volumes, 1952 (in French)
- Emile Dottrens: Batraciens et Reptiles d'Europe, 1963 (in French)
- Emile Dottrens: Sur le Lavaret du lac du Bourget Arch, Si. 3,. fasc. 3, 1950 (scientific article) (in French)
- Émile Dottrens (1955). "Acclimatation et hybridation de Corégones". Revue suisse de Zoologie (in French). 62: 101–118. ISSN 0035-418X. Wikidata Q47440246.
- Émile Dottrens (April 1959). "Systématiques des Corégones de l'Europe occidentale, basée sur une étude biométrique". Revue suisse de Zoologie (in French). 66 (1): 1–66. ISSN 0035-418X. Wikidata Q47444594.
- Émile Dottrens; Archibald Quartier (December 1949). "Les Corégones du lac de Neuchâtel. Étude biométrique". Revue suisse de Zoologie (in French). 56 (4): 689–730. ISSN 0035-418X. Wikidata Q47445232.
