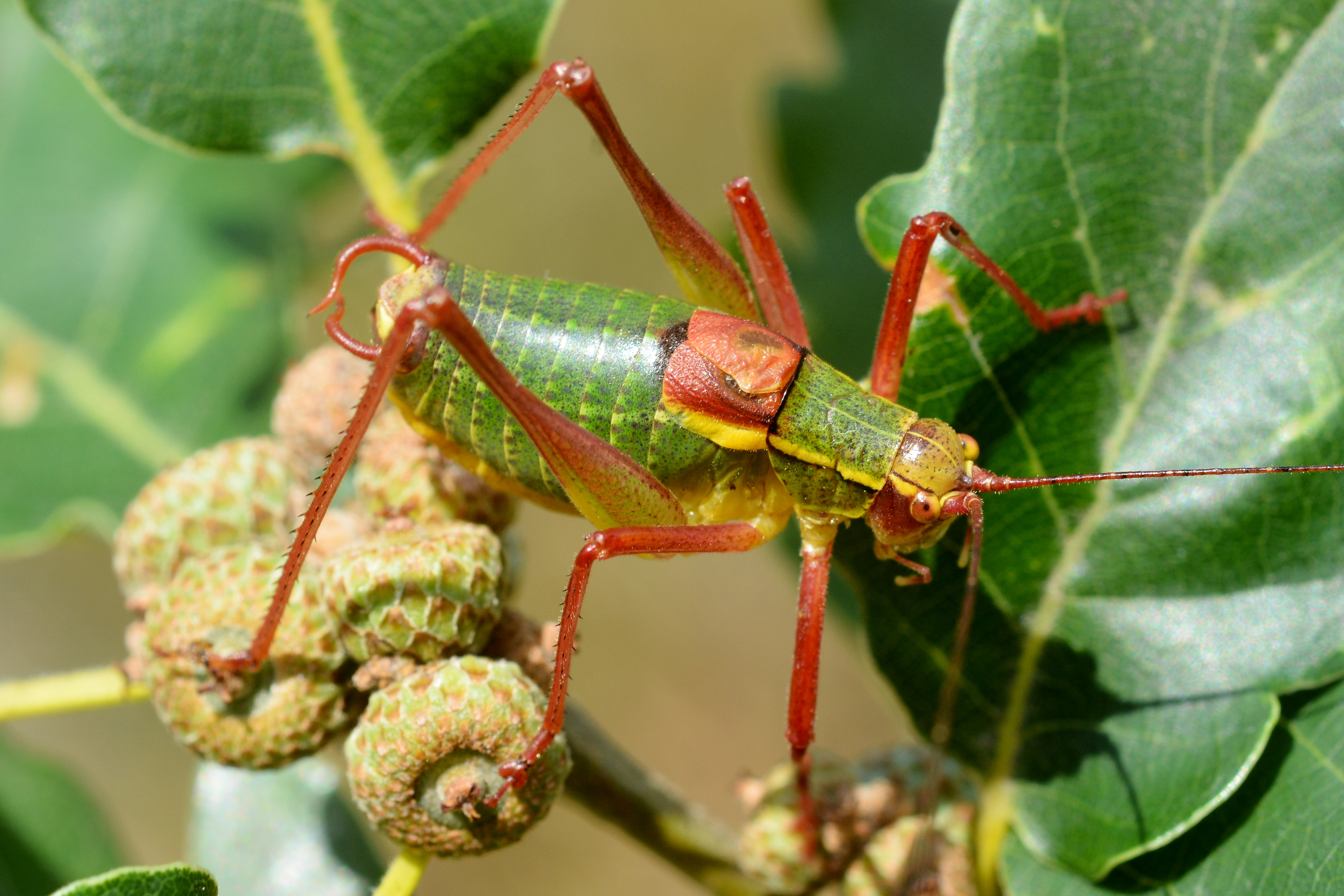
- Barbitistes serricauda male

Conservation status
- Least Concern (IUCN 3.1)

Scientific classification
- Kingdom: Animalia
- Phylum: Arthropoda
- Class: Insecta
- Order: Orthoptera
- Suborder: Ensifera
- Family: Tettigoniidae
- Subfamily: Phaneropterinae
- Genus: Barbitistes
- Species: B. serricauda

Binomial name
- Barbitistes serricauda (Fabricius, 1798)
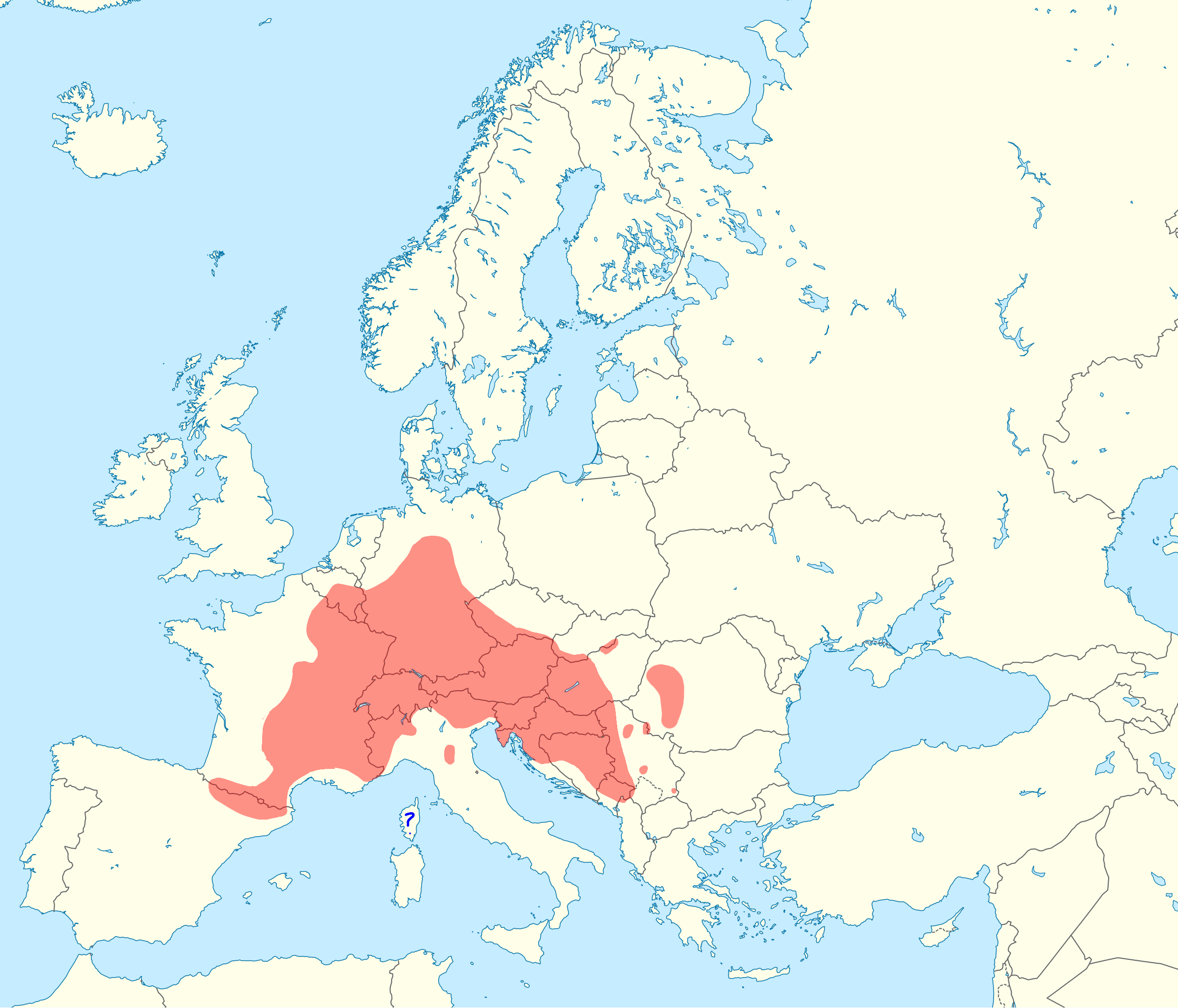

= Barbitistes serricauda =

Species of cricket-like animal

Close-Up of a Barbitistes serricauda

Barbitistes serricauda, also known as the common saw bush cricket, is a species belonging to the family Tettigoniidae subfamily Phaneropterinae. It is found in most of Europe. The imagines can be found from July to September on sunny forest edges and shrubs. They are mostly nocturnal.

== Distribution ==
This species is present in Spain, Andorra, France, Belgium, Luxembourg, Germany, Switzerland, Liechtenstein, Italy, Austria, Czech Republic, Slovenia, Hungary, Croatia, Bosnia and Hercegovina, Montenegro, Serbia and Romania.However, it may also be present in Slovakia and Albania, but there were no confirmed records from these countries.
