= Fera (band) =

- Origin: Vancouver, British Columbia Canada
- Genres: Pop rock, Alternative country
- Years active: 2000–2015
- Past members: Courtney Fera; Stephanie Fera
- Website: feramusic.com (defunct)

Fera is a Canadian pop rock/singer-songwriter duo composed of twin sisters Courtney and Stephanie Fera. Over the past ten years Fera has recorded three albums: The Music Room (2005) – produced by Paul Airey (Michael Bublé); Familiar Feeling (2007) – produced by CCMA award-winner Tom McKillip (Aaron Pritchett, One More Girl); and a 2009 self-titled EP, produced by McKillip and Paul Shatto (The Higgins).

== Biography ==
Born and raised in suburban Vancouver, British Columbia, the songwriting sisters grew up in a musical household--their father was a musician and there was a recording studio in the family home. The sisters grew up playing guitar, drums and harmonica, and were immersed in country music. They studied music production at The British Columbia Institute of Technology and started their professional career in 2000, playing a wide range of music, from country, to rock, to alternative and pop. Early on, they played the Golden Spike Days Festival and the Merritt Mountain Music Festival. Their song "Fairytales" won the Songwriter Universe magazine 'Best Song Of The Month' contest for January 2006.

After releasing two singles to Canadian country radio in 2008, Fera had opened for Prairie Oyster, Lisa Brokop, and One More Girl.

Fera's songwriting led to an opportunity at the 2008 CCMA Music Conference, where "Fairytales" was signed to OLE Media Management (now Anthem Records). Their co-writing adventures led to a writing trip to Nashville and writing sessions with Jessie Farrell, One More Girl, Kathleen Higgins (of The Higgins), Exit This Side, and The Matinee. Fera has been nominated several years in a row for the British Columbia Country Music Awards 'Group or Duo', 'Roots Artist', 'SOCAN Song of the Year', and 'Rising Star'. In 2009, they appeared as guests on the One More Girl album Big Sky. In 2010, the song "Tornado" was in the Top 20 of local radio station "The Shore 104.3" 'Sounds of Summer Contest'.

As of 2022, the sisters were in season two of their podcast Fridge Buzz with The Fera Twins.

== Discography ==
- The Music Room (2005), Independent
- Familiar Feeling (2007), Independent
- Fera, EP (2009), Independent
