= Louis Jurine =

Swiss physician, surgeon and naturalist

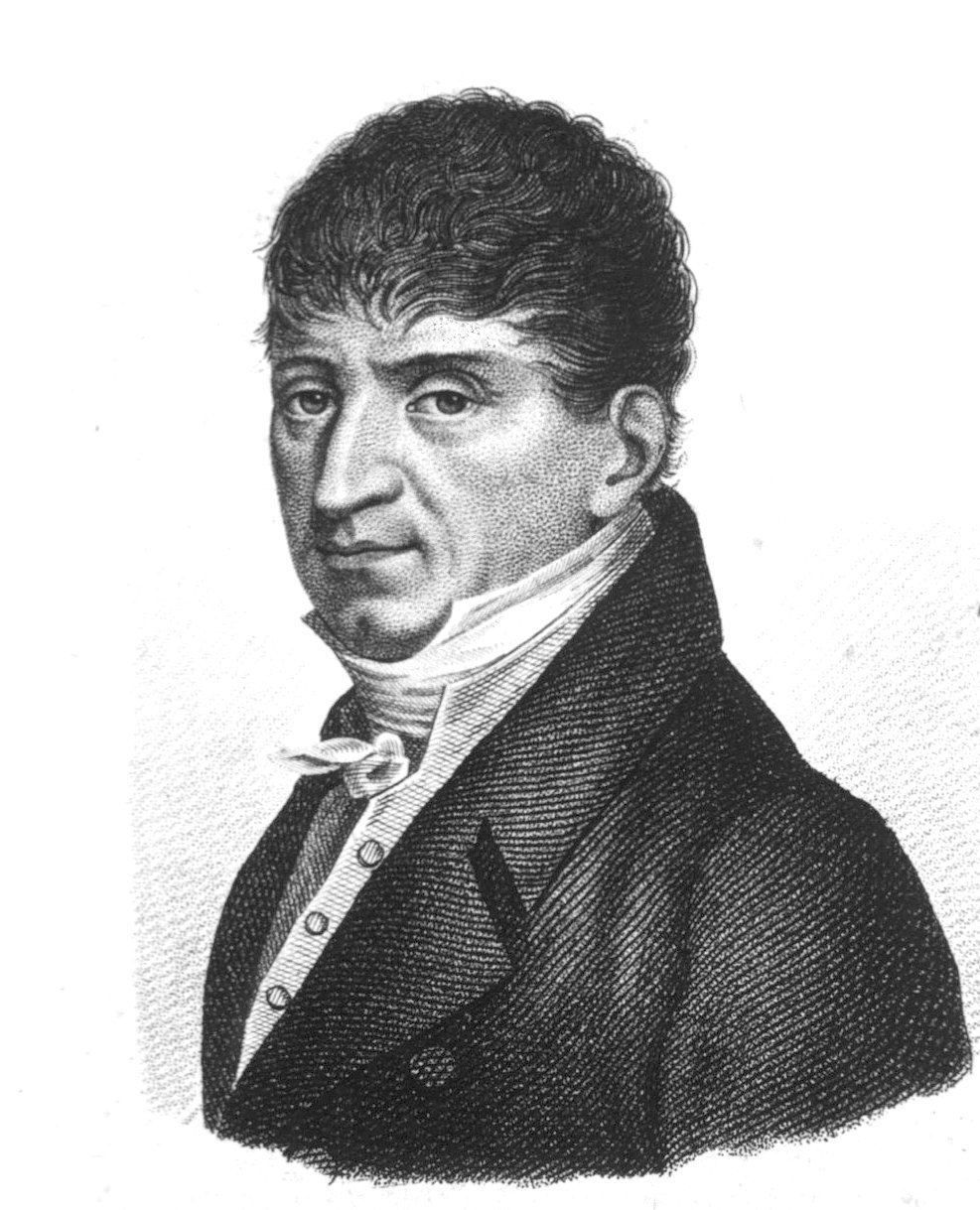
- Born: 6 February 1751; Geneva, Republic of Geneva
- Died: 20 October 1819 (aged 68); Chougny, Vandœuvres, Switzerland
- Medical career
- Profession: Surgeon, physician, naturalist

Louis Jurine (Note: He is sometimes erroneously referred to as "Charles Jurine" due to a mistake by S. Dijkgraaf in 1949. He misread Jurine's signature and gave his first name as "Charles". Dijkgraaf corrected this in 1960 without an explanation, but the erroneous first name "Charles" still appears in sources due to Dijkgraaf's mistake.) (French: [ʒyʁin]; 6 February 1751 – 20 October 1819) was a Swiss medical doctor, surgeon and naturalist mainly interested in entomology. He lived in Geneva.

== Surgeon ==
He studied surgery in Paris and quickly acquired a great reputation for his expertise in medicine and natural history beyond that which he had in Geneva. He taught courses in anatomy and surgery at the Société des Arts in Geneva and was made honorary professor of zoology at the Academy (today: University of Geneva). He also founded a maternity hospice in 1807 and was awarded prizes for his work on the gasses of the human body, artificial feeding of infants, and pectoral angina.

== Naturalist ==
Upon learning of Spallanzani's experiments with bats, in which Spallanzani showed that bats do not rely on sight when navigating in darkness, Jurine conducted a series of experiments from which he concluded that bats use sound to navigate in darkness.

== Collections ==
Jurine's collections of Hymenoptera, Coleoptera, Lepidoptera and Hemiptera are in the Natural History Museum of Geneva.

== Works ==
- Nouvelle méthode de classer les Hyménoptères et les Diptères. Hyménoptères. Genève (J.J. Paschoud) 1807. (Only 250 copies of this work were issued.) PDF
- Observations sur les ailes des hyménoptères. Mem. Accad. Sci. Torino 24 (1820): 177–214.
- Histoire des monocles, qui se trouvent aux environs de Genève. I-XVI, 1-260, 22 plates, Genève (J.J. Paschoud) 1820. PDF

== See also ==
- Category:Taxa named by Louis Jurine
