= Coregonus palaea =

Conservation status
- Least Concern (IUCN 3.1)

Scientific classification
- Kingdom: Animalia
- Phylum: Chordata
- Class: Actinopterygii
- Order: Salmoniformes
- Family: Salmonidae
- Genus: Coregonus
- Species: C. palaea

Binomial name
- Coregonus palaea Cuvier, 1829

Species of fish

Coregonus palaea is a species of freshwater fish in the salmon family. It is found in Swiss lakes of Neuchâtel and Biel. In recent years it has also been introduced to Lake Geneva and other lakes in France and Switzerland.

== Description ==
The fish can reach a recorded maximum length of 45 cm (18 in).

The fish usually spawns on near-shore gravel or regions in depths up to 50 metres (164 ft). Its spawning time depends on depth and temperature of the location, which is usually from November to December in shallow water and December to February in deeper regions.
