= Revue suisse de Zoologie =

- Discipline: Taxonomy, zoology
- Language: English
- Edited by: Natural History Museum of Geneva

Publication details
- History: 1893–present
- Publisher: Natural History Museum of Geneva (Switzerland)
- Frequency: Biannual
- Impact factor: 0.732 (2020)

Standard abbreviations
- ISO 4: Rev. Suisse Zool.

Indexing
- ISSN: 0035-418X

Links
- Journal homepage; Online access (1893-2022); Online access (2015-present)

The Revue suisse de Zoologie (English: Swiss Journal of Zoology) is a biannual peer-reviewed scientific journal for zoological systematics. It is published by the Natural History Museum of Geneva (Switzerland). It is financed by the Swiss Academy of Natural Sciences (SCNAT) and the City of Geneva, and mainly publishes the research results of Swiss researchers or work based on the collections of Swiss institutions.

== Abstracting and indexing ==
The journal is abstracted and indexed in:

- BIOSIS Previews
- CAB Abstracts
- Science Citation Index Expanded
- Scopus
