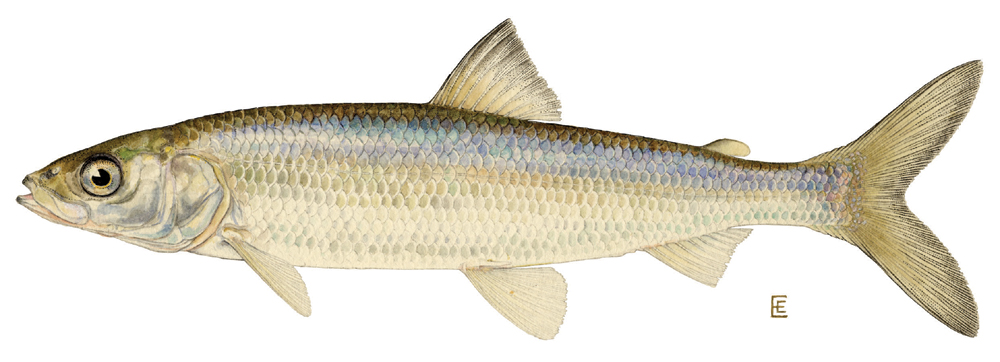
- Coregonus artedi

Scientific classification
- Kingdom: Animalia
- Phylum: Chordata
- Class: Actinopterygii
- Division: Teleostei
- Order: Salmoniformes
- Family: Salmonidae
- Subfamily: Coregoninae
- Genus: Coregonus

= Cisco (fish) =

Ciscoes

Group of fishes

The ciscoes (or ciscos) are salmonid fish that differ from other members of the genus Coregonus in having upper and lower jaws of approximately equal length and high gill raker counts. These species have been the focus of much study recently, as researchers have sought to determine the relationships among species that appear to have evolved very recently. Cisco is also specifically used for the North American species Coregonus artedi, also known as lake herring.

In previous taxonomic classifications, the ciscoes have been identified as a subgenus Leucichthys of the genus Coregonus. Based on molecular data this is not a natural classification however, as the ciscoes are polyphyletic, comprising two different lineages within the freshwater whitefishes.

== Continental North American ciscoes: Coregonus artedi sensu lato ==
Eight taxa of cisco have been recognized in the Laurentian Great Lakes and other interior lakes in once-glaciated parts of North America.

- †Longjaw cisco – Coregonus alpenae
- Cisco (lake cisco, northern cisco, or lake herring) – Coregonus artedi
- †Deepwater cisco – Coregonus johannae
- Bloater – Coregonus hoyi
- Kiyi – Coregonus kiyi
- †Blackfin cisco – Coregonus nigripinnis
- Shortnose cisco – Coregonus reighardi (thought to be possibly extinct, rediscovered)
- Shortjaw cisco – Coregonus zenithicus

Usually, several taxa of ciscoes are found in a single lake. They exhibit different habitat distributions, feeding and breeding habits and morphological adaptations e.g. in their gill raker numbers. In the Great Lakes, at least five ciscoes coexist.

According to genetic analyses, these cisco types do not represent unique, separate evolutionary lineages, but similar cisco morphs have evolved and attained their specific characteristics largely independently in each lake. Therefore, it has been suggested that they should not be recognized formally as distinct taxa, but all considered members of a single species, Coregonus artedi (sensu lato). or Coregonus artedi complex. Nevertheless, for conservation and management purposes the sympatric morphs in each lake should be considered ESUs, evolutionarily significant units. This taxonomic view is not widely accepted however, which has complicated discussions of the conservation status of some species.

Ciscoes have been exploited in commercial fisheries, particularly in the Laurentian Great Lakes where the deepwater forms were the basis of the so-called chub fishery. The chub fishery had nothing to do with the various cyprinid fish species known as chubs but was exclusively based on the various species of ciscoes. The fishery continued as cisco stocks fell and non-native species such as sea lamprey, rainbow smelt and alewife spread through the system and increased in abundance. Alewife, in particular, have been implicated as a predator of cisco eggs and larvae, and as a competitor with ciscoes. The fishery shifted focus from species to species as cisco numbers declined and has been largely defunct for some years.

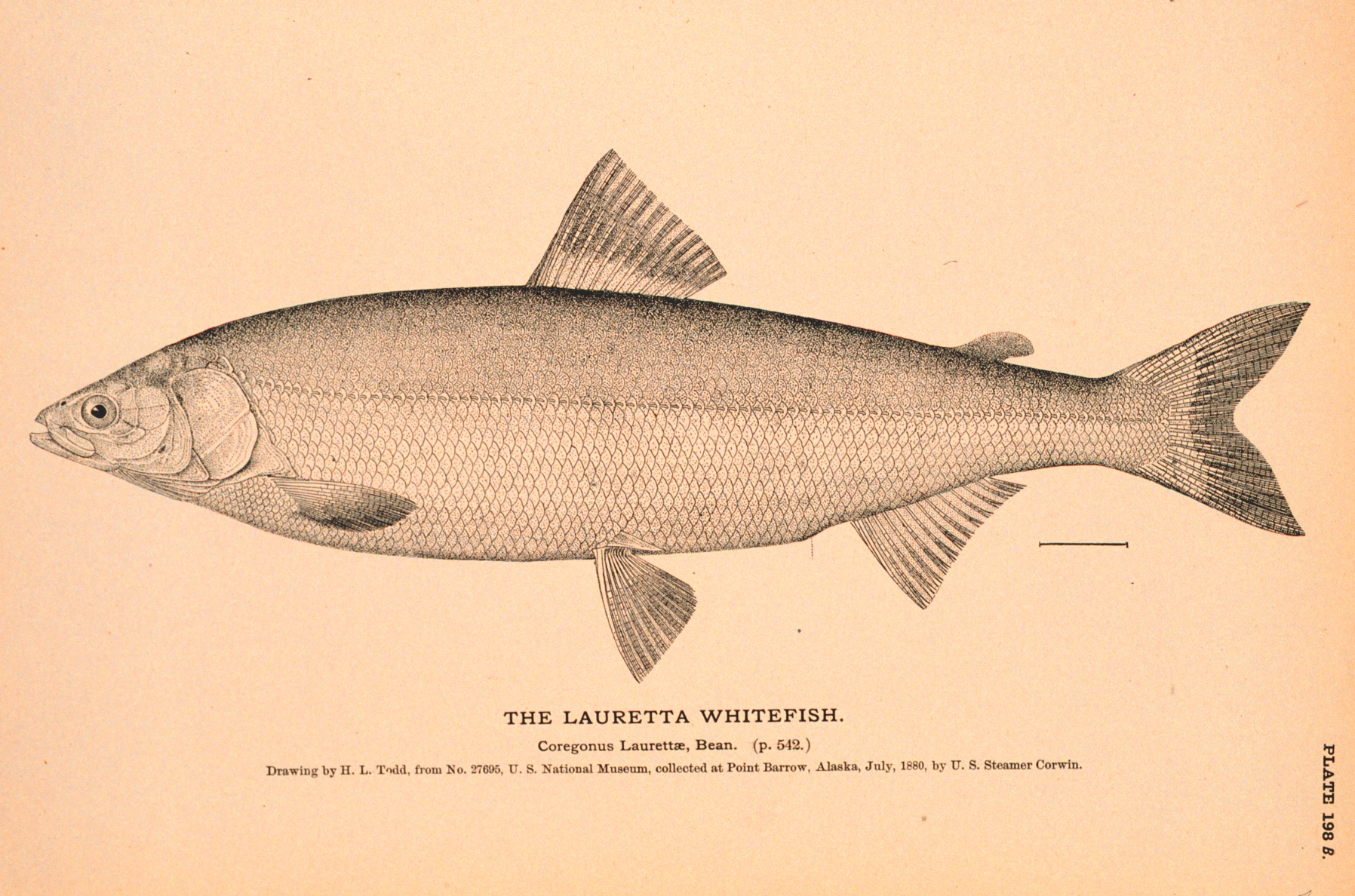
Bering cisco

== Ciscoes of northwestern North America ==
Three species of cisco inhabit waters of the northwestern North America. These have been found to represent distinct evolutionary lineages, by genetic data.

- Arctic cisco – Coregonus autumnalis
- Bering cisco – Coregonus laurettae
- Least cisco – Coregonus sardinella

== Eurasian ciscoes ==
The ranges of the three cisco species above extend across Beringia to the Asian coasts. Of those the Arctic cisco and least cisco (=sardine cisco) are widespread through northern Siberia. In the inland waters of northern Europe, the European cisco or vendace (Coregonus albula) replaces the Siberian sardine cisco. Some of the cisco lineages are genetically very close, such as the European and sardine ciscoes. Within some species, geographically separated populations have been treated as distinct taxa, despite close genetic relationships, such as the vendace and the pollan (Arctic cisco) on the British Isles. The European cisco has also evolved into ecologically distinct sympatric populations or ecomorphs independently within several lakes (e.g. autumn and spring spawning populations, normal and dwarf morphs), which have been designated as distinct taxa, making the systematics complicated as with the North American Coregonus artedi complex.

- Bering cisco – Coregonus laurettae
- Arctic cisco – Coregonus autumnalis
  - Irish pollan - "Coregonus pollan": an Irish subspecies or group of populations
- Sardine cisco (= least cisco) – Coregonus sardinella
- Peled – Coregonus peled: part of the C. sardinella complex
- European cisco (=vendace) – Coregonus albula
  - "Coregonus vandesius": group of British populations
  - Stechlin cisco – Coregonus fontanae: local sympatric spring spawning dwarfed sister species
  - Coregonus trybomi: local sympatric spring-spawning sister species
  - Coregonus lucinensis: local sympatric dwarfed sister species

== Phylogeny ==
Based on molecular data from mitochondrial DNA, the ciscoes comprise two distinct, unrelated groups:

- The Coregonus artedi complex along with C. laurettae and C. autumnalis lineages
- The Coregonus sardinella complex, including C. peled and C. albula. This group is more closely related to the "true whitefishes" (e.g. the common whitefish C. lavaretus, lake whitefish C. clupeaformis) than to the C. artedi complex ciscoes.
