= Egg Lake =

Egg Lake may refer to:

- Egg Lake (Nova Scotia, Canada)
- Egg Lake (Whatcom County, Washington), in North Cascades National Park, WA, United States
- Egg Lake, community in Regional Municipality of Wood Buffalo, Canada
- Egg Lake (Saskatchewan), a lake in Saskatchewan, Canada
- Egg Lake monkeyflower
