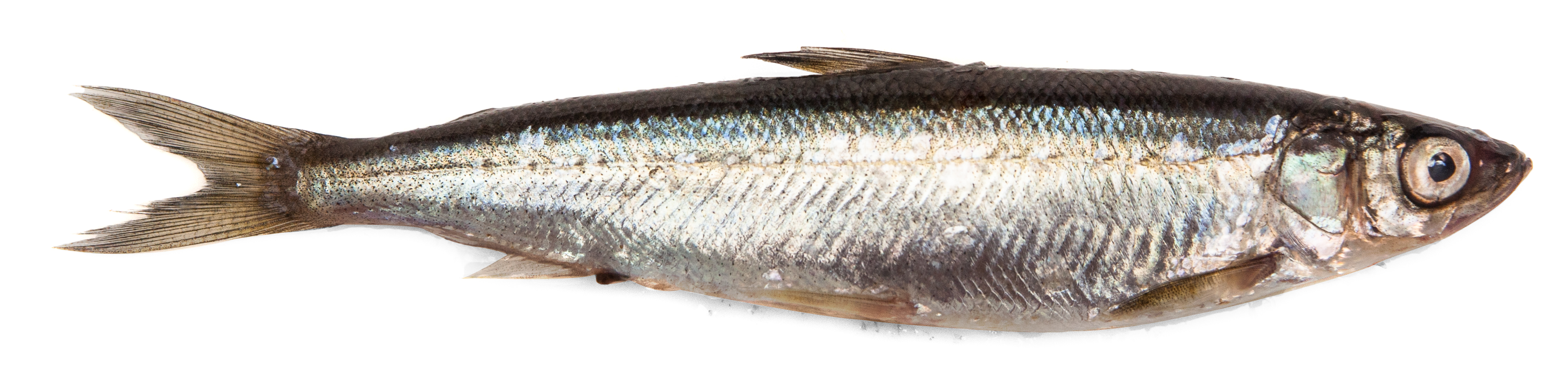

Conservation status
- Least Concern (IUCN 3.1)

Scientific classification
- Kingdom: Animalia
- Phylum: Chordata
- Class: Actinopterygii
- Division: Teleostei
- Order: Salmoniformes
- Family: Salmonidae
- Genus: Coregonus
- Species: C. albula

Binomial name
- Coregonus albula (Linnaeus, 1758)

= Coregonus albula =

Species of fish

Coregonus albula, known as the vendace or as the Least cisco, is a species of freshwater whitefish in the family Salmonidae. It is found in lakes in northern Europe, especially Finland, Latvia, Lithuania, Sweden, Russia and Estonia, and in some lakes of Norway, the United Kingdom, northern Germany, and Poland. It is also found in diluted brackish water in the Gulfs of Finland and Bothnia, both of which are in the Baltic Sea.

The length of an adult is normally about 20 cm (8 in). The maximum age is about ten years.

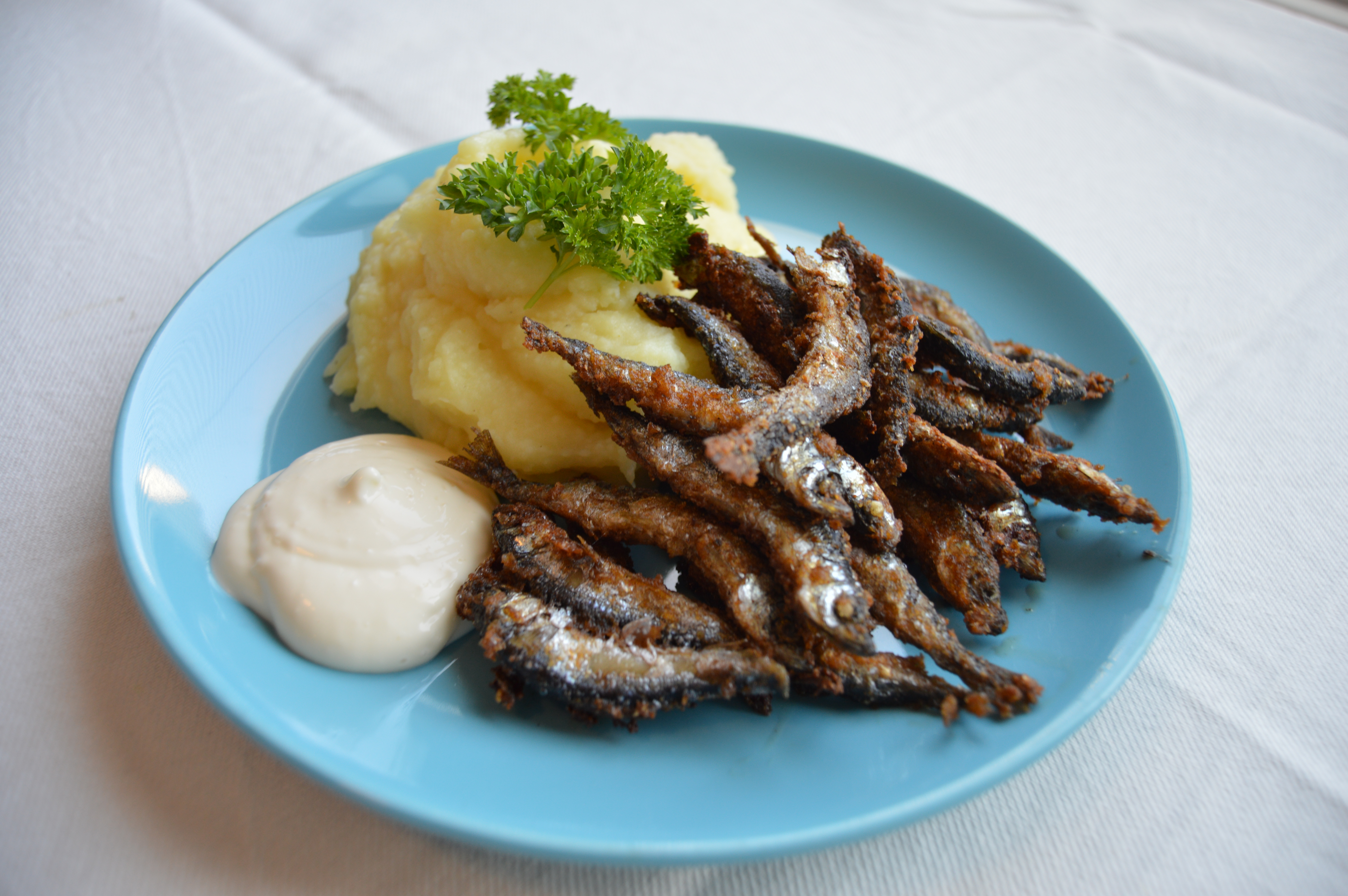
Fried vendace is a popular summertime food in Finland.

The vendace is traditionally the most important target of freshwater fisheries in parts of Fennoscandia and Russia. Vendace roe is considered a delicacy, which has been granted a PDO status in the Swedish Bothnian Bay archipelago (Kalix löjrom).

== Description ==
The vendace is a slim and streamlined fish with an adipose fin - an additional small fin on the back between the dorsal fin and the tail (caudal fin) which is typical in the salmon family. Its lower jaw is longer than the upper one. It is similar in appearance to both the common whitefish (Coregonus lavaretus sensu lato), whose upper jaw is longer than its lower one, and the peled (Coregonus peled), whose jaws are of equal length. The back is bluish green or brown, the flanks are silvery and the belly white. This fish seldom grows more than 30 cm (12 in) long.

== Biology ==
Vendace mainly feed on zooplankton, such as small crustaceans and their larvae, but larger fish also feed on floating insects and fish fry. The fish live in schools made up of large groups of individuals. They lay their eggs on pebbly or sandy ground, some in shallow water and others at depths of down to 20 m (66 ft). The fish mature at a young age and most spawn for the first time in their second year, but a few may breed in their first autumn.

In the Volga River basin, the vendace acts as a "northern" invader. Following the creation of the reservoir system, the species dispersed downstream from Lake Beloye, reaching the Kuibyshev Reservoir by the mid-20th century. However, due to long-term climate warming and increasing water temperatures, the species is currently experiencing a range regression. Recent southernmost records are limited to the upper pool of the Zhigulevskaya hydroelectric power station near Toliatti, and the population is now considered a rare but stable component of the pelagic community.

== Systematics ==
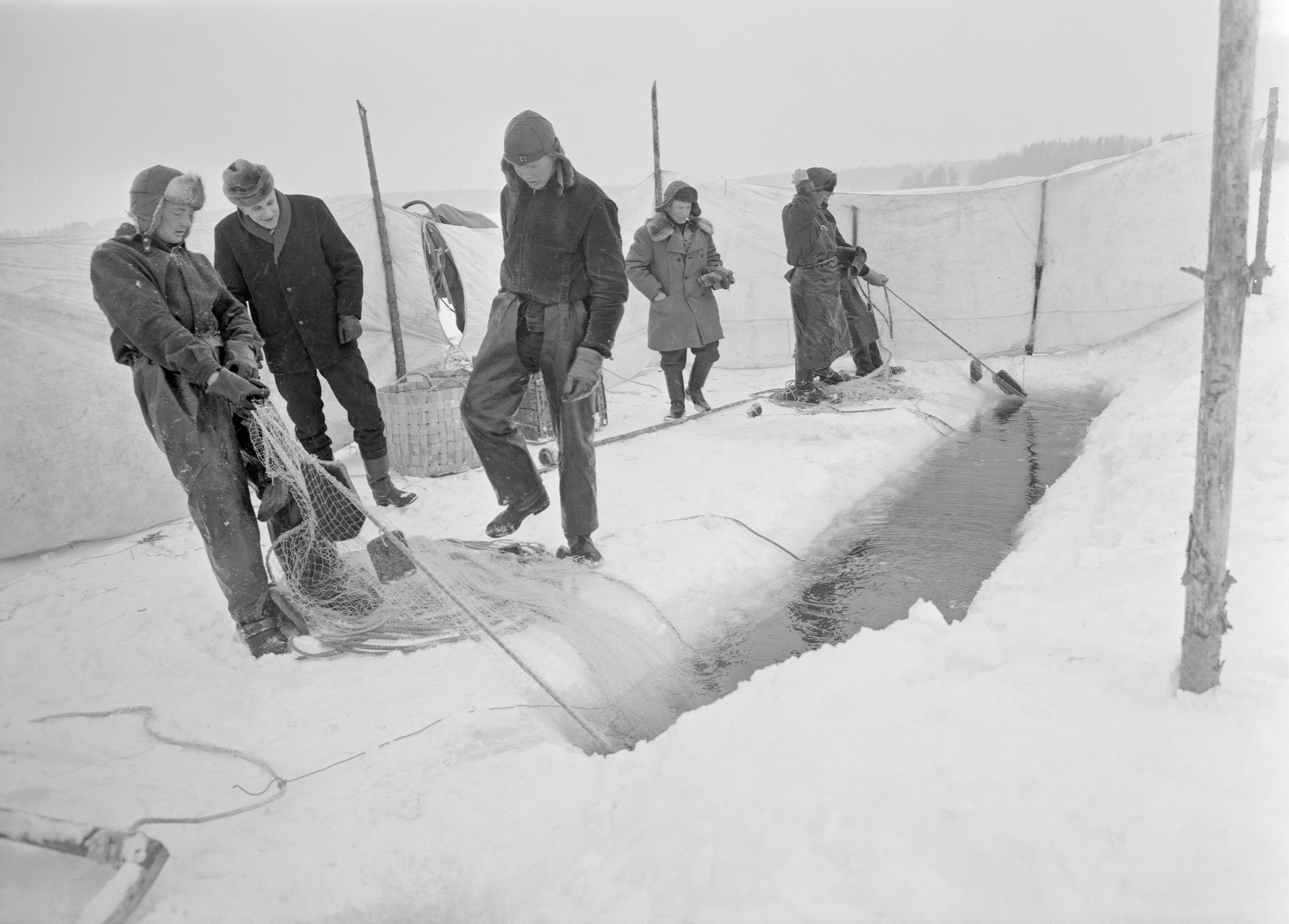
Finns fishing vendace with seine on Puruvesi lake in Finland in February 1964

The European vendace is very closely related to the Siberian Coregonus sardinella (sardine cisco) and also to C. peled, although phenotypic differences are clear.

Within the vendace, taxonomic subdivisions have been suggested both on geographical grounds and between sympatric ecotypes. FishBase lists the British populations of vendace as a separate species, Coregonus vandesius, but this distinction is not accepted by all scientists.

Coregonus albula generally breeds in the autumn, but in several North European lakes distinct spring-spawning populations of vendace exist, some of which have been described as separate species: in Sweden, as Coregonus trybomi, and in two lakes of northern Germany, as Coregonus fontanae and Coregonus lucinensis. These populations are sympatric with autumn-spawning vendace and seem to have evolved post-glacially from them independently in each lake.

Seven vendaces in the coat of arms of Viitasaari in Finland
