= Yukon Men =

- Genre: Adventure
- Narrated by: Pat Duke; Darren O'Hare; Chris Rollins (Seasons 5&6)
- Country of origin: United States
- Original language: English
- No. of seasons: 7
- No. of episodes: 60

Production
- Executive producer: French Horwitz
- Production locations: Tanana, Alaska, United States
- Camera setup: Multiple
- Running time: 40–45 minutes
- Production company: Paper Route Productions

Original release
- Network: Discovery Channel; Animal Planet
- Release: August 24, 2012 – April 22, 2016

Yukon Men is an unscripted American television series aired on the Discovery Channel. It was produced by Paper Route Productions and premiered on August 24, 2012.

The series details the lives of several inhabitants of the remote Alaskan village of Tanana which is situated by the Yukon River. These men make their living by fishing, hunting and trapping game as well as raising sled dogs and logging. The show's prominent themes are community and survival.

== Initial reception ==
Yukon Men's critical reception by the media has been mostly positive. Mark A. Perigard from the Boston Herald stated "For a network that specializes in tough-guy shows (think "Survivorman" and "Deadliest Catch"), "Yukon Men" doesn't stint on testosterone." Tom Conroy from Media Life Magazine said "The show doesn't need all this dramatic foreshadowing. The scenes of hunting, setting traps, dressing a carcass and even stoking the furnaces at the water plant are enlightening and fun. Most of the men work with their sons, and the bonding isn't overhyped. The half-light of winter gives an extra beauty to the spectacular landscapes."

== Key personnel ==
Stan Zuray: Stan was raised in Boston, Massachusetts before he moved to Alaska. He is an outdoorsman with over 40 years of experience in the Alaskan wilderness.

Joey Zuray: Joey is Stan's son in his early twenties. According to his father, he is a natural at home in the Alaskan interior. He hunts and traps to sustain himself, his family and elders of the community.

Charlie Wright: Charlie is a water-plant operator, mechanic, trapper and hunter.

Robert "Bob" Wright: Robert is Charlie's son in his early twenties. Throughout the show he is being taught family traditions and skills such as beaver trapping by his father.

The Moore family: Pat Moore owns the leading local kennel where his children Thomas Moore and Courtney Agnes work. He also has to care for his wife Lorraine.

James Roberts: James is a major provider of lumber for Tanana. He also owns a kennel. His teenage sons help with the businesses.

== List of episodes ==
=== Season 1 (2012) ===
No. overall	No. in season	Title	Original release date	U.S. viewers (millions)
1	1	"Hunt or Starve"	August 24, 2012	1.955
Stan Zuray, a hunter/trapper with 40 years of experience and his son Joey are hunting for caribou near the Ray Mountains in dog sleds and snowmobiles but ultimately come up empty-handed after a three-day hunt. Courtney Agnes, whose husband works in a nearby oil field discovers a wolf has been scavenging dried fish hung in her nearby smokehouse. Local outdoorsman, trapper and handyman Charlie Wright sets up traps nearby in an attempt to catch the wolf. Charlie is then called to the town water plant where they are low on wood to keep the water from freezing. He calls upon the village wood dealer James Roberts for 10 cords (36 m^{3}) of firewood to heat the water plant. Stan Zuray and Charlie Wright then get a fresh report of a caribou herd 90 miles (140 km) away and set out with their sons. Their hunt is successful and they return to Tanana with four caribou that they distribute to friends and family.
2	2	"The Race for Fur"	August 31, 2012	1.484
Stan and Joey Zuray set a line of traps for animal furs. Charlie and Bob Wright set lines for trapping beavers in the river. Stan and Joey wind up with a wolverine in one of their traps while Charlie and Bob catch a beaver. Tanana's only gas pump is subject to a mechanical failure. While going to check traps with Joey, Bob's snowmobile breaks and he has to hike six miles to cut down trees to pay for its repair costs. Charlie shoots the wolf that has been scavenging food stores from the village.
3	3	"Going for Broke"	September 7, 2012	1.518
Charlie and Bob search for beavers; Stan and Joe have a run-in with a bear.
4	4	"On Thin Ice"	September 14, 2012	1.642
Stan and Joey go goose hunting; Charlie and Bob compete in a contest.
5	5	"Tragic Spring"	September 21, 2012	TBD
Charlie's brother-in-law goes missing.
6	6	"Man Up, Move Out"	September 28, 2012	TBD
Joey is tasked with moving a house; Charlie hunts a terrorizing black bear.
7	7	"Logjam"	October 5, 2012	TBD
Driftwood is collected from local rivers to be used as firewood; Stan gets caught in a storm; and Charlie has a run-in with a black bear.
8	8	"Wheel of Misfortune"	October 12, 2012	TBD
Stan and Pat place fish wheels in the river to prepare for an 18-hour fishing window; Charlie begins setting up fishing nets to catch salmon. Stan was able to catch several pounds of bering ciscos for his dogs and four or five king salmon for his family, but the Moores caught only one cisco from their own fish wheel.
9	9	"Last Chance"	October 19, 2012	TBD
A hunt turns dangerous for Joey and Bob; grizzly bears begin stealing food from fish camps. Bob is placed in charge of clearing his father's trapline, while his father is out fishing for salmon. In addition to a caribou that Joey and Bob caught on their hunt, Stan and Joey catch a large amount of chum salmon to supply their dogs for the winter, as well as between 30 and 40 king salmon for their family. They also shot and killed a grizzly that had been stalking their camp, supplying them with several hundred pounds of meat for their smokehouse. The Moores caught several pounds of chum salmon for their dogs and less than 30 king salmon for their extended family, which is not enough for the winter. James Roberts caught only a few chum salmon and king salmon in his net for himself, his family, and his sled dogs, but is relieved a bit when Joey brings him several pounds of grizzly meat to supply his family and his dogs for a few days.

=== Season 2 (2013) ===
No. overall	No. in season	Title	Original release date
10	1	"Feast or Famine"	February 22, 2013
Courtney hunts for moose in the Season 2 opener. Later, Stan nearly loses his fish supply; and James' dogs are threatened by a fatal illness.
11	2	"New Kid in Town"	March 1, 2013
Emergency surgery is needed for Stan's new lead sled dog, Crackers. The Moores hire an inexperienced dog handler to help them with their 40 sled dogs, while Bob helps his father clear the trapline and hunt for moose in the Alaskan bush.
12	3	"Hell Freezes Over"	March 8, 2013
Tempers flare as the villagers prepare for winter.
13	4	"Tough Choices"	March 15, 2013
Charlie and Bob battle a vicious wolverine threatening their trapline.
14	5	"Fresh Blood"	March 22, 2013
A wolverine threatens the Moore's fish camp; Charlie and Bob hunt a bear.
15	6	"Pray for Snow"	March 30, 2013
Joey sets a new trap line; James is plagued by a shortage of wood.
16	7	"Eeling and Dealing"	April 5, 2013
Eels are fed to dogs; Stan and Joe go moose hunting.
17	8	"Dead of Winter"	April 12, 2013
A town crisis prevents Charlie from hunting; James' snow machine is destroyed.

=== Season 3 (2013) ===
No. overall	No. in season	Title	Original release date
18	1	"No Quarter"	October 20, 2013
The dark days of winter are over. Stan is out checking his trap line when a blizzard hits Yukon Valley. Bob is supposed to set beaver traps for Charlie. The Moores install a fish trap.
19	2	"Turf War"	October 27, 2013
Stan's brother comes to visit. The Moores try their luck at beaver trapping. Charlie has to defend his trap line. Wolves are showing up close to the village.
20	3	"Wolf Invasion"	November 3, 2013
The annual dog sled race is taking place while a wolf pack threatens the village.
21	4	"Deadly Crossing"	November 10, 2013
Stan and Joey have to cross a thawing river so they can close up their cabin for the summer. The Moores have a new dog handler. Francis has to help his father James with the lumber business.
22	5	"Rite of Spring"	November 17, 2013
It's goose hunting season. Conflicts between fathers and sons ensue. Pat and Courtney fly to Anchorage because their wife and mother is in hospital. Their new dog handler has to take care of the dogs by himself.
23	6	"River Rising"	November 24, 2013
The village gets prepared for high water when the ice on the river finally melts. At the same time, a black bear comes too close to some houses.
24	7	"Aftermath"	November 30, 2013
The ice on the river has gone. James, Francis and Joey want to collect driftwood. Charlie and Bob try to catch fish. Pat hires a new dog handler.
25	8	"Season of Change"	December 1, 2013
The Moores have to think about the future of their business. Stan and his daughter set the fish wheel. Bob leaves Tanana.

=== Season 4 (2014) ===
No. overall	No. in season	Title	Original release date
26	1	"Breaking Points"	September 2, 2014
The inhabitants of Tanana learn that there are plans to build a road into town.
27	2	"Day of Reckoning"	September 9, 2014
The town gets shut down due to a double homicide.
28	3	"The Longest Day"	September 16, 2014
Joey transports a truck on a self-made log raft. Pat's nephew returns to Tanana after having been gone for years. Charlie and James go moose hunting for a potlatch. Stan almost loses his boat.
29	4	"Rising Sons"	September 23, 2014
Charlie's claim on his trap line gets threatened. Joey and Bob go hunting with a bow and arrows. James tests his younger sons' survival abilities.
30	5	"New Blood"	September 30, 2014
An old friend of Stan's comes into town with a proposition for Stan. A former inhabitant of Tanana wants to return and learn the subsistence lifestyle, which Courtney helps her with. Charlie and Bob go hunting.
31	6	"Mother vs. Nature"	October 7, 2014
An unusually big number of black bears comes near and into Tanana. Charlie has to come up with ways to fix the water plant. Stan and his friend work on their mining project.
32	7	"Stan's Gamble"	October 14, 2014
Stan and his friend try to bring a bulldozer back to life. Charlie and Joey want to test their hunting skills on a Dall sheep hunt. Pat's son Thomas returns from Fairbanks.
33	8	"Winter Takes All"	October 21, 2014
Stan hauls his winter food supply home; James strives to fortify his wood business.

=== Season 5 (2015) ===
No. overall	No. in season	Title	Original release date
34	1	"Dark Days"	September 15, 2015
The Tozi River wolf pack is growing on the outskirts of Tanana. The dark days are approaching and the town only has a few hours of twilight each day, the wolves have the advantage.
35	2	"The Black Wolf"	September 22, 2015
Creating a barricade around the town against the encroaching Tozi River wolf pack wasn't enough. Charlie's only option is to hunt the leader of the pack but who is hunting who?
36	3	"On Thin Ice"	September 29, 2015
Stan is asked to use his bulldozer to make an ice road across the Yukon River and has a lifeline to Thomas' snowmobile in case the bulldozer falls through the ice. Joey and Bob follow a rumour that caribou have been spotted on Bald Mountain. As they begin their hunt Bob's snowmobile breaks down and they struggle to find the survival cabin as darkness sets in and the weather deteriorates. Charlie is frustrated that Nations isn't looking after the trap line he got from Charlie.
37	4	"Gut check"	October 6, 2015
Nations and Courtney head to Fairbanks to compete in the first race of the season The North American. While Nations is in Fairbanks Charlie and Bob trap beaver on Nation's trap line knowing Nations will find out when he returns. Stan's dog Wacko falls ill leaving Stan with a dilemma.
38	5	"Tanana's test"	October 13, 2015
Tanana is a checkpoint on the mighty Iditarod, 900 mile (1500km) dog sled race and there's much to do for Stan and Pat to ensure it is a success for the town. Charlie and Bob are asked to hunt a 10-foot Grizzly bear that's destroying a miner's camp in exchange for a generous gift from the mine owner. Joey gives a young dog a number of tests to see if it has what it takes to be a good hunting dog.
39	6	"Life on the line"	October 20, 2015
Pat, Nations and Courtney have one last opportunity in the final dog sled race of the season The Yukon Open after the disappointment in Fairbanks at the North American. Nations decides to talk to Charlie about Charlie trapping on his family trap line and finds himself in a volatile situation he wasn't prepared for. Both men then consider what could happen next as the conflict unfolds. Stan and Kathleen make a trip to the Tozi River cabin to decide if they want to move there permanently now the road is coming to Tanana but some surprises await them when they arrive.
40	7	"Blood on their Hands"	October 27, 2015
Joey is surprised by a vicious predator when out checking his trap lines and needs to react quickly for his own safety. Back in town, Joey needs to pack up the few skins he has for the season and fly to Fairbanks hoping to sell the fur to make a little bit of money knowing there is an important potlatch coming up. James takes his 2 sons Mike and Joe on an important right of passage, their first hunt. Mike and Joe also compete in the junior category of the Yukon Open dog sled race but more importantly, they compete against each other for bragging rights for the next 12 months. Charlie and Stan team up for a last-ditch effort after one of the worst trapping seasons in memory. To be successful they'll need to work hard and put to use all the hunting skills they have learned from the elders before them.
41	8	"All In"	November 3, 2015
After a warmer-than-usual winter Charlie and Stan discover treacherous conditions on the trail to Fish Lake for the approaching geese hunting season. They have no option but to close the trail and the town bands together to cut a new trail but it takes valuable time they could have spent hunting. The conditions on Fish Lake are also warm and treacherous leading to decisions about whether to retrieve fallen game or not. With the conditions so warm and the ice cover on the rivers melting so fast, if they stay too long at the hunting grounds they won't be able to get back home safely and the recent tragedy in town weighs heavily on everyone's minds. After his logging business has been destroyed by the new road coming to town, James pulls all his remaining finances together for a new venture which arrives by plane in a cardboard box but he starts a new business from scratch in a small town to save his family from disaster.
42	9	"Breaking Point"	November 10, 2015
The village is on high alert as the time for the Yukon River ice break out draws closer. Charlie and Stan set about to keep watch on the river to warn the village when it begins. The Tanana River ice cover has already broken out as it usually does days before the Yukon River ice breaks out. Joey shows his inexperience when after a conversation with Charlie he is determined to proceed against Charlie's advice and heads across the Yukon River to the Tanana River and to Squaw Crossing to hunt geese believing he can get back the same day and before the Yukon River ice break out begins. First he puts a hole in his boat as he navigates through floating icebergs and has to try to make a temporary fix and bail water out while navigating the boat through the floating icebergs to shore. Then his inexperienced dog runs away after Joey fires his gun at geese for the first time. After an hour of searching for his dog in semi thick bush and vegetation, he finds bear footprints. As it starts to get dark Joey is cut off from Tanana by the Yukon River ice break out now in full force with no survival gear and no plan. Stan is highly concerned when he sees Joey through binoculars across the river and understands the danger he is in. He goes to see Charlie to see if they can come up with a rescue plan but what can they do from the other side when the dangerous Yukon River ice breakout is in full force. Nations and Courtney combine together and build a smokehouse as a surprise for Pat with a bit of Outback ingenuity.

=== Season 6 (2016) ===
No. overall	No. in season	Title	Original release date
43	1	"Tanana's Last Stand"	March 11, 2016
Massive wildfires surround Tanana on all sides and on both sides of the Yukon and Tanana Rivers after a warm winter and a dry spring leave conditions tinder dry. A full-scale mobilisation erupts in the village in the morning after the fires make massive gains towards the village during the night and the wind is strong and unfavourable. With multiple wildfires across the state of Alaska engulfing about half a million acres, state resources are spread thin. Firefighters and what they can carry are ferried across the Yukon River to Tanana by villagers using their own boats. Later Charlie and Joey use their boats to take teams of firefighters to different locations up and down the river because of their local knowledge and ability to recognise local landmarks even in thick smoke. Aeroplanes evacuate as many people as possible from the village before thick smoke from the wildfires closes the airport. Courtney and her children catch one of the last flights out of Tanana before the airport closes, and Pat is left to defend the home. With everything on the line, many different people from within the village form up different teams for different tasks to fight the fires on many fronts knowing that any failure could cost lives and leave them with nothing but ashes. With James being the most experienced logger in the village he leads a team to attempt to cut a long and wide fire break up Mission Hill before the fire reaches them. With Stan being the longest serving and most senior member of the Tanana Fire Department he feels great responsibility and stress having only limited local fire fighting equipment and with so much at stake.
44	2	"From the Ashes"	March 18, 2016
The village of Tanana only just escaped devastation from the wildfires. The wildfires are out but half a million acres are destroyed with the fires coming within half a mile of the village of Tanana. The village is surrounded by charred and destroyed forests on both sides of the Yukon and Tanana Rivers for miles in both directions. With the forests destroyed the villagers understand the wildlife they rely on to live is also gone from the destroyed forests. It's the start of the 20-day moose hunting season and the villagers know it will be a lot harder this year with much of the usual moose habitat destroyed. With Pat having to stay home and look after the dogs the responsibility for getting a moose falls on Courtney. Courtney agrees knowing there is no alternative and takes her friend Kayle with her as backup. Together the 2 girls, Courtney and Kayle bravely travel far up the Yukon River to where they've never hunted before looking for anywhere suitable to hunt knowing for their families' sake they can't afford to return empty-handed. Joey and a team of men set about to try to cut a path through to the traditional hunting grounds around Fish Lake and see if the area survived the wildfires to take word back to the village if it is a place where people from the village can hunt for moose in the future or not. Joey and his team also don't want to return to the village empty-handed knowing there are only a few days left in the moose hunting season. We meet for the first time the young couple Chris and Jessi Morse who are in Manley Hot Springs preparing to leave by boat to try to find the cabin Chris grew up in on the Cosna River with the hope and dream they might be able to live a subsistence lifestyle out there. They load all their belongings and everything they think they might need to survive into 2 small canoes that float just above the water line and are lashed together with poles. Each canoe has an outboard motor tied to the back of it and with one person in each canoe, they need to carefully coordinate each outboard motor to enable the craft to have even limited steering control. They set out hoping to find the cabin before dark. As they progress up the Cosna River evidence of the recent wildfires leaves them uncertain as to what to expect where Chris remembers the cabin used to be years ago. Also navigating on the winding river in the fragile craft becomes harder with bends, rapids and the river littered with fire debris as night begins to fall.
45	3	"No Man's Land"	March 25, 2016
As time is running out on the short moose hunting season Joey and his team have to camp at Fish Lake hoping to find a moose to hunt. They camp and travel around Fish Lake and around the Outer Lakes area looking for any fresh signs that moose are even in the area knowing that the moose hunting season will end soon. Chris and Jessi know they have a lot of work to do if they are to make it living on the Cosna River. They set about building a small and rough smokehouse knowing that if they are successful hunting a moose they will need the smokehouse to preserve the meat and stop it from spoiling. Even though the moose hunting season will end soon they need to complete the smokehouse before they go hunting in addition to their usual tasks of cutting wood to keep warm and hunting small game for their daily food. For Chris and Jessi the daily reality of what they need to do to survive begins to set in. Charlie and Bob travel far away down the Yukon River to Spring Lake where they hope the wildfires have left enough habitat for moose to still be there.
46	4	"Desperate Measures"	April 1, 2016
Knowing this coming winter will be hard to survive on the small amount of food they have Pat decides to try something that hasn't been tried before. Pat calls it 'thinking outside the box'. He decides to trade one good sled dog for 4 goats and travels to Manley Hot Springs to make the trade but quickly finds out that looking after goats is a lot different than looking after dogs. After hunting for days at Spring Lake without finding any signs of a moose Charlie and Bob know that time is running out for them. Charlie uses the wisdom that has been passed down to him from his elders to look for signs in the environment and other wildlife in the area to continue the hunt for moose and in turn, passes this wisdom on to his son Bob. James thinks the wildfires may have been both good and bad for him. Good for him in that villagers will come to him for timber and supplies to rebuild so he sets out to find out what has happened to his wood yard further up the Yukon River. When he gets there he finds his wood yard has been totally decimated by the wildfires with nothing left but ashes and nothing to salvage. He has no other option but to travel further up the Yukon River looking for an area for another wood yard knowing it will be hard to find a suitable area and much further away. Stan travels to 12 mile cabin not knowing what to find but expects the worst. His worst fears are realised when he gets there and finds it totally destroyed by the wildfires. When he gets back to Tanana with his report the village council decides to rebuild the cabin with as many donated supplies as possible. On the final days of the moose hunting season Chris and Jessi are finally ready to begin hunting and so head off to the wetlands. As the hunt becomes increasingly desperate because time is running out they decide they have no other option than to split up and cover twice as much area knowing that in addition to moose, there are also black bears in the area. Knowing this they still need to use the thick forest surrounding the wetlands for cover while hunting moose. Jessi is very unsure if it's a good idea to split up knowing the dangers but bravely agrees knowing it's their best and only real option left if they hope to have moose for the dark days of winter.
47	5	"Drive to Survive"	April 8, 2016
Charlie and Bob travel to Rampart to visit Charlie's mother and to have a look at her fish wheel that has been damaged by floating logs on the Yukon River as a result of the wildfires. When they get there they find a huge pile of logs jammed up against and under the fish wheel severely damaging it and pushing the fish wheel up and partly onto the shoreline. With chainsaws, they start the difficult and dangerous job of cutting away the log jam. They try various methods to try to free the fish wheel but in the end decide it is too badly damaged by the logs to be able to work properly and will need to be properly repaired before being used again. There is not enough time to repair the fish wheel this season before the river freezes over and Charlie's mother doesn't have enough fish to survive the dark days of winter. Charlie and Bob decide the only other option is to hunt for fish the traditional way and they set about trying to make fish spears from what they can find. During the day the fish hunting proves fruitless and a waste of time so they decide to try again at night. This time with the help of cousin Mike they set out to hunt fish with spears at night with torches, lanterns and head lamps. In Tanana Stan thinks that the only way to rebuild the 12-mile cabin is to transport the materials there by a 4-wheel drive vehicle. A 4-wheel drive vehicle has never been driven to the 12-mile cabin before but Stan believes it is worth a try. Stan goes to see Pat to ask if Pat would be willing to donate one of his 4-wheel drive vehicles for the project. Pat recognizes the importance to the village and agrees to donate one. Together they look around Pat's yard and select an old contractor's fleet service vehicle with a toolbox body on the back. Stan drives it back to Stan's place. Stan then asks Joey to help him rebuild it into a monster truck so they set about stripping it down and rebuilding it. After the failure to hunt moose, Chris and Jessi are struggling each day to survive. The wood they need is now getting farther away and consuming more of their time to the point where it is becoming unsustainable. There is an old snow machine body that appears to have been broken down for years. They decide they have no option but for Chris to spend a day trying to make it work while Jessi continues to haul wood on her own in the forest knowing that if it can be repaired with what they have lying around it will open up so many more opportunities for them to haul wood, hunt and trap through winter.
48	6	"The Yukon Way"	April 15, 2016
Pat and Courtney arrive at the goat pen to find one of the goats is not eating and is sick. If they can't nurse it back to health 1/4 of their planned winter food will have to be wasted. Stan and Joey load up the truck with the pre-made floors, walls and roof and anything else they think they need and set off hoping to make it to the 12-mile cabin building site before nightfall. Travelling on a trail no vehicle has ever attempted before is difficult. Thick snow covers old tree stumps and it's not long before trouble strikes. An old tree stump buried under snow gets wedged in the undercarriage of the truck rupturing a hydraulic transmission oil line threatening to end the journey. Ever resourceful Stan fixes it with a piece of string and plastic tape and but the steep 30% incline up 12-mile hill over the rough terrain is still to come. Charlie and James rush to save a village elder's cabin that has slid off its foundation and is threatening to slide further and into the nearby creek. Together with the village elder Paddy's son Tyson, they struggle on steep, slippery, wet and boggy terrain close to the creek to first jack up the cabin without tearing it apart or letting it fall further into the creek. Jacking it up is one thing but someone must put their life in danger and crawl under the cabin when it's caught on the old foundations and frozen solid dirt and the cabin won't budge. Chris and Jessi are struggling with the necessities of life in their frozen environment. Having an outdoor bucket shower when the water is hot when you tip it over your head and frozen when it gets down to your feet is not feasible anymore. Chris and Jessi spend a valuable day they could otherwise be out hunting for food to build a rugged outdoor bath house containing a stove for heating and a tub to bath in. Any material that they can find lying around in the area becomes fair game for the floor, walls, roof and door of the new bath house.
49	7	"The Edge"	April 22, 2016
Pat and Courtney arrive at the goat pen to find one of the goats has escaped. With thick snow on the ground and half-frozen rivers the goat won't last long in the cold and predators looking for an easy kill. They spot the trail the goat left in the fresh snow but it leads to a half-frozen river. If they don't find and catch this runaway Pat's experiment with goats will be a complete disaster. Chris and Jessi are struggling each day to find enough to eat with nothing in reserve for the long winter months ahead they need a new approach and a new target species to hunt. Chris remembers a lake he used to hunt for beaver with his Dad when they were young so they decide to try to get there and set some traps. Unfortunately, as they close in on the hunting grounds they find a deep and un-traversable gully where Chris remembers there was only a small creek. Desperate to try to change their situation and open up new hunting grounds they decide to try to topple trees down across the ravine to build a bridge over it. With both of them scared of heights and a 35-foot drop to rocks and the creek below the task of bridge building takes on epic proportions. Charlie needs to go trapping to support his family through winter but doesn't have any fish he normally uses for bait because of the time he has spent due to the wildfires and helping village elders. He needs a new source and turns to the old ways to get bait for his traps but does he know enough and will work for him now.
50	8	"The Final Shot"	April 22, 2016
Charlie's mother-in-law does not have enough meat for the winter and asks Charlie if he will hunt a caribou for her. Charlie agrees knowing there are no caribou in the area, he will need to travel to the White Mountains far to the North if he hopes to be successful. Alone on the mountains and 100 miles from home Charlie's snow machine breaks down making the situation perilous. He gets caught in whiteout conditions when the weather quickly changes and must quickly descend to the lowlands. Charlie refuses to give up and is determined to return home successful. Failure is not an option for Charlie. Now desperate for meat and Chris losing a lot of body weight since leaving Manley Hot Springs for this subsistence lifestyle Chris and Jessi have no other options than to hunt for bears in their territory. With both of them relatively inexperienced in hunting bears the personal danger couldn't be higher. Tramping through thigh-deep snow searching for dens in the sides of hills that might contain more than one bear becomes a life and death situation but they have no other choice. After finding an empty hole they find another one with all the signs that something is indeed alive and inside. Eventually, they agree that one of them has to go inside and check. Jessi knows it's up to her as she wouldn't be strong enough to pull Chris out if he needs to be. Courageously Jessi crawls into the bear den up to her ankles and finds yes it does have at least one bear in it. With fresh snow on the ground, Stan decides there is no other option for his family than for him to live at the Tozi River cabin through winter as it is the only area where trapping is now possible due to the recent wildfires. He says goodbye to his family and heads off with his team of dogs. Unfortunately, he doesn't even make it to the 12-mile cabin before the deep snow makes it impossible for the dogs to continue. Stan has to return to Tanana. In Tanana Stan enlists the help of Joey to try to cut the track through to the Tozi River cabin so that the dogs can follow later. They both set off in snowmobiles but find the journey difficult and later on dangerous as they try to make it to the cabin before nightfall.

=== Season 7 (2017) ===
No. overall	No. in season	Title	Original release date
51	1	"The Road"	April 21, 2017
It's the short moose hunting season again for the villagers and Charlie heads off to Adams Lake far away from the new road to Tanana in the hopes of avoiding any outsiders encroaching on traditional hunting grounds. He spends days there and with no signs of any moose there decides he must leave and try somewhere else. Back in Tanana, he seeks out James to ask him if he will go with him to hunt moose at Fish Lake, James agrees. After first trying South of Fish Lake and finding nothing they decide to head East to the Outer Lakes. There they shoot at but miss a big bull moose and the hunt is on. At night they see a fire from outsiders also hunting on their traditional sacred hunting grounds around Fish Lake. They decide to put their own fire out and hunker down until morning. In the morning they continue to pursue the moose they shot at the day before. Before long they find a strange trail made by a 4-wheel drive motorbike and realise they are quite close to the new road. They decide to follow the track to see where it leads but what they find disgusts them. They find a recently used campsite with empty beer bottles and trash left strewn around but the worst thing they find is the mutilated carcass of the bull moose they were hunting. It could have been used to keep a whole extended family alive during winter but instead, it was hunted only as a trophy and the remains of the carcass left to rot on the ground. After a successful season fishing with the fish wheel at his fish camp Stan leaves for the trip back to Tanana. As he passes by the end of the new road he sees many boats and vehicles of the outsiders parked at the edge of the river. He also sees the antlers of a moose being taken out of a boat and put in a trailer towed by a vehicle. What he sees alarms him and he will discuss it with the other villagers when he gets back to Tanana. Courtney and her young daughter go moose hunting at Nowitna River. While they are there she hears shots from another nearby hunter she suspects is an outsider. She decides to leave as the situation is now too dangerous for both herself and her daughter. The next day she returns but to a different area in the Nowitna River as she needs to find a moose for her family to get them through winter. The same thing happens as the day before, she hears shots nearby and decides it's too dangerous and leaves the area. Stan and a young man from the village called Albert go to get water from a village spring Stan rigged up about 20 years ago. After collecting some water from it the spring stops flowing and they discover it has dried up. Stan and Albert then go on a hunt close to Stan's house where he thinks there might be another spring. Albert takes a shovel and ever resourceful Stan brings a doctor's stethoscope. After digging a few holes and Stan listening through the stethoscope they find a promising spring. Unfortunately, there is a hill between the spring and Stan's house but that's no problem for Stan. They pull a water line over the hill and at Stan's house, Stan makes a water pump out of bits and pieces of old machinery and motors he has lying around his yard. After filling up a temporary reservoir with water Stan pumps the water from the temporary reservoir back up the water pipe over the hill to the spring. Then when Stan disconnects the pump from the water pipe, the water then reverses in the water pipe dragging water back down the line over the hill from the spring to Stan's house. All Stan has to do then is to collect the spring water and people can start to use it.
52	2	"Bloodlines"	April 28, 2017
With winter approaching Chris and Jessi need to hunt for food. They go to the river to hunt grouse but the grouse are on the other side and the time spent yields little reward, they have to come up with a different target species. They see beaver swimming in the river but if they can shoot one it will just sink and they won't be able to retrieve it. Back in civilisation, Jessi was a competition bow hunter and she brings her bow with her. Unfortunately, when they left Manley Hot Springs they forgot to bring any arrows. Chris has an idea when he finds an old bicycle frame but no wheels or chains. That's no problem for Chris and he goes about building it into a lathe. Using the crank from the bike frame and one person turning it by hand they connect a fairly straight branch of a tree and start whittling it down to the diameter of the shaft of an arrow. Next, they make the tip from broken glass and the arrow flights from grouse feathers. Fixing a line to the arrow will enable them to retrieve the game they've shot. All they need to do now is hunt a beaver in the wild which is easier said than done. Charlie needs to get his trap line and sets ready for trapping season when his 2 daughters Teneshia and Geneva come home from college for a long weekend with Teneshia's new boyfriend Curtis. This is the first time Charlie has met Curtis and now he has to contend with another alpha male in his eldest daughter's life. Charlie decides the best way to deal with the situation is if they both go up the frozen Yukon River on quad bikes to check the trap line before the season starts. Curtis has some previous experience trapping with his father. It all starts out very nicely but as soon as the pressure comes on and unexpected things start to go wrong they go from bad to worse. Can Charlie and Curtis work together to make things right or is this the start of a bad situation for both of them? Pat and Lorraine fly to Fairbanks for a routine doctor's appointment due to Lorraine's health leaving Courtney behind to look after the dogs. Unfortunately, the appointment turns into emergency surgery and with Lorraine's fragile health, there is concern that she might not even make it through. Pat, Courtney and Thomas are all left wondering what is going to happen.
53	3	"Boiling Point"	May 5, 2017
It's the first day of the trapping season but this season there is very little snow on the ground and not enough for Stan to use the sled for his dogs to pull. This is no problem for Stan as he has an old stripped-down car chassis with no motor, gearbox, transmission, doors, windows, boot, bonnet, roof, or body panels. It's just a bare frame, a car seat, a steering wheel, 4 wheels and a hand brake. The dogs are quite happy to tow this down the roads but things get a bit sticky when they try to drive on the tighter trails of Stan's trap line. The car body is not too good at staying on the trail and slides off on corners into trees. It's not working and Stan can't continue trapping until there is more snow as there is not enough snow even for a snowmobile even if Stan owned one which he doesn't. Charlie heads out for the first day of the trapping season on his quad bike up the Yukon River. After a day of setting and baiting his traps, he returns back down the same way and finds that during the day someone has been following him and setting their traps right next to his traps. He also finds a recent campsite with a fireplace and trash left lying about. Charlie realises that an outsider from the new road is encroaching on his territory. Charlie is incredulous but knowing how situations can quickly become volatile he seeks out a wise elder, his friend Stan, to discuss what to do. Together they know that it's no use trying to reason with this outsider as they perceive this person has no respect for the environment, the river, other people or ancestral trapping lines. Together Charlie and Stan come up with a plan for Charlie to continue to trap in the same area but it's going to take a lot of hard work to set it up. Charlie asks Stan if he will help him which Stan agrees to do until there is enough snow for Stan to start trapping on his own line. After a lot of hard work, they complete what they started but will it be good enough for Charlie to trap the Martin before they get to the outsiders' traps? As a right of passage, Courtney takes his young daughter out on the first day of the trapping season to set the trap line. They set out on a quad bike because the lack of snow makes it impossible for them to use a dog team. After a day of Courtney teaching and showing her daughter how to set up baits, snares and traps they get to the end of their ancestral trap line. Unfortunately at that point, the quad bike has an irreparable breakage and they are forced to make a decision of whether or not to walk the 12 miles back home or try to survive the cold of the night. Because of Courtney's daughter's age and being unable to make the 12-mile walk back at night and in the cold they are forced to spend the night out in the open. It ends up being a hard lesson in survival.
54	4	"Less Than Zero"	May 12, 2017
With a sudden cold snap and temperatures quickly plummeting to minus 35 degrees Fahrenheit (minus 37 degrees Celsius) the villagers are scrambling to adapt. Charlie is suddenly called to his sister-in-law's house where the wood stove for heating and cooking has a chimney fire. When Charlie gets there the smoke alarms go off full noise and the house is full of smoke. With the chimney flue burning on the inside and getting hotter threatening to burn down the house, quick thinking Charlie gets a bucket of water and a large roll of kitchen paper towels. He puts the whole roll of paper towels into the bucket of water so the roll of paper towels is totally saturated with water then opens the front door of the wood stove puts the wet roll of paper towels in and closes the wood stove door. Instantly the water in the roll of paper towels starts to produce lots of steam which eventually puts out the fire in the chimney flue. Charlie saves the day and the house from burning down to the ground. After the fire is out an inspection shows that the stove has a large crack in it allowing lots of air to get in and also not allowing the air flow to the fire to be controlled or slowed down. The wood stove needs to be replaced today with no delay, due to the extreme cold snap. There are no Home Depot or other home improvement stores in Tanana with new wood stoves in stock just waiting for someone to walk in and buy so where can they get one quickly? The search is on, but will they find something today and get it installed and working before the big freeze after dark? Chris and Jessi come up with a plan so they don't have to burn precious fuel on the snowmobile hauling wood to the cabin so they get a young sled dog to help. Although the dog has been bred to pull it is young and never had any experience pulling anything or even wearing a harness. Younger dogs are usually harnessed into a dog team and learn by following the other dogs but not in this case. First, they set to and stitch a harness together from what they have then they have to teach the dog what to do. However, the dog is too young and unsettled. Eventually, the dog breaks free from the lead Chris is holding and runs off at full speed towing an empty plastic sled. Full of fear the young dog runs away, disappearing at full speed into the woods thinking it is being chased by the plastic sled. Chris and Jessi are very worried for the dog's safety in the woods and go off after it. After an hour of searching and calling for the dog, they find the empty sled caught up in bushes with a broken tow rope and the dog nowhere to be found. They know they can't give up the search as the dog won't survive the cold of night but with the dark approaching will they succeed in finding it alive? The cold snap catches Stan off guard and he needs a load of hay for his dogs to sleep on so they don't freeze at night. He gets in his truck to go get it but after starting it the engine makes a lot of noise. Stan diagnoses the problem as a broken piston that if he keeps the engine going will eventually wear a hole in the body of the engine. The engine is toast until it can be repaired and so Stan is without a truck to get the hay for the dogs. Stan has another truck but it has a cracked transmission housing and with every bump in the road the housing would eventually completely fail and the transmission just fall down and come apart. That's no problem for resourceful Stan, he drills a couple of holes in the chassis of the truck on each side of the cracked transmission housing and bolts a length of 2 by 6 timber under the truck on each side supporting the transmission. Sure he knows it might not last very long but it's better than not having the support timber there. Stan and a teenager from the village, Albert load up and head off to Oscar Lake where they hope to get the hay for Stan's dogs. Unfortunately on the rough trail down from the road to the lake, the truck breaks through the thin ice covering a deep pothole and the truck gets stuck. That's no problem for Stan as he has a winch on hand to winch the truck out. The truck is stuck badly on the steep track and the hand winch is not enough to pull the truck up the hill out of the pothole. Albert is tasked with going back to Stan's house to get more gear to pull the truck free. While Albert is gone Stan builds a fire with the temperature at minus 35 degrees Fahrenheit thinking it might be a long night and darkness approaching. Before long Albert shows how responsible he is and shows up with lots of gear and his 2 friends, Alan and Hunter. Stan now has lots of help and all the gear he needs to get the truck out so he sets about teaching the teenagers some tricks and things to be careful of when using a block and tackle but will he have time to get the hay he needs for his dogs before it gets dark?
55	5	"Running on Empty"	May 19, 2017
The days are getting desperate for the residents of Tanana after the wildfires destroyed the surrounding forests. Neither Charlie, Stan, James or Pat were able to shoot a moose for their respective families during the hunting season. As a result, all of their families and their extended families in Tanana may suffer the consequences in the coming dark days unless they can get enough food from other sources. Charlie goes to see Stan to ask him if he will go with him to hunt caribou on 4-wheel drive quad bikes. There is not enough snow yet this year for Stan to go trapping but Stan doesn't own a quad bike as he's never needed one before so Charlie offers Stan his wife's one to use. Together they set off to 14 mile cabin to hunt. They see nothing on the first day and stay at the cabin overnight. In the morning Stan's quad bike won't start because the cold has frozen the starter motor. They build a small fire on a snow shovel and when it's down to coals put it under the quad bike trying not to set the quad bike on fire. This thaws out the starter motor and they can start the hunt for the day. Later that day they decide to split up to cover more ground and hopefully flush the caribou out of the wooded areas. Charlie goes to the hilltops and Stan goes into the valleys. However, Stan gets into a bit of trouble in the valleys and rolls the quad bike down a hill. Is this the end of the hunt and the bike and will Charlie be able to find Stan? Pat has a plan to get through winter and his son-in-law turns up with the gift of some young piglets for Pat. Pat has never raised pigs before and soon finds out they eat a lot. Pretty soon Pat is running low on food for the pigs but shows he's not too proud to go to the Tanana dump and search through it for food scraps that people have thrown away. Every day he can feed them they get a little bit bigger to help get Pat and his family through the dark days of winter. Chris and Jessi are in a daily struggle to get enough food knowing the dark days of winter are coming. Together they decide that even though the river is frozen they might still be able to put in the fishing net they brought with them but haven't used yet. They head down to the river to check the ice is thick enough for them to work on. They find some parts are but some parts are not. Chris has an idea to build a timber raft to spread their weight when walking on the parts of the ice that are thin. Then they have to cut holes in the ice and thread the net under the ice from one hole to the other but will they end up with a catch?
56	6	"Art of the Eel"	May 26, 2017
There's hardly any snow on the ground but Stan has a plan to get to the start of his trap line. He harnesses his dog team up to his truck and loads his sled onto the back of the truck then his dogs pull the truck down the road to the start of his trap line. Stan is in his happy place when at last he can start trapping for the first time in the season. Stan's dogs have been pent up for a long time waiting for the season to start and have too much energy and just want to run. Unfortunately when Stan is just a few feet off the trail setting up a trap the anchor on the sled holding the dog's back breaks free under the constant pulling and jumping from the dogs. The dogs and sled disappear down the trail, away and over the horizon and out of sight leaving Stan yelling and running after them. Evidently, this is not the first time this sort of mishap has occurred to Stan and he knows with the dogs the way they are and this being their first run of the season the only way the dogs are going to stop running is if the sled gets caught up and jams on something. Pat and James both don't have enough food to get their dogs through winter and have decided to team up. James has a contact in Grayling 300 miles away that has agreed to show them where they might be able to catch lamprey eels. To get there they need to buy return airfares for themselves and all the gear they will need. It's a risk they both need to take knowing it's only a 20-minute pulse that if they miss will leave them with nothing. They're met at the airport by locals Marvin and Garett who take them to where they need to be without intruding on other locals' ancestral hunting areas. James and Pat take only one chainsaw to cut through the thick ice and when the chain on the saw freezes up they spend valuable time building a fire to try to thaw it out. When they finally get the holes cut they get the disappointing news that the pulse has already gone past them. With so much at stake they decide to try to travel further up the river to get ahead of the pulse, cut the holes and be ready before the pulse gets there but will they be successful on their second attempt? Chris and Jessi are using a candle and kerosene lamps to try to find and plug draughts in their log cabin to keep it warmer. The dimness of the lamps is frustrating and they need a source of electricity so they can recharge headlamp batteries and lights in the house at night. Chris has an idea to build a steam generator out of an old compressor tank that is lying in the yard. The idea is to fill the tank halfway with water and build a fire under it so the water in the tank boils producing steam under pressure. This pressure steam is then directed to a wheel on a turbine connected to an old chainsaw motor turning a generator inside the shell of an old battery-powered hand drill which is wired in reverse to an old car battery.
57	7	"Dog Days of Winter"	June 2, 2017
Charlie goes to the village water plant because of an alarm alert and finds there are only 4 more days of water in the tanks for the village. If he can't get enough water for the plant within that time the water will stop recirculating and the pipes will freeze causing damage and they won't have water again all Winter until the pipes and the ground thaw again in Spring making repairs possible. With so many people in the village relying on the water plant Charlie has to find out why there is not enough water and get more water somehow. When Charlie visits the end of the pipe at the Yukon River he finds that due to the lack of snow this year the ice at the banks of the river is thicker so the streams of water under the ice are further from the bank of the river. Charlie finds they don't have any more lengths of the specially insulated pipe needed so he calls the supplier in Fairbanks to get some more brought out on the new road. A day later Charlie gets a call from the delivery truck driver that he cannot get to the end of the road because there are significant snow drifts in some parts making it impossible. Charlie gets the truck driver to unload the pipe on the side of the road but it is still 25 miles away from Tanana, on the other side of the Yukon River. Charlie now has 3 days left before it will be too late. Charlie goes to visit Stan to ask him if he would consider taking a dog team to go and get the pipe, Stan agrees and sets off the next morning. Stan knows he only has 2 days left to get the pipe back to the village. After a long journey, Stan gets to where the pipe is and begins the trip back, he finds one of his dogs has a bleeding foot and it's getting dark and cold and there are no survival cabins yet on the new road. Stan knows he has no option but to stop for the night with no shelter for him or his dogs and try and make it back on the final day before the village runs out of water but will he make it through the night and make it back to Tanana towing a long pipe behind the sled in the morning? Chris and Jessi Morse are excited because Chris's father Stuart is coming to visit them at their cabin. Stuart built the cabin over one summer in the early 1970s and Chris and Jessie are keen to prove they are going to be successful living there. Chris and Stuart have a history of arguing when working together on projects so when Stuart sees that they have food unprotected from bears near the house they all come up with the idea of building a cache platform 12 feet above the ground so that bears won't be able to get it. There are some disagreements on the design of the platform. Can they put their differences aside and work together on this project or is the platform going to add more stress and difficulties to the relationship between Chris and his father Stuart?
58	8	"Escape Plan"	June 9, 2017
After a terrible trapping season and his trap lines getting compromised by outsiders Charlie decides he has no other option but to travel further away from Tanana and build a new trapping line in a country where no one has trapped before. He feels very disappointed that after more than 100 years of his trapping line being in his family and being passed down from generation to generation, he has to abandon it but feels he has no other option. Charlie sets off with his son Bob on snowmobiles to go 30 miles down the Yukon River to The Kallands to build the new trap line. On their way down the Yukon River Bob crashes his snowmobile and is trapped under it for a while causing Charlie to worry given that only recently Bob crashed a snowmobile and broke both his legs and one of his arms. Bob also damages the sled he is towing in the crash. Will this expedition to break new ground and establish a new trap line for the family be a success or a complete waste of effort? Stan knows that the new road hasn't got any survival cabins yet as he previously found out on his last trip and so he decides to build one inside the Tanana Fire Station, he is the Tanana Fire Chief after all. He then needs to tow it to where it is needed on the other side of the Yukon River. As you know Stan is very resourceful so it's not a matter of if the cabin will get to where it needs to be but what are the problems Stan will overcome getting it there and what ingenious solutions will he use on the way. Chris and Jessi wake up after a hurricane-force storm the night before to find the food cache platform they just built was smashed by a falling tree in the storm leaving them with only 6 days of food supply left. After a brutally honest evaluation, they decide they have no other option than to try to make a run for civilisation knowing if they stay and run out of food they will die. They pack up everything they can carry and leave the cabin the next morning. Unfortunately, they know they have only 5 gallons of fuel for the snowmobile which won't be enough but they think they will take the snowmobile until it runs out of fuel and walk from there. Chris finds an old map and works out it is 17 miles overland to the Tanana River and a further 8 miles across land without a track to the new road where they hope to find someone to pick them up and take them to Tanana one way or Manley Hot Springs the other way. Unfortunately, the storm a couple of nights before dumped a lot of fresh snow and made snowdrifts causing them to travel a lot slower and using up more gasoline than they wanted. Chris is on the snowmobile and Jessi is sitting on a plastic sled holding their dog Tozi. As you can imagine Chris is working hard balancing and riding the snowmobile and Jessi is just sitting for hours. They finally run out of fuel after only a few miles and many hours with the short day ending and the long night starting. At that stage, Jessi has been sitting down for hours and has become too cold and has lost the feeling in both her feet. They take one of her socks off to try to warm her foot up and find the toes have gone white. They know that the next stage is that the nerves in her toes die from lack of blood circulation and she gets frostbite in her feet. The episode finishes with the sun setting and night beginning and the air temperature at -52 degrees Fahrenheit (-46 degrees Celsius). Chris and Jessie are stuck out in the open in the middle of nowhere in the freezing cold, with many miles still to go to get to the Tanana River and 8 miles past the river to the new road. They hope they can get rescued by someone driving on the road. At this stage, they are in real danger and no one to help them.
59	9	"End of the Road"	June 16, 2017
Charlie Wright seeks help from a local gold miner to repair his bear-ravaged cabin, getting an unexpected chance. Stan Zuray struggles to reach the new road with his survival cabin. The Morse’s search for salvation turns into a fight for their lives.
