= Coregonus fontanae =

Conservation status
- Critically Endangered (IUCN 3.1)

Scientific classification
- Kingdom: Animalia
- Phylum: Chordata
- Class: Actinopterygii
- Order: Salmoniformes
- Family: Salmonidae
- Genus: Coregonus
- Species: C. fontanae

Binomial name
- Coregonus fontanae M. Schulz and Freyhof, 2003

Species of fish

Coregonus fontanae, also known as the Stechlin cisco, Fontane cisco, or Fontane's cisco, is a putative species of freshwater whitefish in the family Salmonidae endemic to the Großer Stechlinsee in northern Germany. It is believed to have recently evolved from the sympatric vendace, Coregonus albula.

== Description ==
Coregonus fontanae is highly dwarfed, and is believed to be the world's smallest type of cisco. The maximum length recorded for this species is 12.6 centimetres (5.0 in), and 10 centimetres (3.9 in) is believed to be a typical size. Stechlin ciscoes are silvery pink in body color, with a bluish-brown back and glassy fins.

The Stechlin cisco is taxonomically distinguished from the vendace and the other dwarfed cisco species by its low number of lateral line scales (69–77), by some bodily proportions, by the length of its gill rakers, by its slow growth, by its glassy fins, and by its spring spawning season.

== Taxonomy and evolution ==
The existence of two forms of vendace-like whitefish in Lake Stechlin was noted by G. Bauch in 1953 and A. K. Awand and colleagues in the 1990s. During Maurice Kottelat and Jörg Freyhof's survey of the freshwater fish of Europe, the taxonomic status of the deviating form was more closely examined, and Freyhof with M. Schulz described it as a separate species on the basis of its spring spawning season and small size. They named it in honor of German literary figure Theodor Fontane, whose last completed novel, Der Stechlin, used Lake Stechlin's landscape as a backdrop.

The Stechlin cisco represents the extreme of a pattern of cisco adaptive radiations into dwarf, spring-spawning, cold-tolerant forms in northern European lakes after the last glacial period 12,000 years ago. The results of this evolution in various lakes were formerly considered to be single species, Coregonus trybomi, but mitochondrial DNA, allozyme and microsatellite DNA studies show that the spring-spawning populations in various lakes each evolved independently from the vendace. Another similar pair is found in the German lake Breiter Luzin, 30 kilometres (19 mi) from the Großer Stechlinsee, involving C. albula and Coregonus lucinensis. Genetic differences between the sympatric morphs within each German lake, and between populations of different lakes, are minimal.

== Distribution ==
This species is restricted to the Großer Stechlinsee (also called Lake Stechlin), near the town of Stechlin in the north of Brandenburg state in Germany. Lake Stechlin is a deep, cool, chalky, oligotrophic lake of recent glacial origin. Lake Stechlin has an area of 4.3 square kilometres (1.7 sq mi) and reaches a maximum depth of 68 metres (223 ft) and a mean depth of 22.8 metres (75 ft). In Lake Stechlin, this species and the vendace (Coregonus albula) make up 95 percent of the fish biomass. Lake Stechlin is part of Stechlin-Ruppiner Land Nature Park. The IUCN Red List considers the species to be Critically Endangered.

== Ecology ==
Stechlin ciscoes feed primarily on cladocerans and copepods. They are found throughout the lake, though they are generally pelagic in cool, deep water. They differ little in dietary preferences from the sympatric vendace, but they differ substantially in habitat. They live to be four to five years old, and spawn in the spring, unlike the vendace. They have been found to have a reduced metabolic rate as an adaptation to their habitat.
