= Montreal River (Saskatchewan) =

River in Saskatchewan, Canada

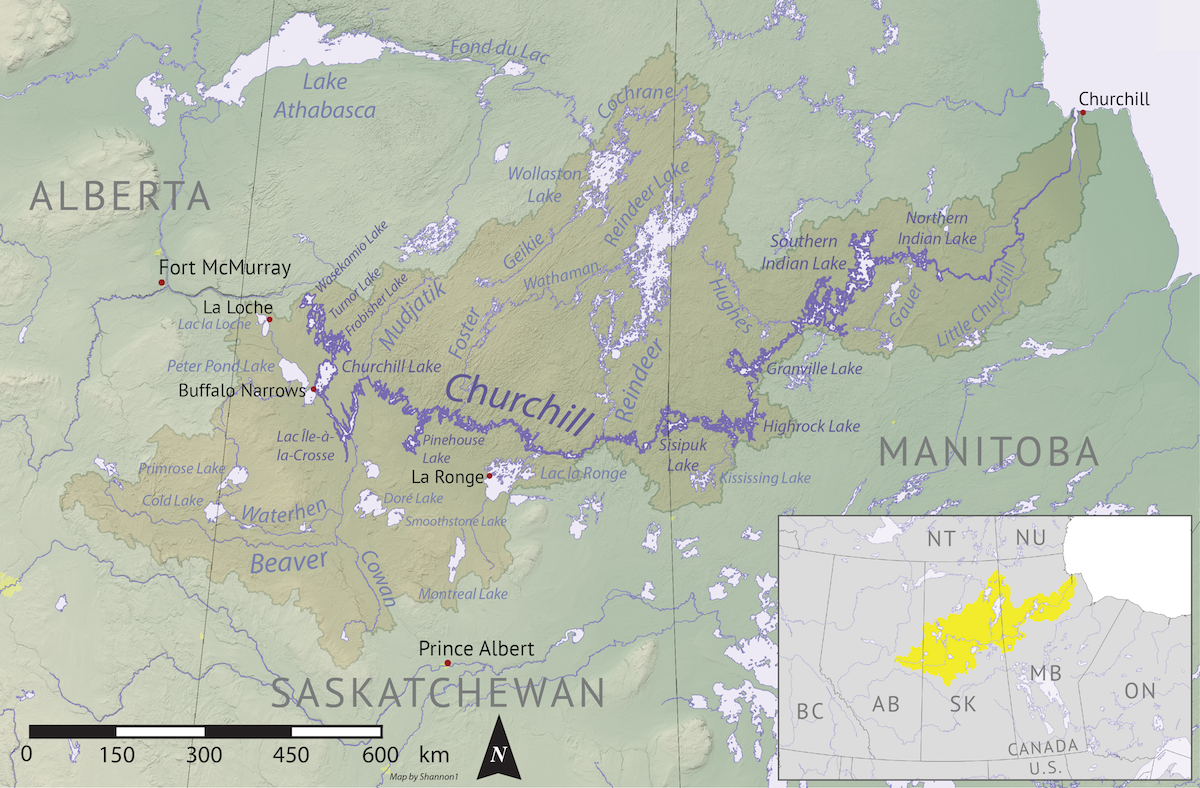
- Churchill River drainage basin

- Location of the mouth of the Montreal River in Saskatchewan Montreal River (Saskatchewan) (Canada)
- Etymology: City of Montreal

Location
- Country: Canada
- Province: Saskatchewan
- Census division: Division No. 18

Physical characteristics
- Source: Montreal Lake
  - coordinates: 54°32′32″N 105°35′57″W
  - elevation: 489 m (1,604 ft)
- Mouth: Lac la Ronge
  - location: La Ronge
  - coordinates: 55°05′00″N 105°19′02″W
  - elevation: 356 m (1,168 ft)
- Length: 100 km (62 mi)

Basin features
- Progression: Lac la Ronge; Rapid River; Churchill River; Hudson Bay
- River system: Churchill River drainage basin
- Tributaries
  - right: McIllree River
- Waterbodies: Partridge Crop Lake; Sikachu Lake; Egg Lake; Bigstone Lake

Montreal River is a river in the Canadian province of Saskatchewan. The river was named after the city of Montreal. It flows 100 kilometres (62 mi) from Montreal Lake to Lac la Ronge and is part of the Churchill River and Hudson Bay drainage basins. Along its course, Montreal River runs through boreal forests, muskeg, and glacier formed valleys. Within its watershed are the Waskesiu Uplands, much of Prince Albert National Park, and several notable lakes, such as Waskesiu, Kingsmere, Crean, Weyakwin, and Bittern.

== Course ==
Montreal River begins at Montreal Lake 5 kilometres (3.1 mi) north of the community of Molanosa and 4 kilometres (2.5 mi) west of Highway 969. It heads north and passes under at Highway 2 at the site of the Montreal River Recreation Site. The river continues north, passes under Highway 165, heads east through Partridge Crop Lake and Sikachu Lake and enters Egg Lake at Wawe Bay. It continues east through Bigstone Lake, passes again under Highway 2, and reaches its mouth at Lac la Ronge between the communities of La Ronge and Air Ronge.

== Montreal River Recreation Site ==
Montreal River Recreation Site (54.7209°N 105.6966°W) is a provincial recreation site along the course of the Montreal River. It is a small roadside pull-out campground off of Highway 2 with six campsites.

== Fish species ==
Fish species commonly found in the river include walleye, sauger, yellow perch, northern pike, lake trout, lake whitefish, cisco, burbot, white sucker, and longnose sucker.

== See also ==
- List of rivers of Saskatchewan
- Hudson Bay drainage basin
