= C. migratorius =

C. migratorius may refer to:

- Coregonus migratorius, a whitefish species
- Cricetulus migratorius, a rodent species

== See also ==
- Migratorius
