= Stechlin-Ruppiner Land Nature Park =

Nature park in Brandenburg, Germany

Coordinates: 53°06′13″N 13°03′01″E

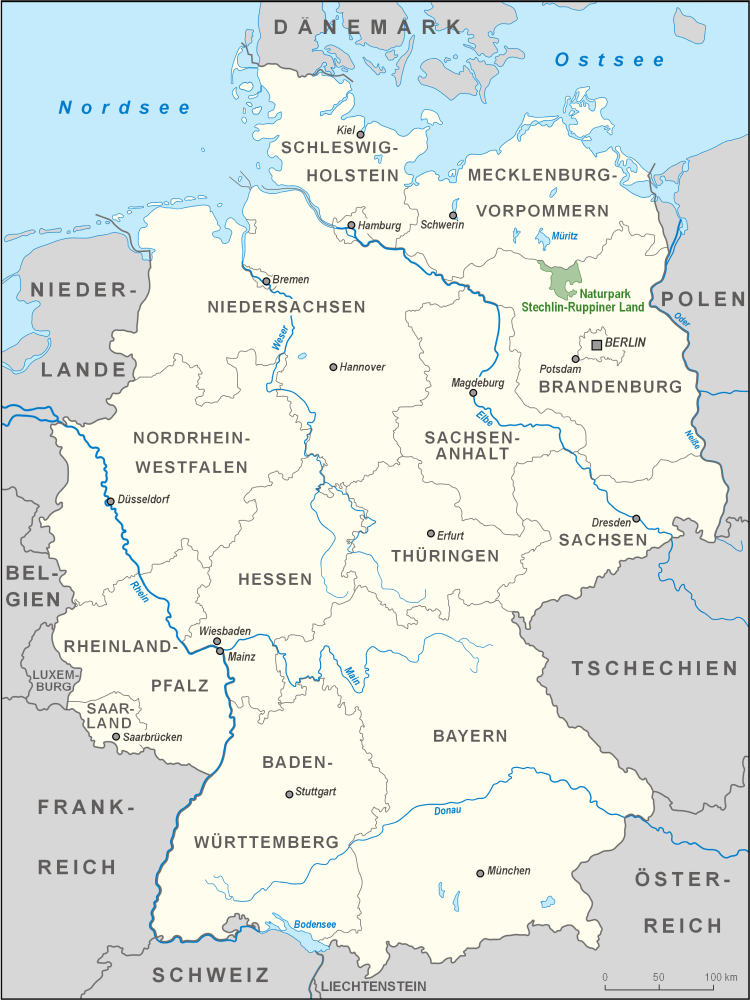

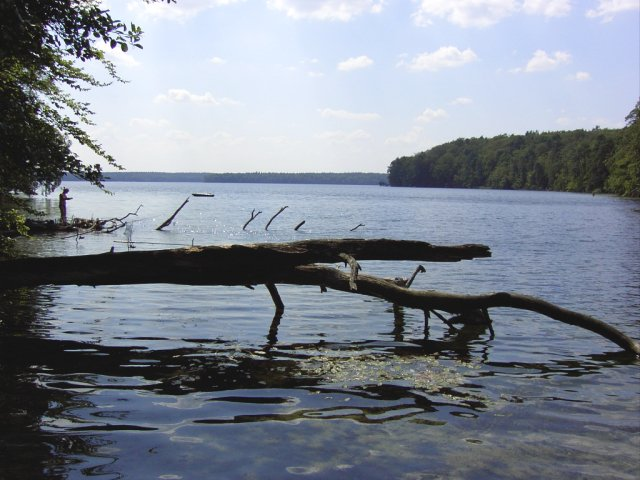

Stechlin-Ruppiner Land Nature Park is a nature park and reserve in the state of Brandenburg, Germany. It covers an area of 1,080 km^{2} (420 sq mi). It was established on July 1, 2001. It includes Lake Stechlin, home to the endemic Stechlin cisco.

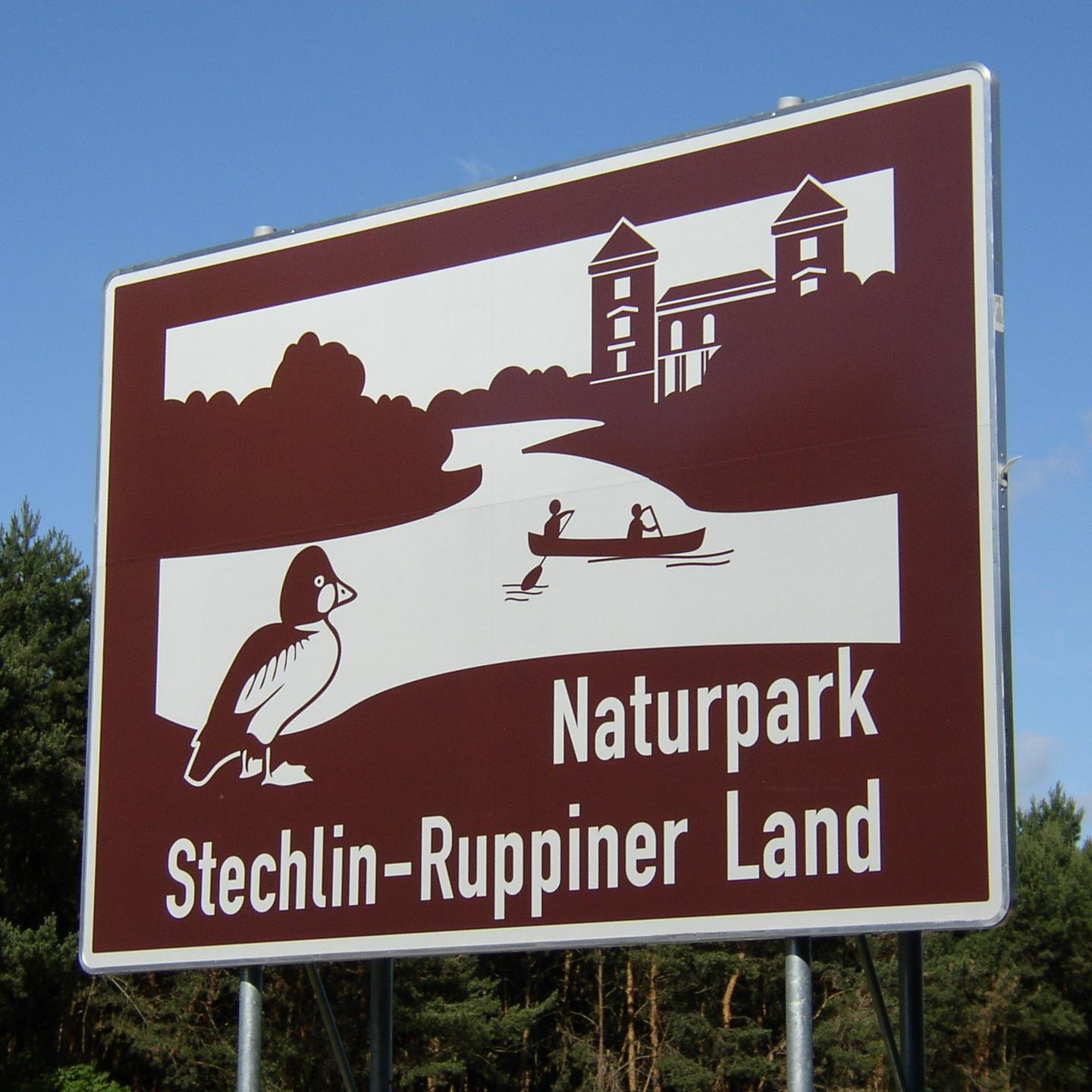
