= Egg Lake (Saskatchewan) =

Lake in Saskatchewan, Canada

- Location in Saskatchewan Egg Lake (Canada)
- Location: Northern Saskatchewan Administration District
- Coordinates: 55.0684°N 105.5479°W
- Type: Glacial lake
- Part of: Churchill River drainage basin
- Primary inflows: Montreal River
- River sources: Waskesiu Upland
- Primary outflows: Montreal River
- Basin countries: Canada
- Max. length: 16 km (10 mi)
- Max. width: 8.5 km (5.3 mi)
- Surface area: 10,762 ha (26,590 acres)
- Max. depth: 6 m (20 ft)
- Shore length^{1}: 126 km (78 mi)
- Settlements: None
- ^{1} Shore length is not a well-defined measure.

Egg Lake is a large, shallow lake in Northern Saskatchewan, Canada. It is along the course of the Montreal River about 17 kilometres (11 mi) west-southwest of La Ronge. The lake is surrounded by boreal forest and has a subarctic climate. There is no highway access and there are no communities at the lake.

== Description ==
Egg Lake covers and area of 10,762 hectares (26,590 acres), has a shoreline measuring 126 kilometres (78 mi), and is 6 metres (20 ft) deep. The lake is along the course of the Montreal River, which begins to the south at Montreal Lake. The river exits Egg Lake from the eastern shore where it flows through Bigstone Lake and then into Lac la Ronge. The south-easternmost point of Morin Lake Indian reserve borders the westernmost point of the lake at Wawe Bay.

== Fish species ==
Fish commonly found in Egg Lake include yellow perch, walleye, northern pike, cisco, lake whitefish, burbot, and white sucker. In 1982, the lake was stocked with 720,000 lake whitefish fry and 20,000 walleye fry.

== See also ==
- List of lakes of Saskatchewan
