= Kalix Löjrom =

Roe of Coregonus albula

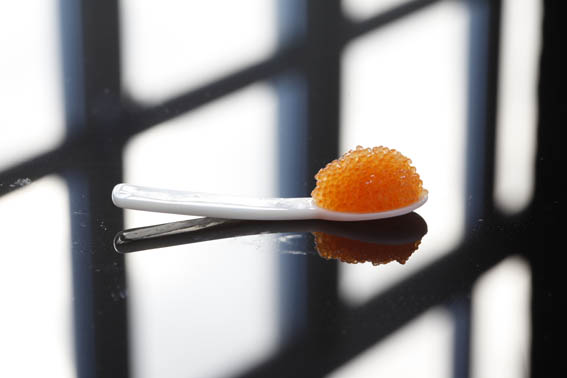
Kalix Löjrom

Kalix Löjrom is the designation of the roe of the small salmonid fish species vendace (Coregonus albula), harvested specifically from the Bothnian Bay archipelago of the Baltic Sea in northern Sweden. Since 2010 it has a status of Protected Designation of Origin (PDO) issued by the European Union, and is one of few Swedish products with the PDO status.

Kalix is a locality in Norrbotten County. The roe harvest normally starts late September and continues until the vendace are ready for spawning around late October.

For various reasons the roe has a more orange or red color than most vendace roe and the grains have a mild taste. Kalix Löjrom is often served at royal dinners and it is common on the Nobel Prize banquets. Kalix Löjrom means literally "Kalix vendace roe". It is marketed as "Caviar of Kalix".
