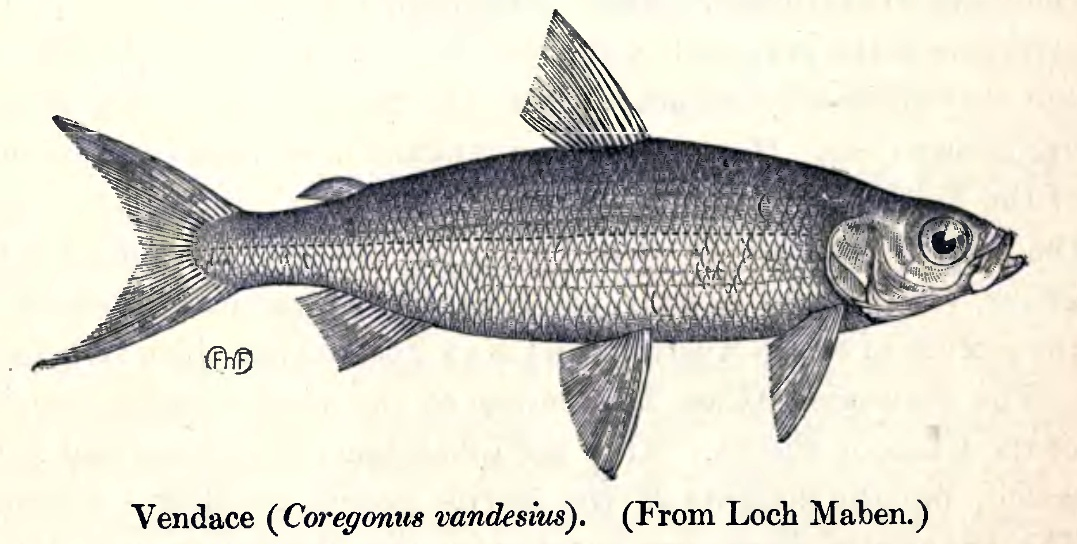

Conservation status
- Endangered (IUCN 3.1)

Scientific classification
- Kingdom: Animalia
- Phylum: Chordata
- Class: Actinopterygii
- Order: Salmoniformes
- Family: Salmonidae
- Genus: Coregonus
- Species: C. vandesius

Binomial name
- Coregonus vandesius (J. Richardson, 1836)

Synonyms
- Coregonus gracilior

= Coregonus vandesius =

Species of fish

Coregonus vandesius, the vendace /ˈvɛndeɪs/, is a freshwater whitefish found in the United Kingdom. Population surveys since the 1960s have revealed a steady decline, and the fish is no longer present in some of its previous habitats, but is still present in Bassenthwaite Lake and Derwent Water. The main threats it faces are eutrophication and the introduction of alien species of fish that eat its eggs and fry. The International Union for Conservation of Nature has rated its conservation status as "endangered".

== Taxonomy ==
Most authorities now consider Coregonus vandesius a subjective synonym of Coregonus albula, a more widespread North European freshwater whitefish species. Both taxa are also known by the common name vendace. The status, however, remains controversial, and FishBase still lists C. vandesius as a separate species reflecting the recent treatment of the European freshwater fish fauna by Kottelat & Freyhof (2007). Another synonym of British C. vandesius is C. gracilior.

The name "vendace" (Scots vengis, vangis, venace) is borrowed from Neo-Latin vandesius (which referred to the common dace Leuciscus leuciscus), from Middle French vandoise, vendese, vendoise, probably of Celtic origin; cf. Old Irish find "white."

== Biology ==
Coregonus vandesius inhabits deep, cold lakes and uses planktonic crustaceans, such as copepods, as its primary food source. The fish does not migrate and has a life span of about six years. The species is now Britain's rarest fish.

== Distribution and habitat ==
The vendace has only ever been known as a native species at four sites in Britain: Bassenthwaite Lake and Derwent Water in the English Lake District, and the Castle Loch and Mill Loch in Lochmaben, Scotland. The species was thought to have died out at all these sites except Derwent Water. The Castle Loch population disappeared in the early part of the 20th century, and the Mill Loch population disappeared in the 1990s. The fish had not been recorded at Bassenthwaite Lake since 2001, but was recently rediscovered in 2014. The decline is thought to be caused by predation by introduced species and by pollution. For example, a water treatment works near the lake had been overflowing with raw sewage at times of high water levels, causing severe algae blooms that were depleting the lake's oxygen supply, but the plant was to be renovated in 2004 to prevent this.

== Status ==
This fish has a restricted range, with a total area of occupancy of less than 500 km^{2} (190 mi^{2}). The current population trend is unknown, and the main threats are thought to be eutrophication and the introduction of alien species. The International Union for Conservation of Nature has rated its conservation status as being "endangered".

Coregonus vandesius was introduced to Loch Skeen in Dumfries and Galloway, Scotland, in the 1990s as an attempt at ex-situ conservation after the severity of habitat deterioration at Bassenthwaite was noticed. This has proved largely successful, and Loch Skeen now has nearly ten times the number of vendace per hectare as Derwent Water, according to a survey carried out by the Centre for Ecology and Hydrology. A population was also introduced into Sprinkling Tarn, a mountain tarn 10 miles from Derwentwater, in 2011, to attempt to create a refuge for the species in cooler water.
