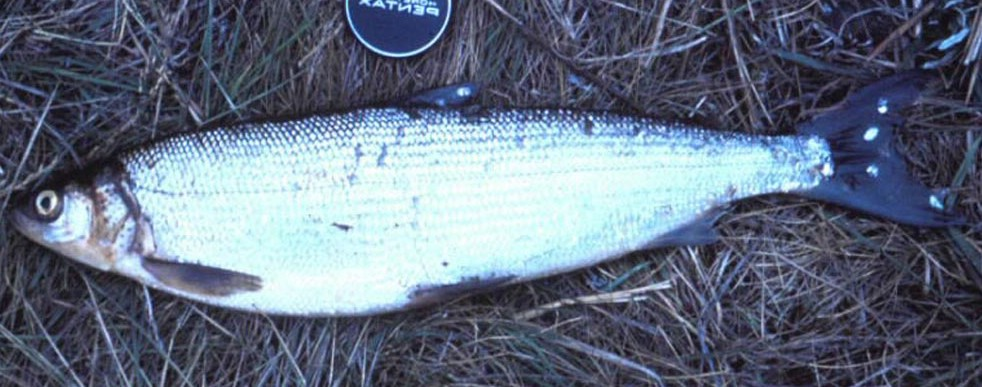

Conservation status
- Least Concern (IUCN 3.1)

Scientific classification
- Kingdom: Animalia
- Phylum: Chordata
- Class: Actinopterygii
- Order: Salmoniformes
- Family: Salmonidae
- Genus: Coregonus
- Species: C. sardinella

Binomial name
- Coregonus sardinella Valenciennes, 1848

= Coregonus sardinella =

Species of fish

Coregonus sardinella, known as the least cisco or the sardine cisco, is a fresh- and brackishwater salmonid fish that inhabits rivers, estuaries and coastal waters of the marginal seas of the Arctic Basin, as well as some large lakes of those areas.

In North America it is found from the Murchison River (Nunavut) west through the Bering Strait to the Bristol Bay (Bering Sea) in Alaska, and in the Russian Arctic from the northern part of the Bering Sea across the Siberian Arctic coast to the Kara Sea and Kara River and further to the Pechora River drainage on the European side. It has been introduced in some lakes and rivers in Uzbekistan and Kazakhstan.

Coregonus sardinella is closely related to the European cisco or vendace Coregonus albula, and also is close to the Siberian peled whitefish C. peled. Most recently, it has been argued to be the same species as the European cisco.
