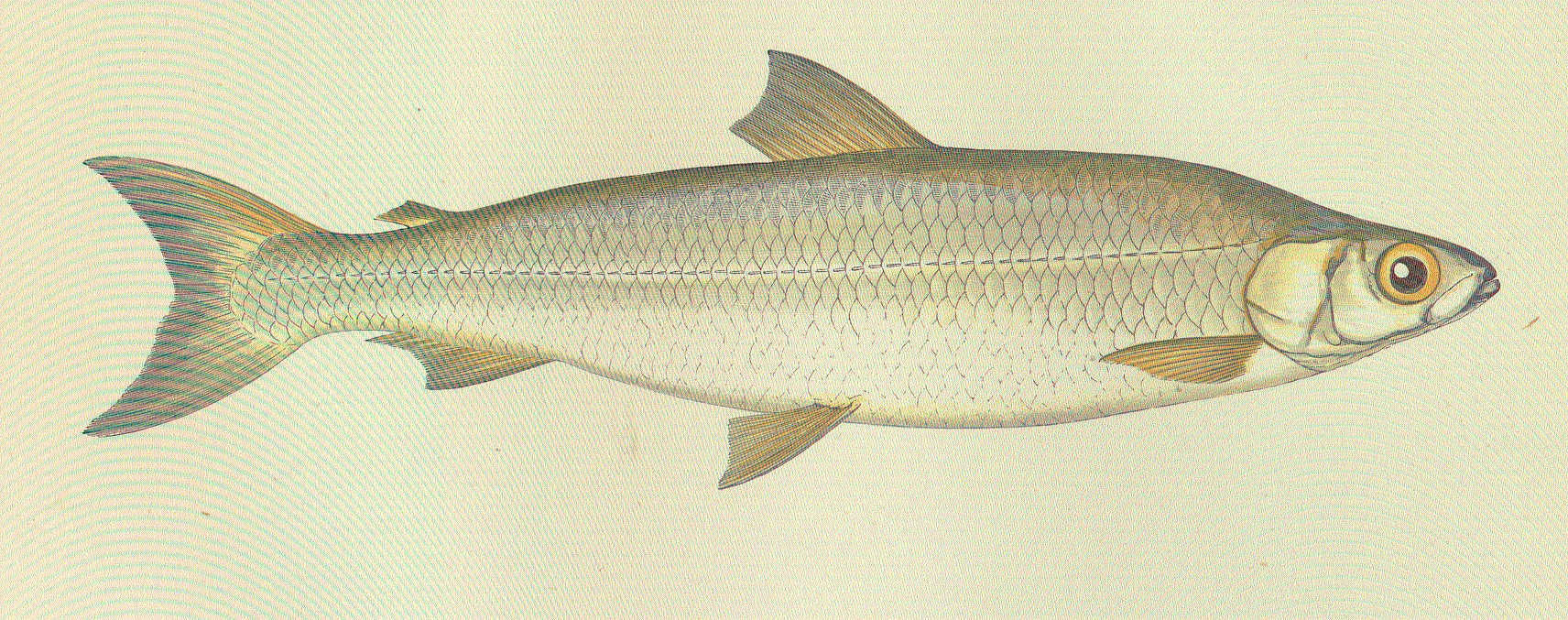

Conservation status
- Endangered (IUCN 3.1)
- VU (Irish Red List)

Scientific classification
- Kingdom: Animalia
- Phylum: Chordata
- Class: Actinopterygii
- Order: Salmoniformes
- Family: Salmonidae
- Genus: Coregonus
- Species: C. pollan

Binomial name
- Coregonus pollan W. Thompson, 1835

Synonyms
- Coregonus autumnalis pollan Thompson, 1835; Coregonus elegans Thompson, 1839; Coregonus altior Regan, 1908

= Pollan (fish) =

Species of fish

The pollan or Irish pollan (Coregonus pollan or Coregonus autumnalis) is a freshwater whitefish known only from five Irish lakes, Lough Neagh, Lower Lough Erne, Lough Ree, Lough Derg and Lough Allen. The pollan faces competition from introduced species such as pike, roach and zebra mussel, and the populations rely on restocking for survival.

== Conservation status ==
The pollan populations are threatened by ecosystem changes such as eutrophication and increases in species, including pike, roach and zebra mussel. Only the population of Lough Neagh in Northern Ireland remains abundant and supports a small commercial fishery. The other Northern Irish population in Lough Erne has severely declined. The Lough Allen population was only confirmed for the first time in 2006. Other populations rely on stocking for their survival.

== Description ==
The Irish pollan and other members of the Coregonus genus are very like herrings in appearance but the presence of an adipose fin distinguishes them. The mouth is relatively small and the teeth are deciduous and very small. The scales are of moderate size, the dorsal fin is of moderate length and the tail fin deeply forked. The different species are difficult to tell apart unless the lake from which they originated is known. This species grows to an average length of 9 to 10 in (22.9 to 25.4 cm) and a weight of 6 ounces (170 g).

== Ecology ==
The Irish pollan is a shoaling species. The diet consists small crustaceans and insect larvae. Breeding takes place in November and December, with spawning taking place over hard ground in deep water.

== Classification ==
In scientific literature and national biodiversity and conservation assessments, the Irish pollan are usually classified within the species Coregonus autumnalis. That is a widespread anadromous whitefish which inhabits coastal waters and rivers of Arctic Siberia, Alaska, and Canada and is there known as the Arctic cisco or Siberian omul. C. autumnalis is not distributed elsewhere in northwestern Europe, and the pollan are often given a status of subspecies as Coregonus autumnalis pollan. These classifications are based on the close genetic similarity of the Arctic and Irish whitefish populations. By IUCN and in the FishBase, the Irish pollan is, however, listed as a distinct fish species Coregonus pollan.

Unlike its Arctic relatives, the Irish pollan does not migrate to the sea.
