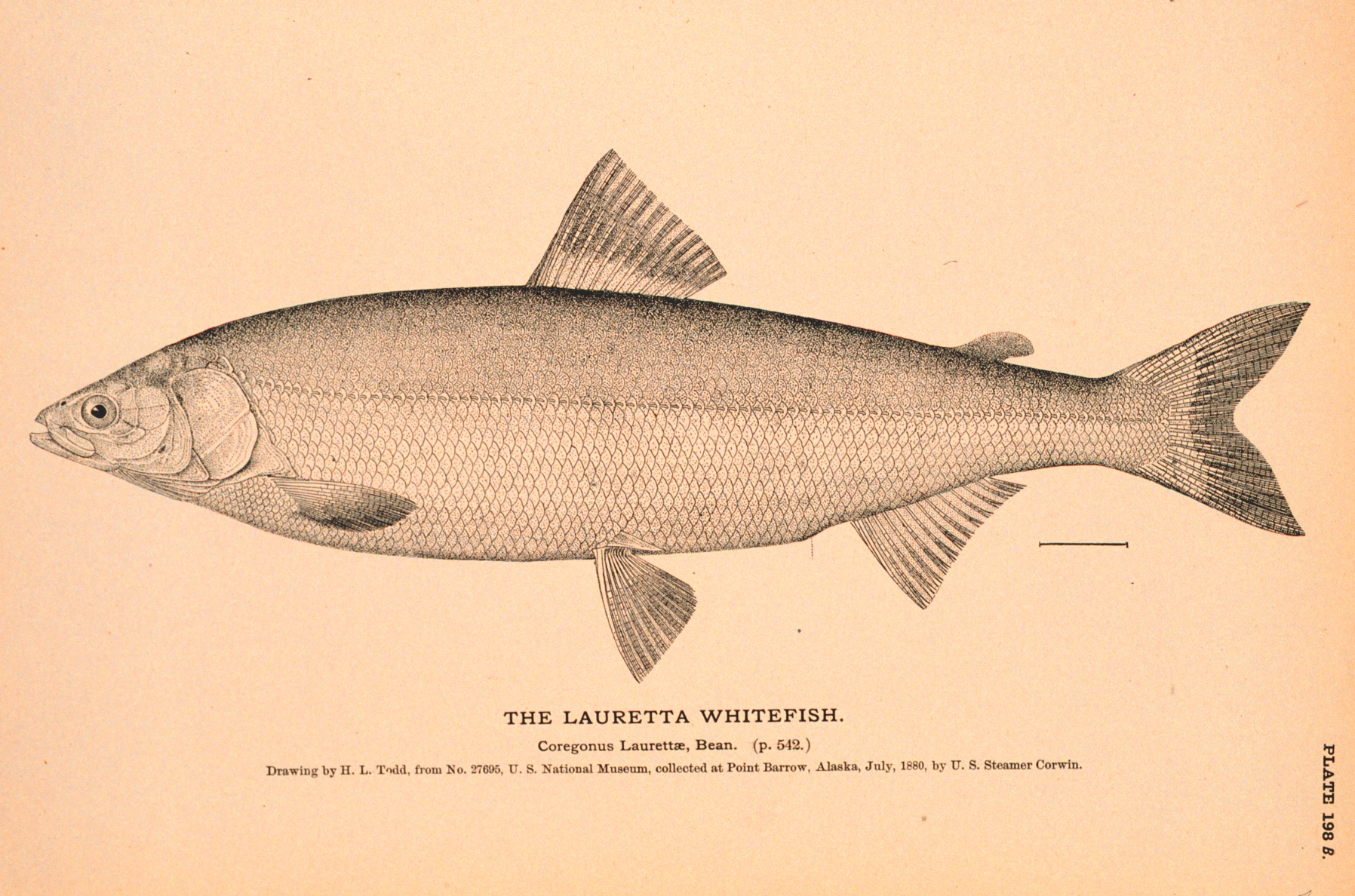
- Illustration from The Natural History of Useful Aquatic Animals

Scientific classification
- Kingdom: Animalia
- Phylum: Chordata
- Class: Actinopterygii
- Order: Salmoniformes
- Family: Salmonidae
- Genus: Coregonus
- Species: C. laurettae

Binomial name
- Coregonus laurettae T. H. Bean, 1881

Synonyms
- Argyrosomus alascanus Scofield, 1898

= Bering cisco =

Species of fish

The Bering cisco or Lauretta whitefish (Coregonus laurettae) is a freshwater whitefish found in Alaska and part of Russia. It is often considered to be the same species as the more common Arctic cisco (Coregonus autumnalis).

== Description ==
The Bering cisco has an elongate, compressed body. It is silvery-coloured, with a brownish or greenish back. Its pelvic and pectoral fins are almost clear, and its other fins are spotted white. It is distinguished from the Arctic cisco by its smaller number of gill rakers. It reaches a maximum length of 48 centimetres (19 in).

== Distribution ==
The Bering cisco is found in Alaska from Cook Inlet on the south coast to Oliktok Point on the Arctic coast. It occurs on the Yukon River as far upstream as Dawson City, on the Porcupine River, and in the lakes of the Brooks Range. There are some reports of Bering ciscoes from the Chukchi Peninsula and the Kamchatka Peninsula, these presumably being migrants from Alaska.

== Ecology ==
The Bering cisco is usually found in river mouths, brackish lagoons, and coastal waters, but may penetrate far upstream. Most populations are anadromous, migrating as far as 2,100 kilometres (1,300 mi) inland to spawn during the late summer. In most of its range, the Bering cisco is abundant. Its habitats are mostly remote and pristine, and it has no known threats. In rivers, it may be the most abundant migratory fish. In estuaries, the Bering cisco is an important "keystone species", serving as an important source of food for larger animals. The Bering cisco is taken commercially, and sold as "white trout". In New York, smoked Bering ciscoes are popular, and are esteemed for their creamy flesh. They are sold instead of the usual holiday food of Great Lakes whitefishes. Subsistence fishermen also take the Bering cisco in small numbers, as do commercial fishermen fishing for salmon during its migration.

The Bering cisco feeds on amphipods and other invertebrates and small fish such as sculpins. It migrates to clear and shallow streams in the late summer, not feeding during migration. Not eating during migration is typical among salmon, but rare in whitefishes. Spawning occurs in clear, cool streams with 1 to 3 inch gravel. A year after hatching, young ciscoes drift downstream to estuaries. The Bering cisco becomes sexually mature when it is four to nine years old.
