= Lake Stechlin =

Lake in Landkreis Oberhavel, Brandenburg, Germany

Lake Stechlin Großer Stechlinsee
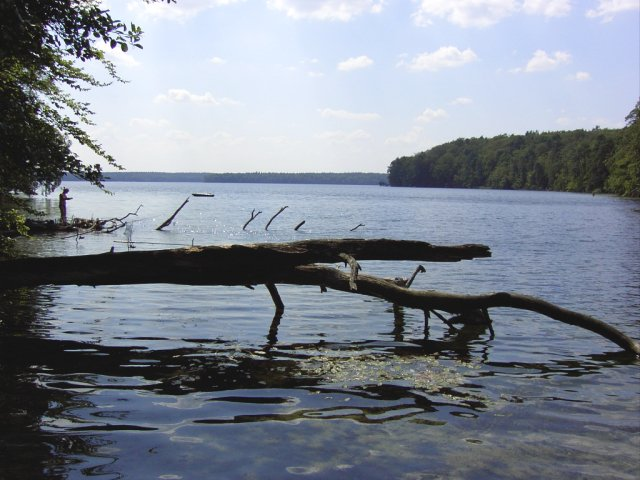

- Location within Brandenburg
- Location: Landkreis Oberhavel, Brandenburg
- Coordinates: 53°9′5.59″N 13°1′34.22″E
- Primary outflows: Polzowkanal
- Basin countries: Germany
- Surface area: 4.52 km^{2} (1.75 sq mi)
- Max. depth: 69.5 m (228 ft)
- Surface elevation: 60.0 m (196.9 ft)

Lake Stechlin or Großer Stechlinsee is a lake in Landkreis Oberhavel, Brandenburg, Germany. At an elevation of 60 m, its surface area is 4.52 km^{2}. The Stechlin cisco, a dwarfed fish, is found only in this lake. Theodor Fontane's last novel, Der Stechlin, was set in its vicinity.

Stechlinsee has a maximum depth of 69.5 metres, making it the deepest lake in the State of Brandenburg. It is also one of the clearest with a visual depth of up to 11 metres (average 6 metres). The water is of drinking quality. It is home to the Leibniz Institute of Freshwater Ecology and Inland Fisheries.

The Stechlin district is still one of the most important oligotrophic landscapes of Central Europe and a LIFE project was undertaken for the restoration of clear water lakes, mires and swamp forests of the Lake Stechlin.

On 22 March 2012 The Global Nature Fund announced Lake Stechlin as the "Living Lake of the Year 2012".
