= Egg Lake (Whatcom County, Washington) =

Lake in Whatcom County, Washington, United States

- Location within Washington (state) Location within the United States
- Location: North Cascades National Park, Whatcom County, Washington, United States
- Coordinates: 48°53′57″N 121°29′04″W
- Type: Tarn
- Basin countries: United States
- Max. length: 100 yd (91 m)
- Max. width: 50 yd (46 m)
- Surface elevation: 5,184 ft (1,580 m)

Egg Lake is located in North Cascades National Park, in the U. S. state of Washington. Egg Lake lies along the route followed by the Copper Ridge Trail, which is accessed from a trailhead in Mount Baker National Forest. The hike to the lake is over 8 mi (13 km) one-way and includes an altitude gain of almost 2,000 ft (610 m). Egg Lake is 1.25 mi (2.01 km) southwest of the Copper Mountain Fire Lookout.
