= Coregonus trybomi =

Conservation status
- Critically Endangered (IUCN 3.1)

Scientific classification
- Kingdom: Animalia
- Phylum: Chordata
- Class: Actinopterygii
- Order: Salmoniformes
- Family: Salmonidae
- Genus: Coregonus
- Species: C. trybomi

Binomial name
- Coregonus trybomi Svärdson, 1979

Species of fish

Coregonus trybomi is a freshwater whitefish in the family Salmonidae. It is a spring-spawning type of cisco, which probably has evolved from sympatric vendace (Coregonus albula) independently in a number of Swedish lakes. Only one of those populations survives, and it is therefore considered Critically Endangered by the IUCN Red List. The status of Coregonus trybomi as a distinct species is however questionable. By Swedish authorities it is treated as a morphotype or ecotype, not an independent species. It was listed as "Data Deficient" in 2010 but excluded from the national red list in 2015.
