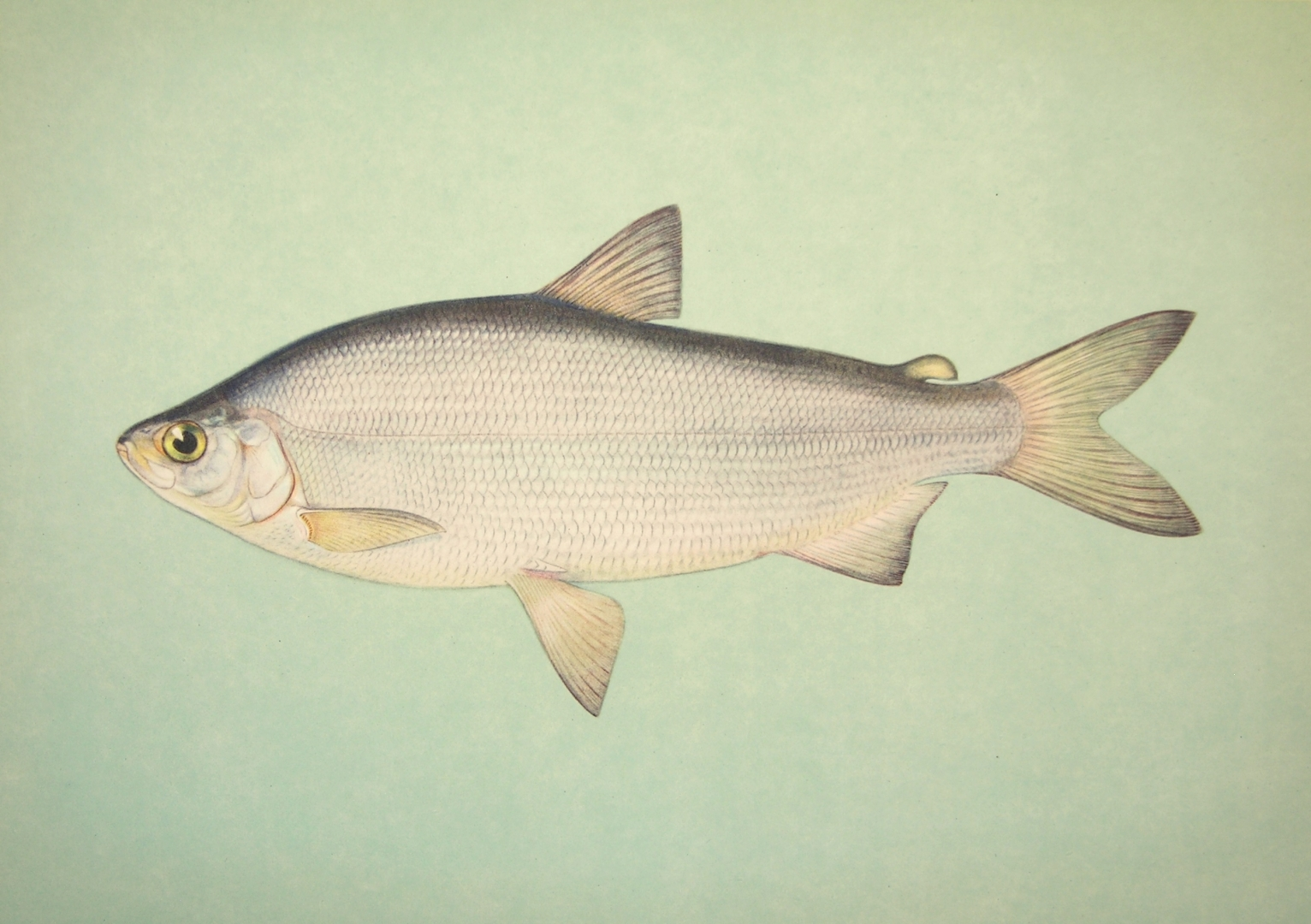

Conservation status
- Least Concern (IUCN 3.1)

Scientific classification
- Kingdom: Animalia
- Phylum: Chordata
- Class: Actinopterygii
- Order: Salmoniformes
- Family: Salmonidae
- Genus: Coregonus
- Species: C. peled

Binomial name
- Coregonus peled (J. F. Gmelin, 1788)

= Peled (fish) =

Species of fish

The peled (Coregonus peled), also called the northern whitefish, is a species of freshwater whitefish in the family Salmonidae. It is found in northern Europe and Asia.

The peled is related to ciscoes of the Coregonus sardinella complex.

== Description ==
Smaller peled much resemble slim vendace or whitefish but as they grow larger they develop a deeper body which becomes less tapered and more blocky. The jaws are of equal length which is in contrast to the whitefish which has a snout longer than its lower jaw, and the vendace which has a projecting lower jaw. Another distinction is that the first gill arch has 50–65 gill rakers, a larger number than either of the other species. This fish grows to a length of about 45 cm (18 in) and a maximum weight of 1.5 kg (3 lb). It has a dark back, silvery flanks and white belly.

== Distribution and habitat ==
The peled is native to lakes and rivers of northern Russia. Its range extends from the Mezen River system emptying into the White Sea eastwards to the Kolyma River basin in eastern Siberia. It is a fish of rivers, reservoirs and lakes and it is possible that more than one species exist under the common name as there is considerable variation in growth rate, spawning date and other factors across its range.

== Biology ==
The peled mostly eats zooplankton, but also consumes bottom-dwelling invertebrates, fish fry, algae and floating insects. Fish mostly become mature when about three years old and can live to about twelve years old. They spawn in autumn and winter over hard sand at the edges of lakes, and over sand, gravel and pebbles in rivers. In northern rivers this may be under ice at depths down to about 3 m (10 ft).

== Uses ==
Although edible, the peled is not highly esteemed for cooking as the flesh is rather soft and tasteless. It is sometimes consumed raw. Peled is highly valued smoked and salted.
