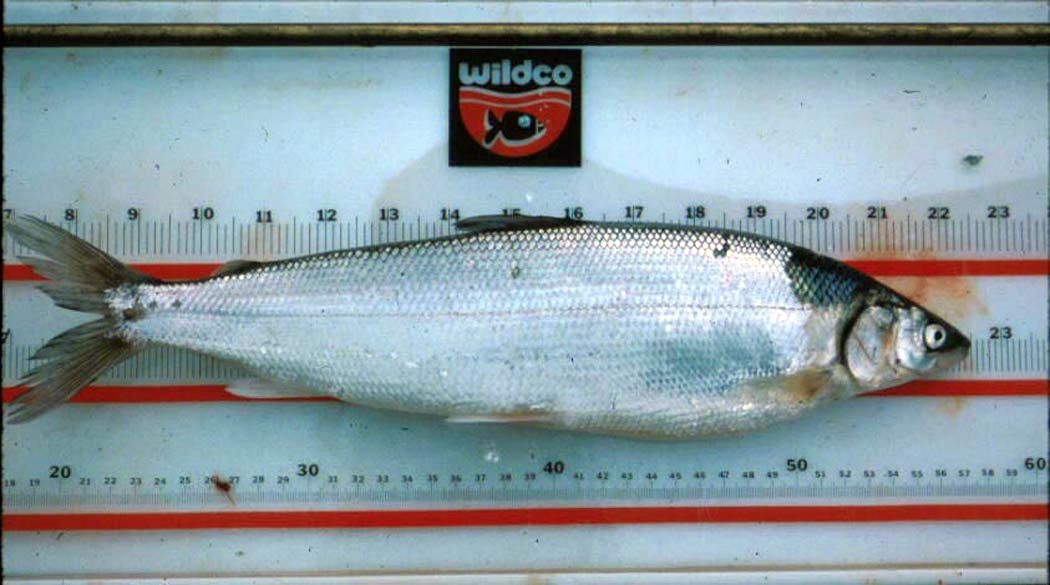

Conservation status
- Least Concern (IUCN 3.1)

Scientific classification
- Kingdom: Animalia
- Phylum: Chordata
- Class: Actinopterygii
- Division: Teleostei
- Order: Salmoniformes
- Family: Salmonidae
- Genus: Coregonus
- Species: C. autumnalis

Binomial name
- Coregonus autumnalis (Pallas, 1776)

= Arctic cisco =

Species of fish

The Arctic cisco (Coregonus autumnalis), also known as Arctic omul (Russian: Омуль), is an anadromous species of freshwater whitefish that inhabits the Arctic parts of Siberia especially Yenisey Gulf. It can also be found in Alaska and Canada. It has a close freshwater relative in several lakes of Ireland, known as the pollan, alternatively regarded as conspecific with it, or as a distinct species.

== Taxonomy ==
The freshwater omul of the Lake Baikal, formerly considered a subspecies Coregonus autumnalis migratorius of the Arctic cisco, has no close genetic relationship to it and is now classified as a separate species, Coregonus migratorius.

== Description ==
The Arctic cisco has a relatively small head with a non-prominent snout. It has a metallic silver body, a brown or dark green back, and nearly colorless fins. It has neither spots nor teeth on its jaw. It does not have a patch of teeth on its tongue. It can reach 50 cm (20 in) in length and weight up to 2 kg (4.4 lbs) but is usually less than 40 cm (16 in) in length and 1 kg (2.2 lbs) in weight.

== Distribution and habitat ==
The Arctic cisco can be found in the Beaufort Sea, Colville River delta, and freshwater drainages east of the Sagavanirktok River. It can be found in several drainages in the Northwest Territories and Siberia, such as the Chaun River, and is not often found east of Point Barrow.

== Food chain ==
=== Diet ===
The Arctic cisco preys upon plankton, crustaceans and small fishes.

=== Predators ===
Predators of the Arctic cisco include marine mammals, seabirds and large fishes such as the Dolly Varden trout and burbot.

== Behaviors ==
=== Reproduction ===
The Arctic cisco is able to spawn at 8 or 9 years of age. Females may only be able to spawn two or three times in their life, and do not necessarily produce eggs every year.

The Arctic cisco reproduces in September. It does not reproduce in Alaskan waters but does reproduce in the Mackenzie River.

Females have up to 90,000 eggs.

=== Migration ===
Young Arctic cisco migrate along the Beaufort Sea coast and are then aided by winds to the Colville River delta, where they are over 160 km (100 mi) from where they spawned. They return to the Mackenzie River to spawn. They do not feed while migrating upwards.

== Life history ==
Arctic cisco can live to be 13 years old or more.

== Conservation ==
Little is known of the abundance of Arctic cisco in Alaska.

=== Threats ===
The largest threats to the Arctic cisco appear to be climate change and oil and gas development.
