= Alburnoides strymonicus =

Conservation status
- Near Threatened (IUCN 3.1)

Scientific classification
- Kingdom: Animalia
- Phylum: Chordata
- Class: Actinopterygii
- Order: Cypriniformes
- Family: Leuciscidae
- Genus: Alburnoides
- Species: A. strymonicus

Binomial name
- Alburnoides strymonicus Chichkoff, 1940

Synonyms
- Alburnoides bipunctatus strymonicus Chichkoff, 1940

Species of fish

Alburnoides strymonicus, the Struma spirlin, is a species of freshwater ray-finned fish belonging to the family Leuciscidae, which includes the daces, minnows and related fishes. This fish is endemic to the drainage system of the Struma (Strymónas) River in Bulgaria, Greece and North Macedonia.

== Taxonomy ==
Alburnoides strymonicus was first formally described in 1940 by the Bulgarian biologist Georgi Chichkoff with its type locality given as the Toplitza River and Struma River in Bulgaria. Previously all of the spirlins found in Greece were considered to be of the subspecies Alburnoides bipunctatus thessalicus but this was reclassified as the species A. thessalicus. A. thessalicus is now considered to be found only in the Pineios, Haliacmon and Vardar rivers with A. strymonicus being described from the Strymónas. However, some authors continued to regard this taxon as a valid subspecies of the schneider. It is now regarded as a valid species which is classified in the genus Alburnoides within the subfamily Leuciscinae of the family Leuciscidae.

== Etymology ==
Alburnoides strymonicus belongs to the genus Alburnoides, this name suffixes -oides on to the genus name Alburnus, which is Latin for whitefish but also refers to the bleak, a name which means pale in English, in reference to the pale non lustrous colour of Alburnus alburnus. The suffix -oides is used to indicate that this taxon is similar to Alburnus, with the type species of the Alburnoides being Alburnus maculatus. The specific name, means "belonging to the Strymon", the ancient name for the River Struma, the type locality.

== Identification ==
Alburoides strymonicus is a small fish with a maximum standard length of 8.3 cm (3.3 in). A combination of morphological and skeletal features distinguish this species from other spirlins.

== Distribution and habitat ==
Alburnoides strymonicus is found in the Struma and Nestos river systems in Bulgaria, Greece and North Macedonia, as well as the Marmaras Stream drainage in Greece.This fish lives streams and in the middle stretches of rivers with modreate to fast currents, it can also be found in reservoirs.
