= Alburnoides economoui =

Conservation status
- Endangered (IUCN 3.1)

Scientific classification
- Kingdom: Animalia
- Phylum: Chordata
- Class: Actinopterygii
- Order: Cypriniformes
- Family: Leuciscidae
- Genus: Alburnoides
- Species: A. economoui

Binomial name
- Alburnoides economoui Barbieri, Vukić, Šanda & Zogaris, 2017

Species of fish

Alburnoides economoui, the Spercheios spirlin, is a species of freshwater ray-finned fish belonging to the family Leuciscidae, the daces and minnows. This species is endemic to Greece where it is found only in the drainage system of the Spercheios river.

== Taxonomy ==
Alburnoides economoui was first formally described in 2017 by Roberta Barbieri, Jasna Vukićć, Radek Šanda and Stamatis Zogaris with its type locality given as the Spercheios River, Loutra Ypatis, Greece at 38°54'14"N, 22°17'30"E. Previously all of the spirlins in Greece were considered to be of the subspecies Alburnoides bipunctatus thessalicus but this was reclassified as the species A. thessalicus. A. thessalicus is now considered to be found only in the Pineios, Haliacmon and Vardar rivers with A. economoui being described from the Spercheios. This species is classified in the genus Alburnoides within the subfamily Leuciscinae of the family Leuciscidae.

== Etymology ==
Alburnoides economoui belongs to the genus Alburnoides, this name suffixes -oides on to the genus name Alburnus, which is Latin for whitefish but also refers to the bleak, a name which means pale in English, in reference to the pale non lustrous colour of Alburnus alburnus. The suffix -oides is used to indicate that this taxon is similar to Alburnus, with the type species of the Alburnoides being Alburnus maculatus. The specific name honours Alcibiades N. Economou, the Research Director at the Institute of Inland Waters of the Hellenic Center for Marine Research, in recognition of his "significant" contributions to the biogeography and ecology of the Greek fish fauna.

== Description ==
Alburnoides economoui can be distinguished from all the other Greek Alburnoides species by the presence of very few or the complete absence of scales on the ventral keel. It also differs in possessing a combination of a conical, slightly pointed snout which is shorter than the diameter of the eye; a terminal mouth with the highest point of the mouthbelow the centre of the eye, a slanted and curved rear portion of the mouth; a relatively deep caudal peduncle; the dorsal fin has 10 to 12 rays in total with 8 1/2 being branched, while the anal fin contains between 15 and 17 soft rays with 13 1/2 being branched. In life the colour is silvery, darker on the upper body and anal fins, these may be reddish in females. The maximum standard length of this species is 8.7 cm (3.4 in).

== Distribution and habitat ==
Alburnoides economoui is endemic to the Spercheios River system in the Phthiotis regional unit of Central Greece. The Spercheios spirlin prefers perennial streams and river stretches where there is fast-flowing, well-oxygenated waters, normally with stony substrates. It can also. however, be found in sluggish canals and spring-fed ditches in the lower floodplain of the river.
