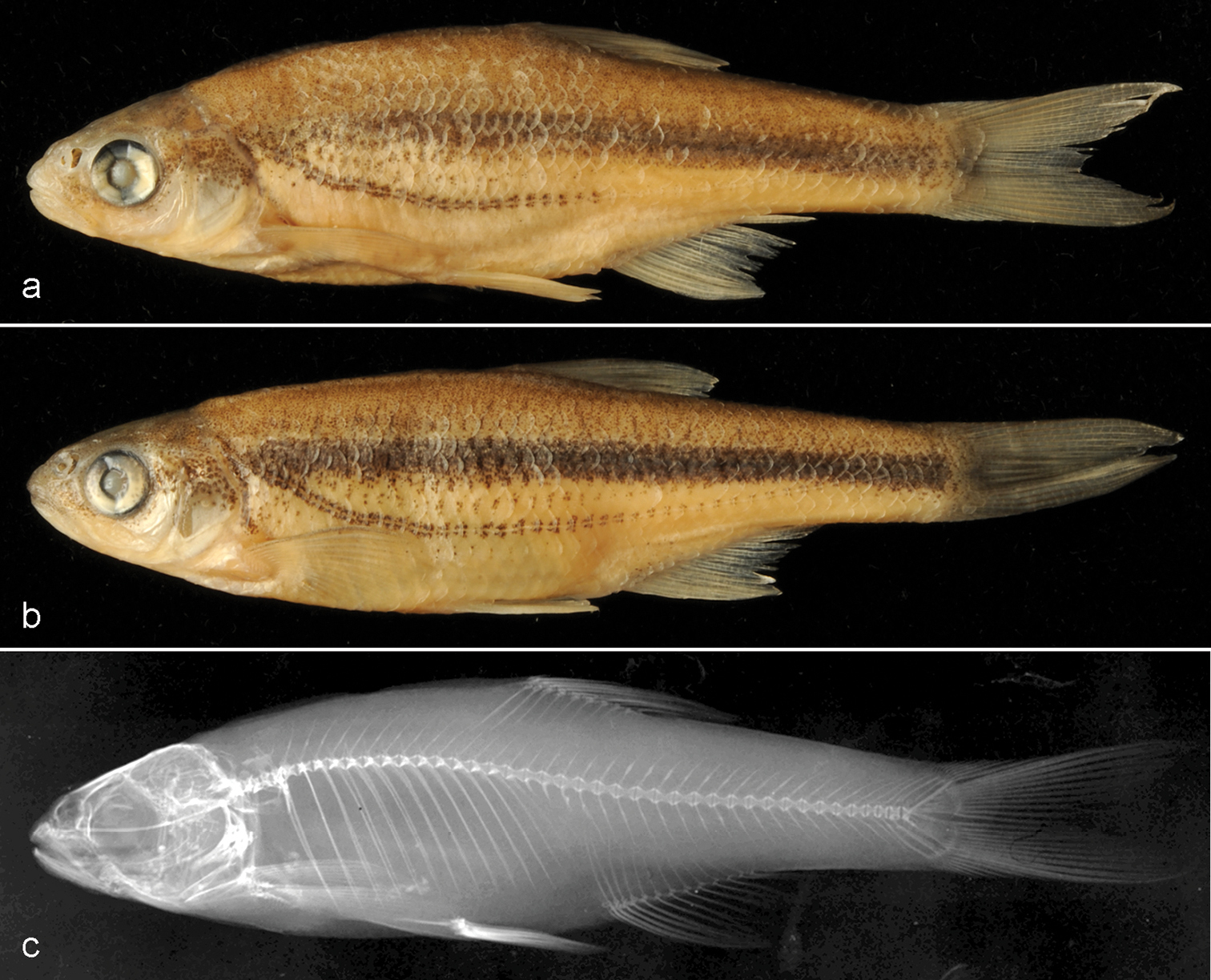

Conservation status
- Endangered (IUCN 3.1)

Scientific classification
- Kingdom: Animalia
- Phylum: Chordata
- Class: Actinopterygii
- Order: Cypriniformes
- Family: Leuciscidae
- Subfamily: Leuciscinae
- Genus: Alburnoides
- Species: A. devolli

Binomial name
- Alburnoides devolli Bogutskaya, Zupančič & Naseka, 2010

= Alburnoides devolli =

Species of fish

Alburnoides devolli, the Devoll riffle minnow or Devoll spirlin, is a species of freshwater ray-finned fish belonging to the family Leuciscidae, which includes the daces, minnows and related fishes This fish is found in southeastern Europe.

== Taxonomy ==
Alburnoides devolli was first formally described in 2010 by Nina Gidalevna Bogutskaya, Primož Zupančič and Alexander Mikhailovich Naseka with its type locality given as the Devoll River by road SH3 near Maliq, Korçë District, Albania at around 40°42'N, 20°42'E. This species is closely related to the schneider (Alburnoides bipunctatus) and all of the populations of schneider in the Balkans south of the Danube were considered to belong to the subspecies A. bipunctatus ohridanus. Later many of these were recognised as valid species based on morphological and molecular data and when Bogutskaya, Zupančič and Naseka studied specimens of A. bipinctatus sensu lato from the southern drainage of the Seman River they found two new valid species, A. devilli and A. fangfangae. These species were distinguished by various morphological differences such as anal and dorsal fins, from other Alburnoides species that occur in Lake Prespa, Lake Skadar or the Danube River. The genus Alburnoides is classified in the subfamily Leuciscinae of the family Leuciscidae.

== Etymology ==
Alburnoides devolli belongs to the genus Alburnoides, this name suffixes -oides on to the genus name Alburnus, which is Latin for whitefish but also refers to the bleak, a name which means pale in English, in reference to the pale non lustrous colour of Alburnus alburnus. The suffix -oides is used to indicate that this taxon is similar to Alburnus, with the type species of the Alburnoides being Alburnus maculatus. The specific name refers to the type locality, the Devoll River in Albania.

== Description ==
Alburnoides devolli has 12 soft rays in the dorsal fin and between 15 and 17 in its anal fin. A feature which identifies the Devoll riffle minnow from its congeners is that of the soft rays in the anal fin 11 1/2 to 13 1/2 of them are branched. It can also be distinguished by the possession of between 44 and 48 pored scales on the lateral line, the shallow caudal peduncle, the scaled ventral keel and the straight upturned mouth, as well as some skeletal features. This species has a maximum standard length of 9.5 cm (3.7 in).

== Distribution and habitat ==
Alburnoides devolli is endemic to the upper reaches of the Devoll River, which is a tributary of the Seman River system in eastern Albania. It is found in shallow streams, between 1 and 5 m (3 ft 3 in and 16 ft 5 in) deep where there is a moderately fast current. There are dams within its range and it is not known if these have been colonised by this fish.
