= Alburnoides prespensis =

Conservation status
- Endangered (IUCN 3.1)

Scientific classification
- Kingdom: Animalia
- Phylum: Chordata
- Class: Actinopterygii
- Order: Cypriniformes
- Family: Leuciscidae
- Subfamily: Leuciscinae
- Genus: Alburnoides
- Species: A. prespensis

Binomial name
- Alburnoides prespensis (S. Karaman, 1924)

Synonyms
- Alburnus bipunctatus var. prespensis S. Karaman, 1924; Alburnus bipunctatus prespensis S. Karaman, 1924

Species of fish

Alburnoides prespensis, the Prespa spirlin, is a species of freshwater ray-finned fish belonging to the family Leuciscidae, which includes the daces, minnows and related fishes. This fish is endemic to the Balkans, around Prespa Lakes.

== Taxonomy ==
Alburnoides prespensis was first formally described as Alburnoides bipunctatus prespensis in 1924 by the Bosnian Serb, then Yugoslav, ichthyologist Stanko Karaman, with its type locality given as Lake Prespa in the Yugoslav Republic of Macedonia. This species is closely related to the schneider (Alburnoides bipunctatus), and all of the populations of schneider in the Balkans south of the Danube were considered to belong to the subspecies A. bipunctatus ohridanus. A. prespensis is now recognised as a valid species within the genus Alburnoides, which is classified in the subfamily Leuciscinae of the family Leuciscidae.

== Etymology ==
Alburnoides prespensis belongs to the genus Alburnoides. This name suffixes -oides onto the genus name Alburnus, which is Latin for "whitefish", but also refers to the bleak, a name which means "pale" in English, in reference to the pale, non-lustrous colour of Alburnus alburnus. The suffix -oides is used to indicate that this taxon is similar to Alburnus, with the type species of the Alburnoides being Alburnus maculatus. The specific name refers to the type locality, Lake Prespa in Greece, Albania and North Macedonia.

== Description ==
Alburnoides prespensis is distinguished from other spirlins by having a terminal mouth with the cleft of the mouth only slightly slanted, an anal fin with between 10 and 11 1/2 branched rays. The lateral line has 40-43 scales, the caudal peduncle is between 1.8-2.2 times longer than it is deep, the snout is longer than diameter of the eye, and the distance between the eyes is 1.2-1.4 times the diameter of the eye. This species has a maximum total length of 13.1 cm (5.2 in).

== Distribution and habitat ==
Alburnoides prespensis is endemic to the drainage basin of the Prespa lakes which straddles the borders of Albania, Greece and North Macedonia. Within the basin the Prespa spirlin is found in the littoral zone of the lake, and in the streams and rivers flowing into the lake, where it prefers clear, flowing, well-oxygentaed water.
