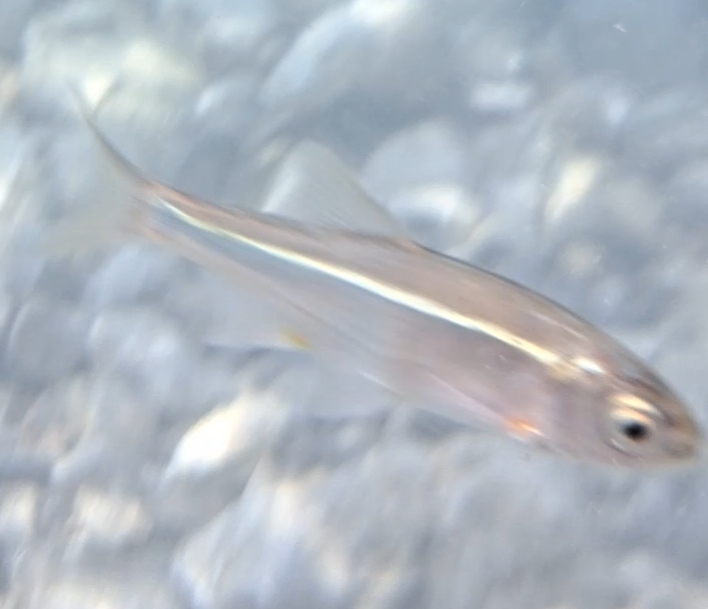

Conservation status
- Near Threatened (IUCN 3.1)

Scientific classification
- Kingdom: Animalia
- Phylum: Chordata
- Class: Actinopterygii
- Order: Cypriniformes
- Family: Leuciscidae
- Genus: Alburnoides
- Species: A. ohridanus

Binomial name
- Alburnoides ohridanus (Karaman, 1928)

Synonyms
- Alburnoides bipunctatus ohridanus Karaman, 1928

= Alburnoides ohridanus =

Species of fish

The Ohrid spirlin (Alburnoides ohridanus) is a fish species of family Leuciscidae. This species is endemic to Lake Ohrid and adjacent rivers and lakes in the Balkans. It is a benthopelagic temperate freshwater fish, up to 9 cm in length. It was originally named as a subspecies of Alburnoides bipunctatus. It is threatened by non-indigenous species of fish, many of which have been introduced into Lake Ohrid.

== Taxonomy ==
Alburnoides ohridanus was first formally described as Alburnus bipunctatus ohridanus in 1928 by the Bosnian Serb, then Yugoslav, ichthyologist Stanko Karaman with its type locality given as Lake Ohrid in Yugoslavia. This species is closely related to the schneider (Alburnoides bipunctatus) and all of the populations of schneider in the Balkans south of the Danube were considered to belong to the subspecies A. bipunctatus ohridanus. A. ohridanus is now recognised as a valid species within the genus Alburnoides, which is classified in the subfamily Leuciscinae of the family Leuciscidae.

== Etymology ==
Alburnoides ohridanus belongs to the genus Alburnoides, this name suffixes -oides on to the genus name Alburnus, which is Latin for whitefish but also refers to the bleak, a name which means pale in English, in reference to the pale non lustrous colour of Alburnus alburnus. The suffix -oides is used to indicate that this taxon is similar to Alburnus, with the type species of the Alburnoides being Alburnus maculatus. The specific name refers to the type locality, Lake Ohrid in Albania and North Macedonia.

== Identification and biology ==
Alburnoides ohridanus grows to 9 cm in standard length and can be distinguished from other Balkan species of Alburnoides by having a distinctly upturned mouth, the eye diameter being equal to the length of the snout, a distinct indentation on the nape, a long caudal peduncle which is just under twice as long as it is deep, 42-44 scales on the lateral line and in having 11 1/2 branched rays in its anal fin. It occurs in the surf zone along the lake shore. It spawns in late spring, in May and June.

== Distribution and habitat ==
Alburnoides ohridanus is endemic to the central Balkans in Albania, Montenegro, North Macedonia and Kosovo. It occurs in the Drin as well as lakes Ohrid and Skadar and in the drainages of the Mati, Erzeni and Ishëm rivers in northern Albania. The lake populations of this species are most frequently observed in littoral zones to depths of around 7.5 m (25 ft), this zone may extend a few hundred metres offshore in Lake Ohrid and makes up a large proportion of Lake Skadar. Ohrid spirlins are commonly seen in areas where macrophytes are common, and they prefer to spawn over stony areas in late spring and early summer. The Ohrid spirlins living in rivers have not been well studied, but probably prefer stretches of slower-moving water with clean, well-oxygenated water where there are rocky or stony substrates.

== Conservation status ==
Alburnoides ohridanus is classified as Vulnerable by the International Union for Conservation of Nature because it has a relatively restricted range and is subject to threats from habitat loss, pollution, water abstraction and introduced non native fish species.
