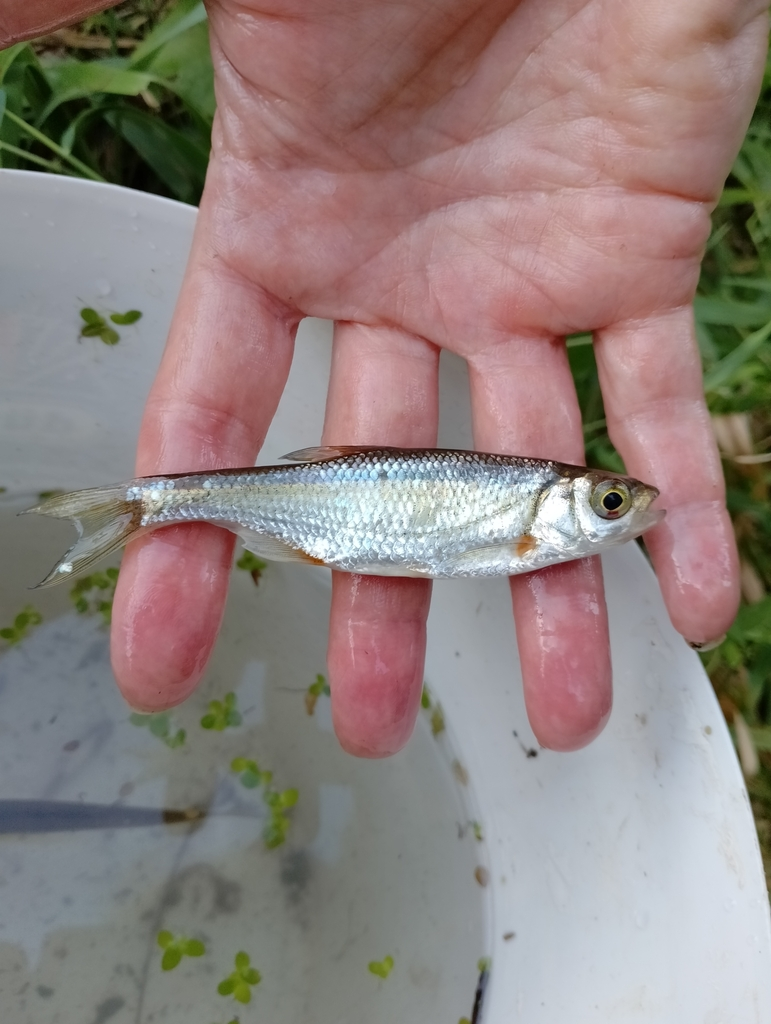

Conservation status
- Least Concern (IUCN 3.1)

Scientific classification
- Kingdom: Animalia
- Phylum: Chordata
- Class: Actinopterygii
- Order: Cypriniformes
- Family: Leuciscidae
- Subfamily: Leuciscinae
- Genus: Alburnoides
- Species: A. rossicus

Binomial name
- Alburnoides rossicus L. S. Berg, 1924

Synonyms
- Alburnoides bipunctatus rossicus Berg, 1924

= Alburnoides rossicus =

Species of fish

Alburnoides rossicus the Russian spirlin, is a species of freshwater ray-finned fish belonging to the family Leuciscidae, which includes the daces, minnows and related fishes. This fish is found in Eastern Europe.

== Taxonomy ==
Alburnoides rossicus was first formally described as Alburnoides bipunctatus rossicus in 1924 by the Russian geographer and biologist Lev Semyonovich Berg with its type locality given as the Dnieper and Volga rivers in Russia. This taxon has been regarded as a subspecies of the schneider (A. bipunctatus) but is now accepted as a separate valid species. The genus Alburnoides is classified in the subfamily Leuciscinae of the family Leuciscidae.

== Etymology ==
Alburnoides rossicus belongs to the genus Alburnoides, this name suffixes -oides on to the genus name Alburnus, which is Latin for whitefish but also refers to the bleak, a name which means pale in English, in reference to the pale non lustrous colour of Alburnus alburnus. The suffix -oides is used to indicate that this taxon is similar to Alburnus, with the type species of the Alburnoides being Alburnus maculatus. The specific name, rossicus, means "belonging to Russia", the type locality.

== Identification ==
Alburnoides rossicus is similar to the schneider A. bipunctatus but a morphological analysis showed that features such as the pharyngeal teeth, meristics and other morphological characters in combination clustered together and separately from the Danubian specimens of the schneider.

== Distribution and habitat ==
Alburnoides rossicus has a wide distribution in the Baltic States and Eastern Europe, it is found in the Dniester, Southern Bug and Dnieper rivers draining into the Black Sea basin, the Don River drainage in the Sea of Azov basin and the Volga River drainage in the Caspian Sea basin. It is also found in all of the rivers flowing to the southeastern Baltic Sea from the Pasłęka River in Poland to the Pärnu River in Estonia. Its habitat is streams and rivers where there is swift to moderately fast running water, in shallow areas over gravel, pebble or rocks.
