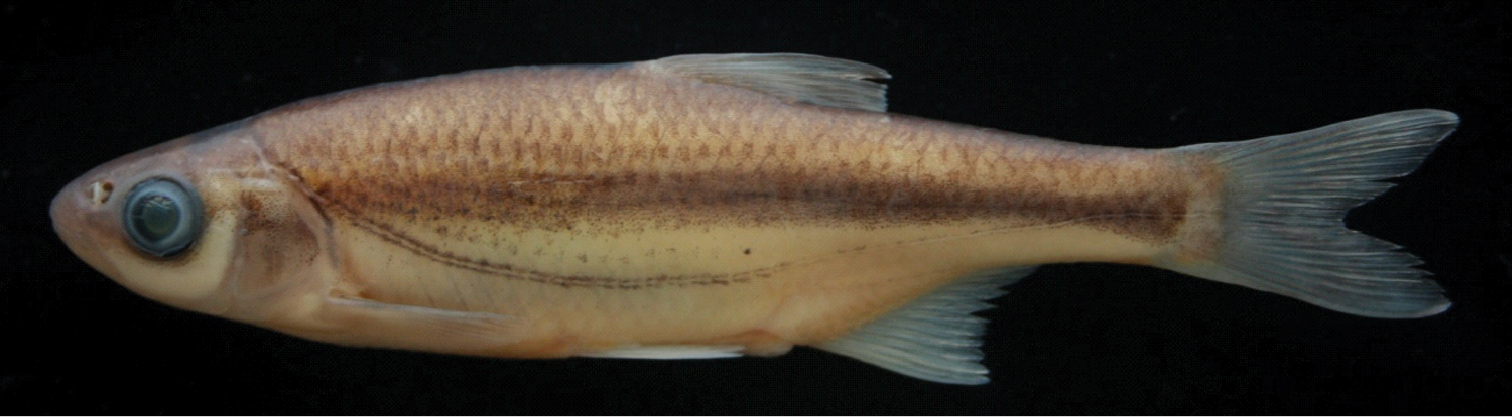

Conservation status
- Near Threatened (IUCN 3.1)

Scientific classification
- Kingdom: Animalia
- Phylum: Chordata
- Class: Actinopterygii
- Order: Cypriniformes
- Family: Leuciscidae
- Genus: Alburnoides
- Species: A. tzanevi

Binomial name
- Alburnoides tzanevi Chichkoff, 1933

Synonyms
- Alburnoides bipunctatus tzanevi Chichkoff, 1933

= Alburnoides tzanevi =

Species of fish

Alburnoides tzanevi, the Thracian spirlin, is a species of freshwater ray-finned fish belonging to the family Leuciscidae, the daces and minnows. This species is found in small rivers flowing into the Black Sea in southern Bulgaria, European Turkey and the far west of Anatolia.

== Taxonomy ==
Alburnoides tzanevi was first formally described as Alburnoides bipunctatus tzanevi in 1940 by the Bulgarian biologist Georgi Chichkoff with its type locality given as the Riesova River where it enters Black Sea at 42°N in Bulgaria. This taxon continued to be regarded as a subspecies of the schneider (Alburnoides bipunctatus until the early 2000s. It is now regarded as a valid species which is classified in the genus Alburnoides within the subfamily Leuciscinae of the family Leuciscidae.

== Etymology ==
Alburnoides tzanevi belongs to the genus Alburnoides, this name suffixes -oides on to the genus name Alburnus, which is Latin for whitefish but also refers to the bleak, a name which means pale in English, in reference to the pale non lustrous colour of Alburnus alburnus. The suffix -oides is used to indicate that this taxon is similar to Alburnus, with the type species of the Alburnoides being Alburnus maculatus. The specific name, tzanevi, honours Panayot Tzanev, who was an assistant at the Zoological Institute of the Russian Academy of Sciences, a collector of a large number ichthyological samples, although apparently not of this species.

== Identification ==
Alburnoides tzanevi is distinguished from other Alburnoides species in the southern Balkans and Turkey by its more slender body, the depth of the body at the dorsal fin origin is roughly equal to the length of the head, while in other species the body is deeper than the length of the head. It also has a much more pointed snoutn compared to the slightly pointed or rounded snouts of its congeners.

== Distribution and habitat ==
Alburnoides tzanevi is found in minor coastal rivers which drain into the southwestern Black Sea basin, from the Veleka and Rezovo rivers in southeastern Bulgaria to the Koca River in northern Turkey. here it occurs in flowing, clear stretches of streams and rivers with riverbeds of sand, gravel, cobbles and pebbles.
