= Alburnoides kubanicus =

Conservation status
- Least Concern (IUCN 3.1)

Scientific classification
- Kingdom: Animalia
- Phylum: Chordata
- Class: Actinopterygii
- Order: Cypriniformes
- Family: Leuciscidae
- Subfamily: Leuciscinae
- Genus: Alburnoides
- Species: A. kubanicus

Binomial name
- Alburnoides kubanicus Bănărescu, 1964

Synonyms
- Alburnoides bipunctatus ssp. kubanicus

Species of fish

Alburnoides kubanicus, the Kuban spirlin or Kuban riffle minnow, is a species of freshwater fish in the family Leuciscidae. It is endemic to the Kuban drainage in Russia.

== Taxonomy ==
Alburnoides kubanicus was first formally described in 1964 by the Romanian ichthyologist Petre Mihai Bănărescu with the drainage of the Kuban River in Russia given as the type locality. This taxon has been regarded as a subspecies of the schneider (A. bipunctatus) but is now accepted as a separate valid species. The genus Alburnoides is classified in the subfamily Leuciscinae of the family Leuciscidae.

== Etymology ==
Alburnoides kubanicus belongs to the genus Alburnoides, this name suffixes -oides on to the genus name Alburnus, which is Latin for whitefish but also refers to the bleak, a name which means pale in English, in reference to the pale non lustrous colour of Alburnus alburnus. The suffix -oides is used to indicate that this taxon is similar to Alburnus, with the type species of the Alburnoides being Alburnus maculatus. The specific name, kubanicus, means "belonging to Kuban", the type locality .

== Identification ==
Alburnoides kubanicus is similar to the schneider A. bipunctatus but a morphological analysis showed that features such as the pharyngeal teeth, meristics and other morphological characters in combination clustered together and separately from the Danubian specimens of the schneider.

== Distribution and habitat ==
Alburnoides kubanicus is found from the upper reaches of tributaries down to the sections at the foot of the Caucasus Mountains of the Kuban River system in southern Russia, including the Laba. It has also been recorded from the Gastogay River, which used to be a tributary of the Kuban River drainage but now flows into the Vityazevskiy Liman of the Black Sea. Its habitat is streams and rivers where there is swift to moderately fast running water, in shallow areas over gravel, pebble or rocks.
