= Alburnoides fangfangae =

Conservation status
- Near Threatened (IUCN 3.1)

Scientific classification
- Kingdom: Animalia
- Phylum: Chordata
- Class: Actinopterygii
- Order: Cypriniformes
- Family: Leuciscidae
- Subfamily: Leuciscinae
- Genus: Alburnoides
- Species: A. fangfangae

Binomial name
- Alburnoides fangfangae Bogutskaya, Zupančič & Naseka, 2010

Species of fish

Alburnoides fangfangae is a species of freshwater ray-finned fish belonging to the family Leuciscidae, the daces and minnows. This fish is endemic to southeastern Albania.

== Taxonomy ==
Alburnoides fangfangae was first formally described in 2010 by Nina Gidalevna Bogutskaya, Primož Zupančič and Alexander Mikhailovich Naseka with its type locality given as the Vodica River at Selenica, a tributary of the Osum River, roughly 40°20'N, 20°41'E, in Albania. This species is closely related to the schneider (Alburnoides bipunctatus) and all of the populations of schneider in the Balkans south of the Danube were considered to belong to the subspecies A. bipunctatus ohridanus. Later many of these were recognised as valid species based on morphological and molecular data and when Bogutskaya, Zupančič and Naseka studied specimens of A. bipinctatus sensu lato from the southern drainage of the Seman River they found two new valid species, A. devilli and A. fangfangae. These species were distinguished by various morphological differences such as anal and dorsal fins, from other Alburnoides species that occur in Lake Prespa, Lake Skadar or the Danube River. The genus Alburnoides is classified in the subfamily Leuciscinae of the family Leuciscidae.

== Etymology ==
Alburnoides fangfangae belongs to the genus Alburnoides, this name suffixes -oides on to the genus name Alburnus, which is Latin for whitefish but also refers to the bleak, a name which means pale in English, in reference to the pale non lustrous colour of Alburnus alburnus. The suffix -oides is used to indicate that this taxon is similar to Alburnus, with the type species of the Alburnoides being Alburnus maculatus. The specific name honours the memory of Chinese-Swedish ichthyologist Fang Fang Kullander.

== Identification ==
Alburoides fangfangae is a small fish with a maximum standard length of 7.3 cm (2.9 in). A combination of morphological and skeletal features distinguish this species from other spirlins.

== Distribution and habitat ==
Alburoides fangfangae has only been recorded from the Osum River, a major tributary of the Seman River in southeastern Albania where it occurs in shallow river stretches less than 2 m (6 ft 7 in) wide with a moderately fast current and stony substrate.
