= Parham's riffle minnow =

Scientific classification
- Kingdom: Animalia
- Phylum: Chordata
- Class: Actinopterygii
- Order: Cypriniformes
- Family: Leuciscidae
- Subfamily: Leuciscinae
- Genus: Alburnoides
- Species: A. parhami

Binomial name
- Alburnoides parhami Mousavi-Sabet, Vatandoust & Doadrio, 2015

Species of fish

Parham's riffle minnow (Alburnoides parhami) is a species of small (10.8 cm max length) freshwater fish in the family Cyprinidae. It is endemic to the Caspian Sea basin river drainages in Iran.
