= Cironka =

Traditional Albanian and Macedonian dish

- Place of origin: Macedonia
- Main ingredients: common bleak

Cironka (Macedonian: Циронка) is a traditional Macedonian fish dish that originated from Prespa region.

This dish is made from common bleak. The fresh fish are salted with a lot of salt until they become whitish. Then, the fish are left in a bowl for six to seven days. The bowl must be covered and in addition to the fish may contain some nettle. After that, the fish are threaded and they're left to dry in sunny weather, until they get hard. Then the fish are fried on both sides, and placed in hot water to become less salty. The fish are served with some peppermint, oil, vinegar and garlic.
