= Velioğlu =

Velioğlu may refer to:

== People ==
- Hüseyin Velioğlu (1952–2000), Kurdish convicted terrorist
- Taha Can Velioğlu (born 1994), Turkish footballer
- Velioğlu (tribe)

== Other uses ==
- Velioglu's chub, fish
