= Coad's riffle minnow =

Scientific classification
- Kingdom: Animalia
- Phylum: Chordata
- Class: Actinopterygii
- Order: Cypriniformes
- Family: Leuciscidae
- Subfamily: Leuciscinae
- Genus: Alburnoides
- Species: A. coadi

Binomial name
- Alburnoides coadi Mousavi-Sabet, Vatandoust & Doadrio, 2015

Species of fish

Coad's riffle minnow (Alburnoides coadi) is a species of small (10.8 cm max length) freshwater fish in the family Cyprinidae. It is endemic to the Namroud and Hableroud River drainage in Iran.
