= Thessalian spirlin =

Conservation status
- Near Threatened (IUCN 3.1)

Scientific classification
- Kingdom: Animalia
- Phylum: Chordata
- Class: Actinopterygii
- Division: Teleostei
- Order: Cypriniformes
- Family: Leuciscidae
- Genus: Alburnoides
- Species: A. thessalicus

Binomial name
- Alburnoides thessalicus Stephanidis, 1950

Synonyms
- Alburnoides bipunctatus thessalicus Stephanidis, 1950

Species of fish

The Thessalian spirlin (Alburnoides thessalicus) is a species of freshwater ray-finned fish belonging to the family Leuciscidae, which includes the daces, minnows and related fishes. This fish is found in the southern Balkans in Greece and North Macedonia.

== Taxonomy ==
The Thessalian spirlin was first formally described in 1950 as Alburnoides bipunctatus thessalicus by Alexander I. Stephanidis with its type locality given as the Malakasiotiko River in the Pinios River drainage in Thessaly, Greece at 39°46'47"N, 21°22'16"E. Previously all of the spirlins in Greece were considered to belong to this subspecies but this has now been reclassified as the species A. thessalicus. A. thessalicus is now considered to be found only in the Pineios, Haliacmon and Vardar rivers with A. economoui being described from the Spercheios, with other taxa elsewhere. This species is classified in the genus Alburnoides within the subfamily Leuciscinae of the family Leuciscidae.

== Etymology ==
The Thessalian spirlin belongs to the genus Alburnoides, this name suffixes -oides on to the genus name Alburnus, which is Latin for whitefish but also refers to the bleak, a name which means pale in English, in reference to the pale non lustrous colour of Alburnus alburnus. The suffix -oides is used to indicate that this taxon is similar to Alburnus, with the type species of the Alburnoides being Alburnus maculatus. The specific name, thessalicus, means "of Thessaly", referring to the type locality.

== Description ==
The Thessalian spirlin has a relatively deep body and a rather thick, short, slightly or obviously rounded snout. The length of the snout is around the same as the diameter of the eye. The mouth is oblique with its highest point beneath the eye. There is a central keel for two thirds of the body length which is scaled. The anal fin contains 12 1/2 branched rays and the caudal fin is clearly forked with moderately pointed lobes. This fish has a maximum standard length of 8.1 cm (3.2 in).

== Distribution and habitat ==
The Thessalian spirlin is endemic to the southern Balkans where it is found in the Vardar River in North Macedonia and Greece and in the Pineiós, Haliacmon, Loudias and Gallikos rivers in Greece. This fish is found in the flowing stretches of streams and rivers where the substrate is made up of cobbles and pebbles. It has also colonised some dammed reservoirs.
