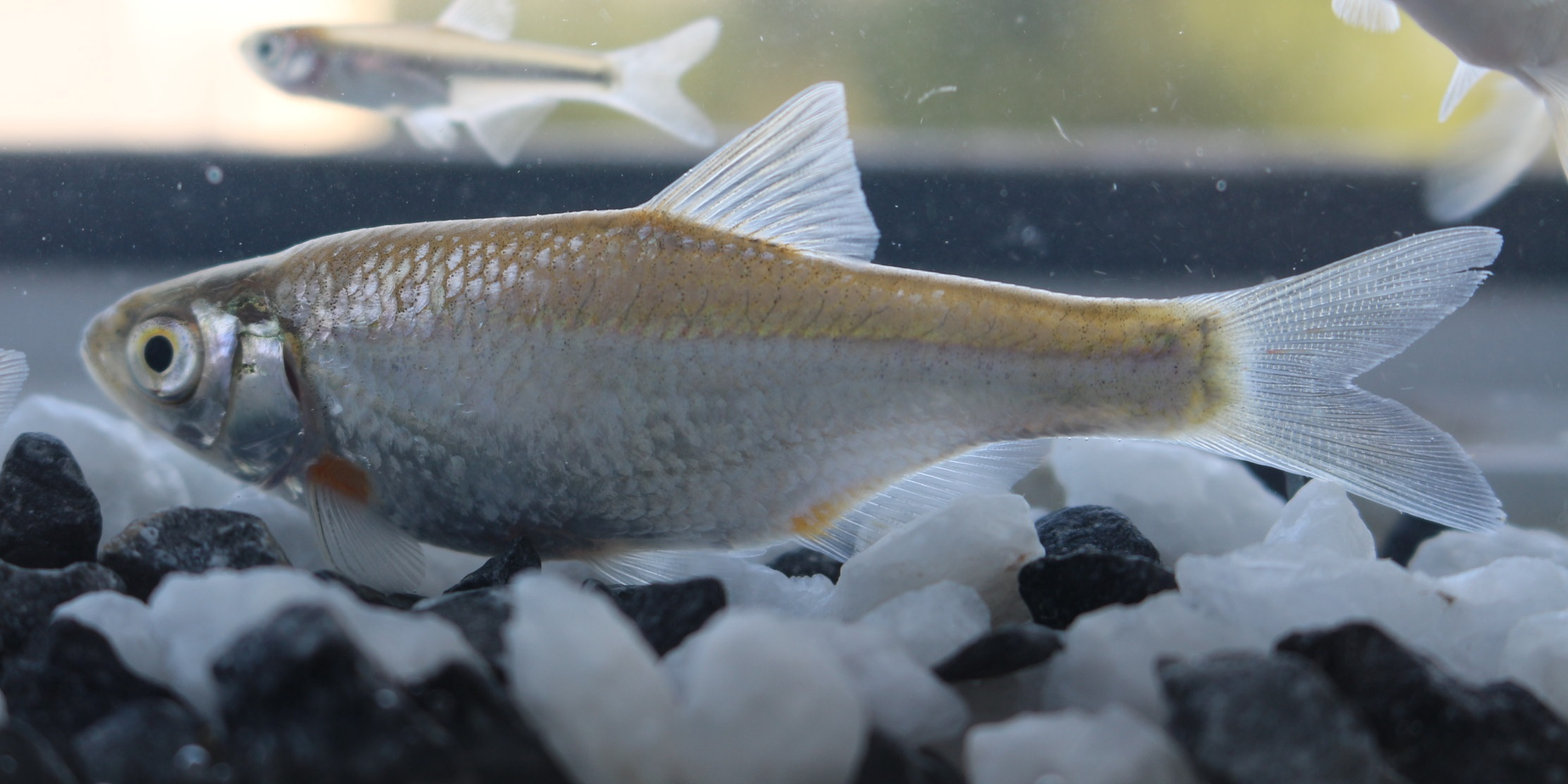

Scientific classification
- Domain: Eukaryota
- Kingdom: Animalia
- Phylum: Chordata
- Class: Actinopterygii
- Order: Cypriniformes
- Family: Leuciscidae
- Subfamily: Leuciscinae
- Genus: Alburnoides
- Species: A. holciki

Binomial name
- Alburnoides holciki Coad & Bogutskaya, 2012

= Alburnoides holciki =

Species of fish

Alburnoides holciki is a species of small (10.2 cm max length) freshwater fish in the family Leuciscidae. It was endemic to the Hari River drainage in northwestern Afghanistan, northeastern Iran, and southern Turkmenistan. Recent studies have shown that this species is also found in the Amu Darya basin in Tajikistan and Uzbekistan.
