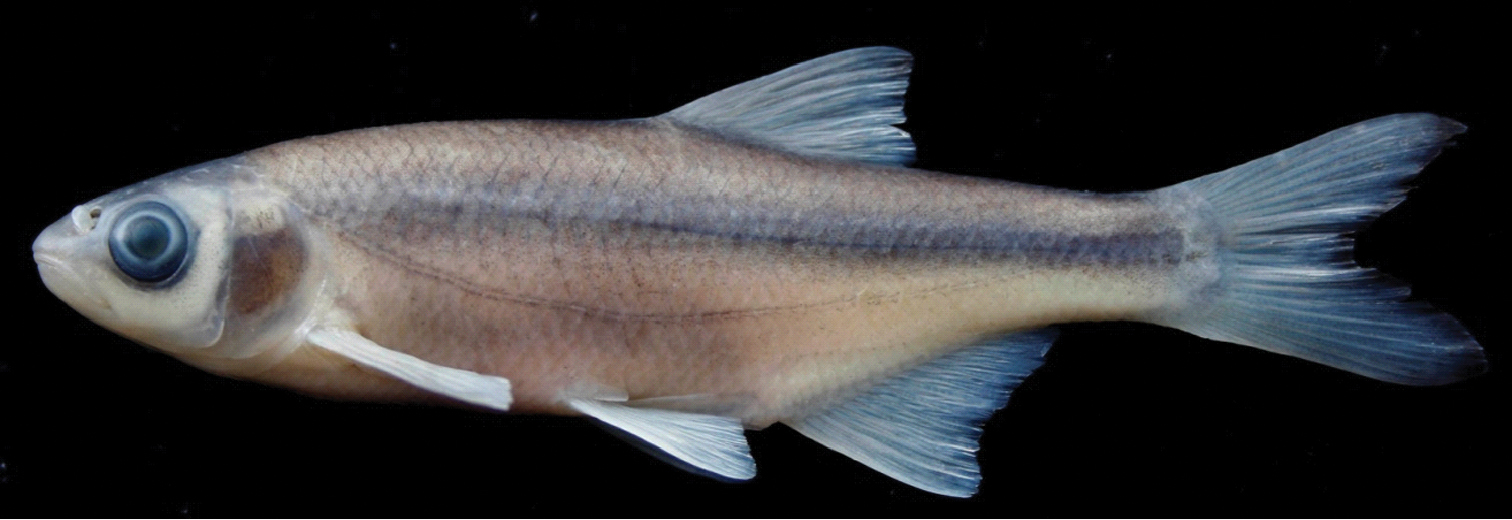

Conservation status
- Least Concern (IUCN 3.1)

Scientific classification
- Kingdom: Animalia
- Phylum: Chordata
- Class: Actinopterygii
- Order: Cypriniformes
- Family: Leuciscidae
- Subfamily: Leuciscinae
- Genus: Alburnoides
- Species: A. fasciatus

Binomial name
- Alburnoides fasciatus (Nordmann, 1840)

Synonyms
- Alburnoides bipunctatus fasciatus Berg, 1949; Aspius fasciatus Nordmann, 1840

= Transcaucasian spirlin =

Species of fish

The Transcaucasian spirlin (Alburnoides fasciatus) is a fish species in the family Leuciscidae. It is widespread in the Western Transcaucasia and rivers of the Black Sea coast in Turkey westward to the Kızılırmak River. It prefers rivers and streams with fast-running shallow water over gravel, pebbles, or rocks.
