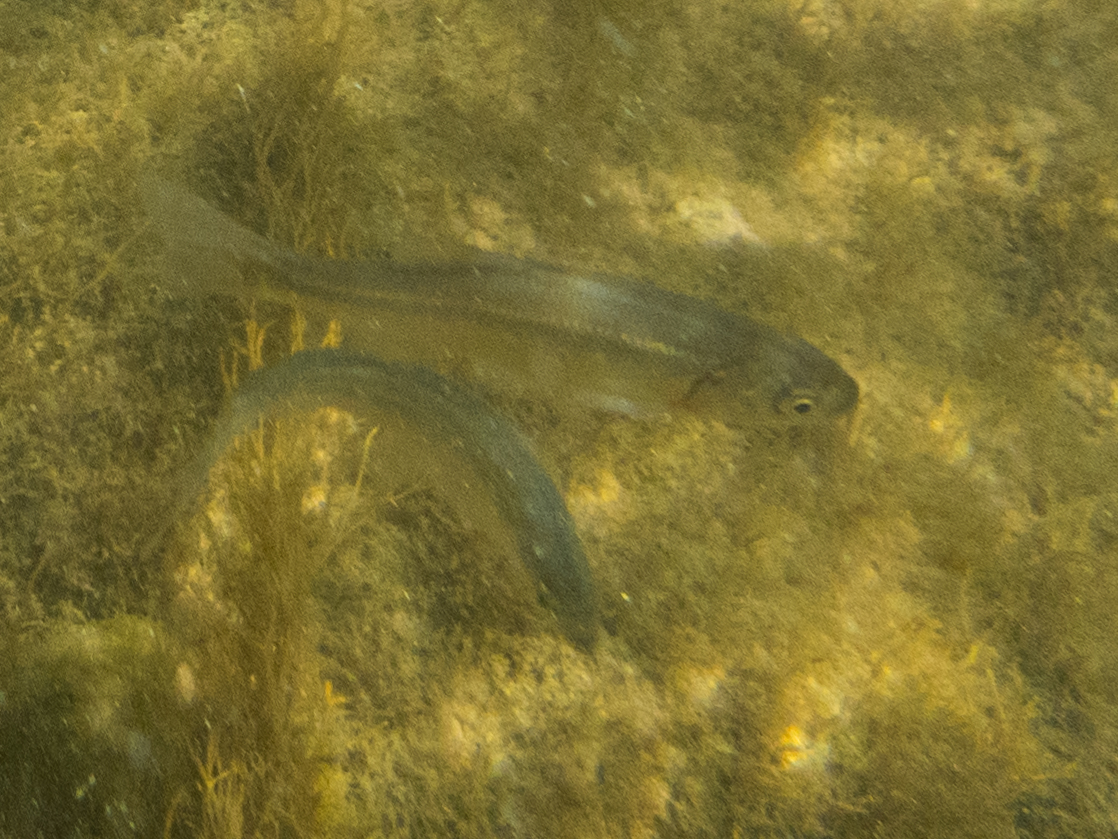

Conservation status
- Least Concern (IUCN 3.1)

Scientific classification
- Kingdom: Animalia
- Phylum: Chordata
- Class: Actinopterygii
- Order: Cypriniformes
- Family: Leuciscidae
- Subfamily: Leuciscinae
- Genus: Alburnoides
- Species: A. gmelini

Binomial name
- Alburnoides gmelini Bogutskaya & Coad, 2009

= Alburnoides gmelini =

Species of fish

Alburnoides gmelini, the Dagestan spirlin, is a fish species of the family Leuciscidae, known from the western Caspian coast of southern Russia. It can be differentiated from its cogenerates by differences in fin ray and vertebral counts, together with other morphological characters. The specific name honours Samuel Gottlieb Gmelin, a Russian-German naturalist who travelled through the River Don area and the Caucasus region and along the western and southern Caspian Sea coasts between 1768 and 1774.
