= Samii's riffle minnow =

Scientific classification
- Kingdom: Animalia
- Phylum: Chordata
- Class: Actinopterygii
- Order: Cypriniformes
- Family: Leuciscidae
- Subfamily: Leuciscinae
- Genus: Alburnoides
- Species: A. samiii

Binomial name
- Alburnoides samiii Mousavi-Sabet, Vatandoust & Doadrio, 2015

Species of fish

Samii's riffle minnow (Alburnoides samiii) is a species of freshwater fish in the family Leuciscidae. It is endemic to the Sefidroud River drainage in Iran.
