= Beyazsu chub =

Scientific classification
- Kingdom: Animalia
- Phylum: Chordata
- Class: Actinopterygii
- Order: Cypriniformes
- Family: Leuciscidae
- Subfamily: Leuciscinae
- Genus: Alburnoides
- Species: A. emineae

Binomial name
- Alburnoides emineae Turan, Kaya, Ekmekçi & Doğan, 2014

Species of fish

The Beyazsu chub (Alburnoides emineae) is a species of small (7.6 cm max length) freshwater fish in the family Leuciscidae. It is endemic to Beyazsu Stream in Turkey.
