= Tabarestan riffle minnow =

Scientific classification
- Kingdom: Animalia
- Phylum: Chordata
- Class: Actinopterygii
- Order: Cypriniformes
- Family: Leuciscidae
- Subfamily: Leuciscinae
- Genus: Alburnoides
- Species: A. tabarestanensis

Binomial name
- Alburnoides tabarestanensis Mousavi-Sabet, Anvarifar & Azizi, 2015

Species of fish

The Tabarestan riffle minnow (Alburnoides tabarestanensis) is a species of freshwater ray-finned fish belonging to the family Leuciscidae, the daces and minnows. It is endemic to the Tajan River drainage in Iran.
