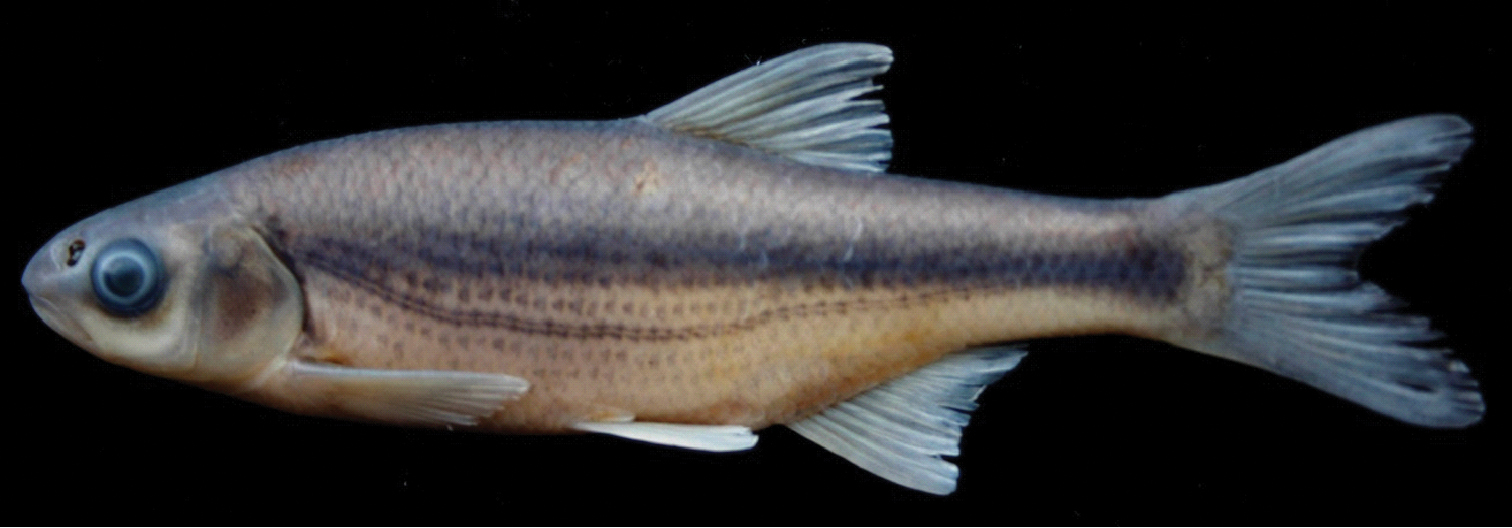

Conservation status
- Least Concern (IUCN 3.1)

Scientific classification
- Kingdom: Animalia
- Phylum: Chordata
- Class: Actinopterygii
- Order: Cypriniformes
- Family: Leuciscidae
- Subfamily: Leuciscinae
- Genus: Alburnoides
- Species: A. eichwaldii

Binomial name
- Alburnoides eichwaldii (De Filippi, 1863)

Synonyms
- Alburnoides bipunctatus armeniensis Dadikyan, 1972; Alburnoides bipunctatus eichwaldi (De Filippi, 1863); Alburnus bipunctatus eichwaldi De Filippi, 1863; Alburnus eichwaldii De Filippi, 1863

= Alburnoides eichwaldii =

Species of fish

Alburnoides eichwaldii, also known as the South Caspian sprilin or Kura chub, is a fish species in the family Leuciscidae. It is widespread in Western Asia in the river drainages of the southwestern Caspian coast from Samur down to rivers of the Lenkoran Province in Azerbaijan. It prefers streams and rivers in the foothills, with well oxygenated, fast-flowing waters, and spawns on gravel in swift currents.
