= Alburnoides idignensis =

Scientific classification
- Domain: Eukaryota
- Kingdom: Animalia
- Phylum: Chordata
- Class: Actinopterygii
- Order: Cypriniformes
- Family: Leuciscidae
- Subfamily: Leuciscinae
- Genus: Alburnoides
- Species: A. idignensis

Binomial name
- Alburnoides idignensis Bogutskaya & Coad, 2009

Species of fish

Alburnoides idignensis, is a fish species of the family Leuciscidae endemic to Iran. It can be differentiated from its cogenerates by differences in fin ray and vertebral counts, together with other morphological characters. The specific name is derived from the Sumerian name for the River Tigris, "Idigna".
