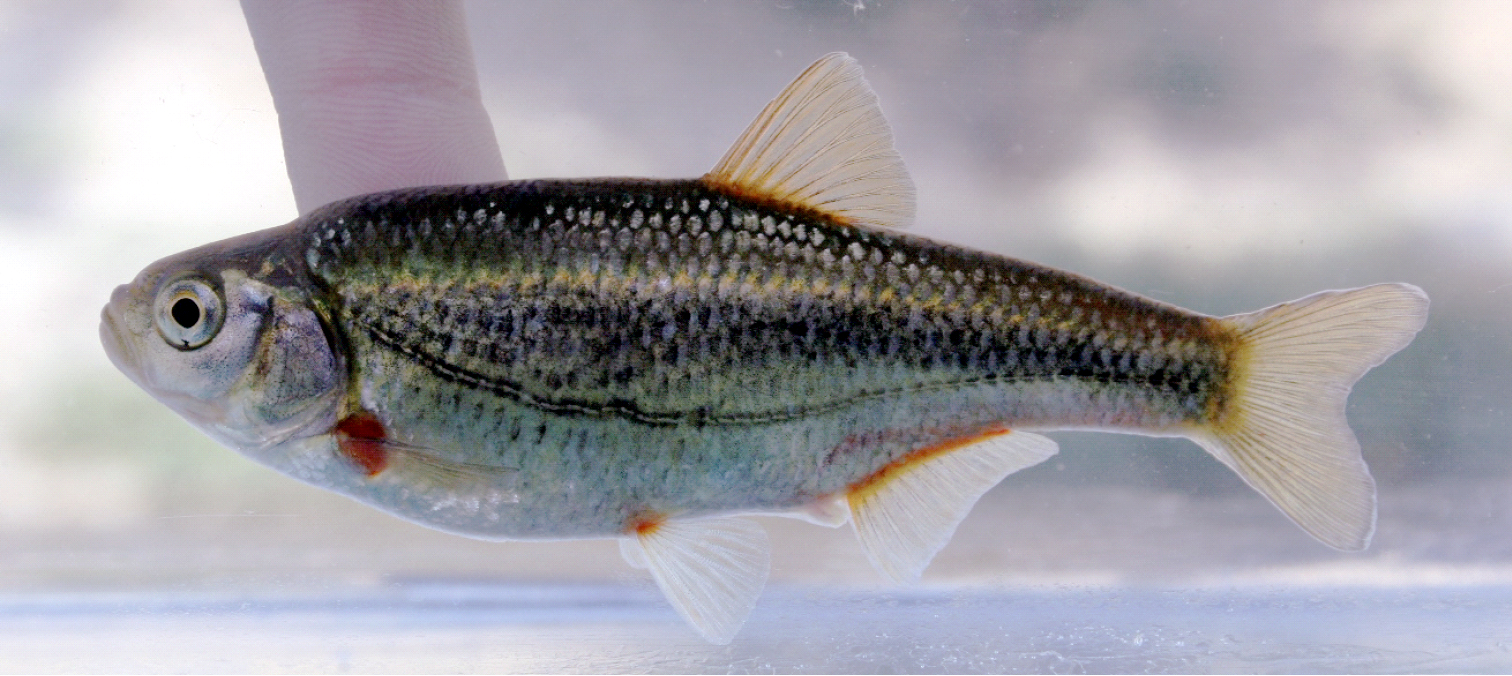

Scientific classification
- Kingdom: Animalia
- Phylum: Chordata
- Class: Actinopterygii
- Order: Cypriniformes
- Family: Leuciscidae
- Genus: Alburnoides
- Species: A. damghani

Binomial name
- Alburnoides damghani Roudbar, Eagderi, Esmaeili, Coad & Bogutskaya, 2016

= Alburnoides damghani =

Species of fish

Alburnoides damghani, commonly known as Damghan riffle minnow, is a species of fish in the family Leuciscidae. The fish is found in the Damghan River.

== Etymology ==
The specific name damghani is named after the city of Damghan.
