= Coregonus confusus =

Conservation status
- Vulnerable (IUCN 3.1)

Scientific classification
- Domain: Eukaryota
- Kingdom: Animalia
- Phylum: Chordata
- Class: Actinopterygii
- Order: Salmoniformes
- Family: Salmonidae
- Genus: Coregonus
- Species: C. confusus

Binomial name
- Coregonus confusus (Fatio, 1885)

Species of fish

Coregonus confusus is a freshwater whitefish from Switzerland. It is also known by its native Swiss German common name, spelled pfärrit, pfarrig, and pfärrig. It was described as Coregonus annectens confusus by Victor Fatio in 1885 from syntypes which have been lost in 1902. The species is rare and only known with certainty from Lake Biel. There is also a possibility that it might occur in Lake Neuchâtel. It vanished from Lake Murten in the 1960s due to eutrophication and water level management.
