= Alburnoides namaki =

Scientific classification
- Domain: Eukaryota
- Kingdom: Animalia
- Phylum: Chordata
- Class: Actinopterygii
- Order: Cypriniformes
- Family: Leuciscidae
- Subfamily: Leuciscinae
- Genus: Alburnoides
- Species: A. namaki

Binomial name
- Alburnoides namaki Bogutskaya & Coad, 2009

Species of fish

Alburnoides namaki, is a fish species of the family Leuciscidae, known from Iran. It can be differentiated from its cogenerates by differences in fin ray and vertebral counts, together with other morphological characters.
