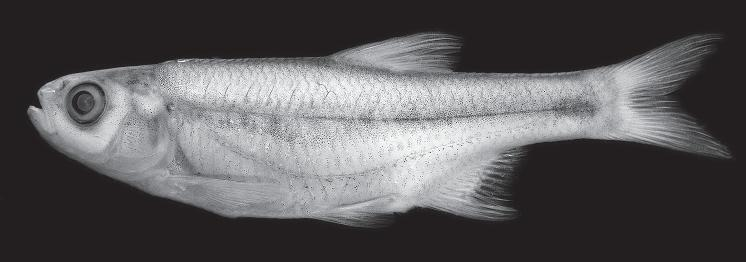
- Original picture of Alburnoides qanati

Scientific classification
- Domain: Eukaryota
- Kingdom: Animalia
- Phylum: Chordata
- Class: Actinopterygii
- Order: Cypriniformes
- Family: Leuciscidae
- Subfamily: Leuciscinae
- Genus: Alburnoides
- Species: A. qanati

Binomial name
- Alburnoides qanati Coad & Bogutskaya, 2009

= Alburnoides qanati =

Species of fish

Alburnoides qanati is a fish species of family Leuciscidae. It is widespread in the Pulvar River system and Kor River in Iran. Benthopelagic subtropical freshwater fish, up to 7.2 cm in length.
