= Alburnoides diclensis =

Scientific classification
- Kingdom: Animalia
- Phylum: Chordata
- Class: Actinopterygii
- Order: Cypriniformes
- Family: Leuciscidae
- Genus: Alburnoides
- Species: A. diclensis

Binomial name
- Alburnoides diclensis Turan, Bektaş, Kaya & Bayçelebi, 2016

Species of fish

Alburnoides diclensis is a species of freshwater ray-finned fish belonging to the family Leuciscidae. This species lives in the Tigris River, Anatolia, Turkey.
