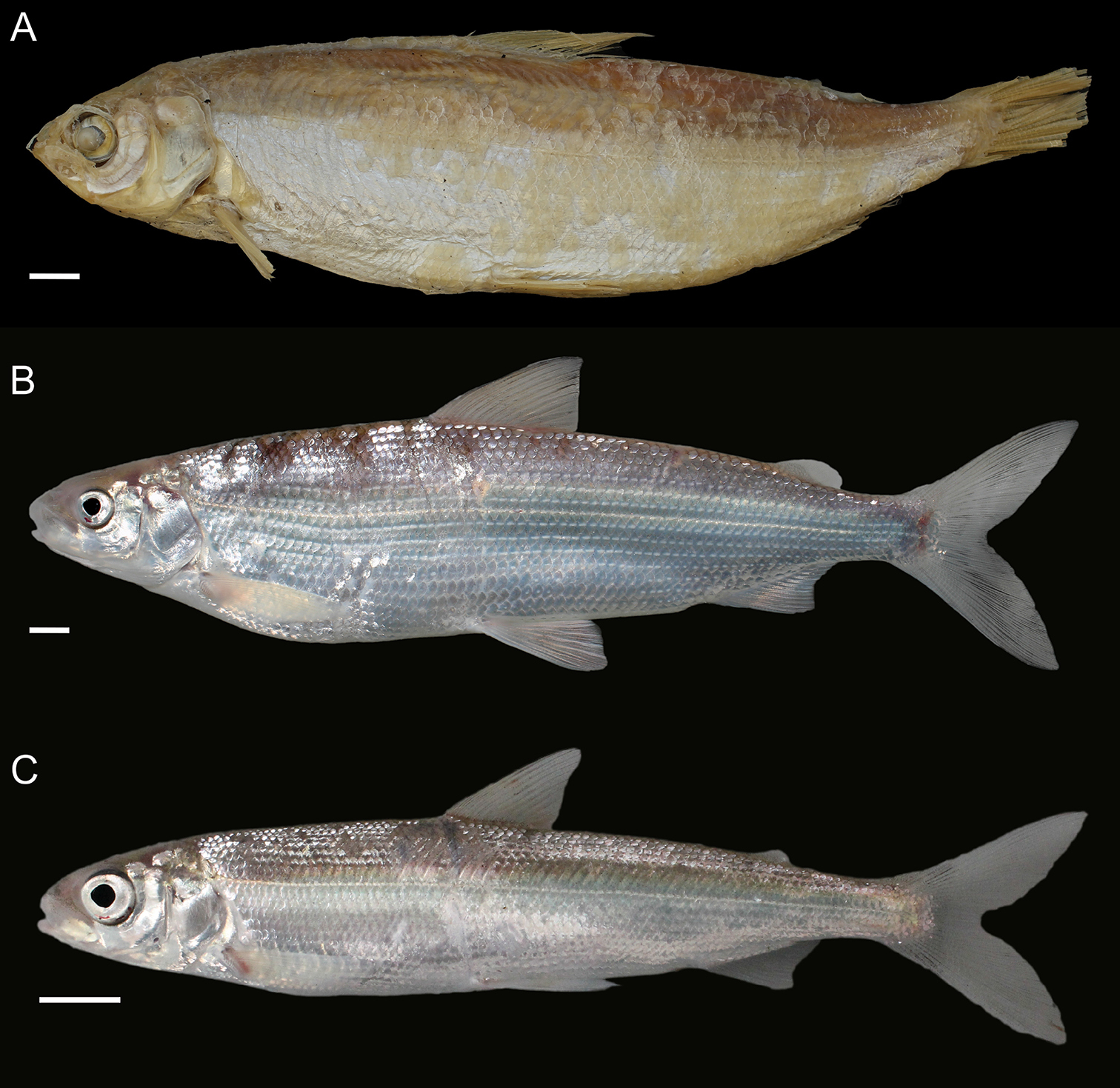
- Coregenus albellus

Conservation status
- Vulnerable (IUCN 3.1)

Scientific classification
- Kingdom: Animalia
- Phylum: Chordata
- Class: Actinopterygii
- Order: Salmoniformes
- Family: Salmonidae
- Genus: Coregonus
- Species: C. albellus

Binomial name
- Coregonus albellus Fatio, 1890

Synonyms
- Coregonus exigmas albellus Fatio, 1890

= Coregonus albellus =

Species of fish

Coregonus albellus, the autumn brienzlig or the Bernese whitefish, is a species of freshwater ray-finned fish belonging to the family Salmonidae, which includes the salmon, trout, whitefish and graylings. This whitefish is endemic to Switzerland.

== Taxonomy ==
Coregonus albellus was first formally described as Coregonus exigmas albellus in 1890 by the Swiss zoologist Victor Fatio with its type locality given as Lake Thun in Switzerland. This species is classified in the whitefish genus Coregonus which is in the subfamily Coregoninae in the family Salmonidae.

== Etymology ==
Coregonus albellus belongs to the genus Coregonus, this name was coined by Peter Artedi in 1738 for C. lavaretus and combines core, derived from kórē which means the pupil in Greek, with gōnía, an "angle" or "corner", an allusion to the front part of the pupil protruding at an acute angle. The specific name, albellus, is a latinisation of the Swiss names albeli or albuli. These are derived from the Latin albus, meaning "white", the root of the name weissfische, i.e. "whitefish".

== Description ==
Coregonus albellus has a maximum published standard length of 26 cm (10 in).

== Distribution and habitat ==
Coregonus albellus is endemic to Switzerland where it is native to two lakes, Lake Brienz and Lake Thun in Berne, although the species has become established in a third lake, Lake Biel, also in Berne, probably migrating along the man-made Aare-Hagneck Canal. The autumn brienzlig is found in deep perialpine oligotrophic lakes which it shares with seven other species of whitefish. This species appears to be found in both benthic and pelagic zones of the lakes it lives in, being found at depths between 10 and 70 m (33 and 230 ft), sometimes as deep as 130 m (430 ft).

== Biology ==
Coregonus albellus feeds on zooplankton and is slow growing. It spawns twice a year in August to October and in December to March. Spawning occurs at in deep water, the actual depth depending on the season spawning occurs.

== Human utilisation ==
Coregoinus albellus is a target species for both commercial and sport fisheries, especially in Lake Thun. It is also artificially bred with other species of whitefish for stocking and the population is endangered by hybrids produced in aquaculture. Overfishing is also considered to be a threat.
