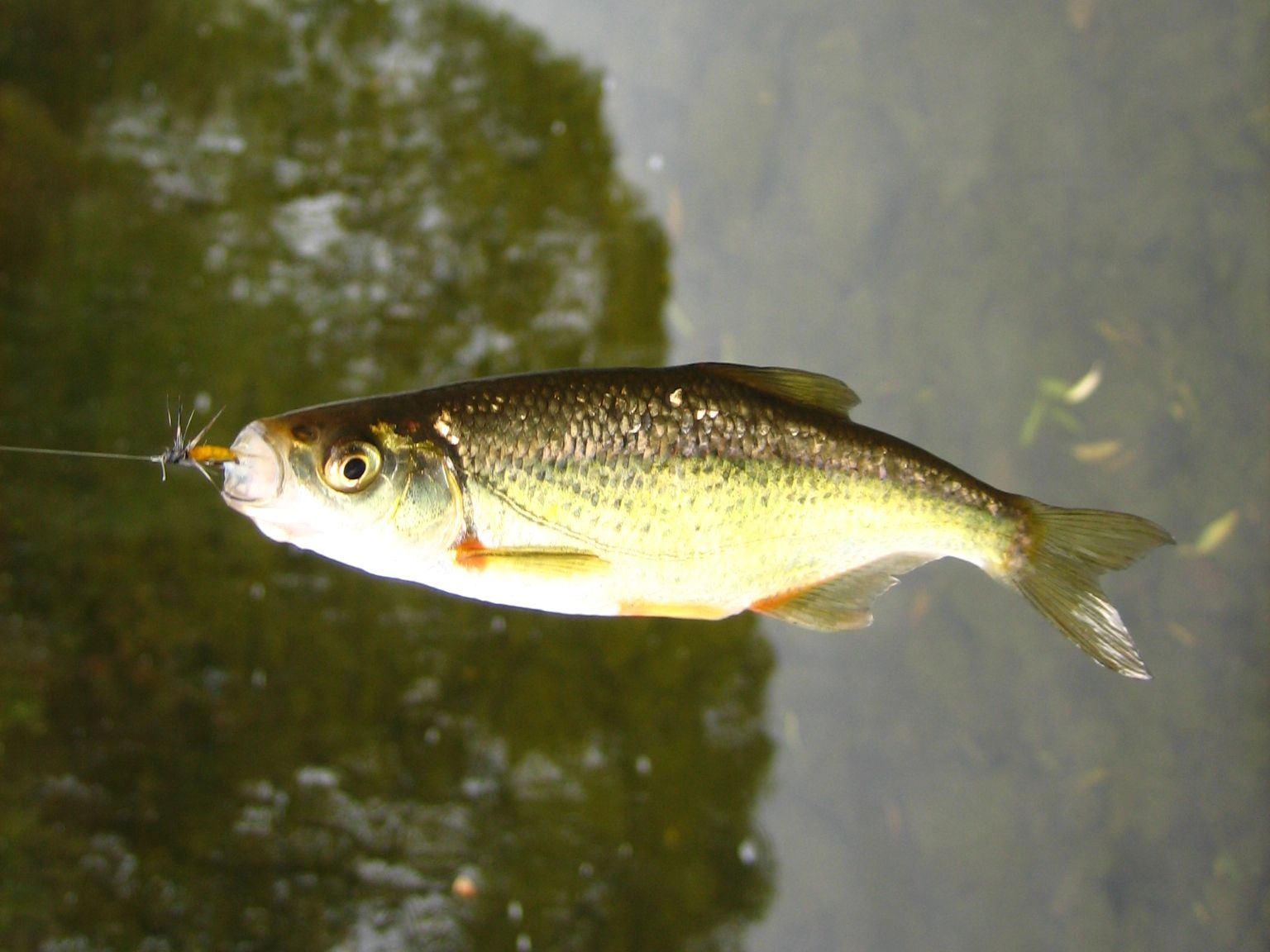
- Alburnoides bipunctatus

Scientific classification
- Kingdom: Animalia
- Phylum: Chordata
- Class: Actinopterygii
- Order: Cypriniformes
- Family: Leuciscidae
- Subfamily: Leuciscinae
- Genus: Alburnoides; Jeitteles, 1861

Type species
- Alburnus maculatus Kessler, 1859

Synonyms
- Spirlinus Fatio, 1882; Squalalburnus Berg, 1932

= Alburnoides =

Genus of fishes

Alburnoides is a genus of freshwater ray-finned fishes belonging to the family Leuciscidae. The fishes in this genus are found in Europe and Asia. Many species are known as riffle minnows or spirlins.

== Species ==
These are the currently recognised species in this genus:

- Alburnoides bipunctatus (Bloch, 1782) (Schneider)
- Alburnoides coskuncelebii Turan, Kaya, Aksu, Bayçelebi & Bektaş, 2019
- Alburnoides damghani Roudbar, Eagderi, Esmaeili, Coad & Bogutskaya, 2016 (Damghan riffle minnow)
- Alburnoides devolli Bogutskaya, Zupančič & Naseka, 2010 (Devoll riffle minnow)
- Alburnoides diclensis Turan, Bektaş, Kaya & Bayçelebi, 2016
- Alburnoides economoui Barbieri, Vukić, Šanda & Zogaris, 2017 (Spercheios spirlin)
- Alburnoides eichwaldii (De Filippi 1863) (South Caspian spirlin)
- Alburnoides emineae Turan, Kaya, Ekmekçi & Doğan, 2014 (Beyazsu chub)
- Alburnoides fangfangae Bogutskaya, Zupančič & Naseka, 2010
- Alburnoides fasciatus (Nordmann 1840) (Transcaucasian spirlin)
- Alburnoides freyhofi Turan, Kaya, Bayçelebi, Bektaş & Ekmekçi, 2017
- Alburnoides gmelini Bogutskaya & Coad, 2009
- Alburnoides holciki Coad & Bogutskaya, 2012
- Alburnoides idignensis Bogutskaya & Coad, 2009
- Alburnoides kosswigi Turan, Kaya, Bayçelebi, Bektaş & Ekmekçi, 2017
- Alburnoides kubanicus Bănărescu, 1964
- Alburnoides kurui Turan, Kaya, Bayçelebi, Bektaş & Ekmekçi, 2017
- Alburnoides maculatus (Kessler, 1859) (Crimean spirlin)
- Alburnoides manyasensis Turan, Ekmekçi, Kaya & Güçlü, 2013 (Manyas spirlin)
- Alburnoides namaki Bogutskaya & Coad, 2009
- Alburnoides nicolausi Bogutskaya & Coad, 2009
- Alburnus oblongus (Bulgakov, 1923) (Tashkent riffle bleak)
- Alburnoides ohridanus (S. Karaman, 1928) (Ohrid spirlin)
- Alburnoides petrubanarescui Bogutskaya & Coad, 2009
- Alburnoides prespensis (S. Karaman, 1924) (Prespa spirlin)
- Alburnoides qanati Bogutskaya & Coad, 2009
- Alburnoides rossicus Berg, 1924 (Russian spirlin)
- Alburnoides samiii Mousavi-Sabet, Vatandoust & Doadrio, 2015 (Samii's riffle minnow)
- Alburnoides smyrnae Pellegrin, 1927
- Alburnoides strymonicus Chichkoff, 1940
- Alburnoides tabarestanensis Mousavi-Sabet, Anvarifar & Azizi, 2015 (Tabarestan riffle minnow)
- Alburnoides thessalicus Stephanidis, 1950
- Alburnoides turani Kaya, 2020
- Alburnoides tzanevi Chichkoff, 1933
- Alburnoides varentsovi Bogutskaya & Coad, 2009
- Alburnoides velioglui Turan, Kaya, Ekmekçi & Doğan, 2014 (Velioglu's chub)
