= Velioglu's chub =

Scientific classification
- Kingdom: Animalia
- Phylum: Chordata
- Class: Actinopterygii
- Order: Cypriniformes
- Family: Leuciscidae
- Subfamily: Leuciscinae
- Genus: Alburnoides
- Species: A. velioglui

Binomial name
- Alburnoides velioglui Turan, Kaya, Ekmekçi & Doğan, 2014

Species of fish

Velioglu's chub (Alburnoides velioglui) is a species of freshwater fish in the family Cyprinidae. It is endemic to the Euphrates River drainage in Turkey.

This species reaches a length of 10.8 cm (4.3 in).

== Etymology ==
The fish is named after Hasan Basri Velioğlu, a Medical Doctor, who contributed to early and current studies on the use of radiography.
