= Victor Fatio =

Swiss zoologist

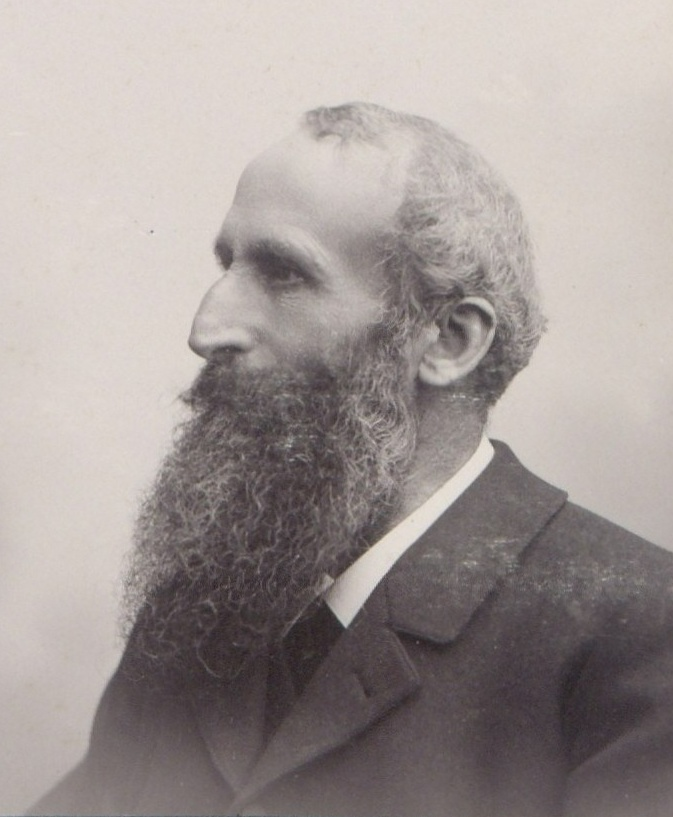
Victor Fatio

Victor Fatio (28 November 1838 – 19 March 1906), was a Swiss zoologist. He was a bird conservationist, noting the value of birds in pest control in agriculture. He was involved in organizing the first anti-phylloxera congress in Lauxanne in 1877.

== Biography ==
Fatio was born as Victor Fatio de Beaumont in Geneva to lawyer Gustave Fatio de Beaumont and Suzanne Françoise. His interest in animals was aroused in childhood, when he was accompanied his father on hunting trips. Fatio studied physiology in Zurich, Berlin and Leipzig where he studied under Ernst Heinrich and Eduard Weber to receive the degree of a Doctor of Philosophy with a thesis titled De avium corpore pneumatic (1860). In 1861 however, he almost forgot his physiology knowledge due to a typhoid fever illness. After his recovery he went to Paris in 1862 to participate in the courses of Henri Milne-Edwards (1800–1885) and Claude Bernard at the Muséum national d'histoire naturelle, where he studied zoology. He also studied zoology at Zurich under Oswald Heer and Heinrich Frey. Fatio married Anne Germaine, daughter of banker Alphone Turrettini in 1865.

When Phylloxera invaded Switzerland in 1874, Fatio made extensive studies and initiated the world's first congress for the prevention of the grapevine pest which took place in Lausanne in 1877. The results of his studies and the congress were published in his work État de la question phylloxérique en Europe en 1877 in 1878. Furthermore, he wrote several publications about Phylloxera in Switzerland and in Savoy.

Between 1869 and 1904 he worked on the Faune des Vertébrés de la Suisse was released, a comprehensive work with six volumes about the mammals, birds, amphibians, reptiles, and fish species of Switzerland.

Together with Théophile Rudolphe Studer (1845–1922), Victor Fatio published the Catalogue des oiseaux de la Suisse ("Catalog of the Swiss birds"), of which only the first three booklets were released between 1889 and 1901. Further sixteen volumes were released by other editors until 1956.

Fatio described several animal species including the Albock (Coregonus wartmanni alpinus, later reclassified as full species Coregonus fatioi by Maurice Kottelat in 1997), the Pfarrig (Coregonus confusus), the Autumn brienzlig (Coregonus albellus), or the Alpine pine vole (Microtus multiplex).

== Publications ==
Fatio's publications include:

- Instructions sommaires à l'usage des Commissions centrales d'étude et de vigilance du Phylloxera des départements de la Savoie et de la Haute-Savoie. Chambéry, Ménard, 1877. C'est un opuscule destiné à permettre de reconnaître les premières attaques du phylloxéra.
- Die Phylloxera (Reblaus). Kurzgefaßte Anweisungen zum Gebrauche für die kantonalen und eidgenössischen Experten in der Schweiz. Ins Deutsche übertragen von H. Krämer. Aarau, 2. Aufl. 1879
- Catalogue des Oiseaux de la Suisse – 1: Rapaces diurnes / par V. Fatio et D. Studer. 1889
- Catalogue des Oiseaux de la Suisse – 2: Hiboux et Fissirostres / par V. Fatio et Th. Studer. 1894
- Catalogue de Oiseaux de la Suisse – 3: Saxicolinae et Motacillidae.
- Des diverses modifications dans les formes et la coloration des plumes. (Tiré des Memoires...de Genève tome XVIII, 2ème partie). 1866
- Les campagnols du bassin du Léman. 1867
- Importance d'une assurance mutuelle contre le Phylloxera dans le canton de Genève. 1879
- Faune des Vertébrés de la Suisse – Histoire naturelle des Mammifères. Genève et Bâle. H. Georg, 1869
- Faune des Vertébrés de la Suisse – Histoire naturelle des reptiles et des batraciens. . Genève et Bâle. H. Georg, 1872
- Faune des Vertébrés de la Suisse – Histoire naturelle des Poissons. Part I.. Genève et Bâle. H. Georg, 1882
- Faune des Vertébrés de la Suisse – Histoire naturelle des Poissons. IIme partie. Physostomes (suite et fin), Anacanthiens, Chondrostéens, Cyclostomes.. Genève et Bâle. H. Georg, 1890
- Faune des Vertébrés de la Suisse – Histoire naturelle des Oiseaux Ie Partie. Genève et Bâle. H. Georg, 1899
- Faune des Vertébrés de la Suisse – Histoire naturelle des Oiseaux IIe Partie. Genève et Bâle. H. Georg, 1904
