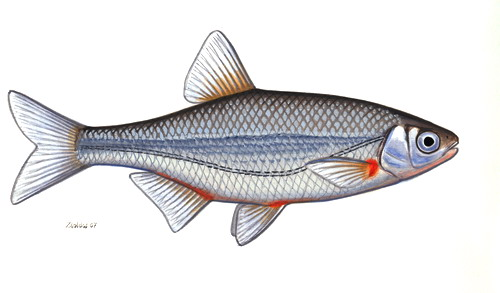

Conservation status
- Least Concern (IUCN 3.1)

Scientific classification
- Kingdom: Animalia
- Phylum: Chordata
- Class: Actinopterygii
- Division: Teleostei
- Order: Cypriniformes
- Family: Leuciscidae
- Genus: Alburnoides
- Species: A. bipunctatus

Binomial name
- Alburnoides bipunctatus (Bloch, 1782)

Synonyms
- List: Cyprinus bipunctatus Bloch, 1782; Leuciscus bipunctatus (Bloch, 1782); Alburnus bipunctatus (Bloch, 1782); Cyprinus blockii Nau, 1791; Cyprinus annoni Walbaum, 1792; Cyprinus riemling Hermann, 1804; Cyprinus spirlin Lacépède, 1803; Cyprinus punctatus Shaw 1804; Leuciscus baldneri Valenciennes, 1844

= Alburnoides bipunctatus =

Species of fish

Alburnoides bipunctatus, the schneider, spirlin, bleak, riffle minnow or bystranka, is a species of brackish and fresh water ray-finned fish belonging to the family Leuciscidae, which includes the daces, the minnows and related fishes. This is a widespread species in Europe.

== Taxonomy ==
Alburnoides bipunctatus was first formally described as Cyprinus bipunctatus in 1782 by the German naturalist and physician Marcus Elieser Bloch, with its type locality given as the Weser River near Minden in Germany. This taxon was recognised to be a species complex in the 2000s, and A. bipunctatus is now considered to be restricted to Europe. The schneider is classified in the genus Alburnoides within the subfamily Leuciscinae of the family Leuciscidae.

== Etymology ==
Alburnoides bipunctatus belongs to the genus Alburnoides. This name suffixes -oides onto the genus name Alburnus, which is Latin for "whitefish" but also refers to the bleak, a name which means "pale" in English, in reference to the pale, non-lustrous colour of Alburnus alburnus. The suffix -oides is used to indicate that this taxon is similar to Alburnus, with the type species of the Alburnoides being Alburnus maculatus. The specific name, bipunctatus, means "two spotted", a reference to the anterior half of the lateral line, where each scale is marked with a pair of black specks, each made up of tiny dots.

== Description ==
Alburnoides bipunctatus has 3 spines and 7 or 8 soft rays in its dorsal fin, with 3 spines and between 13 and 18 soft rays in its anal fin, of which between 12 and 17 1/2 are branched. The length of the snout is equal to or smaller than the diameter of the eye, which is roughly equal to the distance between the eyes. The mouth is terminal. The maximum total length is 18.5 cm (7.3 in), although 9 cm (3.5 in) is more typical, and the maximum weight is 30 g (1.1 oz).

== Distribution and habitat ==
Alburnoides bipunctatus was thought to be widely distributed in Europe and western Asia, but following taxonomc revisions in the 2000s, A. bipunctatus sensu stricto is considered to be restricted to Europe. It occurs in Central and Western Europe in rivers draining into the Bay of Biscay, North Sea and Baltic Sea, fronm the Charente in France to the Vistula in Poland. In the Mediterranean basin it occurs only in southern France, from the Aude to the Argens, including the Rhône. The population in the Danube needs to be confirmed to be A. bipunctatus, as three distinct genetic lineages have been found in the upper, middle and lower sections of the Danube river system. It is also found along the rivers Prut, Siret and their affluents. This species is found in the lower lying stretches of streams and smaller rivers, where it prefers clear, flowing, well-oxygenated water with substrates made up of sand, gravel, pebbles or stones.

== Biology ==
Alburnoides bipunctatus spawns between May and July in clear running water over gravel or pebble streambeds. They spawn in small groups, and each female may spawn several times in a season.

Their diet is made up of insect larvae and dead insects, with some crustaceans and diatoms.
