= Alburnoides maculatus =

Conservation status
- Endangered (IUCN 3.1)

Scientific classification
- Kingdom: Animalia
- Phylum: Chordata
- Class: Actinopterygii
- Order: Cypriniformes
- Family: Leuciscidae
- Subfamily: Leuciscinae
- Genus: Alburnoides
- Species: A. maculatus

Binomial name
- Alburnoides maculatus (Kessler, 1859)

Synonyms
- Alburnus maculatus Kessler, 1859

Species of fish

Alburnoides maculatus, the Crimean spirlin or Crimean riffle minnow, is a species of small (7.3 cm max length) freshwater fish in the family Leuciscidae. It is endemic to the Crimea Peninsula.

== Taxonomy ==
Alburnoides maculatus was first formally described as Alburnus maculatus in 1859 by the Baltic German zoologist Karl Fedorovich Kessler with its type locality given as the Salghir River at Simferopol in Crimea, Ukraine. This taxon has been regarded as a synonym of the schneider (A. bipunctatus) but is now accepted as a separate valid species. In 1861 Ludwig Heinrich Jeitteles placed Alburnus maculatus in the monospecific genus Alburnoides, meaning this taxon is the type species of that genus by monotypy. The genus Alburnoides is classified in the subfamily Leuciscinae of the family Leuciscidae.

== Etymology ==
Alburnoides maculatus belongs to the genus Alburnoides, this name suffixes -oides on to the genus name Alburnus, which is Latin for whitefish but also refers to the bleak, a name which means pale in English, in reference to the pale non lustrous colour of Alburnus alburnus. The suffix -oides is used to indicate that this taxon is similar to Alburnus, with the type species of the Alburnoides being Alburnus maculatus. The specific name, maculatus, means "spotted", a reference to the black spots on the scales on the flanks which also mark the lateral line.

== Identification ==
Alburnoides maculatus is similar to the schneider A. bipunctatus but a morphological analysis showed that features such as the pharyngeal teeth, meristics and other morphological characters in combination clustered together and separately from the related species in southeastern Europe and Western Asia, confirming its validity as a species.

== Distribution and habitat ==
Alburnoides maculatus is endemic to the southern Crimean Peninsula, where it is found in the Chornaya, Belbek, Kacha and Al'ma river systems. The population in the Salgir river, the type locality, may be the result of an artificial introduction. The Crimean spirlin lives in shallow stretches of rivers where there is a fast current and a substrate of gravel, pebbles or rocks.
