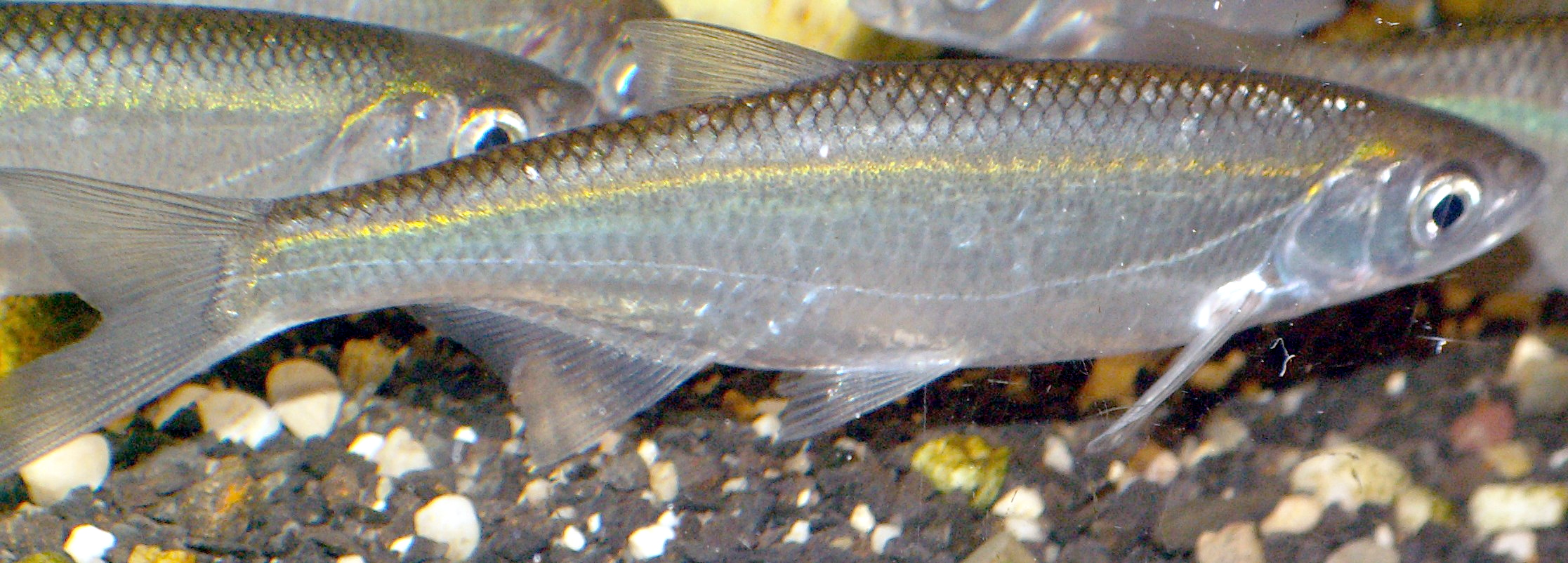

Conservation status
- Least Concern (IUCN 3.1)

Scientific classification
- Kingdom: Animalia
- Phylum: Chordata
- Class: Actinopterygii
- Division: Teleostei
- Order: Cypriniformes
- Family: Leuciscidae
- Subfamily: Leuciscinae
- Genus: Alburnus
- Species: A. alburnus

Binomial name
- Alburnus alburnus (Linnaeus, 1758)

Synonyms
- Cyprinus alburnus Linnaeus, 1758; Leuciscus alburnus (Linnaeus 1758); Aspius ochrodon Fitzinger, 1832; Aspius alburnoides Selys-longchamps, 1842; Alburnus lucidus Heckel, 1843; Alburnus strigio Bonaparte, 1845; Alburnus avola Bonaparte, 1846; Alburnus breviceps Heckel & Kner, 1857; Alburnus fracchia Heckel & Kner, 1857; Alburnus lucidus var. lacustris Heckel & Kner, 1857; Alburnus scoranzoides Heckel & Kner, 1857; Alburnus lucidus var. angustior Walecki, 1863; Alburnus lucidus var. latior Walecki, 1863; Alburnus alborella var. lateristriga Canestrini, 1864; Alburnus fabraei Blanchard, 1866; Alburnus mirandella Blanchard, 1866; Alburnus lucidus var. colobocephala Fatio, 1882; Alburnus lucidus var. elata Fatio, 1882; Alburnus lucidus var. elongata Fatio, 1882; Alburnus lucidus var. oxycephala Fatio, 1882; Leuciscus lucidus var. ilmenensis Warpachowski, 1886; Alburnus striatus Petrov, 1926; Alburnus alburnus strumicae Karaman, 1955

= Common bleak =

Species of fish

The bleak or common bleak (Alburnus alburnus) is a small freshwater coarse fish of the family Leuciscidae, which includes the minnows, daces and bleaks. The common bleak is found in Europe and Western Asia.

== Description ==
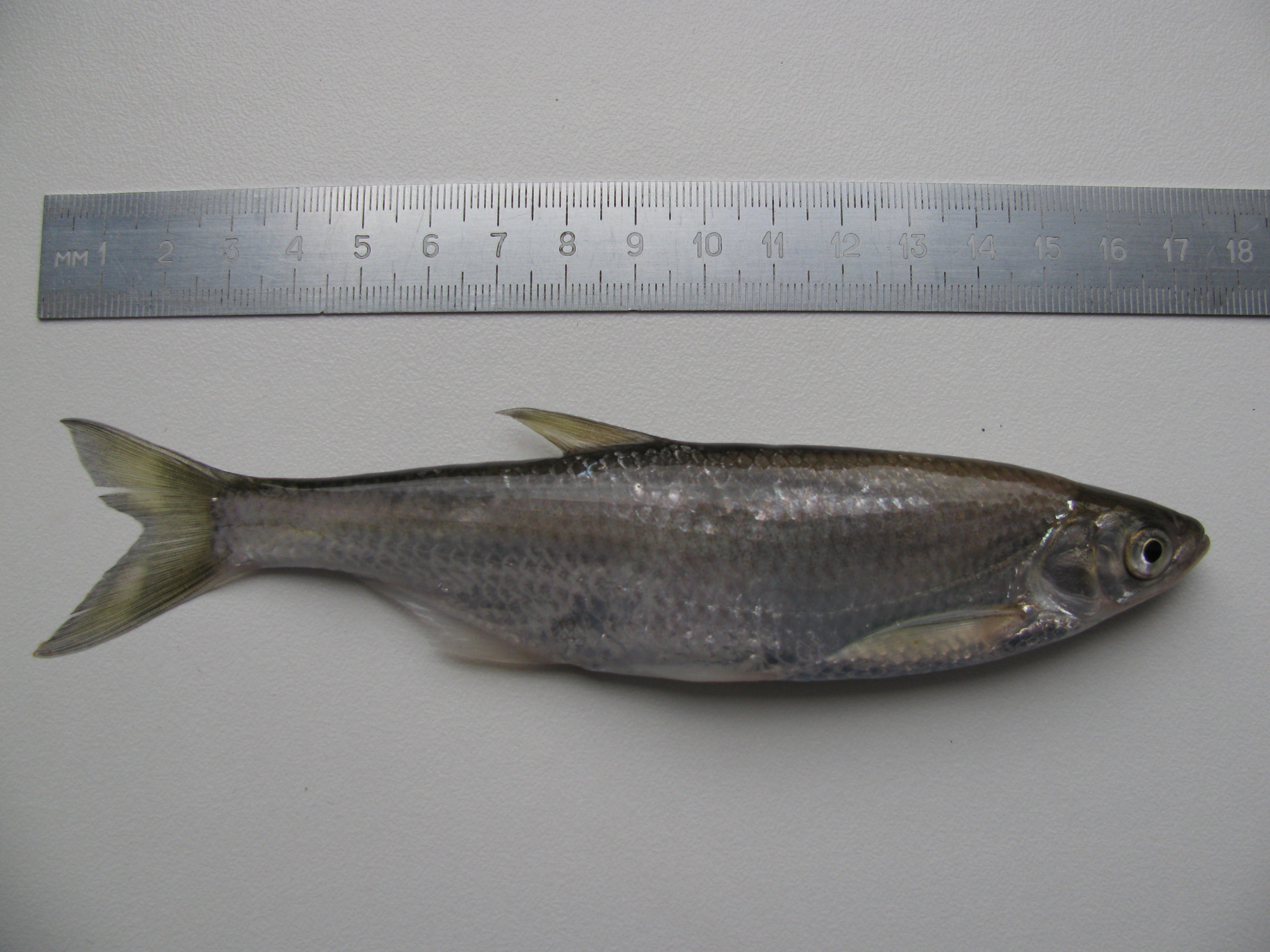

The body of the bleak is elongated and flat. The head is pointed and the relatively small mouth is turned upwards. The anal fin is long and has 18–23 fin rays. The lateral line is complete. The bleak has a shiny silvery colour, and the fins are pointed and colourless. Its maximum length is about 25 cm (10 in).

In Europe, the bleak can easily be confused with many other species. In England, young common bream and silver bream can be confused with young bleak, though the pointed, upward-turned mouth of the bleak is already distinctive at young stages. Young roach and ruffe have wider bodies and short anal fins.

== Occurrence ==
The bleak occurs in Europe and Western Asia: north of the Caucasus, Pyrenees, and Alps, and eastward toward the Volga basin in northern Iran and north-western Turkey. It is absent from Iberian and Apennine peninsulas, from the rivers of Adriatic watershed on the Balkans and most of British Isles except southeast England. It is locally introduced in Spain, Portugal, and Italy, though.

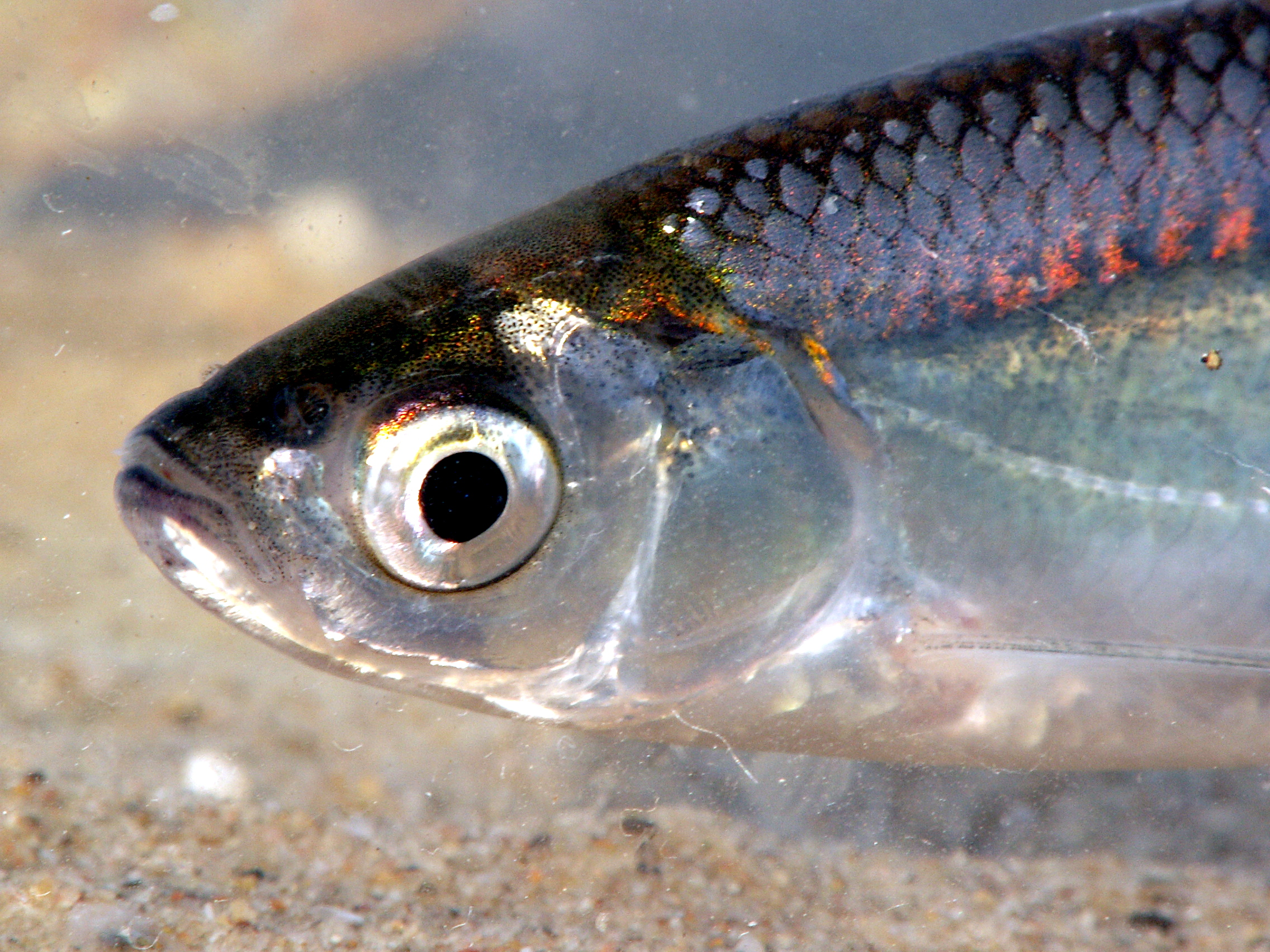
The shiny and pearly colours on the head of a bleak in direct sunlight

== Ecology ==
The bleak lives in great schools and feeds upon small molluscs, insects that fall in the water, insect larvae, worms, small shellfish, and plant detritus. It is found in streams and lakes. The bleak prefers open waters and is found in large numbers where an inflow of food from pumping stations or behind weirs occurs.

=== Spawning ===
The bleak spawns near the shore in shallow waters. Some are found in deep water. The substrate is not important.

=== Reproduction ===
The Common Bleak typically reaches sexual maturity at around three years of age. Its spawning period takes place from April to June when the water temperature ranges between 14 and 15 °C (approximately 58 °F).

During this time, a female Common Bleak can lay between 5,000 and 7,000 eggs in multiple batches. These eggs are deposited on submerged vegetation or shallow areas of the water. Males undergo changes during the spawning season, developing nuptial tubercles on their backs and flanks, while their fins take on an orange hue. The incubation period for the eggs lasts about 2 to 3 weeks.

The growth rate of the young fish, known as fry, is relatively slow, and their primary source of nutrition is plankton. It is also possible for hybridization to occur between the Common Bleak and other cyprinid fish species, such as Chub, Roach, Rudd, or Bream.

=== Importance ===
The bleak is an important food source for predatory fish. It is more sensitive to pollution than other cyprinids, which might explain the decline in north-western Europe.

== Uses ==
Bleak are used as bait for sport-fishing for larger fish. In 1656 in Paris, a Mr. Jaquin extracted from the scales of the common bleak, so-called essence Orientale or "pearl essence", (used in making artificial pearls), which is crystalline guanine.
