= Whitefish (fisheries term) =

Several species of demersal fish with fins

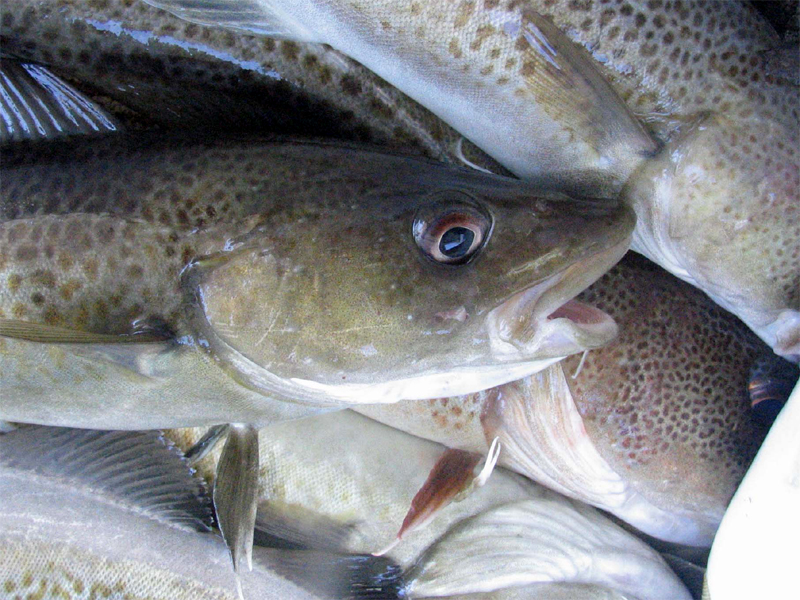
White fish (Atlantic cod)

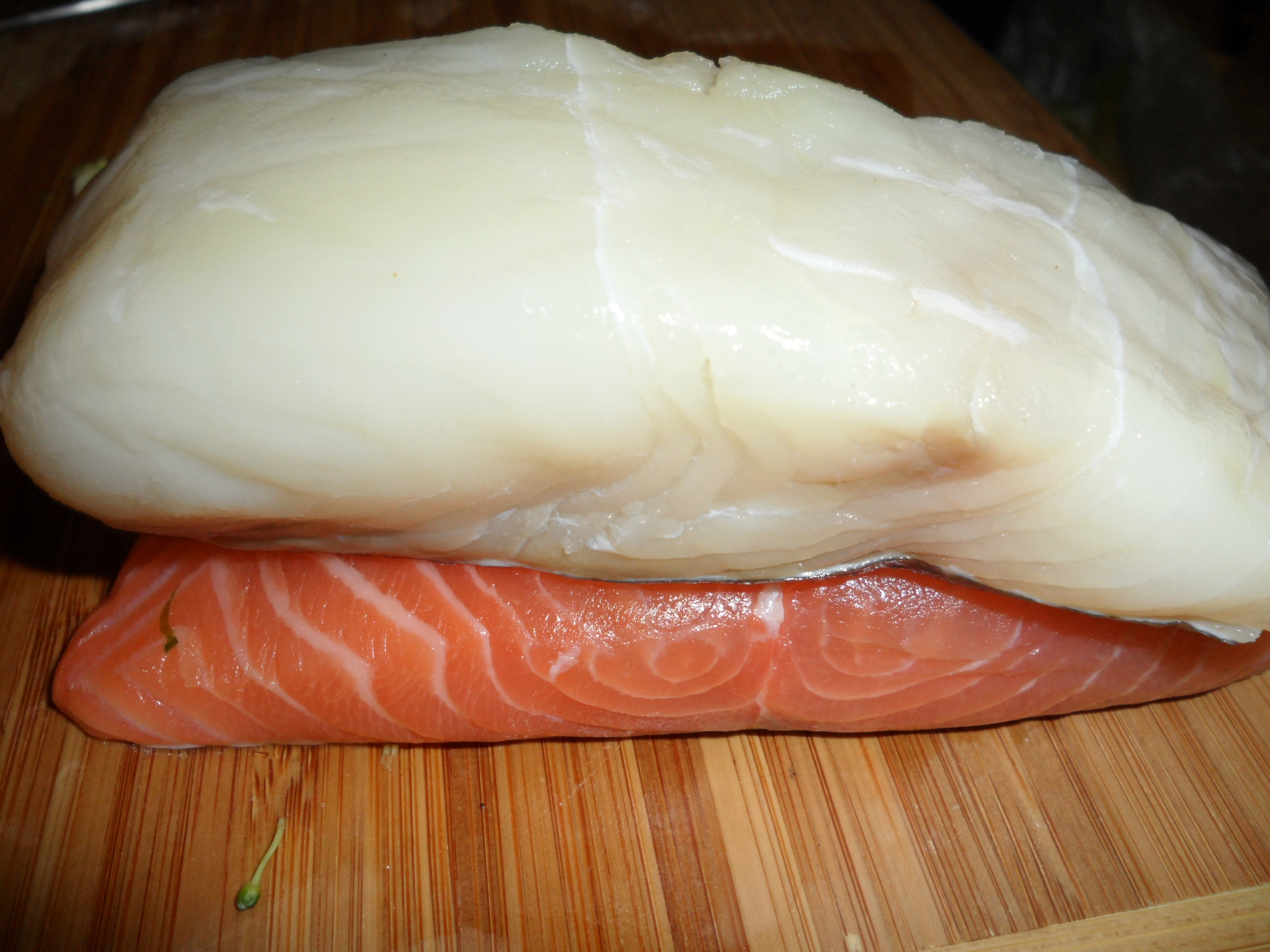
White fish fillet (halibut – on top) contrasted with an oily fish fillet (salmon – at bottom)

Whitefish or white fish is a fisheries term for several species of demersal fish with fins, particularly Atlantic cod (Gadus morhua), whiting (Merluccius bilinearis), haddock (Melanogrammus aeglefinus), hake (Urophycis), and pollock (Pollachius), among others.

Whitefish live on or near the seafloor, and can be contrasted with the oily or blue fish (also known as fatty fish), including pelagic fish, which live away from the seafloor. Whitefish do not have much oil in their tissue, and have flakier white or light-coloured flesh. Most of the oil found in their bodies is concentrated in the organs, e.g. cod liver oil.

Whitefish can be divided into benthopelagic fish (round fish that live near the sea bed, such as cod and coley) and benthic fish (which live on the sea bed, such as flatfish like plaice).

Whitefish is sometimes eaten straight but is often used reconstituted for fishsticks, gefilte fish, lutefisk, surimi (imitation crab meat), etc. Because of their lower oil and fat content, whitefish are particularly suitable for preservation by salting and drying. For centuries it was preserved by drying as stockfish and clipfish and traded as a world commodity. It is commonly used as the fish in the classic British dish of fish and chips.

== Growth ==
The growth amidst whitefish species can be altered due to intraspecific competition. Fish populations such as Vendace and Roach share zooplankton for food which is crucial for young populations of whitefish. As this competition occurs, growth rate can be affected within multiple age groups or at an older age.

== Nutritional information ==
One fillet of whitefish, mixed species (198g) contains the following nutritional information according to the United States Department of Agriculture:

Name	Amount	Unit
Water	144	g
Energy	265	kcal
Energy	1110	kJ
Protein	37.8	g
Total lipid (fat)	11.6	g
Ash	2.22	g
Carbohydrate, by difference	0	g
Fiber, total dietary	0	g
Sugars, total including NLEA	0	g
Calcium, Ca	51.5	mg
Iron, Fe	0.733	mg
Magnesium, Mg	65.3	mg
Phosphorus, P	535	mg
Potassium, K	628	mg
Sodium, Na	101	mg
Zinc, Zn	1.96	mg
Copper, Cu	0.143	mg
Manganese, Mn	0.133	mg
Selenium, Se	24.9	μg
Vitamin C, total ascorbic acid	0	mg
Thiamin	0.277	mg
Riboflavin	0.238	mg
Niacin	5.94	mg
Pantothenic acid	1.48	mg
Vitamin B-6	0.594	mg
Folate, total	29.7	μg
Folic acid	0	μg
Folate, food	29.7	μg
Folate, DFE	29.7	μg
Choline, total	129	mg
Vitamin B-12	1.98	μg
Vitamin B-12, added	0	μg
Vitamin A, RAE	71.3	μg
Retinol	71.3	μg
Carotene, beta	0	μg
Carotene, alpha	0	μg
Cryptoxanthin, beta	0	μg
Vitamin A, IU	238	IU
Lycopene	0	μg
Lutein + zeaxanthin	0	μg
Vitamin E (alpha-tocopherol)	0.396	mg
Vitamin E, added	0	mg
Vitamin D (D2 + D3), International Units	946	IU
Vitamin D (D2 + D3)	23.8	μg
Vitamin D3 (cholecalciferol)	23.8	μg
Vitamin K (phylloquinone)	0.198	μg
Fatty acids, total saturated	1.79	g
SFA 4:0	0	g
SFA 6:0	0	g
SFA 8:0	0	g
SFA 10:0	0	g
SFA 12:0	0	g
SFA 14:0	0.216	g
SFA 16:0	1.19	g
SFA 18:0	0.392	g
Fatty acids, total monounsaturated	3.96	g
MUFA 16:1	1.03	g
MUFA 18:1	2.67	g
MUFA 20:1	0.206	g
MUFA 22:1	0.05	g
Fatty acids, total polyunsaturated	4.26	g
PUFA 18:2	0.539	g
PUFA 18:3	0.362	g
PUFA 18:4	0.099	g
PUFA 20:4	0.442	g
PUFA 20:5 n-3 (EPA)	0.628	g
PUFA 22:5 n-3 (DPA)	0.323	g
PUFA 22:6 n-3 (DHA)	1.86	g
Cholesterol	119	mg
Tryptophan	0.424	g
Threonine	1.66	g
Isoleucine	1.74	g
Leucine	3.07	g
Lysine	3.46	g
Methionine	1.12	g
Cystine	0.406	g
Phenylalanine	1.48	g
Tyrosine	1.28	g
Valine	1.95	g
Arginine	2.26	g
Histidine	1.11	g
Alanine	2.28	g
Aspartic acid	3.88	g
Glutamic acid	5.64	g
Glycine	1.81	g
Proline	1.34	g
Serine	1.54	g
Alcohol, ethyl	0	g
Caffeine	0	mg
Theobromine	0	mg

== See also ==
- Bottom feeder
- Whitefish salad
